= Method Studios =

Visual effects studio

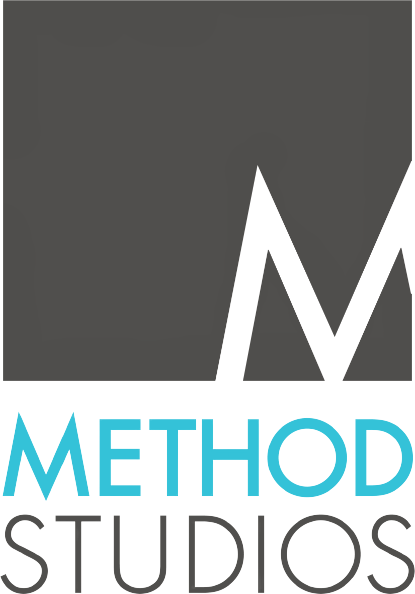
- Founded: 1998
- Headquarters: Los Angeles, California
- Number of locations: New York City, USA; San Francisco, USA; Atlanta, USA; Vancouver, Canada; Montreal, Canada; Melbourne, Australia; Pune, India
- Key people: Ed Ulbrich – President and General Manager, Visual Effects and VR; Eric Combrie – COO; Erika Burton – EVP, Global Features VFX
- Services: Visual Effects
- Parent: Framestore
- Website: www.methodstudios.com

Method Studios is a visual effects company launched in 1999 in Los Angeles, California with facilities in New York, Atlanta, Vancouver, San Francisco, Melbourne, Montreal, and Pune. The company provides production and post-production services including conceptual design, look development, on-set supervision, 3D animation/CGI, matte painting, AR/VR, compositing and finishing.

Some commercial and feature projects produced by Method Studios have been recognized by award bodies such as the Visual Effects Society (VES) and Association of Independent Commercial Producers (AICP). Some Method staff have been invited to speak at industry conferences such as SIGGRAPH, NAB, Collider and the VES Production Summit.

== Affiliations ==
In late 2010, Method Studios was acquired by Deluxe to form part of the Deluxe Entertainment Services Group Inc. This group includes other companies specializing in post-production such as Company 3 (color grading), Encore (TV post-production and visual effects), and Beast (editorial). Method Studios co-locate with both Company 3 and Beast in Atlanta, share facility space with Company 3 in Los Angeles and New York, and share facility space with Encore in Vancouver. In 2018 Deluxe Entertainment Services Group Inc. acquired the award-winning VFX studio Atomic Fiction, and joined it with Method Studios.

In November 2020, after Deluxe filed for bankruptcy a year prior, it was announced that Method Studios, along with Company 3 and several of Deluxe's other creative businesses, would be acquired by Framestore.

In May 2025, Company 3 announced the full integration of Method Finishing into its short-form operations in New York, Atlanta, and Los Angeles.

== Clients ==
Method Studios has collaborated on feature films with many top studios such as Warner Bros., Twentieth Century Fox, Walt Disney Studios, Marvel Studios and Paramount. In terms of commercial production, the company maintains working relationships with many award-winning directors such as Noam Murro, Tom Kuntz, Jake Scott, Nicolai Fuglsig and Mark Romanek. Commercial clients include Verizon, DirecTV, Kia Motors, Microsoft, Bridgestone, Chrysler and Canon through agencies David&Goliath, Grey, Goodby, Silverstein & Partners, Twofifteen and TBWA/Chiat Day and many more.

== Filmography ==
=== 2000s ===
Year	Films	Director(s)	Studio(s) and Distributor(s)	Budget	Gross
2008	Changeling	Clint Eastwood	Universal Studios	$55 million	$113.4 million
2009	Watchmen	Zack Snyder	Warner Bros. Pictures; Paramount Pictures	$130–138 million	$185.3 million
2009	Angels & Demons	Ron Howard	Sony Pictures	$150 million	$485.9 million
2009	Invictus	Clint Eastwood	Spyglass Entertainment; Warner Bros. Pictures	$50–60 million	$122.2 million

=== 2010s ===
Year	Film	Director(s)	Studio(s) and Distributor(s)	Budget	Gross
2010	I'm Here	Spike Jonze	Absolut Vodka	N/A	N/A
2010	A Nightmare on Elm Street	Samuel Bayer	Platinum Dunes; Warner Bros.	$35 million	$117.7 million
2010	The Sorcerer's Apprentice	Jon Turteltaub	Jerry Bruckheimer Films; Walt Disney Pictures	$150 million	$215.3 million
2010	Salt	Philip Noyce	Di Bonaventura Pictures; Sony Pictures	$110–130 million	$295.3 million
2010	Let Me In	Matt Reeves	Relativity Media; Paramount Pictures	$20 million	$24.1 million
2010	Red	Robert Schwentke	Di Bonaventura Pictures; Summit Entertainment	$60 million	$199 million
2011	The Green Hornet	Michael Gondry	Original Film; Sony Pictures	$120 million	$229.2 million
2011	Pirates of the Caribbean: On Stranger Tides	Rob Marshall	Jerry Bruckheimer Films; Walt Disney Pictures	$410.6 million	$1.046 billion
2011	The Tree of Life	Terrence Malick	River Road Entertainment; Fox Searchlight Pictures	$32 million	$61.7 million
2011	X-Men: First Class	Matthew Vaughn	Marvel Entertainment; 20th Century Fox	$140–160 million	$353.6 million
2011	Captain America: The First Avenger	Joe Johnston	Marvel Studios; Paramount Pictures	$140 million	$370.6 million
2011	The Ides of March	George Clooney	Sony Pictures	$12.5 million	$76.3 million
2011	Contagion	Steven Soderbergh	Warner Bros.	$60 million	$136.5 million
2011	Tower Heist	Brett Ratner	Universal Pictures	$75–85 million	$152.9 million
2011	The Twilight Saga: Breaking Dawn Part 1	Bill Condon	Summit Entertainment	$127 million	$712.2 million
2011	J. Edgar	Clint Eastwood	Warner Bros.	$35 million	$84.9 million
2011	Jack and Jill	Dennis Dugan	Happy Madison Productions; Sony Pictures	$79 million	$149 million
2011	New Years Eve	Garry Marshall	Warner Bros.	$56 million	$142 million
2011	Ghost Rider: Spirit of Vengeance	Mark Neveldine; Brian Taylor	Marvel Entertainment; Sony Pictures	$57–75 million	$132.6 million
2011	The Girl with the Dragon Tattoo	David Fincher	Sony Pictures	$90 million	$239.3 million
2011	Extremely Loud & Incredibly Close	Stephen Daldry	Warner Bros.	$40 million	$55.2 million
2012	Man on a Ledge	Asger Leth	Summit Entertainment	$42 million	$47.6 million
2012	This Means War	McG	20th Century Fox	$65 million	$156.5 million
2012	The Pirates! In an Adventure with Scientists!	Peter Lord	Aardman AnimationColumbia Pictures Sony Pictures Animation	$55 million	$123 million
2012	Wrath of the Titans	Jonathan Liebesman	Warner Bros.	$150 million	$302 million
2012	Dark Shadows	Tim Burton	Warner Bros. Roadshow Entertainment	$150 million	$245.5 million
2012	Men in Black 3	Barry Sonnenfeld	Columbia Pictures Sony Pictures	$215–225 million	$654.2 million
2012	Abraham Lincoln: Vampire Hunter	Timur Bekmambetov		$million	$million
2012	Ted	Seth MacFarlane		$million	$million
2012	Looper			$million	$million
2012	Argo (Iloura)			$million	$million
2012	Cloud Atlas			$million	$million
2012	Flight	Robert Zemeckis		$million	$million
2013	Beautiful Creatures			$million	$million
2013	A Good Day to Die Hard			$million	$million
2013	Iron Man 3			$million	$million
2013	After Earth (Iloura)			$million	$million
2013	White House Down			$million	$million
2013	The Wolverine (Iloura)			$million	$million
2013	Riddick			$million	$million
2013	Thor: The Dark World			$million	$million
2013	The Hunger Games: Catching Fire			$million	$million
2013	The Wolf of Wall Street	Martin Scorsese		$million	$million
2014	The Monuments Men			$million	$million
2014	Robocop			$million	$million
2014	Divergent			$million	$million
2014	A Million Ways to Die in the West (Iloura)	Seth MacFarlane		$million	$million
2014	Transformers: Age of Extinction			$million	$million
2014	Guardians of the Galaxy	James Gunn	Marvel Studios	$million	$million
2014	Hercules			$million	$million
2014	Into the Storm			$million	$million
2014	The Maze Runner			$million	$million
2014	Night at the Museum: Secret of the Tomb	Shawn Levy		$million	$million
2015	Jupiter Ascending			$million	$million
2015	The SpongeBob Movie: Sponge Out of Water	Paul Tibbitt; Mike Mitchell		$million	$million
2015	Mad Max: Fury Road			$million	$million
2015	San Andreas			$million	$million
2015	Ted 2	Seth MacFarlane		$million	$million
2015	Ant-Man	Peyton Reed	Marvel Studios	$million	$million
2015	The Walk	Robert Zemeckis		$million	$million
2016	Deadpool	Tim Miller		$million	$million
2016	Captain America: Civil War		Marvel Studios	$million	$million
2016	Star Trek Beyond			$million	$million
2016	Ghostbusters	Paul Feig		$million	$million
2016	Voyage of Time			$million	$million
2016	Deepwater Horizon			$million	$million
2016	Doctor Strange		Marvel Studios	$million	$million
2016	Allied	Robert Zemeckis		$million	$million
2016	Fantastic Beasts and Where to Find Them			$million	$million
2017	Ghost in the Shell			$million	$million
2017	Guardians of the Galaxy Vol. 2	James Gunn	Marvel Studios	$million	$million
2017	King Arthur: Legend of the Sword			$million	$million
2017	Pirates of the Caribbean: Dead Men Tell No Tales			$million	$million
2017	Okja			$million	$million
2017	Transformers: The Last Knight			$million	$million
2017	Spider-Man: Homecoming (Iloura)	Jon Watts		$million	$million
2017	Blade Runner 2049			$million	$million
2017	Thor: Ragnarok (Iloura)	Taika Waititi		$million	$million
2017	Jumanji: Welcome to the Jungle (Iloura)	Jake Kasdan		$million	$million
2017	Bright (Iloura)			$million	$million
2018	Black Panther			$million	$million
2018	A Wrinkle in Time			$million	$million
2018	Pacific Rim: Uprising			$million	$million
2018	Tomb Raider (Iloura)			$million	$million
2018	Avengers: Infinity War	Anthony and Joe Russo		$million	$million
2018	Deadpool 2			$million	$million
2018	Ant-Man and the Wasp			$million	$million
2018	Skyscraper (Iloura)			$million	$million
2018	Christopher Robin (Iloura)			$million	$million
2018	Crazy Rich Asians (Iloura)			$million	$million
2018	A.X.L. (Iloura)			$million	$million
2018	The Predator			$million	$million
2018	Outlaw King			$million	$million
2018	Fantastic Beasts: The Crimes of Grindelwald			$million	$million
2018	The Christmas Chronicles	Clay Kaytis		$million	$million
2018	Aquaman			$million	$million
2018	Welcome to Marwen	Robert Zemeckis		$million	$million
2019	Velvet Buzzsaw		Netflix	$million	$million
2019	Triple Frontier			$million	$million
2019	John Wick: Chapter 3 - Parabellum			$million	$million
2019	Godzilla: King of the Monsters			$million	$million
2019	Rim of the World			$million	$million
2019	Men in Black: International			$million	$million
2019	Spider-Man: Far From Home	Jon Watts		$million	$million
2019	Ad Astra			$million	$million
2019	Ford v Ferrari			$million	$million
2019	The Laundromat			$million	$million
2019	It Chapter Two	Andy Muschietti		$million	$million
2019	Terminator: Dark Fate			$million	$million
2019	Doctor Sleep			$million	$million
2019	Jumanji: The Next Level	Jake Kasdan		$million	$million

=== 2020s ===
Year	Film	Director(s)	Studio(s) and Distributor(s)	Budget	Gross
2020	Birds of Prey			$million	$million
2020	Downhill			$million	$million
2020	Bloodshot			$million	$million
2020	The New Mutants			$million	$million
2020	Extraction			$million	$million
2020	The One and Only Ivan			$million	$million
2020	The Witches			$million	$million
2020	The Babysitter: Killer Queen			$million	$million
2020	Wonder Woman 1984			$million	$million
2020	A Babysitter's Guide to Monster Hunting			$million	$million
2021	Mortal Kombat			$million	$million
2021	The Conjuring: The Devil Made Me Do It			$million	$million
2021	The Tomorrow War			$million	$million
2021	Shang-Chi and the Legend of the Ten Rings	Destin Daniel Cretton	Marvel Studios	$150–200 million	$432.2 million
2021	Eternals		Marvel Studios	$million	$million
2021	Thunder Force			$million	$million
2021	Candyman			$million	$million
2022	RRR			$million	$million
2022	K.G.F: Chapter 2			$million	$million
2022	Top Gun: Maverick			$million	$million
2022	Thor: Love and Thunder	Taika Waititi	Marvel Studios	$250 million	$760.9 million
2022	Elvis			$million	$million
2023	Creation of the Gods I: Kingdom of Storms				

=== Commercials ===
Commercial visual effects work produced by Method Studios includes Justin Timberlake's Filthy, Microsoft Surface: Combo, The Battle of Evony, Ford: Be the Guardian of Your Galaxy, and Nature Valley: Swimmer. They also did commercials for Fox NFL Sunday featuring Cleatus.

== Method Design ==
Method Design is a design arm of Method Studios located within their Los Angeles and New York offices. This group has completed main titles and design for feature films and episodic shows including Godless, American Horror Story, The Night Of, and El Chapo. In addition to the film and trailer markets, Method Design has also done extensive commercial design work with Method Studios' commercial visual effects and finishing teams around the world.

== Awards won ==
Visual Effects Society Awards

- 2013, Outstanding Compositing in a Commercial - Chevy '2012 Silverado'
- 2011, Outstanding Visual Effects in a Live Action Commercial - Halo Reach 'Deliver Hope'

AICP Awards

- 2014, VFX - GE 'Childlike Imagination'
- 2013, Animation - DirecTV 'Troll'
- 2011, VFX - Halo Reach 'Deliver Hope'

Clio Awards

- 2014, Silver winner for VFX - DirecTV 'Troll'
- 2012, Gold winner for VFX - Jameson 'Fire'
- 2007, Gold winner for VFX – Adidas ‘Carry’
- 2005, Silver winner for VFX – Sears ‘Arboretum’

London International Awards

- 2013, Bronze for Music Video VFX - Deadmau5 'Professional Greifers'
- 2013, Bronze for Commercial Animation - DirecTV 'Troll'
- 2012, Silver for VFX - Kia 'Share Some Soul'
- 2011, Gold for VFX - Halo Reach 'Deliver Hope'

Australian Effects and Animation Festival (AEAF Awards)

- 2013, Commercial Animation - DirecTV 'Troll'
- 2013, Idents & Stings - SBS 'Fresh History'
- 2013, Music Videos - Deadmau5 'Professional Greifers'
- 2012, Commercial Animation - Kia 'Share Some Soul'

Hollywood Post Alliance Awards

- 2014, VFX - GE 'Childlike Imagination
- 2012, Compositing - Chevy '2012 Silverado'
- 2011, Compositing - Jameson 'Fire'

CICLOPE Awards

- 2014, Gold for Live Action VFX - GE 'Childlike Imagination
- 2013, Bronze for Live Action VFX - DirecTV 'Troll'
- 2012, Silver for Live Action VFX - Halo 4 'The Commissioning'

3D World

- 2011, Best use of CG in Advertising - Halo Reach 'Deliver Hope'
