= Gamer (soundtrack) =

Gamer (Original Motion Picture Soundtrack)

Film score by Geoff Zanelli and Robert Williamson
- Released: September 1, 2009
- Recorded: 2009
- Genre: Film score
- Length: 58:26
- Label: Lakeshore
- Producers: Geoff Zanelli; Robert Williamson

Geoff Zanelli chronology
Outlander (2009)	Gamer (2009)	The Pacific (2010)

Robert Williamson chronology
Dandelion (2004)	Gamer (2009)

Gamer (Original Motion Picture Soundtrack) is the film score composed by Geoff Zanelli and Robert Williamson to the 2009 film Gamer directed by the duo of Mark Neveldine and Brian Taylor, starring Gerard Butler, Logan Lerman, Michael C. Hall, Ludacris, Amber Valletta, Terry Crews, Alison Lohman, John Leguizamo, Sam Witwer and Zoë Bell. The film score was released through September 1, 2009, via Lakeshore Records.

== Background ==
Geoff Zanelli composed the film score jointly with Robert Williamson. Initially, the latter was associated in the sole composer, but he wanted Zanelli to be involved in the project. Zanelli also being interested on experiment in the film sonically, resulting in a unique dark and electronic score. The film also features a cover of "Sweet Dreams (Are Made of This)" by Marilyn Manson, "The Bad Touch" by the Bloodhound Gang, and a medley of "I've Got You Under My Skin", "Big Bad John" and "Night And Day" by Sammy Davis Jr.

== Reception ==
Christopher Coleman of Tracksounds wrote "The score for Gamer certainly connects the audience to the technological and even diabolical sides of the film, but leaves out any traces of humanity [...] If there is such a thing as "musical masochism" Gamer might just be it." Jonathan Broxton of Movie Music UK wrote "Gamer has no soul. It's just there, sitting on top of everything, incessantly blaring away, creating an artificial sense of excitement, whipping up a storm with no indication that there is a film underneath it all which might actually benefit from music that amounts to more than industrial groans, bad rock music and bad video game sound effects."

William Ruhlmann of AllMusic wrote "This is not subtle material, but it is stirring, and Gamer is a movie that requires such bombast." Bill Gibron of PopMatters wrote "This may just be the post-post modern trend for film soundtracks, and if it is, it's fantastic." Brent Simon of Screen International noted that the technicalities, including Zanelli and Williamson's score "are all heavily treated, to match Neveldine and Taylor's caffeinated aesthetic. And this doesn't leave much room for memorable performances". Jeannette Catsoulis of The New York Times and Rob Nelson of Variety found it "offbeat" and "pulsating".

== Track listing ==
No.	Title	Artist(s)	Length
1.	"Sweet Dreams (Are Made Of This)"	Marilyn Manson	4:53
2.	"The Bad Touch"	Bloodhound Gang	4:20
3.	"Deathmatch"		3:14
4.	"Society"		0:42
5.	"Slayers"		0:39
6.	"Kable's New Ride"		2:19
7.	"The Prison Yard"		1:39
8.	"Upgrade"		3:14
9.	"Target Practice"		4:22
10.	"Gina Parker Smith"		0:27
11.	"Simon's House"		2:56
12.	"Turn Me Loose"		1:50
13.	"You Have to Escape"		2:17
14.	"Kable Is Gone"		0:56
15.	"Dress Up Doll"		0:41
16.	"Humanz"		1:55
17.	"The Thorax Bar"		1:53
18.	"Kabel Rescues Angie"		1:19
19.	"Blood Ball"		2:05
20.	"Interrogating Simon"		2:42
21.	"Kable Vs. Castle"		2:53
22.	"I Think It, You Do It"		4:38
23.	"Medley: I've Got You Under My Skin / Big Bad John / Night And Day"	Sammy Davis Jr.	6:32
Total length:			58:26

== Personnel ==
Credits adapted from liner notes:

- Composer and producer – Geoff Zanelli, Robert Williamson
- Programming – James Wilke, Justin Hosford
- Mixing – Jeff Biggers
- Mixing assistance – Adam Schmidt
- Guitar – Aaron Robinson, Brian Taylor, Geoff Zanelli
- Layout – Joe Chavez
- Art direction – Stephanie Mente
- A&R – Eric Craig
- Executive producer – Brian McNelis, Skip Williamson
