= Officer Downe (film) =

2016 film by Shawn Crahan

- Theatrical release poster
- Directed by: Shawn Crahan
- Written by: Joe Casey
- Based on: "Officer Downe" by: Chris Burnham; Joe Casey
- Produced by: Mark Neveldine
- Starring: Kim Coates; Sam Witwer; Lindsay Pulsipher; Reno Wilson; Mark Neveldine; Shad Gaspard
- Cinematography: Gerardo Madrazo
- Edited by: Meg Ramsay
- Music by: Kyle Sherrod; Gizmachi
- Distributed by: Magnet Releasing
- Release dates: June 2016 (LA Film Festival); November 18, 2016 (United States)
- Running time: 88 minutes
- Country: United States
- Language: English
- Box office: $850

Officer Downe is a 2016 American action thriller film directed by Shawn Crahan and produced by Mark Neveldine. It is a highly faithful adaptation of the original comic book of the same title.

== Plot ==
A deceased police officer, named Officer Downe, is resurrected from the dead to continue his war on crime.

Officer Gable is assigned to assist him and witnessed Downe's continuous resurrections each time after he is killed in his skirmishes with the criminals, and he's also healed from any injuries he suffered. Downe's regeneration is made possible through a group of mentally and physically disabled psychics. Gable also noticed that despite Downe's facade of emotionless coldness, he had shown a tender gratitude towards those psychics in his private moments.

Meanwhile Zen Master Flash, one of the major crime lords who can speak some broken Chinese, which had absolutely no impact on the plot, came up with a plan to take down Officer Downe. He lured Downe into a trap, capturing him and prevented recovery of his body and therefore his regeneration. The other crime lords including Mother Supreme arrived to torment the trapped Downe.

Desperate to help Downe, Gable appealed to the psychics to reach out to Downe with all they got. For the first time somehow, they managed to regenerate Officer Downe even though he was faraway from his base.

The revitalized Downe tore off Mother Supreme's leg and went after Zen Master Flash. Downe ended the confrontation by tearing off Zen Master Flash's googles which inexplicably included the latter's eyes, sending Zen Master Flash tumbling down the darkness where he vanished mysteriously.

Officer Downe once again silently gave his thanks to the psychics who had helped him, and the undead officer subsequently continues his war on crime.

== Cast ==
- Kim Coates as Officer Downe
- Tyler Ross as Officer Gable
- Lauren Vélez as Chief Berringer
- Glenn Howerton as Dominic
- Sam Witwer as Burnham
- Lindsay Pulsipher as Tiger
- Reno Wilson as Carter
- Mark Neveldine as Hazmat #1
- Adi Shankar as Crook #2
- Tracy Vilar as Hanso
- Shad Gaspard as Brick
- Corey Taylor as Headcase Harry
- Bruno Gunn as Fritch
- Meadow Williams as Mother Supreme
- Alison Lohman as Sister Blister
- Chris Fehn as Vulture

== Production ==
The film was first announced on July 15, 2013. Kim Coates was confirmed to play the lead role on February 20, 2015. The rest of the cast was confirmed on April 1, 2015.

Filming began in March 2015. Joe Casey, who created the comic series on which the film is based, wrote the film's screenplay. The first images from the film were revealed on May 15, 2015. In July 2015, the film was unveiled to buyers at the Berlin European Film Market where it was revealed Slipknot co-founder Shawn Crahan would direct in his feature debut having directed many of Slipknot's music videos. Producers Mark Neveldine and Skip Williams voiced excitement for the film comapring the stylistic leanings of the film to their previous effort Crank Discussing his involved role in the production, Casey who served as writer and producer on the project stated:

I like making things. It’s why I love doing comicbooks at Image Comics, in particular, where you have the most control of the actual making of the thing. I wanted that same kind of completely immersive experience when it came to this movie — that’s why I made sure I was a producer so I would be. And I certainly was involved. From writing the script to helping to pitch it to potential financiers to pre-production and principal photography to editing and VFX and all the other post-production details… I was there for absolutely all of it. So I wouldn’t have known how to sit on the sidelines. For a process junkie like me, being in the belly of the beast is where I had to be.

More images from the film were released on May 13, 2016. Producer Mark Neveldine confirmed that the film would be rated R by the MPAA.

It had its world premiere at the LA Film Festival in June 2016.

== Reception ==
Officer Downe received generally negative reviews. Review aggregator Rotten Tomatoes gives the film a 33% "fresh" rating with an average score of 4.9 out of 10. Scott Tobias, writing for Variety, called it a “thoroughly repugnant piece of comic-book juvenalia [sic].” Mike D’Angelo, critic for The A.V. Club wrote, “Officer Downe has no real story and no point of view-just endless, assaultive testosterone.”

IGN awarded it a score of 6.8 out of 10, saying "While it has some enjoyable moments, there are too many missed opportunities when the film could have taken it to the next level."
