= Mark Neveldine =

American filmmaker (born 1973)

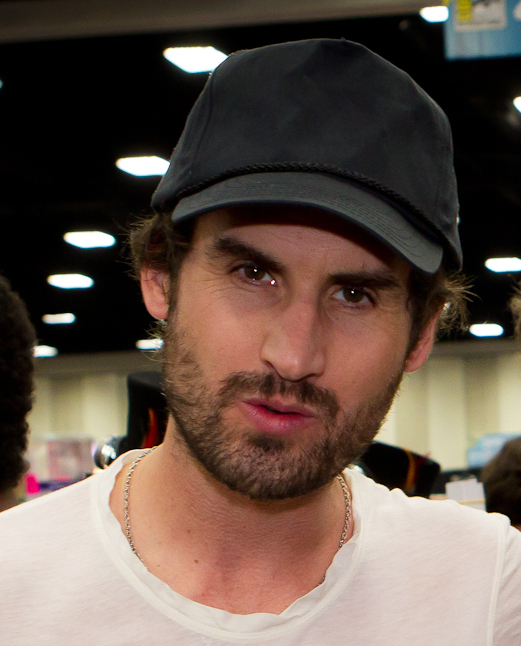
- Neveldine in 2011
- Born: May 11, 1973 (age 51); Watertown, New York, United States
- Occupations: Film director; film producer; screenwriter; camera operator
- Years active: 2006–present
- Spouse: Alison Lohman (m. 2009)
- Children: 3

Mark Neveldine (born May 11, 1973) is an American filmmaker. He is best known for frequently collaborating with Brian Taylor as Neveldine/Taylor.

== Early life and education ==
Neveldine was born in Watertown, New York, to Tom Neveldine and Carolyn Dowd Fitzpatrick. He attended college at Hobart and William Smith Colleges, where he studied drama and psychology.

== Career ==
After graduating, he moved to Manhattan, where he began his career as an actor, writer, and director of nearly thirty productions. He subsequently transitioned into film work, becoming a cinematographer on music videos, documentaries, and a television pilot.

Neveldine directed Ghost Rider: Spirit of Vengeance, the sequel to the Marvel Comics' superhero film Ghost Rider, alongside partner Brian Taylor.

Film critic Armond White praised the Neveldine/Taylor collaborations as "avant-garde".

== Personal life ==
Neveldine married actress Alison Lohman in Watertown, New York on August 19, 2009, at St. Anthony's Catholic Church. They have three children together.

== Filmography ==
With Brian Taylor

Year	Title	Director	Writer	Producer	Camera Operator
2006	Crank	Yes	Yes	Executive	Yes
2008	Pathology	No	Yes	Yes	Yes
2009	Crank: High Voltage	Yes	Yes	Executive	Yes
2009	Gamer	Yes	Yes	Executive	Yes
2010	Jonah Hex	No	Yes	No	No
2011	Ghost Rider: Spirit of Vengeance	Yes	No	No	Yes

Solo works

Year	Title	Director	Producer	Camera Operator	Notes
2015	The Vatican Tapes	Yes	No	No	
2016	Officer Downe	No	Yes	No	Also actor
2022	Panama	Yes	No	Yes	
