= Crank: High Voltage =

2009 American action film

- Theatrical release poster
- Directed by: Neveldine/Taylor
- Written by: Neveldine & Taylor
- Produced by: Gary Lucchesi; Tom Rosenberg; Skip Williamson; Richard Wright
- Starring: Jason Statham; Amy Smart; Clifton Collins Jr.; Efren Ramirez; Bai Ling; David Carradine; Dwight Yoakam
- Cinematography: Brandon Trost
- Edited by: Fernando Villena
- Music by: Mike Patton
- Production companies: Lakeshore Entertainment; RadicalMedia
- Distributed by: Lionsgate
- Release dates: April 15, 2009 (United Kingdom); April 17, 2009 (United States)
- Running time: 96 minutes
- Country: United States
- Language: English
- Budget: $13.5 million
- Box office: $34.6 million

Crank: High Voltage (alternately titled Crank 2: High Voltage) is a 2009 American action film written and directed by Neveldine/Taylor, and stars Jason Statham, Amy Smart, Clifton Collins Jr., Efren Ramirez, Bai Ling, David Carradine and Dwight Yoakam. It is the sequel to the 2006 film Crank and also features several cameo appearances of celebrities from various fields of entertainment. In the film, Chev Chelios (Statham) survives from the deadly fall and gets kidnapped by Chinese doctors, who harvest his heart and replace it with an artificial one, which is designed to keep him alive for an hour. Chev sets out to find his heart while keeping himself electrically charged to stay alive.

Crank: High Voltage was released in the United Kingdom on April 15, 2009, and was later released in North America on April 17, 2009. Critics were not given advance screening of the film. The film received praise for Statham's performance, but the film was criticised for being excessively violent, offensive and visually unappealing.

== Plot ==
Chev Chelios lands in the middle of an intersection after falling out of a helicopter. (Note: As depicted in Crank (2006)) He is scooped off the street by gangsters before ambulances get there. Three months later, he wakes up in a makeshift hospital and sees Chinese doctors removing his heart while Johnny Vang watches. The doctors place an artificial heart in his chest. Chev escapes, noticing an external battery pack attached to him.

Chev calls Doc Miles, a mafia surgeon, who says that Chev has been fitted with an AbioCor artificial heart. Once the external battery pack runs out, the internal battery will kick in and he will have 60 minutes before it stops working. Chev crashes his car, destroying the external battery pack. He asks a driver to use jumper cables on him to charge the internal battery. He tracks Vang to a social club, where a prostitute named Ria sends him to the strip club where Vang is hiding. In the club, Chev finds his girlfriend Eve, now working as a stripper. A group of Mexican mobsters, led by Chico, show up looking for Chev. Chev learns that a mobster named "El Hurón" ("The Ferret") wants to kill him, but he doesn't find out why.

Another stripper tells Chev to go to the Hollywood Park Racetrack for Vang. On the way, he meets Venus, the brother of Chev's deceased informant Kaylo. Wanting his help, Chev tells Venus that El Hurón was involved in Kaylo's death. At the horse track, Chev begins losing energy again. Doc Miles informs him that friction will cause static electricity to power the internal battery. Eve has sex with Chev on the racetrack, which generates enough friction to charge the heart. Chev spots Vang, who escapes. Don Kim picks Chev up in a limo. He informs Chev that there is a prominent Triad leader named Poon Dong, who was in need of a heart transplant and chose Chev's to replace his after learning how Chev survived the events of the last film. Chev kills Don Kim upon learning that Don Kim intends to hand him over to Poon Dong.

Chev boards an ambulance and steals a battery pack for his artificial heart. He chases Vang down and learns that his heart has already been transplanted into Poon Dong. Vang is shot and killed by Chico as Chev interrogates him and Chev is knocked unconscious. Doc Miles uses his secretary to lure Poon Dong into his apartment to kill him and retrieve Chev's heart.

Chev is taken to Catalina Island where it is revealed that El Hurón is the brother of Ricky and Alex Verona, both of whom Chelios killed. El Hurón reveals Ricky Verona's disembodied head in a glass tank; Ricky is being artificially kept alive long enough to watch El Hurón scourge Chelios to death. Venus and Ria arrive with backup, and a shootout ensues, breaking the glass tank. Chelios takes Ricky Verona's now-gasping head and kicks it into a pool. As he starts to slow down, he climbs a nearby electric pole and grabs a high voltage transformer to recharge. He is set ablaze by the massive current but becomes fully powered and beats El Hurón to death. Hallucinating Ria as Eve, he kisses her, inadvertently setting her ablaze. Burning to death, Chev walks towards the camera and gives the audience the middle finger, screaming.

During the end credits, Doc Miles replaces Chev's heart. Though Miles and Eve believe he has died, Chev's eyes open and his heart monitor indicates normal activity.

== Cast ==
- Jason Statham as Chev Chelios
  - Billy Unger as young Chev
- Amy Smart as Eve Lydon
- Efren Ramirez as Venus
- Dwight Yoakam as "Doc" Miles
- Reno Wilson as Orlando
- Clifton Collins Jr. as Jesus "El Hurón" Verona
- Geri Halliwell as Karen Chelios
- Art Hsu as Johnny Vang
- Bai Ling as Ria
- David Carradine as Poon Dong
- Corey Haim as Randy
- Keone Young as Don Kim
- Joseph Julian Soria as Chico
- Julanne Chidi Hill as "Dark Chocolate"
- Jose Pablo Cantillo as Ricky Verona
- Yeva-Genevieve Lavlinski as "Pepper"
- John de Lancie as "Fish" Halman

Celebrity cameos include Ron Jeremy, Ed Powers, Jenna Haze, Nick Manning, Lexington Steele, Chester Bennington, Glenn Howerton, Maynard James Keenan, Danny Lohner, Keith Jardine, Lauren Holly, and Lloyd Kaufman.

== Production ==
After the modest success of Crank at the box office, its directors Mark Neveldine and Brian Taylor were approached by Lionsgate Films to direct a sequel. Neveldine and Taylor refused, explaining that the idea "sounded ridiculous" and "kinda lame" as they had already "killed" its protagonist, Chev Chelios, at the end of Crank. According to producer Skip Williamson, the duo passed on the opportunity to direct because "they didn't think they could toughen themselves" due to the "outlandishness" of the first film and would rather stay on as screenwriters. The duo later became interested to direct the finished script; Taylor explained that he and Neveldine "had fallen in love with [the script] and we were not going to let anyone else touch it", believing no other director could direct it better than them. Taylor said the writing process was relatively "easier" on Crank 2 since the script picked up where the first film left off and adopted the same location and a few characters of the original. As such, Taylor saw the script as an opportunity to write Chelios's dialogue in the way that matched Statham's British vernacular, something he was unable to do on the first film since he had written the role specifically for an American actor before Statham was cast.

An October 2007 Variety report stated that Jason Statham was set to reprise his role as Chelios for Crank 2. Statham himself was thrilled to be on the sequel, stating he "was completely excited by how ludicrous and outrageous they made part two. This one takes it to the next level." According to Taylor, Statham called Crank 2 "the most fun movie I've read since Lock, Stock". An April 2008 Variety report announced that Amy Smart, Clifton Collins Jr., Bai Ling, Dwight Yoakam, and Efren Ramirez had joined the cast.

Filming lasted 31 days in Los Angeles, from April 28 to June 9, 2008. Locations that were used include the Port of Los Angeles, Inglewood, East and Downtown Los Angeles, Hollywood Park and the Los Alamitos Race Course where the sex scene between Chev and Eve was filmed. To achieve the same "hyper-kinetic visuals" of the first film, Neveldine, Taylor and cinematographer Brandon Trost acted as camera operators and photographed using "prosumer" high-definition camcorders including Canon's VIXIA HF-10 and XH-A1. The size and weight of these cameras provided the directors mobility (especially when Neveldine filmed chase scenes with Rollerblades on), and allowed them to capture from hard-to-reach areas and wrap filming quickly. Specialty rigs were also developed for the film, one of which was a piece of speed rail bent 180 degrees and mounted with a total of eight cameras that lent a bullet-time look reminiscent of The Matrix. Although the film looks noticeably handheld, Fig Rigs were used to keep scenes as stable as possible. Nearly 300 hours of footage was shot by the time filming was completed.

== Reception ==
=== Box office ===
Crank: High Voltage opened in 2,223 theaters in North America and grossed $6,963,565 with an average of $3,133 per theater and ranking #6 at the box office. The film ended up earning $13,684,249 domestically and $20,888,292 internationally for a total of $34,572,541.

=== Critical response ===
The film was not screened for critics. Rotten Tomatoes reported a score of 64%, with an average rating of 6.00/10, based on 72 reviews. The website's consensus reads, "Crank: High Voltage delivers on its promises: a fast-paced, exciting thrill ride that doesn't take itself too seriously." On Metacritic, the film earned "mixed or average reviews," with a weighted average of 41 out of 100 based on 15 reviews. Audiences surveyed by CinemaScore gave the film a grade of "C−" on a scale of A to F.

Critics assessed the film in comparison to the original, to mixed reactions. The Hollywood Reporter critic Frank Scheck said it "follows the same formula as the first, with one difference: They've managed to ramp up the action and vulgarity beyond the insane heights of the original." Chris Tilly for IGN UK said that "if anything, [the sequel] is even more outlandish and ridiculous than its predecessor." Rob Nelson for Variety wrote, "Yet another D.O.A. for the ADD era, Crank: High Voltage rewards the sizable cult audience of 2006's Crank with more of the same, only stupider." The New York Times critic Jeannette Catsoulis called it "boorish, bigoted and borderline pornographic" like the original. Both Stephanie Zacharek and Alexander Larman criticized how the sequel had dropped the "good-naturedness" of the original in favor of shocking the viewers with excessive profanity and mayhem; Larman said that "the sequel seems content to wallow in mean-spirited unpleasantness, apparently on the grounds that not enough films these days feature, say, graphic genital torture or a man slicing off his own nipples."

Nelson opined that the film is "[n]otable for being perhaps the first pic to feature an anal rape by shotgun (among countless other atrocities)", and called the public sex scene "borderline pornographic". Tilly noted the influence the Grand Theft Auto video game series had on the film due to its bloody violence and mayhem, commenting that "[b]oth the hunter and the hunted kill everything in their sights, resulting in blood-baths all over town." He and Zacharek considered both the anally-inserted shotgun and nipple self-mutilation scenes as some of the most unpleasant moments in the film, though both critics were divided on their reactions to the directors' approach in conveying these images. Tilly opined, "It's as if writer-directors Mark Neveldine and Brian Taylor have seen that people liked the holy trinity of sex, violence and bad language of their first film, and so injected ever-increasing amounts of all three into the sequel"; Zacharek was otherwise critical, writing, "The first time around, Neveldine and Taylor treated the movie's cartoony violence as a sick joke; this time around, it's an applied science, and the strain of their efforts shows." Adam Markovitz for Entertainment Weekly, however, complimented the film as "an eye-popping strobe of flesh and blood" albeit polarizing. Scheck wrote, "From Chev's sticking a shotgun barrel up a bad guy's ass to his final turning toward the camera to give the audience the finger, the film makes clear that subtlety is not part of the equation."

Some critics were displeased with how the film treated minorities. Catsoulis said the film "vigorously abuses Mexicans, Asians, women and the disabled with equal-opportunity glee." Larman pointed out what he saw as "extreme misogyny and racism", citing one usage of the racial slur "chink"; he noted that although "nothing should be off limits in comedy", the film only amounted to "flashy, arrogant emptiness". Zacharek found the homosexual jokes "particularly unsettling", and said the film treated Efren Ramirez's new role "as if he's as worthless as the women". Scheck wrote, however, "What makes [the film] all palatable is the comic lunacy injected into the proceedings, which often take on a decidedly surreal quality."

The film's visuals were also a subject of criticism. Nelson wrote, "As in Crank, high-def video shooting lends a suitably garish immediacy to the frenzied action. [...] The directors are content to replay the same Red Bull six-pack aesthetic — rack zooms, split-screens, and whiplash pans aplenty — with been-there-done-that disinterest." Zacharek complained that the actresses were "made to look as cheap and ugly as possible" by being "shot in hard light that highlights every skin flaw", and that the "choppy" camerawork made Jason Statham barely noticeable. Markovitz, however, said the film "is as visually stunning as it is absurdly offensive."

Zacharek said Statham lacked the energy and charisma he displayed in the original, lamenting that the sequel made him "[look] miserable, as if appearing in this lousy picture just sucked all the heart right out of him." Some critics, however, praised Statham's performance; Scheck said the actor "anchors the proceedings with his simmering charisma and impressive physicality", while Tilly called it one of his best efforts "with little seeming regard for his own physical well-being".

== Home media ==
Crank: High Voltage was released via DVD and Blu-ray on September 8, 2009, in the United States. At the DVD sales chart, Crank opened at No. 2, selling 305,000 units which translates to $5,345,078 in revenue. As per the latest figures, 827,000 units have been sold, acquiring revenue of over $15 million. This does not include Blu-ray sales or DVD rentals. In Germany, the uncut DVD and Blu-ray was released on March 31, 2010.

== Possible sequel ==
Regarding a third film, actress Smart said in 2009 that "It's been talked about." Smart also noted that Crank 3 might be made in 3D. During an 'Ask me anything' on Reddit, Brian Taylor gave a possible 2013 release date for Crank 3. In March 2015, Statham gave an update on the sequel, saying that he'd love to do it and he was waiting for Neveldine and Taylor to "get their heads together." Statham stated that Neveldine and Taylor "have a loose idea. They haven't written the script." In January 2018, Brian Taylor stated it would "be a while" until there was a Crank 3 due to profitability concerns and high expectations.

== Bibliography ==
- Neveldine, Mark; Taylor, Brian (2008). Tits Against The Glass: Making Crank 2 (Crank: High Voltage Blu-ray). Lionsgate Home Entertainment.
- "Crank: High Voltage Production Notes". Lionsgate Publicity. Lionsgate.
