= Yeva =

Yeva may refer to:

- Yeva, the Armenian, Russian, Ukrainian, and Mongolian equivalents of the name Eve
- Yeva (band), a Latin fusion band formed by Harold Hopkins Miranda
- Yeva (film), 2017 Armenian drama film directed by Anahit Abad
- Yeva sculptor, Israeli-French sculptor
- Yeva Vybornova (born 1974), Ukrainian fencer
- Yeva-Genevieve Lavlinski, actress and film director from the USSR

== See also ==
- Eve
- Yevanic language
- Yeva-Liv Island
