= Spirit of Vengeance =

Spirit of Vengeance may refer to:

- Spirits of Vengeance, a Marvel Comics species
- Spirit of Vengeance (comics), a Marvel Comics character
- Ghost Rider: Spirit of Vengeance, a 2011 American film

== See also ==
- Vengeful ghost, the spirit of a dead person who returns from the afterlife to seek revenge for a cruel, unnatural or unjust death
