= List of films shown at Butt-Numb-A-Thon =

The following is a list of films shown at the Butt-Numb-A-Thon film festival formerly held each December in Austin, Texas, and hosted by Ain't It Cool News founder Harry Knowles.

Feature films are listed in bold. Trailers are listed in italics. All other items are annotated as appropriate.

== Butt-Numb-A-Thon 1 (1999) ==
- **Plan 9 from Outer Space**
- **Magnolia**
- **Song of the South**
- **Fritz the Cat**
- **Fade to Black**
- **Phantom of the Paradise**
- **Calling All Girls**
- **Giant Gila Monster**
- **Pitch Black**, followed by special appearance by actor Vin Diesel.
- **Vampyres**
- **Tron**
- **Six String Samurai**

== Butt-Numb-A-Thon 2 (2000) ==
- **Destination Mars**
- **The Hobbit**
- **The Gift**
- **The Sea Wolf**
- **Wonder Bar**
- **Snatch**, followed by special appearance by actor Ade.
- **Beneath the Valley of the Ultra-Vixens**
- **Batman Beyond: Return of the Joker**
- **RoboCop**
- **Shogun Assassin**
- **Santa Claus' Story**
- **Ed Gein**, followed by special appearance by actor Steve Railsback.

== Butt-Numb-A-Thon 3 (2001) ==
- **Fiend Without a Face**
- **The Majestic**, preceded by pre-taped introduction from Director Frank Darabont.
- **Rock All Night**
- **King Kong**
- **Vanilla Sky**
- **Cabin in the Sky**
- Stunt Rock - this trailer is a BNAT classic and is always shown, typically early in the evening.
- Kid 'in Africa (short)
- **Blood Feast 2: All U Can Eat**, followed by a special appearance by Producer Jacky Lee Morgan.
- **Terror of Tiny Town**, followed by a special appearance by actor Clarence Swenson.
- **The Lord of the Rings: The Fellowship of the Ring**, preceded by a wacky pre-taped introduction from Director Peter Jackson and WETA Workshop guru Richard Taylor.

== Butt-Numb-A-Thon 4 (2002) ==
- **The Mask of Fu Manchu**
- **Chicago**
- **Machine-Gun Kelly**
- **Odds Against Tomorrow**
- **Crippled Avengers**
- **Night Warning**, followed by a special appearance by actor Bo Svenson.
- **May**
- Dust and Blood (short film)
- **House of 1000 Corpses**
- **Tiptoes**, a special "Director's Cut" that was introduced as representing the true vision of Director Matthew Bright.
- Raiders of the Lost Ark: The Adaptation (partial screening)
- **The Lord of the Rings: The Two Towers**

== Butt-Numb-A-Thon 5 (2003) ==
- **Haunted Gold**
- Adventures of Captain Marvel (partial screening of first episode)
- **The Lord of the Rings: The Return of the King** followed by Q&A with Director Peter Jackson, Writer Frances Walsh and Writer Philippa Boyens.
- **The General** with musical accompaniment from Guy Forsyth
- **Oldboy**
- Sky Captain and the World of Tomorrow
- **Nid de guepes**
- **Blind** (short film)
- **Ginger Snaps 2: Unleashed**
- **Haute Tension**
- **Teenage Mother**
- The Rotten Fruit
- **Undead**
- **The Passion of the Christ** followed by Q&A with Director Mel Gibson.

== Butt-Numb-A-Thon 6 (2004) ==
Dec. 11-12, 2004

- Putney Swope
- **Willie McBean and his Magic Machine**
- **Lemony Snicket's A Series of Unfortunate Events** followed by Q&A with actress Emily Browning and actor Liam Aiken.
- Madagascar (unfinished clips)
- **The Black Swan**
- The Hitchhiker's Guide to the Galaxy slide show/Q&A with Producer Robbie Stamp.
- **Blonde Venus**
- Legend of the Sacred Stone
- **Miss Sadie Thompson**
- War of the Worlds with video introduction from Steven Spielberg and Tom Cruise.
- **The Phantom of the Opera**
- Welcome Home, Brother Charles
- The Ring 2
- **The Mutations** and Q&A with Director Robert Weinbach.
- **Toys are Not for Children**
- **Layer Cake** and Q&A with actor Tamer Hassan.
- 2001 Maniacs (clip) with introduction from Director Eli Roth.
- Casshern
- **Ong-Bak**
- Time Piece (short)
- The Chronicles of Narnia: The Lion, the Witch and the Wardrobe (behind the scenes clips)
- **Kung Fu Hustle**

== The 7th Voyage of Butt-Numb-A-Thon (2005) ==
Dec. 10-11, 2005

- Apocalypto
- **The Most Dangerous Game**
- The Pit and the Pendulum by Ray Harryhausen
- **King Kong**
- **Footlight Parade**
- **Sick Girl**
- **Sympathy For Lady Vengeance**
- **The Professionals**
- **District B13**
- 2gether 4ever at Bloody-Disgusting.com, at Ain't It Cool News
- **Cigarette Burns**
- Hostel (unfinished clip) presented by Eli Roth.
- **The Descent**
- **Stunt Rock**
- **Drum**
- X-Men: The Last Stand
- Mission: Impossible III
- **Der Fuehrer's Face**
- **V for Vendetta**

== OctoButt-Numb-A-Thon (2006) ==
Dec. 9-10, 2006

- **Pan's Labyrinth** - this film was not part of the core BNAT line-up, but it was open to BNAT attendees the night before.
- Stunt Rock
- Raw Force
- Teenage Tramp
- The Telephone Book
- **Black Snake Moan** and Q&A with Director Craig Brewer.
- **Dreamgirls** and Q&A with Director Bill Condon.
- Panorama Blue
- Female Animal
- Baby Love
- Girls Are For Loving
- Underage
- **Once Upon a Girl**
- **Inherit the Wind**
- Rocky
- Rocky II
- Rocky III
- Rocky IV
- Rocky V
- **Rocky Balboa** with introduction by Sylvester Stallone.
- Fanboys preview.
- The Mafu Cage
- The Buttercup Chain
- PEPE
- Mantango
- **Knocked Up**
- Teen Wolf (snippet) - started as a joke; not shown in full.
- **Black Book**
- **The Informer**
- The Challenge of the Lady Ninja
- The Legend of Hillbilly John
- It Came Without Warning
- Cannibal Girls
- Curse
- **Raw Force**
- **Smokin' Aces**
- **300** and Q&A with Director Zack Snyder.
- **Children of Men** - this film was not part of the core BNAT line-up, but it was open to BNAT attendees the night after BNAT.

== Half-Ass-A-Thon (2007) ==
June 24–25, 2007

- Africa: Texas Style
- Drum
- Three the Hard Way
- Stunt Rock
- **Wonder Bar**
- Tarzan and the Brown Prince aka Tarzán y el arco iris
- Gymkata
- Death Ride aka Crash!
- The Taking of Pelham One Two Three
- Gambit
- (PSA) Clint Eastwood describes crack cocaine and warns the audience to avoid it.
- **Stardust** with introduction by Director Matthew Vaughn.
- Battle Beneath the Earth
- (advertisement) Starmaster for the Atari 2600
- The Magic Voyage of Sinbad aka Sadko
- (advertisement) Two Bic(c) lighters talk about refreshments that are available in the lobby.
- **Topkapi**
- Future Kill
- The Toy Box
- White Comanche aka Comanche Blanco
- Who?
- The Terrornauts
- Tarzan and the Jungle Boy
- **Impulse**
- **Seven Blows of the Dragon** aka **Shui Hu Zhuan**

== Big Trouble at Butt-Numb-A-Thon 9 (2007) ==
Dec. 8-9, 2007; Alamo Drafthouse at The Ritz, Austin, Texas

- Hobo with a Shotgun
- Popcorn
- Pinocchio's Birthday Party at IMDb
- Happy Birthday to Me at IMDb
- The Party Animal at IMDb
- Stunt Rock
- **The Great McGinty** at IMDb
- The 'Burbs at IMDb
- Bachelor Party
- Amin: The Rise and Fall
- **Charlie Wilson's War*** trailer
- A Bomb for a Dictator at IMDb
- Have Your Kids Immunized Today (Will Rogers Institute PSA)
- Mr. No Legs
- **Pickup on South Street** at IMDb
- The Secret of Magic Island at IMDb
- Big Trouble in Little China
- Thundercops
- **Mongol** trailer
- The Exterminator at IMDb
- Vintage In-Theater Pizza Advert
- Sorceress at IMDb
- **The Abominable Dr. Phibes** trailer
- Voyage of the Rock Aliens at IMDb
- Get Crazy at IMDb
- Freckles at IMDb
- **Sweeney Todd: The Demon Barber of Fleet Street*** trailer
- Blind Fury at IMDb
- Stop or My Mom Will Shoot
- **Lonely Are the Brave** at IMDb
- Man Beast at IMDb
- W.
- Three in the Cellar at IMDb
- The Evictors at IMDb
- **The Poughkeepsie Tapes*** (director/writer John Erick Dowdle, wife/star Stacy Chbosky, and writer Drew Dowdle attended but were unable to speak as scheduled due to studio demands)
- **Teen Lust** at IMDb
- "**The City on the Edge of Forever**" episode of Star Trek, broadcast in HD.
- Call Me Bwana at IMDb
- J.D.'s Revenge at IMDb
- Golden Needles at IMDb
- Black Samurai
- **Addio Zio Tom** | **Farewell Uncle Tom** at IMDb
- Halloween III: Season of the Witch at IMDb
- Nightmares
- Trick or Treat at IMDb
- **Trick 'r Treat*** with Q&A with director/writer Michael Dougherty. trailer

EXCLUSIVE CLIPS

- "Rambo" with on-screen text intro from Sylvester Stallone.
- "WALL-E" with intros and Q&A with producers.
- "The Chronicles of Narnia: Prince Caspian"
- "Fanboys" - Lucas Ranch interrogation filmed four days before BNAT

== The Ten Commandments of Butt-Numb-A-Thon (2008) ==
Dec. 13-14, 2008; Alamo Drafthouse South Lamar Austin, Texas

- Invasion U.S.A
- The Slumber Party Massacre
- Pinocchio's Birthday Party at IMDb
- Stunt Rock
- **Teen Wolf** first few minutes, ending with film burning. Guest appearance by Teen Wolf in yellow Beavers basketball uniform.
- **Viva Villa!**
- **The Curious Case of Benjamin Button**
- Atari 2600 commercial
- Case Study: Amphetamines
- La Joie de Vivre
- **Coraline** exclusive clips in 3-D
- Dr. Pepper commercial
- The Terrornauts
- **Sahara**
- Doc Savage: The Man of Bronze
- MegaForce
- The Villain
- **Valkyrie** with video intro by Director Bryan Singer.
- **Up** first 45 minutes, featuring unfinished portions and Q&A with co-directors Pete Docter and Bob Peterson.
- **Metropolis** with rare 1984 Giorgio Moroder soundtrack featuring popular 80s artists.
- **Monsters vs. Aliens** in 3D, with exclusive clips featuring unfinished portions and Q&A with filmmaker.
- Dimensionscope 3-D presentation
- Black Angels at IMdB
- Maximum Overdrive
- My Bloody Valentine
- The Devil Within Her at IMdB
- Metal Storm
- **My Bloody Valentine** in 3D, with introduction and Q&A by director Patrick Lussier and co-stars Jaime King and Megan Boone.
- **I Love You, Man** with video intro by Paul Rudd and Jason Segel
- Beastmaster 2
- C.H.O.M.P.S. at IMdB
- The Secret of Magic Island
- **White Dog**
- **Push** exclusive clips
- **Know1ng** exclusive clip
- **Observe and Report** exclusive clips with video intro by Seth Rogen.
- **Terminator Salvation** exclusive clips with guest appearance by Director McG.
- **Watchmen** first 22 minutes of film, with guest appearance by actor Jackie Earle Haley.
- Voodoo Woman
- Jim Henson's Time Piece
- Latino Encounter
- Amin
- Frosted Pop-Tarts commercial
- Mission Thunderbolt at IMdB
- **Che**

== BNAT 1138 (2009) ==
December 12–13, 2009: Alamo Drafthouse South Lamar, Austin, Texas

The name derives from the film THX 1138, as this was the 11th edition of Butt-Numb-A-Thon and the celebration of Knowles' 38th birthday.

- 99 & 44/100% Dead at IMDB
- Death Machines
- The Uncanny
- Stunt Rock
- Teen Wolf - Opening credits and first scene, with the projector burning through the actual film stock per BNAT tradition. This time, Alamo Drafthouse owner Tim League announced that a new remastered digital version had been found, and a man (Scott Weinberg, managing editor of Cinematical) wearing a Dolby T-shirt—who claimed to be from Dolby and called himself Thomas Dolby—promised to write the Drafthouse a check for $15,000 if the film failed to play correctly. Of course, it did not, and the screen quickly filled with static.
- **Faust** (with live organ accompaniment by Graham Reynolds)
- The Rape Killer at IMDB
- Ricky Schroeder PSA about dealing with abusive situations, dubbed in Spanish
- **The Lovely Bones**
- That's Dancing
- Nudes on Tiger Reef at IMDB
- The Fastest Guitar Alive
- **Girl Crazy**
- Attack of the 50-Foot Woman
- Candy Candido - "One Meatball" (music video)
- **The Red Shoes**
- Beer-chugging contest between teams consisting of a BNAT attendee, Broken Lizard and Tim League, and members of the Ain't It Cool News staff (including Mr. Beaks, Massawyrm, Merrick, Capone and Harry).
- They Call Her One Eye
- Sudden Death
- **Shutter Island**
- James Tont Operazione U.N.O.
- Maniac Cop 2
- Doc Savage: The Man of Bronze
- **Le Magnifique**
- **Micmacs à tire-larigot**
- The Ski Bum at IMDB
- Hot Dog: The Movie
- **Frozen** with introduction by Director Adam Green.
- Bug
- Mission Thunderbolt
- **Centipede Horror** at IMDB
- The Honeymoon Killers at IMDB
- Mr. No Legs at IMDB
- Lunch Wagon
- **The Candy Snatchers**
- Clip of Asian men dressed as sumo wrestlers being attacked by aroused dogs.
- AICN - True-ish Hollywood Story featuring taped greetings, memories and sarcastic comments for Harry's birthday from Jon Favreau, Danny McBride, Damon Lindelof, Alex Kurtzman, Roberto Orci, J. J. Abrams and Michael Bay. Produced by Paramount Pictures.
- Iron Man 2 (world premiere of trailer with video introduction by director Jon Favreau)
- Fearless Frank at IMDB
- Animal Protector at IMDB
- Captain Invincible
- **Kick-Ass** followed by Q&A with Director Matthew Vaughn and star Christopher Mintz-Plasse.
- The Adventures of Buckaroo Banzai
- I Come in Peace
- Dr. Pepper Post-Cola Wars commercial
- **Avatar**

== Butt-Numb-A-Thon: The Dirty Dozenth (2010) ==
Dec. 11-12, 2010; Alamo Drafthouse South Lamar Austin, Texas

- **True Grit**
- **Le Samouraï**
- **On The Town**
- Cowboys & Aliens (approximately 40 mins) with in-person intros by Director Jon Favreau, and Producers Ron Howard and Bob Orci.
- Rango Eight-minute exclusive clip with video intro by Director Gore Verbinski.
- **Santa Fe Trail**
- **The Fighter**
- **The Hunchback of Notre Dame**
- **Chimes at Midnight**
- **Richard Pryor: Live in Concert**
- **The Green Hornet**
- **Hobo With a Shotgun**
- **Drive Angry** with in-person intro by Director Patrick Lussier.
- **Tron: Legacy** (BNAT attendees were bussed to the Bob Bullock Texas State History Museum IMAX theater to see the film in IMAX 3D)

== Butt-Numb-A-Thon: ThirTEEN WOLF, aka BNAT13WOLF (2011) ==
Dec. 10-11, 2011; Alamo Drafthouse South Lamar Austin, Texas

The name derives from the long-standing tradition of playing the 1985 movie Teen Wolf at BNAT, only to have the film burn or be destroyed before any significant portion is screened. Tim League, founder and CEO of the Alamo Drafthouse told Jeff Mahler (a longtime BNAT attendee whose love for Teen Wolf inspired its unsuccessful inclusion in the festival each year) that the film would be screened at BNAT13WOLF, but that due to scheduling demands the pristine 35mm print film they had found had to be cut into "literally thousands of pieces" and edited into the program whenever time was available. Clips that highlighted the entirety of Teen Wolf were then inserted into the sequences of themed trailers that preceded all of the feature films. The actual clips were in extremely small segments of less than two seconds each. Most often they were only a few frames in length - a hilarious image from the movie popping up and disappearing in a flash.

- Video message from Eric Vespe, Peter Jackson, Orlando Bloom, Ian McKellen and other cast and crew members of The Hobbit: An Unexpected Journey
- Stunt Rock
- Mini Teen Wolf clip
- Teen Wolf Too
- An American Werewolf in London
- **Hugo**
- **Le Voyage dans la lune (aka A Trip to the Moon)** (with live organ accompaniment by Graham Reynolds.)
- Mini Teen Wolf clip
- Nightflyers
- The Apple
- Mini Teen Wolf clip
- The War Between the Planets (aka Il pianeta errante)
- **Just Imagine**
- The Killer Elite
- Mini Teen Wolf clip
- The Spy Who Came in from the Cold
- Mini Teen Wolf clip
- Top Secret
- **Tinker Tailor Soldier Spy**, preceded by video introduction by Director Tomas Alfredson and star Gary Oldman.
- 35 Movies in Two Minutes
- The Cheap Detective
- Less Than Zero
- Mini Teen Wolf clip
- Young Sherlock Holmes
- **Sherlock Holmes: A Game of Shadows**, preceded by video intro by director Guy Ritchie.
- The TRON Holiday Special
- The Hand
- The Devil's Hand
- Mini Teen Wolf clip
- **The Beast with Five Fingers**
- The Hobbit: An Unexpected Journey (3 times) [Originally intended to be shown first, delayed due to technical issues]
- The Fabulous World of Jules Verne
- Popeye
- G.I. JOE: Retaliation
- **The Adventures of Tintin: The Secret of the Unicorn**
- The Devil Inside [Red-band trailer with attendees given shot glasses filled with alcohol and a candy cane]
- Redzilla
- Von Richthofen and Brown
- Spirited Away
- **Porco Rosso**
- To the Devil a Daughter
- The Dungeon Master
- The Evil Dead
- **The Cabin in the Woods**
- clips from UHF
- Ghost Rider: Spirit of Vengeance behind-the-scenes clip
- Race with the Devil
- **Ghost Rider: Spirit of Vengeance** followed by Q&A with co-director Brian Taylor.
- Wolf
- Mini Teen Wolf clip
- The Company of Wolves
- Mini Teen Wolf clip
- Wolfen
- Butt Drugs
- **The Grey**, followed by a Q&A with Producer Jules Daly.
- **Mission: Impossible – Ghost Protocol** (BNAT attendees were bussed to the Bob Bullock Texas State History Museum IMAX theater to see the film in IMAX 70mm)

== Butt-Numb-A-Thon 14: The Lucky Number (2012) ==
Dec. 8-9 2012; Alamo Drafthouse South Lamar Austin, Texas

- Ain't It Cool with Harry Knowles sizzle reel
- **Teen Wolf** (except the final scene and credits, as the film melted twice)
- Star Trek Into Darkness (theatrical trailer preview)
- **The Hobbit: An Unexpected Journey** in 48 fps RealD 3D, with in-person intro by director/writer/producer Peter Jackson, writer/producer Fran Walsh and writer/co-producer Philippa Boyens, and followed by Q&A with Peter Jackson
- G.I. Joe: Retaliation with video intro by Dwayne Johnson, aka "The Rock"
- Video clip of Eleanor Powell at 1981 AFI tribute for Fred Astaire
- **Broadway Melody of 1940**
- All Hands on Deck
- Kingdom in the Clouds
- Munchies
- **The Gang's All Here**
- The Wishing Machine
- Women in Cell Block 7 with Spanish subtitles
- **Mama** followed by Q&A with Producer Guillermo del Toro, Director Andres Muschietti and Writer Barbara Muschietti.
- Pacific Rim (trailer premiere), followed by Q&A with Director Guillermo del Toro.
- World War Z rough cut opening footage with video intro by Brad Pitt
- A Midsummer Night's Sex Comedy
- Will Success Spoil Rock Hunter?
- What's Up, Doc?
- **Libeled Lady**
- Video birthday message to Harry from Simon Pegg and Nick Frost.
- **Fateful Findings**
- Evil Dead clip
- Judex
- Jerrico the Wonder Clown
- Carnival of Blood
- **Nightmare Alley**
- Tougher Than Leather
- Dead Heat
- Amazon Women on the Moon
- **White Heat**
- The Heat red band trailer and 2 scenes with in-person intro by director Paul Feig, followed by Q&A with Paul Feig.
- The Blood of Heroes
- They Call Her One Eye
- **Rollerball**
- Streets of Fire
- The Warriors
- Southern Comfort
- Stunt Rock
- Pain & Gain trailer, with video intro by Director Michael Bay.
- **Bullet to the Head**

== Butt-Numb-A-Thon 15 (2013) ==
Dec. 7-8 2013; Alamo Drafthouse Ritz Austin, Texas

- **The Wolf of Wall Street** (A small live marching band took the front of the stage & confetti was released during the end credits)
- **Harlequin**
- **The Hobbit: The Desolation of Smaug**
- **The Agony and the Ecstasy** (Shown in 70mm format)
- **Cheatin'**
- **Popeye**
- **The Dragon Lives Again**
- **The Loves of Edgar Allan Poe**
- **Digging Up The Marrow** (Director Adam Green showed an unfinished version of his upcoming film.)
- **The Haunted Palace**
- **The Fruit Is Swelling**
- **The Wind Rises**

== Butt-Numb-A-Thon: 16 BNAT Candles (2014) ==
Dec. 13-14 2014; Alamo Drafthouse South Lamar Austin, Texas

- **Hooper**
- **Kingsman: The Secret Service**, delivered by Samuel L. Jackson with a Q&A prior to the start
- **The King and The Mockingbird**
- **Inherent Vice**
- **The Interview**, delivered by Seth Rogen with a fireworks intro and a Q&A after
- **1941**
- **Captain Courageous**
- **Million Dollar Mermaid**
- **Santiago Violenta**
- **A Christmas Horror Story**
- **Son of Kong**
- **The Hobbit: The Battle of the Five Armies**

== Butt-Numb-A-Thon Episode 17: The Ass Awaits! (2015) ==
Dec. 12-13 2015; Alamo Drafthouse South Lamar Austin, Texas

Held in the Holly Blain Memorial Theater

- **Gunga Din**
- **Southern Comfort**
- **Syncopation**
- **Eddie the Eagle**
- **The Tale of the Fox**
- **Anomalisa**
- **Phantasm**
- **The Angry Red Planet**
- **Ninja Busters**
- **Logan's Run**
- **The Revenant**

== Butt-Numb-A-Thon 18 Psycho (2016) ==
Dec. 10-11 2016; Alamo Drafthouse South Lamar Austin, Texas

Held in the Holly Blain Memorial Theater

- **Silence**
- **Deluge**
- **Fences**
- **Long Live the King**
- Kong: Skull Island (2 scenes)
- **A Cure for Wellness** (with introduction by actor Dane DeHaan and Director Gore Verbinski)
- Valerian and the City of a Thousand Planets (clips)
- **Brigadoon**
- **"Pimpernel" Smith**
- **The Adventures of Robin Hood**
- **Zachariah**
- Logan (first 40 minutes followed by Q&A with Director James Mangold)
- **Hard Boiled**
