= Gamer (2009 film) =

2009 American science fiction action film

- Theatrical release poster
- Directed by: Neveldine/Taylor
- Written by: Neveldine & Taylor
- Produced by: Tom Rosenberg; Gary Lucchesi; Skip Williamson; Richard Wright
- Starring: Gerard Butler; Michael C. Hall; Amber Valletta; Logan Lerman; Terry Crews; Chris "Ludacris" Bridges; Kyra Sedgwick
- Cinematography: Ekkehart Pollack
- Edited by: Peter Amundson; Fernando Villena
- Music by: Robert Williamson; Geoff Zanelli
- Production companies: Lionsgate; Lakeshore Entertainment
- Distributed by: Lionsgate
- Release date: September 4, 2009
- Running time: 95 minutes
- Country: United States
- Language: English
- Budget: $50 million
- Box office: $42 million

Gamer is a 2009 American science fiction action film written and directed by Mark Neveldine and Brian Taylor. The film stars Gerard Butler as a participant in an online game in which participants can control human beings as players, and Logan Lerman as the player who controls him. Alongside Butler and Lerman, it also stars Michael C. Hall, Ludacris, Amber Valletta, Terry Crews, Alison Lohman, John Leguizamo, Sam Witwer and Zoë Bell.

Gamer was released in North America on September 4, 2009, receiving generally negative reviews from critics and was a box-office bomb, grossing $42 million worldwide against a production budget of $50 million.

== Plot ==
In 2034, computer programmer Ken Castle invents self-replicating nanites that replace brain tissue and allow humans to control other humans' actions and see through their eyes. The first application of Castle's "Nanex" technology is a virtual community life simulation game, Society, which allows gamers to manipulate live actors as their avatars. Society becomes a worldwide sensation, making Castle the richest man in the world. He then creates Slayers, a third-person shooter where the "characters" are death-row prisoners using real weapons in specially designated areas. Unlike Society actors, Slayers participants are not paid; instead, they volunteer, and any Slayer who survives 30 matches will earn their freedom. John "Kable" Tillman is everyone's favorite, having survived a record 27 matches, and is controlled by 17-year-old gamer Simon Silverton.

An activist organization called the "Humanz" hacks a talk-show interview with Castle and claims that his technology will one day be used to control people against their will. The Humanz also disrupts Society play, but Castle sees both these actions as trivial. However, Castle feels threatened by Kable's winning streak and introduces a new inmate into Slayers, Hackman, specifically to kill Kable. Unknown to anyone else, Hackman will not be controlled by a player, thus not be handicapped by the "ping" that causes a small but dangerous delay between the player's command and the Slayer's action.

Kable's estranged wife, Angie, works as a Society character, but in spite of her earnings, she is refused custody of their daughter, Delia, who has been placed with a wealthy foster family.

The Humanz contact Kable and Simon separately and offer to create a mod that will let him escape, but only if Simon relinquishes control during the game. Simon is even given a mod to speak freely to Kable. The escape is successful, and news outlets report that Kable has been fragged, which puts Simon in a difficult position: he is labeled a "cheater", locked out of his account which is spammed with hate mail, his father's asset frozen, and arrested by the FBI for helping Kable escape.

Kable is brought to the Humanz' hideout; he refuses to help their fight against Castle but learns of Angie's current location in Society. He rescues her, escaping from both Hackman and Castle's security forces. Gina, the talk show host who secretly assists the Humanz, meets them. The Humanz deactivates the nanites in Angie and Kable's brains, and Kable remembers that the original nanites were tested on him while he was still in the military. Under Castle's control, Kable shot and killed his best friend and was imprisoned.

Upon learning that Castle is the wealthy father who adopted Delia, Kable infiltrates his mansion to get her back. He locates Castle, who reveals that his henchmen have already tracked down the Humanz' lair and killed all of them. He also reveals that 98% of his own brain has been replaced with nanites, but this allows him to control others rather than be controlled. He plans to release airborne nanites, which will infect the entire country within six months, giving him ultimate control. Hackman attacks Kable, who easily kills him. Kable then attacks Castle but is frozen in place as Castle explains that his men have reactivated his and Angie's nanites. Unknown to Castle, Gina and Trace escape and patch into the Nanex, exposing the confrontation to the world and exposing Castle's plans worldwide. They also restore Simon's account, restoring access of Kable.

Castle tries to manipulate Kable into killing his own daughter, but he resists, allowing Simon to control him and attack Castle. He and Simon wrestle for control, but Kable tells Castle to imagine his knife stabbing him. Castle unconsciously does so, allowing Kable to kill him and removing his control over everyone. With Castle dead, Kable convinces his technicians to deactivate the Nanex, freeing all the "characters" in Society and Slayers.

== Cast ==
- Gerard Butler as John "Kable" Tillman, the highest-ranked warrior in the game Slayers.
- Amber Valletta as Angie "Nika" Roth Tillman, Kable's wife, an avatar in Society.
- Michael C. Hall as Ken Castle, the wealthy, manipulative, ruthless and famous creator of Society and Slayers, and a top genius professional computer programmer.
- Kyra Sedgwick as Gina Parker Smith, a famous talk show host who meets the Humanz and investigates them.
- Logan Lerman as Simon Silverton, the 17-year-old gamer "playing" Kable.
- Ariana Scott as Shelley Silverton aka SISSYPUSS, the sister of Simon
- Terry Crews as Hackman, a psychopathic inmate sent to murder Kable.
- Alison Lohman as Trace, a member of the Humanz.
- Ludacris as Brother, the spokesperson and leader of the Humanz.
- Aaron Yoo as Dude, a member of the Humanz and a hacker.
- John Leguizamo as Freek, an inmate who befriends Kable.
- Ramsey Moore as Gorge
- Zoë Bell as Sandra, an inmate.
- Mimi Michaels as Stikkimuffin, another teenage gamer. A fan of Simon.
- Ashley Rickards as 2KATCHAPREDATOR (a girl dating an inmate)
- Jade Ramsey and Nikita Ramsey as the KUMDUMPSTAZ (British twins)
- Milo Ventimiglia as Rick Rape
- Jonathan Chase as Geek Leader, the head of Castle's technical team.
- Keith David as Agent Keith, a CIA agent.

Joseph D. Reitman and John de Lancie appear as senior members of Castle’s company. Lloyd Kaufman appears as Genericon. James Roday Rodriguez and Maggie Lawson cameo as news anchors. Michael Weston appears as one of Smith's producers. Sam Witwer appears as a social worker.

== Production ==
=== Development ===
In May 2007, Lakeshore Entertainment re-teamed with Mark Neveldine and Brian Taylor, the creators of Crank (2006), to produce a "high-concept futuristic thriller" called Game. Neveldine and Taylor wrote the script for Game and were slated to direct the film, while actor Gerard Butler was cast into the lead role.

=== Filming ===
Principal photography took place in Albuquerque, New Mexico for a 53-day shoot. Filming was at the Albuquerque Studios and on location around Albuquerque. Multistory sets were built on parking lots in downtown Albuquerque to depict buildings that were blown up in the film, and other sets were built on the back lots near the studios. The crew used special hand-held Red One digital cameras, which allowed the special effects team to begin work, normally done in post-production, after each day's shooting.

=== Title ===
In March 2009, the film's working title was changed from Game to Citizen Game. In May 2009, another name change was announced, the new name being Gamer.

== Release ==
The film was released in Indonesia as Slayers in 2010.

== Reception ==
=== Box office ===
Gamer had an opening day gross of $3.3 million and ranked fourth at the box office. In total, the film earned $9.2 million in its opening weekend. Overall, the film grossed $21.5 million in the United States and Canada, and $20.7 million in other territories for worldwide cumulative of $42 million, against its $50 million budget.

=== Critical reception ===
On the review aggregator website Rotten Tomatoes, 30% of 81 critics' reviews are positive, with an average rating of 4.4/10. The website's consensus reads: "With all of the hyperkinetic action and none of the flair of Mark Neveldine and Brian Taylor's earlier work, Gamer has little replay value." Metacritic, which uses a weighted average, assigned the film a score of 27 out of 100, based on 13 critics, indicating "generally unfavorable" reviews. Audiences surveyed by CinemaScore gave the film a grade "C" on scale of A to F.

Critic Joe Neumaier of The New York Daily News called it a "Xerox of a Xerox" and cited a number of films it supposedly takes elements from, including The Matrix and Rollerball. RVA Magazine wrote that Gamer's plot was overly similar to The Condemned and commented that Gamer "hates its primary audience" and "tries to criticize the commercialization of violence, even though it itself is commercialized violence".

Cultural critic Steven Shaviro authored a 10,000 word defense and analysis of the film that he posted online, and eventually re-worked into the penultimate chapter of his book, Post-Cinematic Affect (Zer0 Books, 2010).
