= Jonah Hex (film) =

2010 film

- Theatrical release poster
- Directed by: Jimmy Hayward
- Screenplay by: Neveldine & Taylor
- Story by: William Farmer; Neveldine & Taylor
- Based on: Characters appearing in comic books published by DC Comics
- Produced by: Akiva Goldsman; Andrew Lazar
- Starring: Josh Brolin; John Malkovich; Megan Fox; Michael Fassbender; Will Arnett; Michael Shannon
- Cinematography: Mitchell Amundsen
- Edited by: Fernando Villena; Kent Beyda; Tom Lewis
- Music by: Marco Beltrami; Mastodon
- Production companies: Legendary Pictures; DC Entertainment; Weed Road Pictures; Mad Chance Productions
- Distributed by: Warner Bros. Pictures
- Release date: June 18, 2010
- Running time: 81 minutes
- Country: United States
- Language: English
- Budget: $47 million
- Box office: $11 million

Jonah Hex is a 2010 American Western superhero film based on the DC Comics character of the same name. Directed by Jimmy Hayward (in his live-action directorial debut) from a screenplay by Neveldine/Taylor, the film stars Josh Brolin in the title role, alongside John Malkovich, Megan Fox, Michael Fassbender, Will Arnett and Michael Shannon.

Produced by Legendary Pictures, Andrew Lazar's Mad Chance Productions and Akiva Goldsman's Weed Road Pictures, the film was released on June 18, 2010, by Warner Bros. Pictures. It was a commercial failure, having grossed only $11 million against a budget of $47 million, and received negative reviews from critics.

== Plot ==
Confederate soldier Jonah Hex refuses an order from his commanding officer Quentin Turnbull to burn down a hospital and is forced to kill Turnbull's son Jeb, his best friend, who had drawn a pistol on Hex. A vengeful Turnbull later tracks Hex down at his residence, killing Hex's wife Cassie and son Travis via a house fire and branding Hex's face with a hot iron, leaving the initials "QT"; Hex later removes the branding with a red-hot tomahawk, resulting in his disfigured visage. The Crow people find Hex near death and heal him, enabling him to temporarily resurrect and communicate with the dead. Turnbull fakes his death in a hotel fire and Hex, unable to seek revenge, becomes a bounty-hunter.

In 1876, a gang of men led by Turnbull hijack a train carrying components of an experimental weapon invented by Eli Whitney. Realizing that Turnbull is planning to rebuild the weapon and use it to attack the U.S. on the Fourth of July, President Ulysses S. Grant instructs Army Lieutenant Grass to find Hex and hire him to track down and stop Turnbull. Grass' men find Hex in a brothel with a prostitute named Lilah Black and inform him that Turnbull is still alive.

Hex travels to meet Grass at his encampment and interrogates a dead soldier, who tells Hex to find former Confederate Colonel Slocum, another associate of Hex's who betrayed his family. At an illegal death match pavilion in South Carolina run by Dr. Cross Williams, Slocum refuses to reveal Turnbull's location to Hex and sarcastically suggests asking Jeb. Enraged, Hex throws Slocum into the fighting ring where the gladiator, a bestial snakelike creature, attacks and kills him. After burning the pavilion down, Hex travels to Gettysburg, Pennsylvania and excavates Jeb's body to ask him for assistance. Following a brief fight between them, Jeb accepts Hex's apology for killing him, grudgingly reveals that his father is at Fort Resurrection, and warns Hex to avoid death because many in the afterlife have plans for him. Hex then purchases several pieces of new weaponry from Smith (Lance Reddick), an armorer who notes Jonah's hatred of the Union stems from a stubbornness to adhere to the rules of government rather than mere Southern loyalty.

Upon arrival at the fort, Hex confronts Turnbull and kills several men before he is shot point blank in the chest, forcing him to retreat to the Crow people on horseback. Turnbull orders his assistant Burke, who helped kill Hex's family, to track down something Hex loves and bring it to him so that he can bait Hex. While Hex is being healed, Burke locates and kidnaps Lilah. Turnbull assembles the weapon and tests it by completely destroying a small town in Georgia.

After sending a message to Grass which both reveals Turnbull's location and requests backup, Hex travels to Independence Harbor, infiltrates Turnbull's ironclad warship, and kills Burke before resurrecting and subsequently incinerating him. Turnbull holds Lilah at gunpoint and forces Hex to surrender. Hex and Lilah escape their holding cell as Grass arrives and attempts to arrest Turnbull. Grass and his crew are destroyed by the weapon and Turnbull begins his attack on Washington, D.C.

During his scuffle with Turnbull, Hex jams the weapon with his hatchet before locking Turnbull's neck in the machine. He and Lilah escape the boat just as the chemical orb ignites in the engine room, which causes the weapon to backfire and explode, killing Turnbull and all of his men. The next day, Grant gives him a large reward and a full pardon before offering him a job as Sheriff of the entire United States. He declines but assures the president that he can be located and contacted if necessary, before departing with Lilah. Sometime later, Hex visits Jeb's grave and apologizes for his father's death before riding off.

== Cast ==
- Josh Brolin as Jonah Hex: A disfigured bounty-hunter who is the film's anti-heroic protagonist. Brolin initially hated the script, but changed his mind after growing to like its tongue-in-cheek tone.
- John Malkovich as Quentin Turnbull: The main antagonist who murdered Jonah Hex's family and disfigured the former.
- Megan Fox as Lilah Black: A gun-wielding prostitute and Jonah's love interest, whose real name is Tallulah Black. Though her performance was widely critiqued at the time, Fox would later remark that "I shouldn't have been nominated for an Oscar for it, [but] I'm definitely not bad in it."
- Michael Fassbender as Burke: A bowler-hat-wearing, tattooed and psychopathic Irishman who is Turnbull's right-hand man. Fassbender likens his character to that of The Riddler and Malcolm McDowell's performance in A Clockwork Orange, saying he mainly found his character when he tried on the derby bowler.
- Will Arnett as Lieutenant Grass: A Union soldier who enlists Hex as a bounty-hunter.
- Michael Shannon as Dr. Cross Williams: The ringleader of a gladiator circus. The studio planned to have Williams in a recurring character if a sequel surfaced.
- Wes Bentley as Adleman Lusk: A corrupt politician.
- Aidan Quinn as Ulysses S. Grant: The 18th President of the United States (Quinn was on set for only 3 days for this role).
- Lance Reddick as Smith: An armorer of sorts who supplies Hex with his new weapons.

The film also includes John Gallagher, Jr. as Lieutenant Evan, Tom Wopat as Colonel Slocum, and Julia Jones as Cassie; as well as an uncredited Jeffrey Dean Morgan as Jeb Turnbull. Mastodon guitarist/vocalist Brent Hinds also made a small cameo appearance.

Prior to Brolin's casting, actor Thomas Jane petitioned the studio for the role by hiring a makeup artist to give him the appearance of Jonah Hex. Jane instead voiced Hex in the 2010 animated short DC Showcase: Jonah Hex.

== Production ==
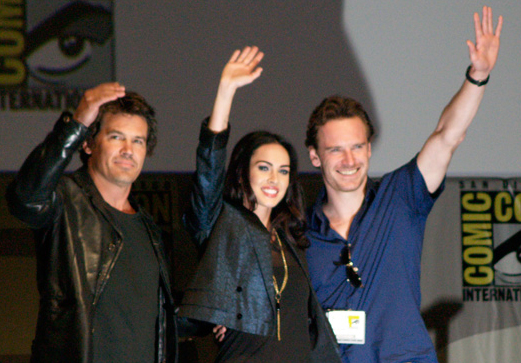
Josh Brolin, Megan Fox and Michael Fassbender promoting the film at the 2009 San Diego Comic-Con.

In 2000, 20th Century Fox developed a one-hour television adaptation based on the character, with producers Akiva Goldsman and Robert Zappia involved, but the project never came to fruition. In July 2007, Warner Bros. Pictures held the film rights to the character and sought to make a film. Goldsman paired with Andrew Lazar as producers, and Mark Neveldine and Brian Taylor wrote the screenplay, which adapted an incarnation of the comic books that combined the Western genre with supernatural elements. In October 2008, Josh Brolin entered talks to be cast as Jonah Hex under the direction of Neveldine and Taylor. The following month, Neveldine and Taylor stepped down from being directors due to creative differences with the studio. The studio explored the possibility of hiring Andy Fickman or McG and by January 2009, it chose Jimmy Hayward (who previously directed Horton Hears a Who!) to direct Jonah Hex. By the following February, Brolin was set to star alongside John Malkovich, who was cast as the antagonist Quentin Turnbull. Filming began in Louisiana in April 2009. Director Francis Lawrence was brought in to supervise a number of reshoots.

Brolin would later admit that he hated the experience making the film stating that at one point they had to "[reshoot] 66 pages in 12 days", implying that the filming schedule was hectic. He would go on to blame the film's failure on studio interference in the film's post-production. While he also called Hayward "inexperienced" and a "bad choice (of director)," he doesn't necessarily "blame it all at him, because that was my choice, that was my bad choice." Initially Megan Fox was also very critical of the movie stating she doesn't even want her kids to see it: "It would be nice to make some things that they can see, yeah, because something like Jennifer's Body I'm not going to let them see for a long time. Something like Jonah Hex I'm not going to let them see ever, no one should ever see that movie." Her feelings about it eventually softened, later calling it a "decent" movie: "While I shouldn't have been nominated for an Oscar for it, I'm definitely not bad in it".

== Music ==
Sludge metal band Mastodon scored the film. Troy Sanders, bassist/vocalist of Mastodon, on their contribution to the film:

"Some of it was heavy, some of it was very moody. A lot of it was spacey, Melvins B-sides, Pink Floyd-like, surreal outer space, like Neil Young's Dead Man. Swirling, nausea music". Sanders added that the collaboration felt natural: "Since day one, we've always written albums thinking the music was the score of a movie. Then we'll create the lyrics or storyline on top of that, as if we're writing the dialog to match the movie's cinematography".

The soundtrack is an hour-long instrumental, including five full songs and numerous smaller musical themes. Selections were added to scenes in the film by composer John Powell (Shrek, The Bourne Identity), and others were adapted for the London Orchestra for exceptionally epic moments. Sanders explained: "We wrote variations on themes for each character, different variables for a bunch of riffs: faster, slower, heavier, lighter. It's the Darth Vader approach".

== Release ==
=== Theatrical ===
The film was released in the United States on June 18, 2010, the same day as Disney/Pixar's Toy Story 3.

=== Merchandise ===
- Tonner Doll Company, Inc. released in May 2010 Saloon Lilah as a doll.
- NECA has released an assortment of 3 action figures (Hex, Lilah, and Turnbull), and prop replicas from the film.
- WizKids has released a HeroClix Battle Pack consisting of Hex, Lilah, and Turnbull.
- DC Direct has released a Jonah Hex bust, a Lilah bust, and a 1:6 scale Jonah Hex Collector Figure.

=== Home media ===
The film was released on both DVD and Blu-ray on October 12, 2010, with some special features (DVD contains Deleted Scenes). It was then released in the United Kingdom on December 13 the same year, on DVD, Blu-ray and Double Play. Special features include Deleted Scenes, The Inside Story of Jonah Hex and a Picture-In-Picture Commentary.

== Reception ==
=== Box office ===
Jonah Hex failed at the box office, opening at No. 7 during its debut weekend with only $5,379,365 in 2,825 theaters, averaging $1,904 per theater. On its second weekend, the film only managed to gross $1,627,442, falling to No. 10. The film ended its theatrical run on August 12, 2010, having grossed only $10,547,117 in total on a $47 million budget. Due to its negative domestic take, the film was not widely released internationally, grossing less than $500,000 outside the United States.

=== Critical response ===
On Rotten Tomatoes, Jonah Hex has an approval rating of 11% based on 152 reviews and an average rating of 3.6/10. The site's critical consensus reads: "Josh Brolin gives it his best shot, but he can't keep the short, unfocused Jonah Hex from collapsing on the screen". On Metacritic, the film has a score of 33 out of 100 based on 32 critics, indicating "generally unfavorable" reviews. Audiences polled by CinemaScore gave the film an average grade of "C+" on an A+ to F scale.

Keith Phipps of The A.V. Club gave the film a rare "F" rating, criticizing its short runtime and stating "the 81 minutes (including credits) of Jonah Hex footage that made it to the screen look like something assembled under a tight deadline, and possibly under the influence". Roger Ebert gave the film a negative review, saying that the film "is based on some DC Comics characters, which may explain the way the plot jumps around. We hear a lot about graphic novels, but this is more of a graphic anthology of strange occult ideas".

=== Accolades ===
The film was named "Worst Picture" of the year by the Houston Film Critics Society at their 2010 awards ceremony. It was given two nominations at the 31st Golden Raspberry Awards: Worst Actress (Megan Fox) and Worst Screen Couple (Josh Brolin's face and Megan Fox's accent).

== See also ==
- Wild Wild West, a Western with a similar aesthetic
