= Ghost Rider (2007 film) =

Superhero film by Mark Steven Johnson

- Theatrical release poster
- Directed by: Mark Steven Johnson
- Screenplay by: Mark Steven Johnson
- Based on: Ghost Rider by: Roy Thomas; Gary Friedrich; Mike Ploog
- Produced by: Avi Arad; Steven Paul; Michael De Luca; Gary Foster
- Starring: Nicolas Cage; Eva Mendes; Wes Bentley; Sam Elliott; Donal Logue; Peter Fonda
- Cinematography: Russell Boyd
- Edited by: Richard Francis-Bruce
- Music by: Christopher Young
- Production companies: Columbia Pictures; Marvel Entertainment (Note: The company is credited as Marvel Studios, despite not being a part of the Marvel Cinematic Universe. The rights to Ghost Rider would eventually revert to the actual Marvel Studios in 2013.); Crystal Sky Pictures; Relativity Media
- Distributed by: Sony Pictures Releasing
- Release dates: January 15, 2007 (Ukraine); February 16, 2007 (United States)
- Running time: 110 minutes
- Country: United States
- Language: English
- Budget: $110-120 million
- Box office: $229 million

Ghost Rider is a 2007 American superhero film written and directed by Mark Steven Johnson. Based on the Marvel Comics character of the same name, it was produced by Columbia Pictures in association with Marvel Entertainment, Crystal Sky Pictures, and Relativity Media, and distributed by Sony Pictures Releasing. The film stars Nicolas Cage as the titular character, with Eva Mendes, Wes Bentley, Sam Elliott, Donal Logue, Matt Long, and Peter Fonda in supporting roles. Its story follows Johnny Blaze, a motorcycle stuntman who sells his soul and becomes the Ghost Rider, a bounty hunter of evil demons.

Ghost Rider was released on February 16, 2007, in the United States. The film was met with negative reviews from critics and grossed $229 million worldwide against a $110 million budget. Ghost Rider was released on DVD, Blu-ray and UMD on June 12, 2007. A sequel, titled Ghost Rider: Spirit of Vengeance, was released on February 17, 2012, with Cage reprising his role.

== Plot ==
The demon Mephisto sends his bounty hunter, the Ghost Rider, to retrieve the contract of San Venganza for control of a thousand dark souls. Seeing that the agreement would give Mephistopheles the power to bring hell to Earth, the Rider refuses and escapes with it.

In 1986, Mephistopheles reaches out to 17-year-old Johnny Blaze, offering to cure his father's cancer in exchange for Johnny's soul. The next morning, Johnny awakens to discover the cancer cured, but his father dies later from burns sustained in a stunt accident. Johnny accuses Mephistopheles of causing his father's death, but Mephistopheles considers his side of the contract fulfilled and promises to see Johnny again as Mephistopheles takes Johnny's soul.

In the present, Johnny has become a famous motorcycle stuntman. He survives a near-fatal crash after leaping over a field of semi trucks. Later, he runs into his ex-girlfriend, Roxanne, who is now a news reporter, and convinces her to attend a dinner date. Meanwhile, Mephistopheles' son Blackheart comes to Earth and seeks aid from the Hidden (three fallen angels bonded with the elements of air, earth, and water) to find the lost contract of San Venganza.

Mephistopheles makes Johnny the new Ghost Rider and offers to return his soul if he defeats Blackheart. Johnny transforms into Ghost Rider, his flesh burning off his skeleton, and kills the earth angel Gressil. He then uses the Penance Stare, a power that causes mortals to feel all the pain and suffering they caused to others, on a street thug, searing his soul. The next day, he meets a man called the Caretaker, who knows about Ghost Rider's history. He assures Johnny that what happened was real and will happen again, especially at night, when he is near an evil soul.

Johnny leaves to find Roxanne, who is reporting the previous night's events on the news. At home, Johnny tries to control his firepower. Roxanne, upset about being stood up, comes to visit before leaving town, and Johnny reveals himself as the Devil's bounty hunter. Unconvinced, she walks away in disbelief. Due to his license plate being discovered at a crime scene, Johnny winds up in prison for murders Blackheart committed. While in prison, Johnny kills several convicts and the air angel Abigor, and then escapes from the police. He returns to Caretaker, who tells him of his predecessor Carter Slade, a Texas Ranger who hid the contract of San Venganza. At home, Johnny discovers that Blackheart has killed his friend Mack and taken Roxanne hostage, intending to kill her if Johnny does not deliver the contract. Blackheart orders Johnny to retrieve the contract and bring it to him in San Venganza.

Johnny returns to Caretaker, demanding the contract to save Roxanne. Caretaker reveals that it is hidden inside a spade. Before giving it to him, he tells Johnny that he is stronger than his predecessors because he sold his soul for love rather than greed. Caretaker reveals that he is actually Carter Slade and leads Johnny to San Venganza. There, he gives Johnny a lever-action shotgun before bidding him farewell. Having finally shaken off the curse, Slade fades into dust as he rides away.

After killing the water angel Wallow, Johnny gives Blackheart the contract. He transforms into Ghost Rider to subdue Blackheart, but is rendered powerless at sunrise. Using the contract to absorb the thousand souls, Blackheart, now calling himself Legion, attempts to finish Johnny off, but is distracted when Roxanne uses Johnny's shotgun to separate them. Johnny shoots Blackheart with the gun, then uses his Penance Stare to render Blackheart catatonic by burning all the corrupt souls within him. Mephistopheles appears and declares the contract is complete, offering to take back the curse of Ghost Rider. Determined not to let anyone else make another deal, Johnny declines, declaring that he will use his power against the demon and against all harm that comes to the innocent. Infuriated, Mephistopheles vows to make Johnny pay and disappears with Blackheart's body. Johnny rides away on his motorcycle, embracing his new life as Ghost Rider.

== Cast ==
- Nicolas Cage as Johnny Blaze / Ghost Rider:
  A motorcycle stuntman, who is tricked into making a deal with the demon lord Mephisto thinking that it will save his father from dying, and is subsequently bound to an ancient demon, transformed into a supernatural, fiery, skeletal, monstrous soul hunter, the Ghost Rider. As his work for Mephisto continues, he hunts down the demons that have escaped from Hell (a.k.a. Hate or Hades).
  - Matt Long as young Johnny Blaze
- Eva Mendes as Roxanne Simpson: Johnny's childhood love interest and current girlfriend, who is a news reporter.
  - Raquel Alessi as young Roxanne Simpson
- Sam Elliott as Carter Slade (credited as "Caretaker"): A former Texas Ranger from the 19th Century and the first Ghost Rider, or Phantom Rider, and an ally and mentor to Blaze.
  - Elliott provides the narration for the film.
- Wes Bentley as Blackheart / Legion: A demon who is the son of Mephisto, and wants to use the Contract of San Venganza to unleash Hell on Earth.
- Peter Fonda as Mephistopheles "Mephisto":
  The demon lord with whom Blaze makes a contractual deal to save the latter's father from cancer. Deceivingly, Mephisto causes Blaze's father to die the next day in a motorcycling accident. Mephisto is in search of his illegitimate son, Blackheart, who seeks to overthrow him. The two race in search of the Contract of San Venganza, a binding note of 1,000 evil souls.
- Donal Logue as Mack: A member of Johnny's team and his own impresario.

Additional cast members include Brett Cullen as Barton Blaze, Johnny Blaze's deceased father, and former motorcycle stuntman; David Roberts as Captain Jack Dolan, police captain; Laurence Breuls as Gressil, a Fallen Angel with earth-based powers, and one of Blackheart's minions; Daniel Frederiksen as Wallow, a Fallen Angel with water-based powers, and one of Blackheart's minions; Mathew Wilkinson as Abigor, a Fallen Angel with wind-based powers, and one of Blackheart's minions; Rebel Wilson as a goth girl in the alley whom Johnny saved from a mugger; Jessica Napier as a Broken Spoke waitress; Ling-Hsueh Tang as a news reporter; Eddie Baroo as Motorcycle gang member; and Marty Fields as a surveillance guard.

== Production ==
=== Development ===
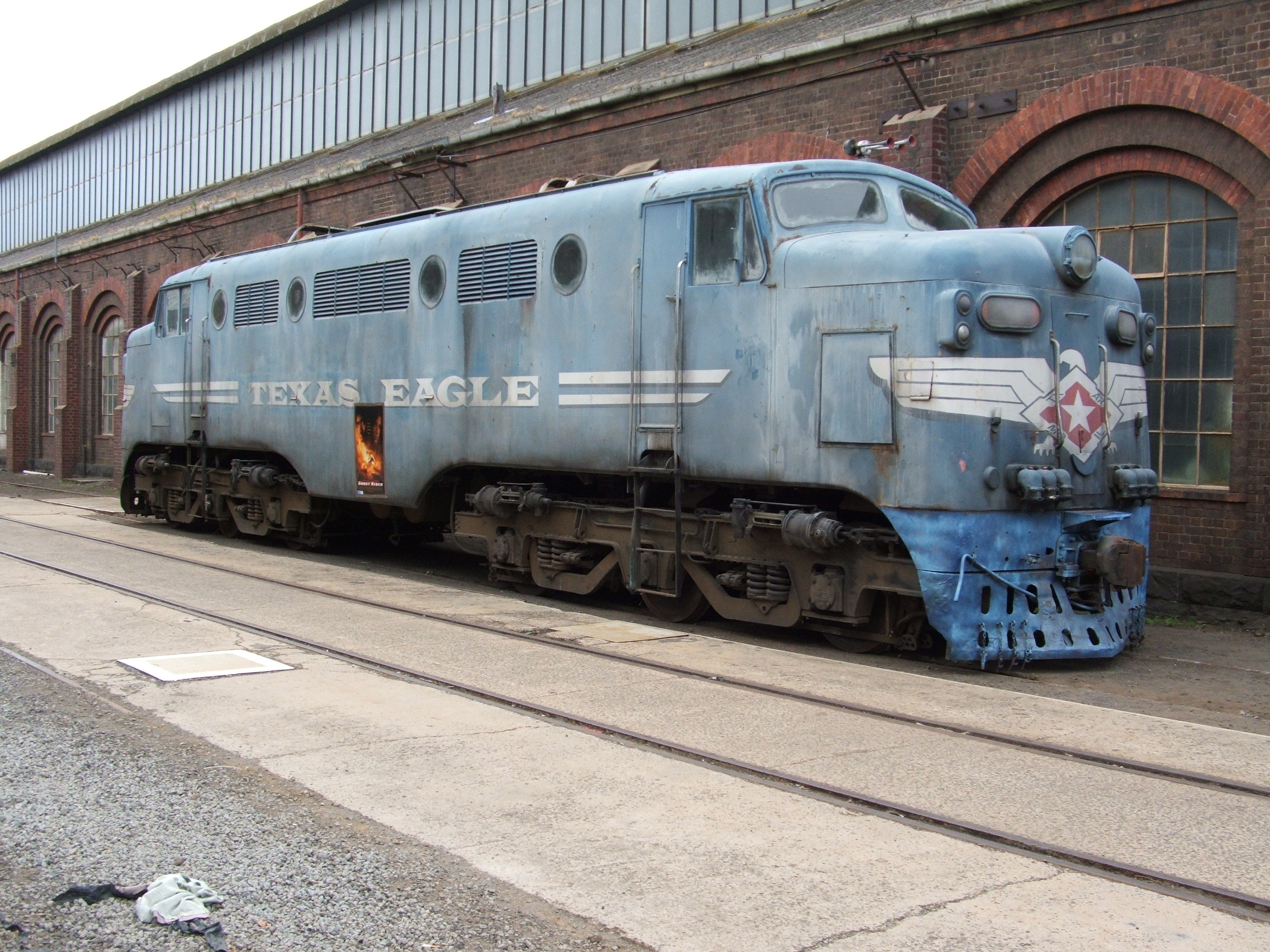
Victorian Railways L class locomotive used in a key scene filmed at Newport Railway Workshops

Marvel began development for Ghost Rider as early as 1992 and was in discussions with potential producers to sell the rights to. In 1997, Gale Anne Hurd was listed as producer, with Jonathan Hensleigh attached to write the script. David S. Goyer developed a script, and in May 2000, Marvel announced an agreement with Crystal Sky Entertainment to film Ghost Rider with actor Jon Voight attached as a producer. Production was scheduled to start in early 2001 with a budget of $75 million and Johnny Depp expressing interest in the lead role. The following August, Dimension Films joined Crystal Sky to co-finance the film, which would be directed by Stephen Norrington. Producer Avi Arad approached Eric Bana on the possibility of playing Ghost Rider, but opted to cast him in Hulk instead. In June 2001, actor and Ghost Rider fan Nicolas Cage entered talks to be cast into the lead role, after having found out about Depp being a possibility for the role and contacted the director to express his own interest. Norrington would drop out within a few months due his commitment to Tick Tock and Cage eventually left the project as well. By May 2002, Columbia Pictures sought to acquire rights to Ghost Rider in turnaround from Dimension Films following their success with Spider-Man. They brought Shane Salerno to rewrite Goyer's script.

=== Pre-production ===
In April 2003, under Columbia Pictures, director Mark Steven Johnson took over the helm for Ghost Rider with Cage returning for the lead role. Johnson, rewriting Salerno's script, was set to begin production of Ghost Rider in late 2003 or early 2004, but it was delayed to October. Cage took a temporary leave of absence to film The Weather Man. Ghost Rider production was slated to tentatively begin in May or June 2004. Despite the previous listed actors, Johnson claimed that Cage was the only actor they considered for the role of Johnny Blaze. Cage said that the film should be Rated R.

Ghost Rider had again been delayed to begin in late 2004, but the lack of a workable script continued to delay production. Johnson revealed that the original draft featured the character Scarecrow as the main villain, but the studio convinced him to change it to Blackheart so that audiences did not confuse him for the DC character of the same name. Actor Wes Bentley was cast as Blackheart, having been introduced to Johnson by Colin Farrell, who had worked with the director in Daredevil. Actress Eva Mendes was also cast opposite Cage as Roxanne Simpson.

=== Filming ===
Ghost Rider commenced filming in Australia at the Melbourne Docklands film studios on February 14, 2005. In March, actor Peter Fonda (who starred in Easy Rider) was cast as the villain Mephistopheles. Johnson originally planned to film before an audience at the Docklands Stadium, but instead opted to create a crowd using computer-generated imagery. The director also chose to film in the motorcycle district of Melbourne. By June 2005, principal photography had been completed for Ghost Rider, which was set for a mid-2006 release.

In April 2006, the cast and crew performed last-minute reshoots in Vancouver.

=== Character portrayal ===
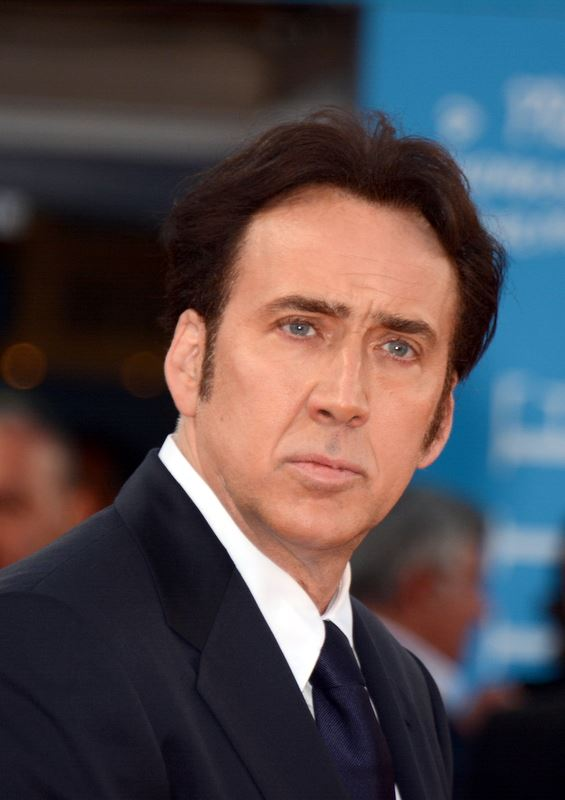
Nicolas Cage portrays the role of Johnny Blaze / Ghost Rider in the film.

Instead of a "hard drinking and smoking bad ass" Johnny Blaze, Nicolas Cage decided to give him more depth: "I'm playing him more as someone who... made this deal, and he's trying to avoid confronting it, anything he can do to keep it away from him". Cage also explained that Blaze's stunt riding was a form of escape and a way to keep him connected to his deceased father, who taught him to ride. Cage rode a Buell motorcycle for Blaze's stunt cycle, and a heavily customized hardtail chopper named "Grace" which transforms into the "Hell Cycle". The Hell Cycle's wheels, made of pure flames in the comics, were changed to be solid tires covered in flames to give the motorcycle more weight onscreen.

The film's visual effects supervisor, Kevin Mack, and the visual effects team at Sony Pictures Imageworks handled the difficult task of creating computer-generated fire on a shot-by-shot basis. Ghost Rider's skull flames were designed to become smaller and blue to display any emotion other than rage. Kevin's Team at Imageworks also created computer-generated motorcycles, chains, water, black goo, dementors, and buildings. To pull off such effects as the living morph where the hardtail chopper ("Grace") comes alive to become the "Hell Cycle", Sony enlisted teams of animators, models, effects artists, lighters & "Flame" artists. The department supervisors for these teams at Imageworks included Kevin Hudson, Brian Steiner, JD Cowels, Marco Marenghi, Joe Spadaro, Joanie Karnowski, Vincent Serritella & Patrick Witting. Patrick's team bore the brunt of the work as they created the fire using a custom pipeline that automated the setup, starting with Maya animated geometry driving Maya Fluids, imported into Houdini, and then rendered & composited on top of the live action plates. Patrick and his team set up the fire process, and much of the front-end automation was set up by Scott Palleiko and Joe Spadaro. The fire was then tweaked and manipulated to look and move believably by Patrick's eleven-man Houdini effects team. All of this was enabled by effects producers Daniel Kuehn and the Digital Effects Supervisor Kee-Suk 'Ken' Hahn.

The digital version of the hell cycle was modeled in detail by Kevin Hudson, and based on the practical prop used in the film, it included animatable skeletal hands that came alive to wrap the gas tank during the supernatural transformation scene. The transformation scene was animated by Max Tyrie and finalized by Joe Spadaro. Each part of the "Grace" geometry had to match up and morph with a piece of geometry on the "Hell Cycle".

Ghost Rider's voice was manipulated by sound designer Dane Davis, who won an Academy Award for Sound Editing for The Matrix. Davis filtered Cage's line readings through three different kinds of animal growls that were played backwards and covered separate frequencies. Davis then amplified the dialogue through a mechanical volumizer. Director Johnson described the sound as a "deep, demonic, mechanical lion's roar".

== Soundtrack ==
Ghost Rider: Original Motion Picture Soundtrack

Film score by Christopher Young
- Released: February 13, 2007
- Recorded: 2006
- Genres: Film score, orchestral
- Length: 56:33
- Label: Varèse Sarabande

Christopher Young chronology
The Grudge 2 (2006)	Ghost Rider: Original Motion Picture Soundtrack (2007)	Spider-Man 3 (2007)

Christopher Young composed Ghost Rider score. In addition, Spiderbait, a band that Johnson befriended during filming in Australia, performed a cover of "Ghost Riders in the Sky" for the end credits.

Track listing

All tracks are written by Christopher Young.

No.	Title	Length
1.	"Ghost Rider"	3:16
2.	"Blackheart Beat"	3:06
3.	"Artistry in Death"	4:13
4.	"A Thing for Karen Carpenter"	2:01
5.	"Cemetery Dance"	5:31
6.	"More Sinister Than Popcorn"	5:40
7.	"No Way to Wisdom"	2:15
8.	"Chain Chariot"	6:18
9.	"Santa Sardonicus"	3:36
10.	"Penance Stare"	5:26
11.	"San Venganza"	3:22
12.	"Blood Signature"	2:08
13.	"Serenade to a Daredevil's Devil"	1:53
14.	"Nebuchadnezzar Phase"	5:52
15.	"The West Was Built on Legends"	3:59
Total length:		56:33

== Marketing ==
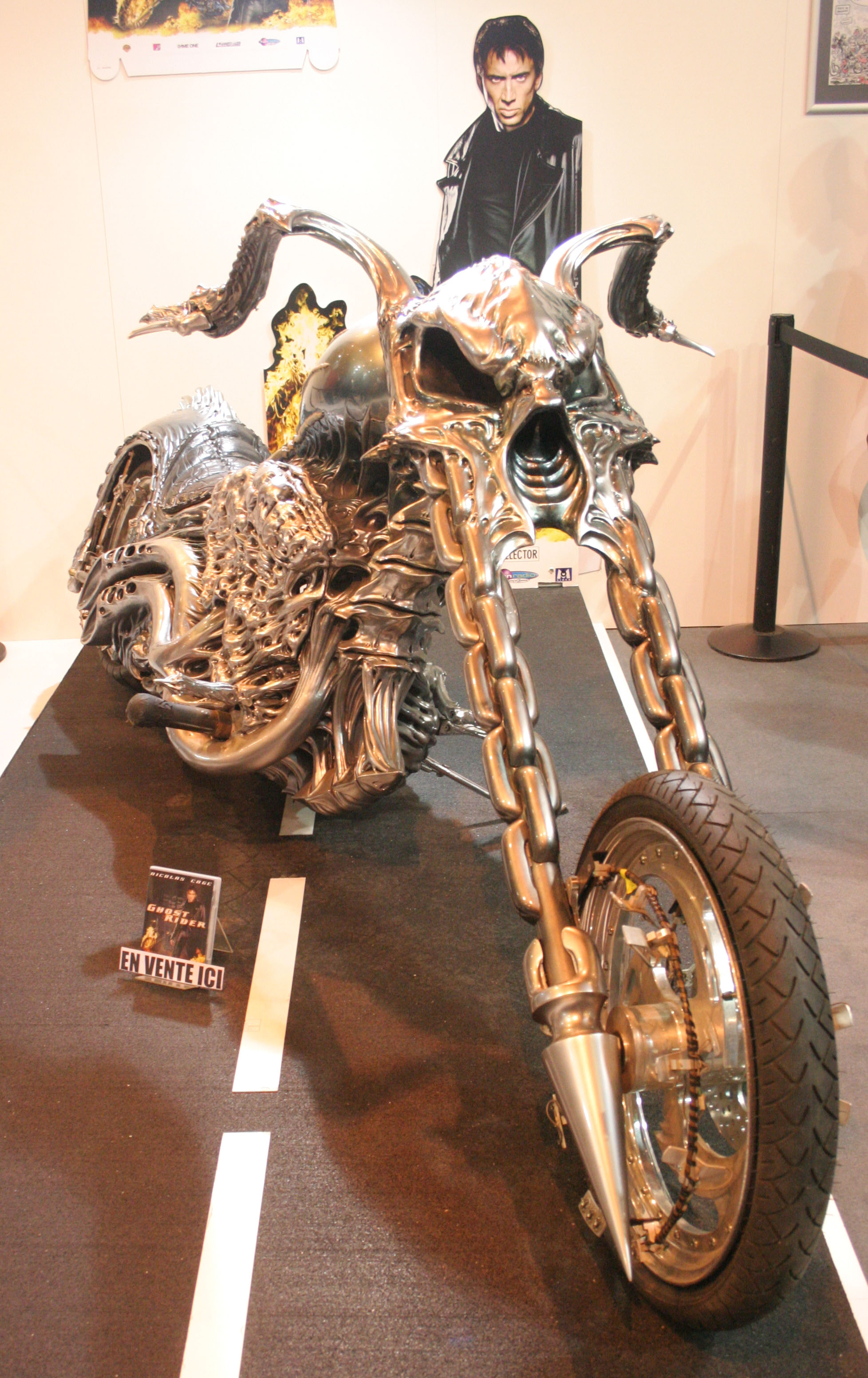
Ghost Rider's Hellcycle, in its supernatural transformed shape, displayed as a part of the film's promotion

In May 2005, Sony Pictures launched the official website for Ghost Rider. The following July, the studio presented a Ghost Rider panel at San Diego Comic-Con and screened a teaser for the audience. The teaser, which did not have finalized footage of the film, eventually leaked online. In the same month, Majesco announced its deal with Marvel to acquire worldwide rights to produce the video game Ghost Rider for the PS2, PSP, and Game Boy Advance consoles. In December, the studio presented a first glimpse of Ghost Rider in a ten-second footage piece on the official site. In April 2006, Sideshow Collectibles announced the sale of a Ghost Rider maquette based on the concept art of the film. The following May, domestic and international teaser trailers for Ghost Rider were launched at Apple Inc. The Ghost Rider was also featured in a commercial for Jackson Hewitt Tax Services in which the character presented his income tax forms to a clerk for processing to receive a quick refund check.

== Release ==
=== Theatrical ===
Ghost Rider was originally scheduled to release on August 4, 2006, but the date was moved three weeks earlier to July 14. Sony changed the film's release date once more to February 16, 2007, to help relieve the studio's crowded 2006 calendar.

=== Home media ===
Sony Pictures Home Entertainment released the film on June 12, 2007, as a single-disc Theatrical Cut DVD, two-disc Extended Cut DVD, Blu-ray Disc, and UMD. Special features on the Extended Cut DVD include two commentary tracks, a comic book history feature, and a making of the film featurette.

== Reception ==
=== Box office ===
Ghost Rider was commercially released in the United States on February 16, 2007. The film grossed $15.4 million on its opening day, while earning $45,388,836 for its opening weekend. The film earned $52 million over the four-day President's Day weekend, with a per-theater average of $14,374 in 3,619 theaters. This made it the highest President's Day opening weekend at the time, surpassing the three-day record held by Daredevil and the four-day record held by 50 First Dates simultaneously. The film would go on to hold these records until 2010 when Valentine's Day took them. It went on to achieve the highest opening weekend for a Nicolas Cage film, replacing National Treasure. Additionally, it reached the number one spot at the box office in its first weekend, beating out Norbit, Bridge to Terabithia, Music and Lyrics, Daddy's Little Girls and Breach. For its second weekend, the film collected $20 million, outgrossing The Number 23 and Reno 911!: Miami to stay in first place. The film's total earnings were $229 million worldwide of which $116 million was from North America.

=== Critical response ===
On the review aggregator website Rotten Tomatoes, 28% of 137 critics' reviews are positive, with an average rating of 4.3/10. The website's consensus reads: "Ghost Rider is a sour mix of morose, glum histrionics amidst jokey puns and hammy dialogue." Metacritic, which uses a weighted average, assigned the film a score of 35 out of 100, based on 20 critics, indicating "generally unfavorable" reviews. Audiences polled by CinemaScore gave it a grade "B".

Michael Ordoña of the Los Angeles Times and Jeannette Catsoulis of the New York Times expressed disappointment in the film. Ordoña said, "For a comic book with a rebel spirit, the adaptation feels obediently conventional", and Catsoulis said Johnny Blaze is "more funny than frightening". In a mixed review, Scott Foundas of LA Weekly explained that "instead of a buoyant, imaginative superhero movie on the order of Sam Raimi's Spider-Man films or Bryan Singer's Superman Returns, we get a lumbering, paint-by-numbers origin story". Robert Koehler of Variety stated that "Ghost Rider would have been most fun had it been made for a dime by a Roger Corman-type outfit as a quickie Gothic adventure spinning Zane Grey, Faust and Evel Knievel".

Eric Alt of the Chicago Tribune praised the computer-generated effects of the film, though he criticized the film overall as a "clumsy, lifeless outing".

=== Accolades ===
The film was nominated for one Razzie Award for Nicolas Cage as Golden Raspberry Award for Worst Actor. The film was also nominated for Best Horror Film at the Saturn Awards.

== Sequel ==
A sequel, entitled Spirit of Vengeance, was released on February 17, 2012. Cage reprised his role as Johnny Blaze and also portrayed Johnny Blaze in his Ghost Rider form. Crank filmmakers Mark Neveldine and Brian Taylor directed the film. The film received worse reviews than its predecessor, but was still a financial success.

When asked about a potential third film, Cage said that it could happen, but without his involvement. In 2013 the rights reverted to Marvel Studios, effectively cancelling plans for a third film. The Robbie Reyes version of the Ghost Rider later appeared in the TV series Agents of S.H.I.E.L.D., set in the Marvel Cinematic Universe. Another incarnation of the Johnny Blaze version of Ghost Rider will appear in a self-titled film in the Marvel Cinematic Universe portayed by Ryan Gosling.
