= Yeva-Genevieve Lavlinski =

Russian actress (born 1977)

- Born: Ukrainian SSR, Soviet Union (now Ukraine)
- Occupations: Actress, film director

Yeva-Genevieve Lavlinski is an actress and film director from the Soviet Union currently living in Los Angeles, California. Lavlinski is a law school graduate from Ukraine and a screenwriter with screenplays registered with the Writers Guild. She paints and her work is on display at Bergamot Station in California. She has acted and directed films in the United States. She has worked alongside actor Jason Statham, actress Amy Smart and actor/singer Dwight Yoakam in the film Crank: High Voltage. She directed and produced Sand Snowman, about the dissolution of the Soviet Union and the beginning of the a new Russia.
