= Mark Neveldine and Brian Taylor =

American filmmaking duo

- Born: Mark Neveldine; May 11, 1973 (age 53); Watertown, New York, United States Brian Taylor; United States
- Other names: Neveldine/Taylor; Neveldine & Taylor
- Occupations: Film directors, producers screenwriters, cinematographers, camera operators
- Years active: 2006–2011 (as a duo)

Mark Neveldine and Brian Taylor are two American filmmakers who formerly collaborated as a filmmaking duo. They are sometimes referred to as Neveldine & Taylor or Neveldine/Taylor. Their written and directed productions are known for being dark, edgy, bizarre, and over-the-top, while maintaining a small budget. Both Neveldine and Taylor have written and directed several films together that include Crank and its sequel, Crank: High Voltage.

== Films ==
Mark Neveldine and Brian Taylor made their feature film debut with Crank, a 2006 film starring Jason Statham. The duo later wrote and produced the 2008 thriller Pathology. In 2009, Neveldine and Taylor wrote and directed Crank: High Voltage, a sequel to Crank, and Gamer, a science fiction action thriller starring Gerard Butler. The duo were originally slated to direct the film adaptation of DC Comics's Jonah Hex, but stepped down due to creative differences with film distributor Warner Bros. They are still credited as screenwriters for the film. The duo directed Ghost Rider: Spirit of Vengeance (2011), the sequel to Ghost Rider.

=== Cinematography ===
Neveldine and Taylor frequently serve as camera operators for their films, and are known for having their films shot entirely in high-definition video. As camera operators, the duo are known for their "roller dolly" technique, which involves the camera shooting the film while on rollerblades. Taylor commented on this technique while filming Crank: "The Rollercam footage was really the most dramatic and technically challenging of the movie. Mark absolutely could not be tethered or restricted by any cables when blading at speeds up to 30mph..."

For Crank: High Voltage, the duo used consumer-grade camcorders, such as the Canon HF10 and the Canon XH-A1. Neveldine commented on the use of these cameras: "We can put these cameras in places that people haven’t and we can put 10 of them in places where people haven't...And one of the things it allows us to do is we're doing this moving bullet time camera rig where we take 8 HF-10s and we put it on a light weight piece of speed rail and I can roller blade and skate around Jason Statham as he’s blasting down the street with a weapon and capture just rad images." During the filming of Crank: High Voltage, Neveldine and Taylor shot over 279 hours of footage during its 31 days of production.

Neveldine and Taylor's third directorial effort, Gamer was the second feature film (following Che) to be shot with special hand-held Red One digital cameras.

== Filmography ==
| Year | Title | Directors | Writers | Producers | Camera Operators |
|---|---|---|---|---|---|
| 2006 | Crank | Yes | Yes | Executive | Yes |
| 2008 | Pathology | No | Yes | Yes | No |
| 2009 | Crank: High Voltage | Yes | Yes | Executive | Yes |
| 2009 | Gamer | Yes | Yes | Executive | Yes |
| 2010 | Jonah Hex | No | Yes | No | No |
| 2011 | Ghost Rider: Spirit of Vengeance | Yes | No | No | Yes |
