= Brian Taylor (filmmaker) =

American filmmaker

- Other name: Taylor
- Occupations: Film director, screenwriter, film producer, camera operator
- Years active: 2002–present

Brian Taylor is an American filmmaker. He is best known for collaborating with Mark Neveldine in the writing and directing team Neveldine/Taylor.

== Career ==
Taylor attended the Los Angeles Film School in Hollywood and began his career as a cinematographer, working on independent films and low-budget shorts. In the early 2000s, Taylor united with Mark Neveldine to form the directing team Neveldine/Taylor. Known for their aggressive, high energy camerawork, the team signed with @radical.media in 2004 as commercial directors. They shot campaigns for Nike, Powerade, Budweiser and many others before moving to the big screen in 2006 with their first feature, Crank.

According to Taylor, the high adrenaline Crank was written as "an attack on studio filmmaking." The film spawned a sequel, Crank: High Voltage (2009) that Quentin Tarantino called "The Gremlins 2 of action movies". The team pioneered the RED ONE camera on the dystopian science fiction mashup Gamer (2009), then trekked across Europe with Nicolas Cage on Ghost Rider: Spirit of Vengeance (2011).

In February 2012, Taylor signed a seven-figure deal with Sony Pictures to write and direct a film adaptation of the Twisted Metal video game series. In September 2017, Brian Taylor confirmed that Sony had passed on the Twisted Metal film, feeling the series fanbase did not warrant the higher budget it would have cost to realize it.

In 2016, Taylor teamed up with Grant Morrison to adapt the graphic novel Happy! for Original Films. The series premiered on SyFy in 2017. Brian and Grant went on to adapt Aldous Huxley's Brave New World with Amblin/UCP as a USA series in 2018.

In 2017, Taylor wrote and directed the horror comedy film Mom and Dad starring Nicolas Cage, Selma Blair and Anne Winters. The film premiered at Toronto International Film Festival 2017 as part of the Midnight Madness lineup and was released in theaters on January 19, 2018. In 2024, Taylor directed the live-action reboot Hellboy: The Crooked Man.

== Filmography ==
=== With Mark Neveldine ===
Year	Title	Director	Writer	Producer	Camera Operator
2006	Crank	Yes	Yes	Executive	Yes
2008	Pathology	No	Yes	Yes	Yes
2009	Crank: High Voltage	Yes	Yes	Executive	Yes
2009	Gamer	Yes	Yes	Executive	Yes
2010	Jonah Hex	No	Yes	No	No
2011	Ghost Rider: Spirit of Vengeance	Yes	No	No	Yes

=== Solo works ===
Year	Title	Director	Writer	Producer	Notes
2003	Biker Boyz	No	No	No	Visual effects artist
2009	Kid Revolver	No	No	Executive	Short film
2017–2019	Happy!	Yes	Yes	Executive	Directed 9 episodes, Wrote 5 episodes
2017	Mom and Dad	Yes	Yes	Yes	
2020	Brave New World	No	Yes	Executive	Episode: "Pilot"
2024	Hellboy: The Crooked Man	Yes	Yes	No	
