= Ghost Rider: Spirit of Vengeance =

2011 film by Mark Neveldine and Brian Taylor

- Theatrical release poster
- Directed by: Neveldine/Taylor
- Screenplay by: Scott M. Gimple; Seth Hoffman; David S. Goyer
- Story by: David S. Goyer
- Based on: Johnny Blaze by: Roy Thomas; Gary Friedrich; Mike Ploog
- Produced by: Steven Paul; Ashok Amritraj; Michael De Luca; Avi Arad; Ari Arad
- Starring: Nicolas Cage; Ciarán Hinds; Violante Placido; Johnny Whitworth; Christopher Lambert; Idris Elba
- Cinematography: Brandon Trost
- Edited by: Brian Berdan
- Music by: David Sardy
- Production companies: Marvel Entertainment; Crystal Sky Pictures; Hyde Park Entertainment; Imagenation Abu Dhabi
- Distributed by: Sony Pictures Releasing
- Release dates: December 11, 2011 (Butt-Numb-A-Thon); February 17, 2012 (United States)
- Running time: 95 minutes
- Country: United States
- Language: English
- Budget: $57 million
- Box office: $132.6 – 149.3 million

Ghost Rider: Spirit of Vengeance is a 2011 American superhero film based on the Marvel Comics antihero Ghost Rider. It is a sequel to the 2007 film Ghost Rider and features Nicolas Cage reprising his role as Johnny Blaze / Ghost Rider with supporting roles portrayed by Ciarán Hinds, Violante Placido, Johnny Whitworth, Christopher Lambert, and Idris Elba. The film was directed by Mark Neveldine and Brian Taylor, from a screenplay written by Scott M. Gimple, Seth Hoffman, and David S. Goyer. Released publicly for one night on December 11, 2011, Ghost Rider: Spirit of Vengeance had its wide commercial release on February 17, 2012, in 2D and 3D. Johnny Blaze is the Ghost Rider cursed to hunt demons, and he is approached by a secret religious sect to help protect a young boy named Danny, who is believed to be a target of the devil's minions.

The film experienced worse critical reception than the first film, with criticism being aimed towards the script, CGI, and performances. The film grossed $132.6 – 149.2 million, against its $57 million production budget.

Nicolas Cage stated that he was "done" with the Ghost Rider films and a planned sequel was canceled. The film rights to the character reverted to Marvel Studios in 2013, and the Robbie Reyes version of Ghost Rider appeared in the television series Agents of S.H.I.E.L.D.. A reboot film starring Ryan Gosling is scheduled for release in 2028.

== Plot ==
In rural Eastern Europe, Moreau, an alcoholic monk, warns a nearby monastery about Roarke's forces seeking to kidnap a young boy named Danny. They aim to perform a ritual that transfers the aging Roarke's mind into Danny's body. A firefight ensues, and Danny escapes with his mother Nadya.

Moreau seeks out Johnny Blaze, who is in hiding to contain the Rider inside him. In exchange for the Rider's help finding Danny, Moreau offers to restore Johnny's soul and remove the Ghost Rider's curse.

Nadya and Danny are captured by Nadya's former boyfriend, Ray Carrigan. He is about to execute Nadya when the Ghost Rider appears, killing several of Carrigan's men. Nadya distracts the Ghost Rider, who is shot with grenades. Nadya escapes but Danny is captured. Carrigan informs Roarke (who is actually Mephisto in disguise) about the Rider's interference and Roarke places a spell on Danny to stop the Rider from tracking him. Meanwhile, Blaze awakens in a hospital and leaves, following Nadya and convincing her to accept his help. Nadya reveals that Danny is Roarke's son.

That night, after interrogating Carrigan's contact, Johnny takes off to find Carrigan. The Rider emerges and takes on Carrigan's men, using an empowered mining machine to destroy their hideout and mortally wound Carrigan. The Rider turns on Nadya and attempts to use the Penance Stare on her, but Danny is able to stop him. Roarke finds Carrigan nearly dead and revives him, granting him the ability to decay anything he touches.

Johnny and Nadya bring Danny to the monastery, where Moreau explains that the Ghost Rider is an angel named Zarathos who was tortured and driven insane in Hell. Moreau tells Johnny that he can exorcise the spirit if Johnny tells a secret only he knows. Johnny confesses that his deal with Roarke was selfish: His father had accepted his cancer and was ready to die, but Johnny could not accept it. Moreau exorcises the spirit, and Johnny becomes human again. The head monk Methodius tries to kill Danny, but Carrigan kills the monks and recaptures Danny.

The ritual to transfer Roarke into Danny's body begins while Johnny, Nadya, and Moreau infiltrate the ceremony. Carrigan kills Moreau while Danny returns the Ghost Rider to Johnny. Danny grants the Rider the ability to stay in Rider form even in broad daylight; the Rider then pursues Roarke. The Rider kills Carrigan and flips the car that Roarke and Danny are in before using his chain to hurl Roarke back to Hell. With Roarke defeated, Zarathos regains his sanity and is restored to his previous incarnation as the Spirit of Justice. Channeling the blue flame of Zarathos, Johnny revives Danny. As Johnny is seen riding away in Rider form, the flames on his bike and body are now blue.

== Cast ==
- Nicolas Cage as Johnny Blaze / Ghost Rider:
  A motorcycle stuntman who sold his soul to the demon lord to save his father from cancer and became the demon lord's servant called the Spirit of Vengeance, a fiery spirit that feeds on the evil of its victims.
  - Ionut Cristian Lefter as Young Johnny Blaze. Matt Long, who portrayed the character in the first film, was originally set to reprise the role but was eventually replaced by Lefter.
- Fergus Riordan as Danny Ketch: A young child caught up in a monstrous conspiracy who ends up in the care of Johnny Blaze during his travels.
- Ciarán Hinds as Mephistopheles "Mephisto" / Roarke:
  The demon lord who transformed Johnny Blaze into the Ghost Rider. Mephisto has fathered a child named Danny and has plans for the boy. Peter Fonda, who portrayed the character in the first film, had previously expressed interest in reprising the role.
- Violante Placido as Nadya Ketch: Danny's mother and Ray's ex-girlfriend who helps Johnny to stop Mephisto from taking over Danny's body.
- Idris Elba as Moreau: A French member of a secret religious organization who joins forces with Johnny. He is the one who tells Johnny to find Danny. Moreau is an original character, not based on an existing comic character.
- Christopher Lambert as Methodius: A monk.
- Johnny Whitworth as Ray Carrigan / Blackout:
  A mercenary, drug dealer, and gun runner turned into Blackout by the demon lord to complete his job. This transformation gives him the fortitude and supernatural abilities to compete with Ghost Rider. Carrigan's powers are completely unlike those of the comic book character; writers admitted that the only aspect of Blackout they used in designing the movie version was his appearance.

Additional cast include Anthony Head as Benedict, a senior monk at the castle where Nadya and Danny are hiding at the start of the film; Jacek Koman as Terrokov; Vincent Regan as Toma Nikasevic, an arms dealer who works with Carrigan, and Spencer Wilding as Grannik.

== Production ==
This story picks up eight years after the first film. You don't have to have seen the first film. It doesn't contradict anything that happened in the first film, but we're pretending that our audience hasn't seen the first film. It's as if you took that same character where things ended in the first film and then picked it up eight years later—he's just in a much darker, existential place.

— David S. Goyer about the relationship between the two Ghost Rider films.

=== Development ===
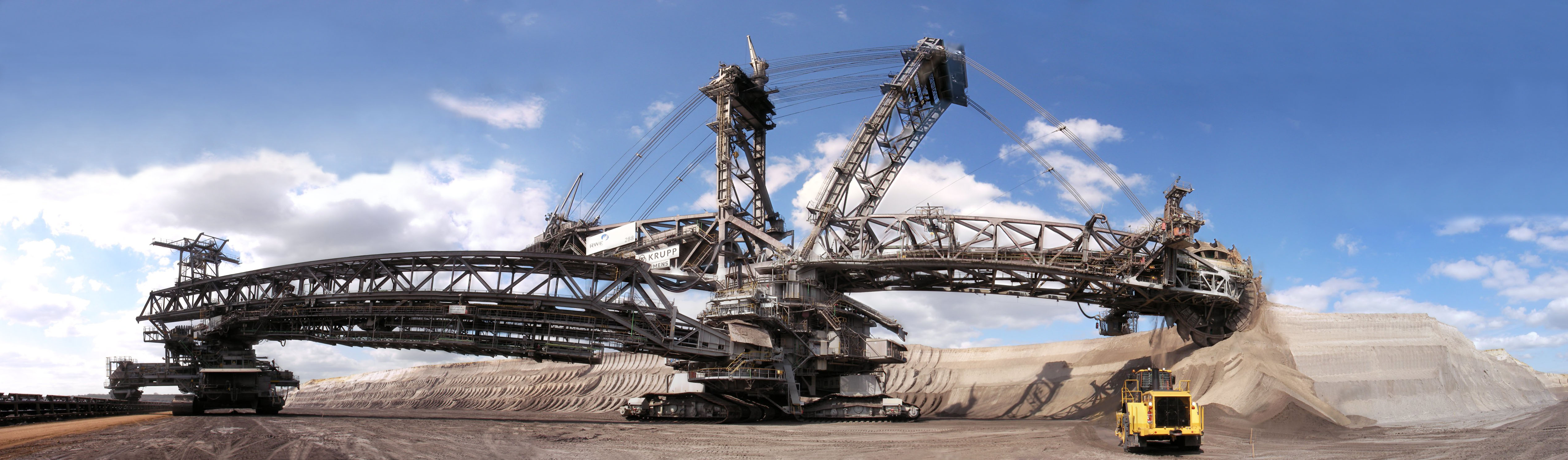
A special prop: The Bagger 288, the heaviest land vehicle in the world from 1978 to 1995

Marvel producer Avi Arad announced the development of Ghost Rider 2 at a press event in February 2007. Peter Fonda had also expressed a desire to return as Mephistopheles. In early December, Nicolas Cage also expressed interest to return in the lead role as Ghost Rider. Shortly after, in another interview he went on further to mention that he would enjoy seeing a darker story and suggested that the film could do with newly created villains. It was also rumored that the sequel would feature Danny Ketch, another Marvel character who took up the Ghost Rider mantle in the comics. In a September 2008 interview, Cage informed IGN that Columbia had taken meetings to start a sequel. Cage noted conversations about the story, where Ghost Rider may end up in Europe on behalf of the church, having story elements "very much in the zeitgeist, like Da Vinci Code". In February 2009, an online source stated Columbia Pictures had greenlit a sequel to Ghost Rider. Nicolas Cage was stated to reprise the lead role, while the studio were in search of writers. David S. Goyer signed on to write the script for the sequel. Goyer spoke to MTV about the sequel, stating that the story would pick up eight years after the events of the first film and that he hopes to start filming by 2010. The budget for "Spirit of Vengeance" was considerably lower than the first film; it cost an estimated $57 million to make, compared to the original film's $110 million price tag.

=== Casting ===
Nicolas Cage returned to his role, and Mark Neveldine and Brian Taylor were confirmed to direct the film, with editor Brian Berdan and cinematographer Brandon Trost reuniting with the directors from the Crank films. For his role, Cage painted his face black and white and wore black contact lenses on his eyes and sewed bits of Ancient Egyptian artifacts to his leather jacket to channel the spirit of vengeance. Taylor said this version of Ghost Rider was darker than the first film, and will be based on the miniseries Ghost Rider: Road to Damnation by Garth Ennis and Clayton Crain. Christopher Lambert underwent three months of sword training and shaved his head for his role. Johnny Whitworth was cast as the villain Blackout.

=== Filming ===
Cage revealed shooting was to start in November. Eva Mendes did not return as Roxanne for the sequel. The film was shot in Romania and Turkey. The film started principal photography in Sibiu, Romania in November 2010, using mostly local talent. Principal photography was completed on January 24, 2011. The film was shot in 2D and converted in post-production to 3D.

Three scenes were shot on set Castel Film Romania. Among the places in the country chosen were Transfăgărăşan, Targu-Jiu, Hunedoara Castle and Bucharest.

Filming in Turkey took place in Cappadocia, a historical region in central Turkey with an exotic chimney-topped rocky setting. The scene with the Greco-Roman theatre was filmed in Pamukkale, where the ancient Greek (of the Seleucid Empire) city of Hierapolis once stood. The motorcycle used by Cage was a Yamaha VMAX.

== Marketing ==
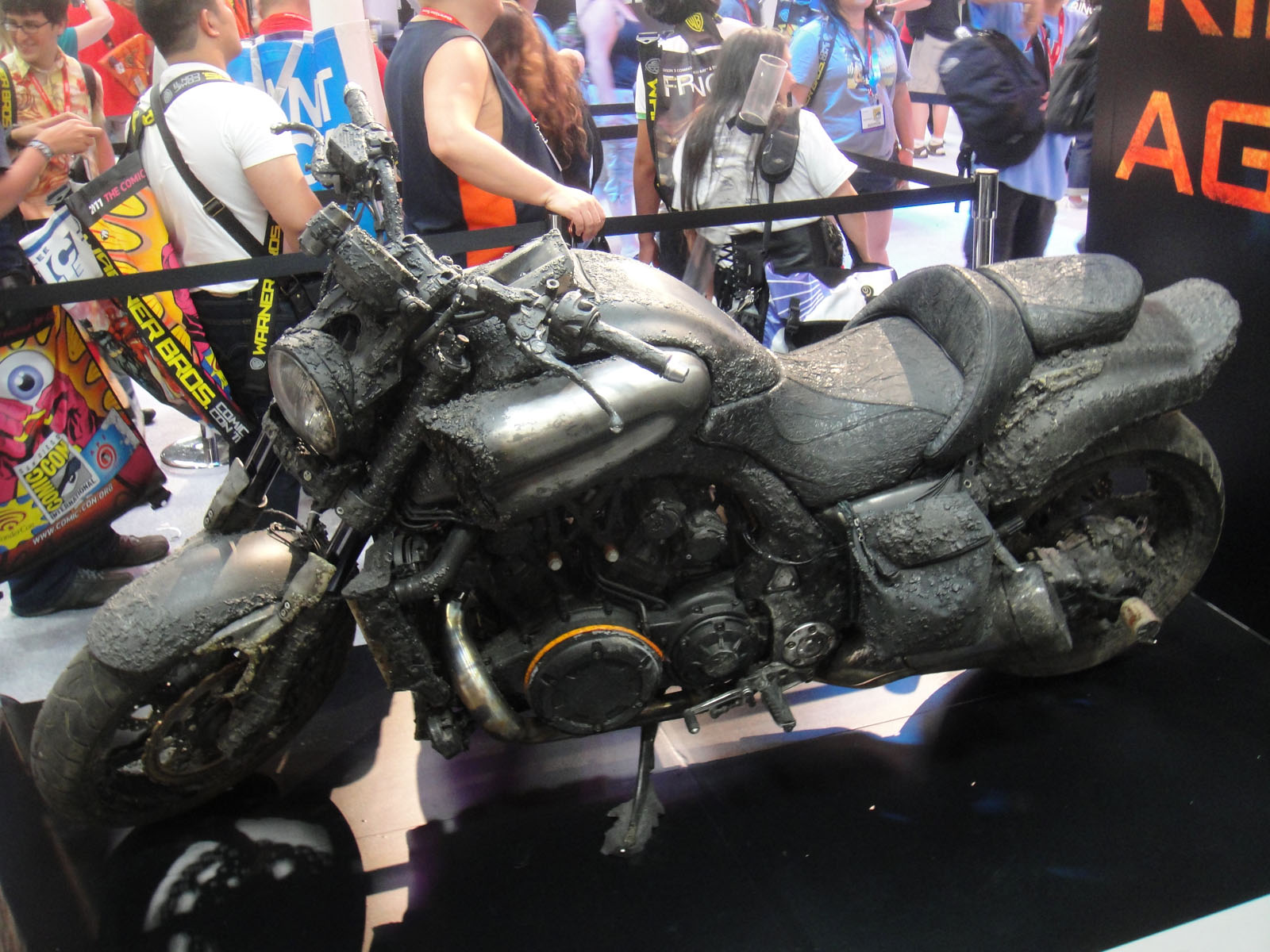
Yamaha VMax's supernatural transformed Hellcycle displayed at the 2011 San Diego Comic-con

The producers employed a mix of targeted traditional advertising and television appearances, as well as aggressive social media marketing. Sony teamed up with West Coast Marketing and launched the face of the fan competition, where artists were challenged to design an alternate poster for the film. The contest was won by New York digital media artist Justin Paul. The directing team of Mark Neveldine and Brian Taylor were known for the Crank films, already popular with the young male demographic, and further fuelled early interest in the film with a presentation at the 2010 San Diego Comic-con. The executive pointed out that the marketing campaign has used star Nicolas Cage sparingly in American TV commercials. Cage appeared on Saturday Night Live and heavily promoted the film in Europe but he plays a secondary role to the film's effects and imagery, which one executive said made the marketing campaign seem more like it was for a video game.

== Reception ==
=== Box office ===
The film premiered in the United States on February 17, 2012, in both 2D and 3D formats. It opened in 3,174 theaters at No. 3, with North American box office receipts of $22.1 million, behind Safe House, which moved to No. 1 on its second weekend. The Vow, the holdover from the previous week, made less than half of Ghost Rider's opening weekend of $45.4 million. It went on to gross $51.8 million at the U.S. box office and $80.8 – 97.4 million internationally, for a worldwide total of $132.6 – 149.2 million.

=== Critical response ===
On Rotten Tomatoes, Ghost Rider: Spirit of Vengeance has an approval rating of 18%, based on 118 reviews, with an average rating of 4/10. The website's consensus reads: "With a weak script, uneven CG work, and a Nic Cage performance so predictably loony it's no longer amusing, Ghost Rider: Spirit of Vengeance aims to be trashy fun but ends up as plain trash". On Metacritic, the film has a weighted average score of 34 out of 100, based on 22 critics, indicating "generally unfavorable" reviews. Audiences polled by Cinemascore gave the film a "C+" rating on a scale from A to F, lower than the first film's "B".

Reviewers who viewed an early preview screening at the December 2011 Butt-Numb-A-Thon in Austin expressed negative reactions to the film. Two attendees said it was worse than the first Ghost Rider film, and one said that the sequel makes the first film "look like The Dark Knight" by comparison.

IGN reviewer Scott Collura gave the movie four out of five stars, saying it "is a movie you'll either love or hate". He commends the film for bringing the cartoonish insanity of the Crank movies to the insane concept of Ghost Rider. Andrew Barker of Variety called it a marginal improvement on the first film but said "the picture is still much too rickety, slapdash and surprisingly dull to qualify as a good barrel-bottom pleasure." Ben Sachs of the Chicago Reader notes that this is the first time directors Neveldine and Taylor have directed a script they didn't write, "and the superhero plot often seems to hamper their imaginations" but says the film "doesn't lack for crazy charm", praising Cage and Hinds for their admittedly weird performances.

Marc Savlov from The Austin Chronicle awarded the film 1.5 out of 5 stars, writing: "Cage appears to find his role as this second-tier Marvel Comics antihero alternately silly, tremendously fun, and the means to a decent paycheck for not all that much work." Savlov also criticized the film's use of 3D as being "a few shots of flaming motorcycle parts comin' at ya, but little else." Nathan Rabin of The A.V. Club welcomed Idris Elba's role as the alcoholic priest Moreau but criticized the film for "squandering even more potential" and that it fails to achieve the "go-for-broke energy of superior trash." Peter Travers of Rolling Stone called the film "a dreadful mess", and "a dishwater dull sequel to the hellishly bad 2007 original", and said he'd never seen worse 3D.

=== Accolades ===
Ghost Rider: Spirit of Vengeance was nominated for two Golden Raspberry Awards: Worst Actor (Nicolas Cage; also, for Seeking Justice) and Worst Remake, Rip-off or Sequel.

== Home media ==
Ghost Rider: Spirit of Vengeance was released by Sony Pictures Home Entertainment on home media formats—including DVD, VOD, Blu-ray, and Blu-ray 3D—on June 12, 2012. It earned $18 million in home media sales. Special features included a directors’ expanded video commentary and a five-part documentary titled The Path to Vengeance: Making Ghost Rider 2, which covered pre-production, production, post-production, and release phases.

== Franchise ==
=== Canceled sequel ===
Shortly after the film's release, directors Mark Neveldine and Brian Taylor discussed producing a potential third Ghost Rider film and having someone else direct it. Neveldine said that Cage had expressed interest in appearing in another Ghost Rider film, hinting that the film could move forward provided that Spirit of Vengeance was a success: "I know Nic wants to do it, he's very pumped about it ... We'll just have to see how well [this] does." When Cage was asked about a possible third installment, he said that it could happen, but without his involvement, later officially clarifying that he was done with his role and expressed interest to see a female Ghost Rider in the film.

=== Marvel Cinematic Universe ===
The film rights to the Ghost Rider character reverted to Marvel Studios in 2013, though there were no plans to make another Ghost Rider film at that time. In 2016, the Robbie Reyes incarnation of the character appeared in the Marvel Cinematic Universe through the fourth season of the television series Agents of S.H.I.E.L.D., where he is portrayed by Gabriel Luna. A television series based on Robbie Reyes's incarnation of Ghost Rider was announced to premiere on Hulu in 2020, but the series did not go forward.

In July 2026, Marvel Studios announced a Ghost Rider film with Ryan Gosling starring as Johnny Blaze, Shawn Levy as director, and Jonathan Tropper as screenwriter; all three had previously collaborated on the film Star Wars: Starfighter (2027). The film is scheduled to be released on July 28, 2028.
