= Skip Williamson (producer) =

American film producer

- Born: Skip Albert Williamson; September 5, 1964 (age 62); Midland, Texas, U.S.
- Occupations: Entrepreneur, producer

Skip Williamson is an American Grammy-nominated music producer, feature film producer, and publisher. After establishing the independent label, Will Records, he partnered with Lakeshore Entertainment to form Lakeshore Records. Williamson is also a co-publisher and Chief Creative Officer of Revolver.

== Career ==
Before entering the entertainment industry, Williamson served as a strategist on Wall Street, constructing corporate prospectuses for mergers and acquisitions.

In 1994, under the moniker Will Records, Williamson started producing underground albums out of his garage, including early work by Grandaddy, AK1200, and Candiria. He produced numerous albums for films, earning a pair of Grammy nominations for Best Compilation Soundtrack Album for Motion Picture, Television or Other Visual Media on Napoleon Dynamite (2005) and Little Miss Sunshine (2006).

During his 13-year tenure as partner at Lakeshore Entertainment, Williamson also produced several films, including the Underworld franchise (2003-2016), Crank (2006) and Gamer (2009), and Million Dollar Baby.
