= Crank (film) =

2006 American action film

- Theatrical release poster
- Directed by: Mark Neveldine; Brian Taylor
- Written by: Mark Neveldine; Brian Taylor
- Produced by: Michael Davis; Gary Lucchesi; Tom Rosenberg; Skip Williamson; Richard S. Wright
- Starring: Jason Statham; Amy Smart; Jose Pablo Cantillo; Efren Ramirez; Dwight Yoakam
- Cinematography: Adam Biddle
- Edited by: Brian Berdan
- Music by: Paul Haslinger
- Production companies: Lakeshore Entertainment; RadicalMedia
- Distributed by: Lionsgate
- Release date: September 1, 2006
- Running time: 87 minutes
- Country: United States
- Language: English
- Budget: $12 million
- Box office: $42.9 million

Crank is a 2006 American action thriller film written and directed by Mark Neveldine and Brian Taylor (in their directorial debut). It stars Jason Statham, Amy Smart, Jose Pablo Cantillo, Efren Ramirez and Dwight Yoakam. In the film, Chev Chelios (Statham), an LA–based American assassin, is poisoned by a synthetic drug and must keep his adrenaline flowing constantly to keep himself alive, while trying to track down the culprits responsible for poisoning him. It was followed by 2009 sequel; Crank: High Voltage.

== Plot ==
L.A.–based Englishman Chev Chelios works as a hitman under Don "Carlito" Carlos's crime empire. Chelios is contracted by Carlito to kill Don Kim, a mafia boss, because members of the Triads have been encroaching on Carlito's business. Ricky Verona, an ambitious small-time criminal, uses the opportunity to conspire with Carlito: Verona will kill Chelios so the Triads won't retaliate, then take Chelios's place as Carlito's newly hired gun.

Verona and his brother Alex break into Chelios' apartment, knock him out, and inject him with a Chinese synthetic drug, dubbed the Beijing Cocktail, which inhibits the flow of adrenaline, slowing the heart and eventually killing the victim. Chelios discovers what's been done and calls Doc Miles, a mafia surgeon. Miles informs him that to survive he must keep his adrenaline pumping and is unsure if the antidote exists.

Chelios keeps up his adrenaline through risky acts that elicit intense emotions, including picking fights with gangsters and police, reckless driving, taking illegal drugs, and having public sex with his girlfriend Eve. Chelios visits Carlito for help; Carlito says there is no antidote and he and Verona are using Chelios as the scapegoat for the Triads.

An angered Chelios leaves to find Verona. Through his street-smart informant, a crossdresser named Kaylo, Chelios finds Alex and kills him, informing Verona of his brother's death. Chelios then heads to the hospital to acquire epinephrine in order to keep his adrenaline afloat. Ricky sends goons to kidnap Eve as revenge, but Chelios reaches her first and reveals his true profession, admitting that he'd wanted to retire for her. Kaylo, kidnapped by Carlito's men, is forced to call Chelios and tell him that Verona is at a warehouse.

Chelios goes there to discover it's a Korean sweatshop. He finds Kaylo's corpse; the thugs reveal that Carlito ordered them to kill Chelios. After a shootout with Carlito's henchmen, Chelios and Eve escape and go to Miles's place, where Miles explains that he cannot cure Chelios. Knowing that he will die soon, Chelios decides to take revenge on Verona and arranges a meeting with him at a downtown hotel rooftop.

There, Carlito takes out a syringe, filled with the same poison, and is about to kill Chelios, but Don Kim, who is alive because Chelios spared him, arrives with his Triads to help, and a shootout follows. Carlito tries to escape with his helicopter; before Chelios can kill him, Verona injects Chelios with the syringe.

Carlito is betrayed by Verona, who kills him and tries to escape with the helicopter. Chelios manages to board the helicopter and pull Verona out. Mid-air, he snaps Verona's neck, killing him. While falling, Chelios calls Eve on his cell phone to apologize for not coming back. He lands in the middle of an intersection, but survives the fall. (Note: As depicted in Crank: High Voltage (2009))

== Cast ==
- Jason Statham as Chev Chelios, an English hitman and adrenaline junkie in LA
- Amy Smart as Eve Lydon, Chev's girlfriend
- Jose Pablo Cantillo as Ricky Verona, a sadistic gangster who poisoned Chelios and plots to take his place
- Carlos Sanz as Carlito, Chev's boss who is in league with Verona
- Dwight Yoakam as Doc Miles, Chev's physician who is a sex-crazed mob doctor
- Efren Ramirez as Kaylo, Chev's street-smart crossdressing informant
- Keone Young as Don Kim, a Triad boss who Chev was supposed to assassinate
- Reno Wilson as Orlando, a biker and drug dealer connected to Chelios
- Edi Gathegi as Haitian Cabbie
- Sam Witwer as Henchman
- Jay Xcala as Alex Verona, Ricky's older brother
- Chester Bennington as Pharmacy stoner (cameo)
- Glenn Howerton as Doctor
- Valarie Rae Miller as Chocolate
- Noel Gugliemi as Warehouse Rooftop Hood

== Production ==
The film was written in 2003 with Johnny Knoxville in mind for the lead role, but Jason Statham came on board. Rather than being shot on 35mm film like most films at the time, the filmmakers of Crank opted to shoot on digital videotape, using Canon XL2 and Sony CineAlta HDC-F950 cameras.

The film was shot on location in Los Angeles. Co-directors Mark Neveldine and Brian Taylor operated both "A" and "B" cameras, where one would get a wide shot and the other would get a close-up shot. Statham did all fight and car stunts on his own, including the fight in a helicopter 3,000 feet above Los Angeles.

== Music ==
The soundtrack for the film was released on August 22, 2006. Allmusic gave the album three out of five, stating "What is here is imaginative, creative and head-scratchingly cool. While it's a very tacky and overly obvious thing indeed to end with the Jefferson Starship tune 'Miracles' (why not just give away the ending, huh?), this set is pretty much unassailable."

No.	Title	Length
1.	"A Warrior's Death"	0:13
2.	""Metal Health" by Quiet Riot"	5:16
3.	"Nasal Spray"	0:06
4.	""Trix Are for Kids" by The Crowd"	0:49
5.	"You Stop, You Die"	0:04
6.	""Bandera" by Control Machete"	4:30
7.	"Small Children"	0:06
8.	""New Noise" by Refused"	5:04
9.	"Chinese Sh*t"	0:04
10.	""China Town" by Paul Haslinger"	1:25
11.	"Hardcore Sh*t"	0:05
12.	""Kill All The White Man" by NOFX"	2:46
13.	""Vitamin" by Incubus"	0:04
14.	"Dipsy Doodle"	2:47
15.	""Everybody's Talkin'" by Harry Nilsson"	0:07
16.	"Adrenaline Junkie"	5:33
17.	""Turn Me Loose" by Loverboy"	0:57
18.	""Haitian Cab Ride" by Paul Haslinger"	2:54
19.	""Achy Breaky Heart" by Jarrett & Long"	0:57
20.	"Check List"	0:13
21.	""Adrenalina" by David Rolas"	4:04
22.	"I Kill People"	0:09
23.	""Bring Us Bullets" by Rocket from the Crypt"	3:12
24.	"Eve's Machine"	0:11
25.	""Let's Get It On" by Gerald Levert"	4:25
26.	""Does She Know?" by Paul Haslinger"	0:46
27.	""Stayin' Alive" by The Sleeping"	4:25
28.	"How Much?"	0:04
29.	""Meva Juan" by Roberto Tuscan Feat. Erica Garcia"	0:55
30.	"Juice Me"	0:24
31.	""Guasa, Guasa" by Tego Calderón"	5:17
32.	"It's a Miracle"	0:05
33.	""Miracles" by Jefferson Starship"	6:51

== Release ==
=== Marketing ===
Neveldine/Taylor, along with Jason Statham and Efren Ramirez, appeared at the 2006 Comic-Con Convention in San Diego, California. The panel showed a short clip and promoted the film, mentioning that it was shot in HD and that no wires or CGI were used for the stunt scenes. The filmmakers also made extensive use of web advertisement to promote the film. Lionsgate bought a featured spot on the home page of YouTube and paid several of its well-known members to advertise.

=== Home media ===
The region 2 version of the DVD was released December 26, 2006, but initially had no special features. The region 1 DVD was released by Lionsgate on January 9, 2007. The DVD is available in separate widescreen and fullscreen editions, each with Dolby Digital 5.1 and 2.0 tracks. The bonus materials includes running cast and crew audio commentary, behind-the-scenes footage, gags, maps, making-of insights and interviews with the cast. These features are all accessible via the "Crank'd Out Mode" – a pop-up window feature that allows access to the extras without ever leaving the film. The DVD also includes a "family friendly" audio replacement in which the film is dubbed over as it would appear on a television broadcast, but the violence, language subtitles and nudity are still the same.

== Reception ==
=== Box office ===
Crank opened on September 1, 2006, in North America in 2,515 theaters. It grossed $10,457,367 on its opening weekend and was ranked at No. 2 at the box office, behind Invincible. The film ended up grossing $27,838,408 domestically and $15,092,633 internationally for a total of $42,931,041, on a $12 million production budget.

=== Critical response ===
On Rotten Tomatoes the film holds an approval rating of 62% based on 101 reviews, with an average rating of 6/10. The website's consensus for the film reads, "Crank's assaultive style and gleeful depravity may turn off casual action fans, but audiences seeking a strong dose of adrenaline will be thrilled by Jason Statham's raucous race against mortality." On Metacritic the film has a weighted average score of 57 out of 100 based on 19 critics, indicating "mixed or average" reviews. Audiences surveyed by CinemaScore gave the film an average grade "C+" on an A+ to F scale.

Lionsgate chose not to screen the film for critics or the press prior to its theatrical release. Some filmmakers and actors singled out Crank (and its sequel) among their favorite Statham films, including Seth Rogen, Rupert Grint, Simon Pegg, James McAvoy, Edgar Wright and Gareth Evans.

== Video game ==
A J2ME game was developed by Silverbirch Studios.

== Sequel ==
A sequel titled Crank: High Voltage was released in 2009.
