= Underworld (film series) =

Series of action horror films

- Official film series logo
- Created by: Kevin Grevioux; Len Wiseman; Danny McBride
- Original work: Underworld (2003)
- Owner: Screen Gems (Sony Pictures)
- Years: 2003–2016

Print publications
- Novels: Underworld (2003); Blood Enemy (2004); Evolution (2005); Rise of the Lycans (2008)
- Comics: Underworld (2003); Red in Tooth and Claw (2004); Evolution (2005); Rise of the Lycans (2008); Blood Wars (2017)

Films and television
- Films: Underworld (2003); Evolution (2006); Rise of the Lycans (2009); Awakening (2012); Blood Wars (2016)
- Short film: Endless War (2011)

Games
- Video game: The Eternal War (2004)

Audio
- Soundtracks: Underworld (2003); Evolution (2006); Rise of the Lycans (2009); Awakening (2012); Blood Wars (2017)

Underworld is an action horror film series created by Kevin Grevioux, Len Wiseman, and Danny McBride. It follows characters who are caught up in a war between vampires and werewolves (called "lycans" within the films). Most of the films star Kate Beckinsale as Selene. The first film, Underworld (2003), introduces Selene, an elite vampire-warrior who defies her orders, and Michael Corvin (Scott Speedman), a human who gets caught up in the war. The second film, Underworld: Evolution (2006), directly follows Selene and Michael as they are hunted by their enemies. The third film, Underworld: Rise of the Lycans (2009), is the prequel to the series, chronicling the origins of the vampire-lycan war. The fourth film, Underworld: Awakening (2012), is the sequel to Underworld: Evolution. In this film, humans have discovered the existence of vampires and lycans, and are trying to eradicate both species. A fifth film, titled Underworld: Blood Wars (2016), focuses on Selene who tries to stop a new war between vampires and lycans.

The series received generally negative reviews from critics, but amassed a strong fan following and grossed a total of $539 million, against a combined budget of $207 million.

== Films ==
Underworld films
Film	Release date	Directed by	Screenplay by	Story by	Produced by
Underworld	September 19, 2003	Len Wiseman	Danny McBride	Len Wiseman, Danny McBride & Kevin Grevioux	Tom Rosenberg, Gary Lucchesi & Richard Wright
Underworld: Evolution	January 20, 2006	Len Wiseman	Danny McBride	Len Wiseman & Danny McBride	Tom Rosenberg, Gary Lucchesi, Richard Wright & David Coatsworth
Underworld: Rise of the Lycans	January 23, 2009	Patrick Tatopoulos	Dirk Blackman, Danny McBride & Howard McCain	Robert Orr, Len Wiseman & Danny McBride	Len Wiseman, Tom Rosenberg, Gary Lucchesi & Richard Wright
Underworld: Awakening	January 20, 2012	Björn Stein & Måns Mårlind	Len Wiseman, John Hlavin, Allison Burnett & J. Michael Straczynski	Len Wiseman & John Hlavin	Len Wiseman, Tom Rosenberg, Gary Lucchesi & Richard Wright
Underworld: Blood Wars	November 24, 2016	Anna Foerster	Cory Goodman	Kyle Ward & Cory Goodman	David Kern, Len Wiseman, Tom Rosenberg, Gary Lucchesi & Richard Wright

=== Underworld (2003) ===
Underworld tells the story of Selene (Kate Beckinsale) a Death Dealer bent on destroying the lycans who allegedly killed her family. She discovers that the lycans are pursuing a human, Michael Corvin, for experimentation; Selene captures Michael herself to find out what the lycans are up to. Along the way, Selene not only discovers a mutinous plot to destroy the vampire Elders, but also a shocking revelation about her father figure Elder, Viktor.

The vampires and lycans are not supernatural creatures, but rather the product of a mutation of the Plague.

It is revealed in the film that Alexander Corvinus is the first of the vampire and lycan lines. He was the only survivor of the plague that wiped out his village. Somehow, his body was able to mutate the pathogen, mold it to his own benefit. He had three sons, two of whom inherited their father's immortality and were bitten, one, Markus, by a bat, and the other, William, by a wolf, resulting in the vampire and werewolf lines. Corvinus's unnamed third son, who did not inherit immortality, also carried the Corvinus Strain as an exact duplicate of the original pathogen, hidden away in his genetic code and passed along to his human descendants through the centuries. This, according to Singe, is the key to creating a hybrid.

=== Underworld: Evolution (2006) ===
In Underworld: Evolution, Selene takes Michael to a vampire safe house and plans to return to Viktor's estate to awaken Markus, the last vampire Elder. Before she can return, Markus confronts her, having been awakened by the blood of the lycan scientist, Singe, after he was killed. Markus does not seem keen to help Selene and wishes to steal her memories for information. While on the run from Markus, Selene and Michael discover that Markus is the first vampire and that he plans to free his imprisoned brother, William, the first and most savage werewolf.

=== Underworld: Rise of the Lycans (2009) ===
Underworld: Rise of the Lycans focuses primarily on the origins of some characters and the events leading to the vampire–lycan war, depicted in the previous films.

As shown in the film, the original werewolves were uncontrollable beasts, unable to retake human form once bitten. However, there was a single werewolf who gave birth to a human-looking child. This child carried a mutation of the original pathogen, permitting him to alternate between human and werewolf form. He was Lucian, dubbed by Viktor as "the first of the lycans".

The vampires used the lycans as slaves to be the guardians of their lairs during the daylight hours and labor during the night. However, Viktor's daughter, Sonja, and Lucian fell in love and she became pregnant. Lucian, the lycan leader, led a revolt after Viktor killed Sonja to prevent the blending of the species.

=== Underworld: Awakening (2012) ===
Vampire death dealer Selene escapes imprisonment to find herself in a world where humans have discovered the existence of both vampire and lycan clans, and are conducting an all-out war to eradicate both immortal species. Selene also learns that she has a hybrid daughter born while she was imprisoned, who has the ability to see through her parents' eyes. The same goes for Selene, who has the ability to see through the child's eyes and uses it to find her daughter.

=== Underworld: Blood Wars (2016) ===
On August 27, 2014, Lakeshore Entertainment announced plans to reboot the franchise. Cory Goodman was hired to write the script for the first film. Tom Rosenberg and Gary Lucchesi would be producers. Later it was confirmed not to be a reboot but another entry in the series. The fifth film, originally tentatively titled Underworld: Next Generation, was in production with Kate Beckinsale reprising her role as Selene and Anna Foerster set to direct the fifth film in Prague in October. Theo James was set to reprise his role as David from the fourth film as the new lead, but said that "[his] involvement in it is... I think it's going to be very difficult to do that with these Divergent movies, and my other commitments." James however remained in the film to fulfill an option agreement. In August 2015, it was reported by Deadline Hollywood that Tobias Menzies was cast in the film. In September 2015, Deadline reported that Bradley James, Clementine Nicholson, and Lara Pulver were also cast.

The film was released internationally on November 24, 2016, and in the United States on January 6, 2017.

=== Future ===
In September 2018, Beckinsale cast doubt on appearing in a sixth Underworld film. But by July 2021, she had stated that she was not opposed to reprising the role. Wiseman indicated in 2023 that the franchise would return in some fashion.

== Cancelled projects ==
=== I, Frankenstein crossover ===
A crossover with the film I, Frankenstein (2014) was planned by Kevin Grevioux, co-creator of the Underworld franchise and creator of the I, Frankenstein graphic novel. He stated in an interview that, in an early draft of his screenplay, Beckinsale would have made a post-credit cameo appearance as Selene and that there would have been Underworld easter eggs, but none of this was used.

=== Blade crossover ===
In October 2016, Kate Beckinsale stated that a crossover film between Underworld and the Blade franchise, featuring Wesley Snipes reprising his role as Blade, had been in development and discussed with Marvel Comics the previous year, but was declined after Marvel Studios regained the film rights to the character and planned to introduce him into the Marvel Cinematic Universe.

=== Resident Evil crossover ===
In October 2016, producer David Kern revealed that a crossover film with the Resident Evil film series had been considered.

== Short film ==
Film	U.S. release date	Director	Written by	Producers
Underworld: Endless War	December 20, 2011	Juno John Lee	Jon Schnepp	Tom Rosenberg, Gary Lucchesi & Richard Wright

=== Underworld: Endless War (2011) ===
Underworld: Endless War is a 2011 animated film, which includes three individual short films beginning in 1890 and leading up to the events of Underworld: Awakening. The film follows Selene as she hunts down a group of three lycan brothers in three separate time periods.

== Television ==
In October 2014, Wiseman announced plans to expand the film series into a franchise with the possibility of spin-offs in addition to a television series. In January 2016, the filmmaker confirmed that he is still developing the series though there is no timetable for when it will debut. He stated that the series will explore characters that tie into the film series.

The series officially entered development in September 2017. Wiseman was announced to return to the franchise as executive producer. The filmmaker stated that the series will be a "pretty big departure from the films", specifying that the tone and character of the show will be different. The series will be a joint-venture production between Sony Pictures Television, Screen Gems, Sketch Films, Lakeshore Entertainment, and 20th Century Television. Wiseman indicated the project was still in development in 2025.

== Recurring cast and characters ==
Key
- A ^{Y} indicates the actor portrayed the role of a younger version of the character.
- An ^{O} indicates a role as an older version of the character.
- A ^{V} indicates the actor lent only their voice for their film character.
- A ^{C} indicates a cameo appearance.
- An ^{A} indicates an appearance through archival footage.
- A dark gray cell indicates the character was not in the film.

Characters	Films					Animated short film
Characters	Underworld	Underworld Evolution	Underworld Rise of the Lycans	Underworld Awakening	Underworld Blood Wars	Underworld Endless War
Characters	2003	2006	2009	2012	2016	2011
Selene	Kate Beckinsale	Kate Beckinsale Lily Mo Sheen^{Y}	Kate Beckinsale^{A}	Kate Beckinsale	Kate Beckinsale	Laura Harris^{V}
Viktor	Bill Nighy	Bill Nighy	Bill Nighy		Bill Nighy^{A}	
Lucian	Michael Sheen	Michael Sheen^{A}	Michael Sheen Alexander Carroll^{Y}		Michael Sheen^{A}	
Kraven	Shane Brolly	Shane Brolly	Shane Brolly^{V}		Shane Brolly^{A}	Trevor Devall^{V}
Michael Corvin	Scott Speedman	Scott Speedman		Scott Speedman^{A}	Trent Garrett Scott Speedman^{A}	Mark Oliver^{V}
Erika	Sophia Myles	Sophia Myles^{A}				
Raze	Kevin Grevioux		Kevin Grevioux			
Amelia	Zita Görög	Zita Görög			Sveta Driga Zita Görög^{A}	
Soren	Scott McElroy	Scott McElroy			Scott McElroy^{A}	
Sonja	Jázmin Damek		Rhona Mitra Olivia Taylforth^{Y}			
Kahn	Robbie Gee					
Singe	Erwin Leder	Erwin Leder				
Andreas Tanis		Steven Mackintosh	Steven Mackintosh			
Markus Corvinus	Stand-in	Tony Curran			Tony Curran^{A}	
Alexander Corvinus		Derek Jacobi				
William Corvinus		Brian Steele			Brian Steele^{A}	
Detective Sebastian				Michael Ealy		
Eve				India Eisley	India Eisley^{A}^{S}	
David				Theo James	Theo James	
Thomas				Charles Dance	Charles Dance	
Dr. Jacob Lane				Stephen Rea		
Quint Lane				Kris Holden-Ried		
Marius					Tobias Menzies	
Semira					Lara Pulver	
Darius						Trevor Devall^{V}
Vregis						Brian Dobson^{V}
Krandrill						Paul Dobson^{V}
Lord Clovis						Trevor Devall^{V}

== Additional crew and production details ==
Film	Crew/Detail					
Film	Composer	Cinematographer	Editor(s)	Production companies	Distributing companies	Running time
Underworld	Paul Haslinger	Tony Pierce-Roberts	Martin Hunter	Screen Gems, Lakeshore Entertainment, Subterranean Productions, Laurinfilm	Screen Gems, Sony Pictures Releasing	121 minutes
Underworld: Evolution	Marco Beltrami	Simon Duggan	Nicholas Del Toth	Screen Gems, Lakeshore Entertainment, Vancouver Film Studios	Screen Gems, Sony Pictures Releasing	106 minutes
Underworld: Rise of the Lycans	Paul Haslinger	Ross Emery	Peter Amundson & Eric Potter	Screen Gems, Lakeshore Entertainment, Sketch Films	Screen Gems, Sony Pictures Releasing	92 minutes
Underworld: Endless War	Paul Haslinger	—N/a	Lauren Hecht	Screen Gems, Lakeshore Entertainment, Titmouse	Sony Pictures Home Entertainment	18 minutes
Underworld: Awakening	Paul Haslinger	Scott Kevan	Jeff McEvoy	Screen Gems, Lakeshore Entertainment, Sketch Films	Screen Gems, Sony Pictures Releasing	89 minutes
Underworld: Blood Wars	Michael Wandmacher	Karl Walter Lindenlaub	Peter Amundson	Screen Gems, Lakeshore Entertainment, LStar Capital, Sketch Films, Stillking Films	Screen Gems, Sony Pictures Releasing	91 minutes

== Development ==
In September 2003, shortly after the release of Underworld, production companies Screen Gems and Lakeshore planned to release a prequel as the third film following Underworld's sequel, Underworld: Evolution. Kate Beckinsale, who portrayed Selene in Underworld, expressed interest in reprising her role for the sequel and the prequel.

In December 2005, Underworld: Evolution director Len Wiseman explained that the Underworld franchise was originally conceived as a trilogy. Wiseman said, "We sort of mapped out an entire history and story... a massive collection of ideas and stories that we're putting out at certain times." Wiseman anticipated creating a third installment for the franchise based on the audiences' reception of Underworld: Evolution, which would be released the following month.

In a June 2006 interview, Wiseman said, "The third film is going to be a prequel. It will be the origin story and we find out things we didn't know about Lucian; he'll have a much bigger part in it. It will be about the creation [of the races] and what started the war. It will be a period piece. The film will also focus for the first time through the lycans' point of view." The director also shared, "In terms of the writing, a lot of the writing has been done. We've been developing Underworld 3 for a while. I won't be directing Underworld: Rise of the Lycans; I'm just going to be producing and writing." When asked if Kate Beckinsale would reprise her role as Selene in the prequel, Wiseman said, "It will be in the time period before, but it will overlap into the creation of her as well. We're in the process of seeing how far we go with that." The following October, actor Michael Sheen, who portrays Lucian in the film series, expressed interest in being part of the prequel.

The Hollywood Reporter announced that the film would be written by Danny McBride and mark the directorial début of Patrick Tatopoulos, who designed the creature effects for all three Underworld films. Len Wiseman would produce, and contribute to the writing of this film, but would not direct, nor would Kate Beckinsale reprise her lead role of Selene nor would Scott Speedman reprise his role of Michael. In late September 2007, scribes Dirk Blackman and Howard McCain were brought on board and delivered a draft on November 3, mere days before the 2007–2008 Writers Guild of America strike. Pre-production began shortly thereafter.

"It's like putting your wedding dress on, or putting your school uniform on, it's like a time-warp feeling."

— Kate Beckinsale, about her return as Selene.

The prequel film was shot in Auckland, New Zealand and in Roxboro, North Carolina. There is a brief pickup shot of Tenaya Lake in Yosemite National Park as well.

In a 2009 interview, Underworld co-creator Kevin Grevioux revealed that he had named the Selene character after the Marvel Comics character of the same name.

Filming for Underworld: Awakening began in March 2011 at Simon Fraser University in Vancouver, British Columbia. Underworld: Awakening was the first film to be shot using RED EPIC digital cameras in 3D.

== Reception ==
=== Box office performance ===
Film	Release date	Box office gross			Box office ranking	Budget	Reference
Film	Release date	North America	Other territories	Worldwide	All time North America	Budget	Reference
Underworld	September 19, 2003	$51,970,690	$43,737,767	$95,708,457	#1,382	$22 million	
Underworld: Evolution	January 20, 2006	$62,318,875	$49,021,926	$111,340,801	#1,122	$45 million	
Underworld: Rise of the Lycans	January 23, 2009	$45,802,315	$45,282,848	$91,085,163	#1,582	$35 million	
Underworld: Awakening	January 20, 2012	$62,321,039	$97,791,632	$160,112,671	#1,121	$70 million	
Underworld: Blood Wars	November 24, 2016	$30,353,973	$50,739,340	$81,093,313	#2,499	$35 million	
Total		$252,766,892	$286,573,513	$539,340,405		$207 million	

=== Critical and public response ===
Film	Rotten Tomatoes	Metacritic	CinemaScore
Underworld	31% (162 reviews)	42 (34 reviews)	B+
Underworld: Evolution	17% (104 reviews)	36 (21 reviews)	B+
Underworld: Rise of the Lycans	29% (78 reviews)	44 (14 reviews)	B+
Underworld: Awakening	26% (76 reviews)	39 (17 reviews)	A−
Underworld: Blood Wars	21% (96 reviews)	23 (17 reviews)	B+

== In other media ==
There have been various spin-offs and tie-ins in a range of other media.

=== Comics ===
IDW Publishing has published a number of Underworld comics, which included adaptations of Underworld, Underworld: Evolution, and Underworld: Rise of the Lycans, and the original Underworld: Red in Tooth and Claw, serving as a prequel to Underworld featuring the character Lucian. It is a 3-part comic book series featuring Kevin Grevioux's character, Lycan-enforcer, Raze. Darkstorm Comics also published an adaptation of Underworld: Blood Wars.

=== Novels ===
Pocket Star Books published novelizations of Underworld, Underworld: Evolution, and Underworld: Rise of the Lycans' written by Greg Cox, in addition to an original novel by Cox titled Underworld: Blood Enemy; written before Evolution, it depicts an alternate origin to the war, based on such details as Sonja's initial portrayal as a blonde in flashbacks.

=== Video games ===
A Half-Life mod titled Underworld: Bloodline was released in 2003. An action game based on the first film titled Underworld: The Eternal War was scheduled for release on the PlayStation 2 and Xbox consoles in 2004, but it only saw release for the PlayStation 2 in Europe, and was cancelled in all other regions.
