= Underworld: Evolution =

2006 American action horror film

- Theatrical release poster
- Directed by: Len Wiseman
- Screenplay by: Danny McBride
- Story by: Len Wiseman; Danny McBride
- Based on: Characters by: Kevin Grevioux; Len Wiseman; Danny McBride
- Produced by: Tom Rosenberg; Gary Lucchesi; David Coatsworth; Richard Wright
- Starring: Kate Beckinsale; Scott Speedman; Tony Curran; Shane Brolly; Steven Mackintosh; Derek Jacobi; Bill Nighy
- Cinematography: Simon Duggan
- Edited by: Nicolas De Toth
- Music by: Marco Beltrami
- Production companies: Screen Gems; Lakeshore Entertainment
- Distributed by: Sony Pictures Releasing
- Release dates: January 11, 2006 (Cinerama Dome); January 20, 2006 (United States)
- Running time: 106 minutes
- Country: United States
- Language: English
- Budget: $45 million
- Box office: $113.4 million

Underworld: Evolution is a 2006 American action horror film directed by Len Wiseman from a screenplay by Danny McBride, based on a story by Wiseman and McBride. It is the sequel to Underworld (2003) and the second installment in the Underworld film series. The film stars Kate Beckinsale, Scott Speedman, Tony Curran, Shane Brolly, Steven Mackintosh, Derek Jacobi, and Bill Nighy. The plot follows Selene and Michael, again played by Beckinsale and Speedman, respectively, as they fight to protect the Corvinus bloodline from its hidden past.

Underworld: Evolution premiered at the Cinerama Dome in Los Angeles, California on January 11, 2006, and was released in the United States on January 20, by Sony Pictures Releasing. The film received generally negative reviews from critics and grossed over $113 million worldwide against a production budget of $45 million.

The film was followed by the prequel Underworld: Rise of the Lycans in 2009 and later a direct sequel Underworld: Awakening in 2012.

== Plot ==
In 1202, an army led by the three vampire elders (Markus, Viktor, and Amelia) arrives at a village full of Werewolves. Viktor and Amelia capture their target, Markus's twin brother, William Corvinus, the first and most powerful werewolf. Despite Markus's defiance, Viktor orders that William be forever imprisoned in a secret location.

In the present day, vampire Selene takes Michael to a safe house so that she can confront the vampire regent Kraven; she plans to stop Kraven from killing Markus. Markus awakens before Kraven arrives and kills him and his men. Lorenz Macaro, an elderly man, sends in a team to investigate the aftermath of the battle in the Lycans' lair. When Macaro examines Viktor's corpse he finds a metal disc which matches a pendant originally worn by Sonja. The other half of the pendant is possessed by Michael after Lucian's death.

Using the knowledge of computers obtained from Kraven's blood, Markus tracks Selene and Michael down and attacks them, but they evade him and hide in a warehouse. There, Selene and Michael share their feelings and have sex. Knowing that the pendant is important to Markus, Michael and Selene set out to discover why he wants it. Selene recalls that she saw it as a child, but does not know its significance. They travel to the hideout of the exiled vampire historian Andreas Tanis.

Tanis reveals that Markus was the first vampire, one of the three sons of Alexander Corvinus, the first immortal. Markus was bitten by a bat and metamorphosed into a vampire, while William was bitten by a wolf and metamorphosed into a werewolf. The third son remained human and gave rise to a line of mortal descendants including Michael, who became the first Lycan-Vampire hybrid. The first werewolves created by William were entirely feral and unable to return to their human forms. Due to William's destructiveness, Markus approached Viktor, then a dying mortal warlord, and offered to metamorphose him and his army into vampires in exchange for tracking down and stopping William, and destroying those he had infected. Viktor did not kill the brothers because he was led to believe that doing so would result in the immediate extinction of all vampires and Lycans. Tanis further reveals that Selene's father was the architect who built William's prison and that the pendant is the key. Viktor killed Selene's family because they knew the prison's location, but metamorphosed Selene into a vampire with the location of the prison encoded in her blood. Tanis then refers Selene and Michael to Macaro for help. After Selene and Michael leave, Markus arrives and drinks Tanis' blood to learn Selene and Michael's location, killing Tanis.

Visiting Macaro, Selene and Michael discover he is Alexander Corvinus, the forefather to both the vampire and Lycan races. Alexander reveals that he has devoted his entire immortal life to keeping the Vampire-Lycan war a secret, and refuses to assist Selene in killing his sons. Markus arrives, fights Michael and impales him. He learns the location of William's prison by drinking Selene's blood before mortally wounding his father and obtaining the other half of the pendant. He mocks his father's refusal to help William, revealing that he intends, with William, to rule the world as the master of a race of vampire-Lycan hybrids. At Alexander's bidding, Selene drinks his blood, enhancing her physical strength and healing abilities to a level equivalent to that of a hybrid. Afterwards, Alexander blows up his ship, killing himself.

Selene, aboard Alexander's helicopter, leads his team to the prison to confront and destroy Markus, but he has already freed William. In the ensuing battle, Michael, presumed dead and carried aboard the helicopter, awakens and joins the fight in his hybrid form, killing William by ripping his head off. Selene engages Markus in hand-to-hand combat, killing him by pushing him into the rotor blades of the team's crashed helicopter.

After the battle, Selene discovers that Alexander's blood granted her hybrid abilities, including being immune to the effects of sunlight, which is lethal to vampires.

== Cast ==
- Kate Beckinsale as Selene, a Death Dealer
  - Lily Mo Sheen as young Selene
- Scott Speedman as Michael Corvin
- Tony Curran as Markus Corvinus
- Derek Jacobi as Alexander Corvinus / Lorenz Macaro
- Steven Mackintosh as Andreas Tanis
- Shane Brolly as Kraven
- Bill Nighy as Viktor
- Zita Görög as Amelia
- Brian Steele as William Corvinus
- Andrew Kavadas as Selene's Father
- Kayla Levins as Selene's Sister
- John Mann as Samuel

== Soundtrack ==
Underworld: Evolution (Original Motion Picture Soundtrack)

Soundtrack album
- Released: January 10, 2006
- Genres: Alternative rock, alternative metal, post-hardcore, industrial, nu metal, metalcore, gothic metal
- Length: 62:19
- Label: Lakeshore
- Producers: Skip Williamson, Brain McNelis & Len Wiseman

Professional ratings
Review scores
Source	Rating
Allmusic	1.5/5 stars

Track listing

No.	Title	Artist	Length
1.	"The Undertaker" (Renholdër Mix)	Puscifer	3:57
2.	"Morning After" (Julien-K Remix)	Chester Bennington	4:14
3.	"Where Can I Stab Myself in the Ears?" (The Legion of Doom Remix)	Hawthorne Heights	3:58
4.	"To the End" (RnR Cheryl Mix)	My Chemical Romance	3:12
5.	"Vermillion, Pt. 2" (Bloodstone Mix)	Slipknot	3:39
6.	"Burn" (Alleged Remix)	Alkaline Trio	4:02
7.	"The Last Sunrise" (Dusk Mix)	Aiden	3:55
8.	"Bite to Break Skin" (The Legion of Doom Remix)	Senses Fail	4:08
9.	"Her Portrait in Black"	Atreyu	4:02
10.	"Washing Away Me in the Tides"	Trivium	3:47
11.	"Eternal Battle"	Mendozza	4:10
12.	"Our Truth"	Lacuna Coil	4:04
13.	"Cat People (Putting Out Fire)"	Gosling	5:01
14.	"Why Are You Up"	Bobby Gold	3:10
15.	"Suicide"	Meat Beat Manifesto	3:14
16.	"HW2" (Cover of "Halloween II", originally recorded by Samhain)	Cradle of Filth	3:38

== Release ==
=== Box office ===
The film opened at #1 on 3,207 screens with a weekend box office (January 20–22, 2006) of $26.9 million, for an average of $8,388 per theater. As of March 12, 2006, the film had grossed a total of $62.3 million in the United States and $111.3 million worldwide.

=== Critical response ===
As of August 31, 2021, Underworld: Evolution has a 17% overall approval rating on Rotten Tomatoes based on 104 reviews, with an average rating of 3.9/10. The site's consensus reads, "A visual and aural assault on the senses, this vampire-werewolf sequel makes a lot of noise and features a heavy-handed, overly convoluted story." Metacritic, which uses a weighted average, assigned the film a score of 36 out of 100, based on 21 critics, indicating "generally unfavorable" reviews. Audiences polled by CinemaScore gave the film an average grade of "B+" on an A+ to F scale.

A few scenes of the film were shown in a panel at Comic-Con in San Diego, in July 2005; however, these scenes did not contain any plot spoilers of the script, with attendees only being informed about the new hybrids by production designer Patrick Tatopoulos. The preview was well-received as hundreds of fans waited hours to see a clip of the film, as well as Kate Beckinsale and the other stars.

Jeannette Catsoulis of The New York Times criticized the film's "steel-blue filter" and described it as "a monotonous barrage of computer-generated fur and fangs." Peter Hartlaub of the San Francisco Chronicle began his review by saying, "you can tell that Underworld: Evolution is trying to be an artistic action-horror film, because every scene is bathed in the color blue," going on to say that the film is "an admirable attempt to test the boundaries of the genre," though is confusing and not fun to watch.

=== Home media ===
The film was released on DVD on June 6, 2006, and on Blu-ray on June 20, 2006.

=== Accolades ===
Award	Subject	Nominee	Result
MTV Movie Awards	Best Hero	Kate Beckinsale	Nominated
Scream Awards	Scream Queen	Kate Beckinsale	Won

== Prequel and sequel ==
The next film in the series, the prequel Underworld: Rise of the Lycans, depicted the background history that led to the Vampire-Lycan War of the first and second films. A fourth and fifth film, the sequels to Underworld: Evolution, titled Underworld: Awakening and Underworld: Blood Wars, were released on January 20, 2012, and January 6, 2017, respectively.

== See also ==
- Vampire film
