= Underworld: Endless War =

2011 animated film by Juno John Lee

- Official release poster
- Directed by: Juno John Lee
- Written by: Jon Schnepp
- Based on: Characters created by: Kevin Grevioux; Len Wiseman; Danny McBride
- Produced by: Tom Rosenberg; Gary Lucchesi; Richard Wright
- Starring: Laura Harris; Trevor Devall; Brian Dobson; Paul Dobson; Mark Oliver
- Music by: Paul Haslinger (Underworld: Rise of the Lycans soundtrack)
- Production companies: Lakeshore Entertainment; Titmouse, Inc.
- Distributed by: Sony Pictures Home Entertainment
- Release date: December 20, 2011
- Running time: 18 minutes
- Countries: United States; Canada
- Language: English

Underworld: Endless War is a 2011 anime-influenced adult animated anthology film consisting of a collection of three short tie-in stories, whose creation was supervised by Len Wiseman, director of the first two Underworld films. Each film tells a different story, and takes place during different periods of history to highlight new events within the Underworld mythology. The stories also help set up the events in the next film in the series, Underworld: Awakening (2012).

These shorts were released on December 20, 2011, as a part of the new Underworld Trilogy: The Essential Collection for Underworld on Blu-ray. It is also available on YouTube. Each episode is just over five minutes long.

== Plot ==
=== Part I ===
In 1890, Selene is in Paris, investigating reports of three Lycan brothers who terrorize the area. They seem to be posing as lords and have claimed a mansion as their own. Selene's mission is to investigate the reports, eliminate these self-styled "Lords of the Crescent Wills", and secure the mansion for the Paris branch of the Old World Vampire Coven. The reason that Kraven and higher-ups want the castle is to put the balance of power in the area in favor of the Vampires. Determined to exterminate the Lycan Lords, Selene makes her way after Darius, the oldest brother.

Arriving at the mansion, Darius informs his brothers, twins Vregis and Krandrill, that a Death Dealer has found them. The two do not take him seriously, and, against Darius' warnings, insist to stay and fight. Thinking that they have her at a disadvantage, all three brothers try to ambush Selene in the sewers. Selene, however, proves to be greater than their estimations. With a pair of swords, she mortally wounds Darius, who then sacrifices himself to shield his brothers against her gunfire. Vregis and Krandrill flee while Darius dies and vow revenge against the Death Dealer and the Vampires.

=== Part II ===
In 1967, 77 years later, Selene returns to Paris to investigate reports of the two remaining Lycan brothers. Unbeknownst to her, she is spotted in the streets by Krandrill. He meets up with Vregis in the backroom of a store that they use to sell illicit substances and tells him what he saw. The two figure that she's there to protect Lord Clovis at the 'Crimson Moon ceremony', which is being held at their old mansion, and decide to crash in, kill her with the other Vampires, and reclaim their old home.

In the middle of the ceremony, the two Lycans appear and eliminate Lord Clovis and his fellow vampires, before Selene appears and opens fire on them. During the ensuing fight, Vregis dies and Krandrill loses his left arm. As he flees, Selene comments that it is only a matter of time before he'll 'join his brothers in hell'.

=== Part III ===
In 2012, 45-years-later, Selene returns to Paris with the intention of finally killing Krandrill, and has brought Michael Corvin with her to help. Since Alexander Corvinus' death, humanity has caught on to the existence of vampires and lycans. They have begun to identify and exterminate those that are 'infected'. Selene and Michael split up to cover more ground; Selene is sent a picture by her contact, a female security guard, confirming Krandrill's regular presence at the Tati hotel. Krandrill is there with his harem of female Lycans, waiting for Selene and Michael to appear.

Michael crashes through the entrance, only to be taken by surprise by Krandrill and his harem. After pinning Micheal to the wall with grappling guns, the Lycans open fire on him. Michael breaks free and slashes through the harem, before being taken on by Krandrill himself. Krandrill, however, underestimates his enemy's strength and is sent flying out of a window. Selene then jumps onto him, sends him down to street below, and peppers him with silver bullets. Before dying, Krandrill gives a passing taunt that her kind is being hunted now, and that she'll soon join him and his brothers in hell.

In a voiceover, Selene comments about the 'endless war': "I don't feel 'victory'; this never ends. (About Kandrill's Last Words) He might be right. We are the Hunted. But as long as I have him (Michael), I'm all right. As long as we're together, I can live forever..."

== Voice cast ==
- Hybrid
  - Selene (Laura Harris)
  - Michael Corvin (Mark Oliver)
- Lycans
  - Darius (Trevor Devall)
  - Vregis (Brian Dobson)
  - Krandrill (Paul Dobson)
- Vampires
  - Kraven (Trevor Devall)
  - Lord Clovis (Trevor Devall)

== See also ==
- Juno Lee
- Jon Schnepp
- Chris Prynoski
- Shannon Prynoski
- Antonio Canobbio
- Dong Woo Animation
