= Selene (Underworld) =

- Underworld character
- Kate Beckinsale as Selene
- First appearance: Underworld
- Last appearance: Underworld: Blood Wars
- Created by: Len Wiseman; Kevin Grevioux; Danny McBride
- Based on: Selene Gallio by Chris Claremont and Sal Buscema
- Portrayed by: Kate Beckinsale; Lily Mo Sheen (child); Laura Harris (voice)
- Voiced by: Kate Beckinsale; Atsuko Tanaka (Japanese Dub)

In-universe information
- Alias: Subject 1
- Species: Human (originally); Vampire (formerly); Evolved Vampire
- Gender: Female
- Occupation: Death Dealer (formerly); Vampire Elder
- Family: Unnamed father (deceased); Unnamed mother (deceased); Cecilia (sister, deceased); Unnamed twin nieces (deceased); Viktor (sire and adoptive father, deceased)
- Spouses: Michael Corvin (lover, deceased); David (couple)
- Children: Eve (daughter)
- Nationality: (Hungary) Hungarian
- Birth: 1383 AD

Selene is a character and the main protagonist of the Underworld film franchise, in which Kate Beckinsale portrays her. The character is introduced in the first film, Underworld, as an elite vampire assassin known as a "Death Dealer" who hunts down the Lycans for allegedly murdering her family. She becomes attracted to a human named Michael Corvin, and upon discovering that her sire and adoptive father Viktor was actually responsible for the death of her family, defects from the vampire clan.

== Creation ==
Selene was created by Kevin Grevioux, Len Wiseman, and Danny McBride. According to Grevioux, Selene is based on the X-Men villain of the same name, appearing in comic books published by Marvel Comics. Selene was introduced in the first film of the series, Underworld.

== Character ==
Selene was born in the late 14th century and grew up as a normal, happy, vibrant child. She and her sister Cecilia loved painting pictures and playing games like 'Silly Goose'. However, at the age of nineteen, the untimely and gruesome deaths of her entire family completely traumatised her and left her an orphan. The deaths of her six-year-old nieces were the most difficult for her to accept. Her family's real murderer, Viktor, tricked her into believing that a pack of Lycans were responsible for the killing. And so, Selene dedicates herself to avenging their deaths.

As a Death Dealer (the Vampires' fighting elite), Selene commits herself to the duty of exterminating the Lycans as a species, a duty she sees as 'sacred', burying herself in her work. She also isolates herself, never socialising with anyone outside of the Death Dealers, as the majority of the Vampire Coven are more concerned whiling away their immortal lives in hedonistic pursuits instead of concerning themselves with the serious business of the war against the Lycans.

She also serves as one of Viktor's most loyal and most powerful Death Dealers, having been vampirically sired by him personally. While she looks up to Viktor as a surrogate father figure (and he sees her as a surrogate daughter), she never stops feeling grief over the loss of her real family.

According to Kate Beckinsale in The Making of Underworld, by the point in time of the events of the first movie, Selene has been a soldier of the Vampire Clan for so long, it has gotten to the point where "[Selene's] almost forgotten she's a woman, she's absolutely focused on revenge and killing, and she's really good at it. Then, she meets Michael, and she starts to get a... kind of memory of what it's like to be human, and to be with humans. She's not completely human, but she is actually 'human' somewhere underneath there."

According to the novelisations of the events of the movies, prior to crossing paths with Michael, Selene had never been in love before. She was not a virgin; neither love nor lust had lured Selene into 'carnal encounters' with other vampires, but rather curiosity and loneliness. Such encounters are few, infrequent, and without consequence, all of them temporary indulgences quickly put behind her.

=== Personality ===
Selene is headstrong and stubborn, even to a fault, not willing to back down when she knows something is wrong, when she is investigating Lycan activity. This can continue even to the point of endangering herself, such as when she passed out from blood loss at the wheel of her car after Michael warned her against driving in her condition. Selene is described as being "steely-eyed" and having great "emotional independence" from the rest of the Coven, as well as being of "extreme intelligence" and of "sharp intuition". In her Underworld official bio, it is stated that she "trusts almost no one" and that she has a "passion for truth, albeit laced with vengeance", which "traps her in a reluctantly violent and tragic purpose".

After centuries of militaristic discipline, having served as a Death Dealer of the vampire clan, Selene had long since developed a near-impervious, stoic external demeanour. Selene is not known for a sense of humour and is actually one of the franchise's most honest vampires. She is also something of an idealist, believing in certain ideals as justice. Although a vampire for six centuries, Selene only really willingly interacted with other Death Dealers and has never fit in with her own kind (most of whom are too absorbed in their own pursuits of self-gratification) unlike them, Selene has never forgotten why she became a vampire and that they are at war with the Lycans, which leads her to consider them layabouts and dead weight, so she cares little for what they all think of her.

In the first instalment, Kraven, who fancies himself as her suitor, complains that she pays far too much attention to hunting and killing Lycans, and that she takes "this warrior business far too seriously". Selene, meanwhile, regards Kraven as "a pig, a coward and an insufferable egotist" who is too wrapped up in himself to even pick up on the fact that, simply, Selene doesn't want anything to do with him, let alone be his arm-trophy at the coven's social events. She dodges his social gatherings, she outright rejects his romantic advances at every turn, in public and in private, and she prefers to dedicate her every waking hour to her calling as a Death Dealer.

For the most part, Selene comes across as "icy" and "unemotional" to those who don't really bother to get close to her, like most of the coven. After years of being a disciplined soldier, Selene is well into the habit of keeping her emotions in check and keeps her cool in the heat of battle and in the face of danger. This same rigorous mentality has made it difficult sometimes to open up to others, especially Michael, early in the story. By her own admission, she's "not good with feelings". In the first novelisation, she is described as being "much more comfortable discussing interrogation techniques" than "divulging the seamier underside of the vampiric lifestyle". In Underworld: Awakening, her own daughter easily misinterprets her behaviour for being "as cold as one already dead", before Selene explains that her heart isn't cold, but it is broken (as Michael is missing at the time) Selene is also in the habit of downplaying any pain or wounds she has received - a habit of hers that Michael has since become familiar with.

Cracks in Selene's emotional armour start to show themselves when she and then-human Michael Corvin meet for the first time at a subway, moments before a shootout, at the beginning of the first film. Other vampires, like Kraven and Erika, quickly catch on to Selene's feelings towards Michael before even she herself does. The two experience a mutual "dynamic attraction" at first sight, and things start to escalate between the two of them, even after she learns that Michael has been bitten by a lycan while she was trying to protect him from them. Because of his innocence, Selene defends Michael from both vampire and lycan, knowing full well Viktor would kill her for doing so.

Selene also becomes noticeably more violent when those she loves suffer or die. When her family was murdered, she went on a revenge spree against the Lycans (whom she had been led to believe were responsible by Viktor) that lasted over six centuries, until the truth was revealed to her. When she learns of Viktor's hand in her family's murder and sees him about to kill Michael, she slices through his head with his own sword, the first shot she gets, without hesitation. Furthermore, when she believes Michael is dead by Markus's hand, she goes on a suicide mission to eliminate Markus and William, before Michael's hybrid abilities revive him; Selene doesn't care if she dies, just as long as she can take Markus and William down with her. When Markus brings up her family, after impaling her with one of his wing talons, saying how it was a "mistake" for Viktor to have "(kept Selene) as a pet. He should have killed you with the rest of your family" (in the novelisation, Markus also calls them "insignificant"); in a fit of rage, Selene snaps the wing talon off at a joint, using it to stab him through the head before pushing him into the spinning rotors of a helicopter. In Underworld: Awakening, when her daughter is taken by the Lycans at the Antigen facility, Selene stages an attack on the building, luring the Lycan security personnel into a trap by taking the elevator up the building and setting silver gas explosives at every floor to get back her daughter.

== Biography ==
=== Backstory ===
As revealed in the first & second films, Selene is born to a Hungarian family; her father, mother, her older sister Cecilia, and her baby twin nieces. Selene is estimated to have been born around the year 1383.

At some point, Selene's father is approached by a powerful warlord named Viktor with a commission to design and build a prison. According to the novelisations, Selene's father is well known as both a stone mason and a blacksmith, and the commission involves the excavation of a new dungeon and prison under a fortress of Viktor's, as well as striking two unique keys for one cell in particular. Selene is around 6–7 years old when work on the prison is completed.

Seven years later, at around age 13 to 14, Selene becomes an aunt to her older sister's twin daughters.

During the winter of Lucian's escape, about 6-years-later, Viktor fears that Lucian may know of William, the progenitor of all werewolves, (given that Lucian, whether he knew it or not, was now holding one of the keys to William's prison): To Keep the Location of William's prison a secret, Viktor kills everyone involved in the construction of the prison and anyone who may have visited or seen the fortress. One night, Viktor prowls into the farm of Selene's family, kills, and feeds upon them one by one. When he comes across Selene, however, he finds that he 'could not bear the thought of draining [her] dry' (as described by Kraven) '[Selene], who reminded him so much of his precious Sonja'.

That night, Viktor turns Selene into a vampire. She is 19 years old when she is turned. He leads her to believe that the culprits of the murder of her family are Lycans and that Viktor saved her from them. He claims he'd been tracking The Lycans when they led him to her family's farm. With the strength of a vampire, Viktor tells Selene, she can avenge them all. Selene is the only survivor to have walked through the corridors of the fortress. Viktor does not kill her because she resembles his deceased daughter, and he believes that she is much too young to remember where exactly the fortress's location is.

Selene goes on to become a Death Dealer, fighting against the Lycans for vengeance. For the centuries that follow (the better part of a thousand years), she serves under Viktor with blind loyalty, remaining in the dark about her family's murder by none other than Viktor himself.

On Viktor's orders, Selene exiles Andreas Tanis, the Coven's official historian. At some point, she also becomes the unwilling object of the romantic interests of Kraven, the Coven's regent.

=== Underworld ===
After a confrontation with the Lycan hitman Raze, she discovers what is supposedly a Lycan lair. She is angry when Kraven dismisses her claims, not knowing that Kraven is in league with the Lycan leader Lucian in a bid to take over the control of the vampire realm from the Elders.

She tracks down Michael Corvin, in whom she believes the Lycans have an interest. Against the sacred laws of The Vampire Covenant, she and Michael, who is infected with the lycanthropy virus, fall in love.

She awakens Viktor from his deep slumber (torpor), believing that only he has the power to deal with the conspiracy between Kraven and Lucian. She then leads a mass assault on the Lycans' underground bunker.

After Michael is shot with silver nitrate by Kraven, Selene is forced to infect Michael with her vampire strain to save his life, thus making him the first hybrid. She also learns the truth about the identity of her family's killer from Kraven; she strikes Viktor down while the Elder is preoccupied fighting Michael. She then retrieves Sonja's pendant, carrying on her legacy.

=== Underworld: Evolution ===
In Underworld: Evolution, after Viktor's death, Selene and Michael go on the run from both Lycans and Vampires. They are confronted by Markus, the last surviving Vampire Elder. He is now a Vampire-Dominant Hybrid, due to his ingesting the blood of Lycan scientist Singe, which seeped into his chamber. As Markus attacks her, Michael intervenes and battles him to protect her.

After narrowly escaping Markus and the sunlight, Selene and Michael take refuge in a warehouse and begin a sexual relationship. Selene also finds that she has seen the pendant that Markus was trying to get when she was a child. In order to find out why Markus was after the pendant, she sought out Andreas Tanis. Tanis tells her the truth about her family's slaughter (they were killed after Lucian began his revolution to keep William from being freed) and reveals to her that, contrary to popular belief, Markus, not Viktor, is the original vampire.

He then sets up a meeting for her and Michael with Alexander Corvinus, Markus's father and the first true immortal. Selene is angered at Alexander for not removing the threat his sons, Markus and William, posed long ago. Alexander retorts by asking her if she would murder her own son. An interruption by Markus, in which Michael is seemingly killed, also results in Selene's memories of the fortress being revealed to Markus through her blood. Alexander, dying from his son's attack, tells Selene that the only way to defeat Markus and William is to drink his legendary immortal blood, adding that she will become "The Future". Selene gains greater strength and new powers from Alexander's blood.

She and a squad of Alexander's Cleaners (who, like Michael, are Alexander's descendants through his third son) invade William's dungeon, trying to stop the threat. They arrive too late, however, and Selene is forced to fight Markus. Markus is shocked at the smell of his father's blood coursing through Selene's veins. Locking Markus in William's dungeon, Selene discovers that William infected all surviving members of the six Cleaners escorting her, all of whom become Lycans.

Markus kills the last remaining Cleaners who are operating a helicopter which provides close air support/suppressing fire. When it crashes, the rotors continue to spin dangerously close to those in the fray.

Selene fights Markus once more, and the Elder drives his wing talon through her chest. Selene, empowered by Alexander's ancient and pure blood, tears away the talon and drives it upwards through Markus's skull before throwing him into the moving rotor blades and killing him. After Selene defeats Markus and Michael defeats William, sunlight lands on Selene's arm, revealing that Alexander's blood has purged the vampiric weakness to sunlight.

=== Underworld: Rise of the Lycans (2009) ===
Underworld: Rise of the Lycans is a 2009 American film directed by Patrick Tatopoulos. It is the third instalment (chronologically the first) in the Underworld series, focusing primarily on the origins of some characters and the events leading to the vampire–lycan war, depicted in the previous films Underworld and Underworld: Evolution.

As shown in the film, the original werewolves were uncontrollable beasts, unable to retake human form once bitten. However, there was a single werewolf who gave birth to a human-looking child. This child carried a mutation of the original pathogen, permitting him to alternate between human and werewolf form. He was Lucian, dubbed by Viktor as "the first of the Lycans".

The vampires used the Lycans as slaves to be the guardians of their lairs during the daylight hours and labour during the night. However, Viktor's daughter, Sonja, and Lucian fell in love, and she became pregnant. Lucian, the lycan leader, led a revolt after Viktor killed Sonja to prevent the blending of the species. The opening scene of the first Underworld film is then shown with the voice of vampire Kraven revealing to Selene that it was Viktor who killed her family, not the Lycans. Kraven adds that Viktor spared Selene's life because she reminded him of his executed daughter, Sonja. Selene, unaware of the truth, dismisses Kraven's statement as "lies".

=== Underworld: Awakening ===
In Underworld: Awakening, Selene escapes imprisonment to find herself in a world where humans have discovered the existence of both Vampire and Lycan clans, and are conducting an all-out war to eradicate both immortal species. However, Selene and her two new allies; David (a young vampire) and Detective Sebastian (who lost his wife after being discovered as a vampire), discover a hidden conspiracy from rogue members of the Lycan clan within the humans' war against both species, and also finds that she has mothered a child with Michael, Eve, who was born during Selene's suspended animation.

Despite their never having met or become acquainted with one another since Eve's birth, Selene ultimately bonds with her daughter. Selene battles to rescue Eve and Michael, facing a 'Super Lycan' with abilities similar to her own, including an incredible healing rate and an immunity to silver. Eventually, Selene kills the Super Lycan and rescues Eve, who kills the Lycan doctor in charge, but when they go to rescue Michael (whom Selene had found and weakened the cryogenic tank earlier), they find that he has already escaped and are unable to locate him, but Selene knows he will be hunted like Eve was.

Earlier in the film, David offers her the opportunity to return to the vampire coven, in hopes she will consent to train a new generation of Death Dealers in response to both the human and Lycan threats, as many of their numbers are either in hiding from their enemies or dead.

=== Underworld: Blood Wars ===
Following the events of Awakening, Selene sends Eve away for her own safety, with not even Selene knowing where she is. Selene keeps a lock of Eve's hair in remembrance and is hunted by the Lycans for Eve's location and the Vampires as a traitor for killing the Vampire Elder Viktor.

In response to the threat posed by the new Lycan leader, Marius, the Vampire Council agrees to grant Selene clemency in exchange for Selene training their Death Dealers to fight this new threat. David eventually convinces Selene to take the offer, but she is betrayed by Council member Semira and her lover, Death Dealer Varga. Semira desires revenge for Viktor's death and covets Selene's power for herself. With the help of David and his father Thomas, Selene escapes, but not before at least a litre of her blood is drained, and Thomas is killed.

Following Thomas's last wishes, David and Selene travel to the Nordic Coven, where David is revealed to be the son of the Vampire Elder Amelia and her rightful heir. Selene meets the Nordic warrior Lena, who shows her the Nordic Coven's cocooning process, a process that enables them to access the "special place" between worlds and enhance their abilities. Shortly afterwards, Marius and his Lycans attack the Coven and Selene is defeated. Marius learns from Selene's blood memories that she truly does not know where Eve is, and remembering that Lena told her the cocooning process starts with the Vampire submerging themselves in water, Selene submerges herself in a frozen lake. She is later retrieved by David and Lena and cocooned properly.

During the Lycan attack on the Eastern Coven, Selene returns with her powers enhanced by the cocooning, wearing the coat of a member of the Nordic Coven and with her hair having turned partially white. Selene leads the Nordic Vampires to the aid of the Eastern Coven and battles Marius, learning from his blood memories that he murdered her lover, Michael and is using his blood to temporarily increase his own abilities (believing that Eve's blood will make this permanent). Selene uses her new speed to get behind Marius and rip out his spine, killing him. David is then able to use Marius' head to get the remaining Lycans to retreat.

Following the battle, Selene helps to treat the injured vampires' wounds and is elected one of the new Vampire Elders, alongside David and Lena, making Selene one of the three new leaders of the entire Vampire race. In a flash forward, it is revealed that Selene was reunited with Eve while at the Nordic Coven.

== Skills and vampiric attributes ==
Selene is proficient with many weapons, medieval and modern. She is well-versed with both projectile and melee weapons. Modern firearms that she uses include the Walther P99 and a variety of fully automatic machine pistols. Selene is also an expert in unarmed combat. In Blood Wars, Selene's combat skills are stated to be "second to none." In all three films, she is seen jumping from a ledge of at least one hundred feet and landing without injury.

As a vampire, Selene frequently demonstrates superior physical abilities. After absorbing the Corvinus strain directly from Alexander Corvinus, Selene's powers were greatly upgraded. Following her use of the Nordic Coven's sacred ritual, Selene's already incredible powers were greatly enhanced. Selene is stated to be "the Purest Vampire" due to having Alexander Corvinus' blood and is one of the most powerful, if not the most powerful, of all Vampires at the time of Blood Wars.

- Superhuman agility: Selene is able to perform athletic moves, such as doing a backflip into a hole in a bridge and leaping from tree to tree in an instant. In Awakening, she is able to do a spinning head scissors to a Lycan and is seen jumping over two cars with one hand. Selene's agility has proven to help her in battle against the Lycans, allowing her to take on multiple Lycans at once. She has shown the ability to cling to the walls like an insect.
- Superhuman healing: She can heal rapidly from most wounds in just minutes, including sunlight burns and a shotgun blast to the abdomen. However, injuries that result in massive loss of blood in a short time can be fatal and she must ingest fresh blood in order to properly heal. After becoming a Vampire-Corvinus Strain Hybrid, her healing powers were increased to the point where she could withstand Marcus's wing talon being impaled through her chest without suffering any visible effects and survive after being shot in the head and other parts of her body. She is also seen to be able to force bullets out of her body.
- Superhuman strength: Being a vampire, later a vampire-human hybrid, Selene is even much stronger than humans and most other supernatural creatures. She grabs Michael by the throat and holds him against a wall several feet off the ground, performs spectacular leaps, and strikes her enemies with tremendous force. She is able to kill younger vampires with just a few blows and manhandles four police officers with ease. She is shown to be able to engage Lycans in close-quarter combat without being harmed, even before becoming infected with the Corvinus strain. After her infection, she is shown to be able to ram her arm through a Lycan in battle and has also gone toe-to-toe in a physical fight against Marcus, despite his status as the first vampire and a hybrid. In the stunt's featurette on the Underworld DVD/Blu-ray, the stunt coordinators mention how they have to make it look like Selene had the "strength of ten men". In Underworld: Awakening, she uses the greatest extent of her strength seen to date when she flips a van, which has momentum equal to 180 tons. In Underworld: Blood Wars, thanks to the Nordic Coven's enhancement, Selene is able to rip the spine out of a transformed Lycan hybrid with her bare hands.
- Superhuman speed: She moves with incredible celerity, able to move between streets and run across hallways, appearing as nothing more than a blurred image. In Underworld: Evolution, Selene was quick enough to sprint by and incapacitate a group of police officers without them being able to keep up with her movements. In Underworld: Awakening, she is shown speeding through two lines of armed guards while slitting their throats with a scalpel in the process, and then disappearing in an instant. She also demonstrates speed akin to teleportation when she breaks into a scientist's apartment and moves right next to him in an instant. In Underworld: Blood Wars, after her powers are enhanced by the Nordic Coven, Selene's speed grows to the point that she can move about as a blur that no one is capable of following.
- Superhuman senses: Being a vampire means she has increased senses like hearing, sight, smell, etc.
- Superhuman durability: She is seen jumping from a ledge at least 100 feet (12 floors) high and landing without injury. She can leap to high places with ease, as seen when jumping over large fences. She can take a shotgun blast to the abdomen without flinching. She is able to perform amazing feats of strength without fatigue and can withstand the crushing depths of the ocean without a wetsuit or breathing apparatus.
- Blood sorting: In Underworld: Awakening, Selene demonstrates the ability to absorb and read another Immortal's blood memories (similar to that of the Elders) by drinking the blood of her daughter, Eve. In Underworld: Blood Wars, she is able to use this ability to read the memories of David, the Lycan Marius and herself by drinking her own blood.
- Immunity to UV light: Due to her nature as a vampire-human hybrid, Selene possesses a pure Immortal's immunity to UV light. At the end of Underworld: Evolution, her eyes are shown to be able to turn almost a pure white, and she is now able to walk in the sunlight. Selene is shown using this ability to ambush the Lycans in daylight during Underworld: Awakening and to escape with David in Underworld: Blood Wars. When talking with Detective Sebastian, Selene calls her UV immunity a gift from Alexander Corvinus.
- Sensory synchronisation: Selene and her daughter can perceive each other psychically when in relative proximity to each other.
- Resurrection: Selene has displayed the ability to resurrect deceased vampires as vampire-human hybrids like herself by applying her blood directly to their hearts, as she did when she resurrected David in Underworld: Awakening. This is an ability unique to her, as shown by other vampires' amazement over her ability to resurrect David in Underworld: Awakening.
- Increased speed: In Underworld: Blood Wars, it is later revealed that Selene had been resurrected by the Nordic Coven after undergoing the ritual of passing to the sacred world and had received new powers, including enhanced speed.

== In other media ==
Selene appears in the video game Underworld: The Eternal War. Selene is the third-person shooter throughout the missions.

== Production background ==
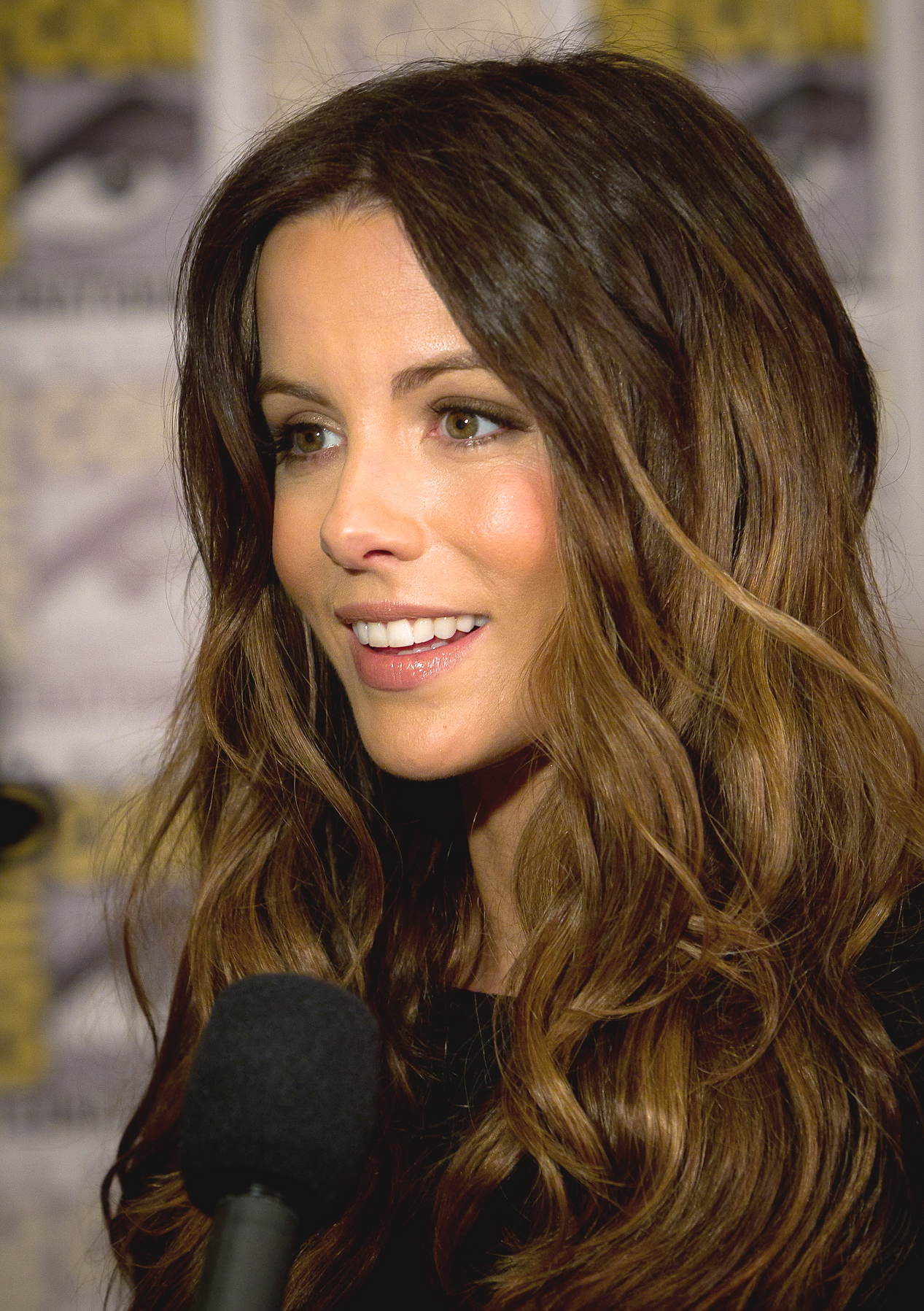
Kate Beckinsale at San Diego Comic-Con in 2011

In 2003's Underworld, Kate Beckinsale became known as an actor and stated that it was markedly different from her previous work, and Beckinsale has said she was grateful for the change of pace after appearing in "a bunch of period stuff and then a bunch of romantic comedies." "It was quite a challenge for me to play an action heroine and pull off all that training when [in real life] I can't catch a ball if it's coming my way." The film received mostly negative reviews but, surprisingly, was a box-office hit and has gained a cult following.

In September 2003, shortly after the release of Underworld, production companies Screen Gems and Lakeshore planned to release a prequel as the third film following Underworld's sequel, Underworld: Evolution. Kate Beckinsale, who portrayed Selene in Underworld, expressed interest in reprising her role for the sequel and the prequel.

In 2006, Beckinsale reprised her role as Selene in the successful vampire sequel Underworld: Evolution, directed by her husband. It was the first time she had "been involved with a movie from the moment it's a germ of an idea right through the whole editing process." Her daughter had a small role as the younger Selene, and took direction well: "I didn't think she would take either of us that seriously. We both envisaged a situation where it would be kind of like trying to get her into a snow suit. She suddenly became highly professional ... She said, “Could you call me Selene?” I certainly don't insist on being called Selene, so she didn't get that from me."

In a June 2006 interview, When asked if Kate Beckinsale would reprise her role as Selene in the prequel, Wiseman said, "It will be in the time period before, but it will overlap into the creation of her as well. We're in the process of seeing how far we go with that."

In the actual film, Selene appears briefly at the end. Beckinsale did not film new footage; a scene from Underworld was used to bookend the film. Beckinsale also provided a monologue for the beginning of the film.

"It's like putting your wedding dress on, or putting your school uniform on, it's like a time-warp feeling."

— Kate Beckinsale, about her return as Selene.

Beckinsale returned to the role of Selene for the fourth installment of the vampire franchise Underworld: Awakening. She "wasn't intending to do another one" but was convinced by the quality of the script: "You really want to see stakes that mean something in these kind of movies. Otherwise, it really is just lots of explosions and people running around in tight clothes."

== Publication history ==
Selene appears in the non-canon novel Underworld: Blood Enemy, written by Greg Cox. Selene is responsible for the death of renegade Lycan Leyba, tracking her down after Leyba's forces attack a Lycan weapons deal and are responsible for the deaths of both the Lycans and another member of Selene's team. During the confrontation with Leyba, Leyba briefly reflects that Selene's eyes are like 'hers' (Sonja's), but Selene never learns the meaning of this comment before she kills Leyba. Leyba's goals remain a mystery to Selene.

Selene also appears in the IDW Publishing Underworld series. She is portrayed as having the same characterization as seen in the film. She also appears in the sequel novelization series for Underworld: Evolution. The only novelization series of Underworld she hasn't appeared in is the novelization for Underworld: Rise of the Lycans.

== Reception ==
Though the first film received generally negative reviews from critics, several elements were praised by audiences and a number of reviewers, including the "icy English composure" in Kate Beckinsale's performance as Selene.

A few scenes of Underworld: Evolution were shown in a panel at San Diego Comic-Con, in July 2005; however, these scenes did not contain any plot spoilers of the new script, with attendees only being informed about the new hybrids by production designer Patrick Tatopoulos. The preview was well-received as hundreds of fans waited hours to see a clip of the film as well as Kate Beckinsale and the other stars of the movie.

In a review for Underworld: Awakening, a top critic from Variety said "Once again, Beckinsale brings an impressive physicality and subzero cool to her portrayal of Selene".

== Merchandise ==
Due to the impact of the films, action figures for Selene were created, all designed by Mezco. Their size is 5 inches in scale. They all come with a display base and accessories.

== See also ==
- Women warriors in literature and culture
- List of women warriors in folklore
