= Underworld: Blood Wars =

2016 film by Anna Foerster

- Theatrical release poster
- Directed by: Anna Foerster
- Screenplay by: Cory Goodman
- Story by: Kyle Ward; Cory Goodman
- Based on: Characters by: Kevin Grevioux; Len Wiseman; Danny McBride
- Produced by: Tom Rosenberg; Gary Lucchesi; Len Wiseman; Richard Wright; David Kern
- Starring: Kate Beckinsale; Theo James; Lara Pulver; James Faulkner; Charles Dance
- Cinematography: Karl Walter Lindenlaub
- Edited by: Peter Amundson
- Music by: Michael Wandmacher
- Production companies: Screen Gems; Lakeshore Entertainment; LStar Capital; Sketch Films
- Distributed by: Sony Pictures Releasing (United States); Falcon (Czech Republic)
- Release dates: November 24, 2016 (International); December 8, 2016 (Czech Republic); January 6, 2017 (United States)
- Running time: 91 minutes
- Countries: Czech Republic; United States
- Language: English
- Budget: $35 million
- Box office: $81.1 million

Underworld: Blood Wars is a 2016 action horror film directed by Anna Foerster from a screenplay by Cory Goodman, based on a story by Kyle Ward and Goodman. It is the sequel to Underworld: Awakening (2012) and the fifth and final installment in the Underworld film series. The film stars Kate Beckinsale, Theo James, Lara Pulver, James Faulkner, and Charles Dance.

Principal photography began in October 2015 in Prague, Czech Republic.

Underworld: Blood Wars was released in select countries on November 24, 2016, and was released in the United States on January 6, 2017. The film was panned by critics and grossed $81.1 million worldwide against a production budget of $35 million, making it the lowest-grossing film in the franchise.

== Plot ==
The remaining vampire covens are on the verge of annihilation by the Lycans. Both species are searching for Selene: the vampires seek justice for the death of Viktor, while the Lycans, led by Marius, intend to use her to locate Eve, whose blood holds the key to building an army of vampire-werewolf hybrids.

Semira, a council member of the Eastern Coven, asks Thomas to plead Selene's case before the council. The plea is successful and the council reluctantly agrees to a pardon in exchange for Selene's help. Selene arrives with David and starts training the coven's neophyte Death Dealers for the upcoming war. Semira and Varga, her ally and lover, later poison Selene, slaughter the trainees and frame her for the atrocity. With Selene in her custody, Semira begins draining her blood, intending to drink it to steal her power. Thomas and David attempt a rescue and manage to save Selene. Unfortunately, Thomas dies in the process.

David and Selene take refuge at the Nordic Coven, pursued by Alexia, an Eastern Coven vampire dispatched by Semira. At Var Dohr, the Nordic Coven stronghold, Elder Vidar reveals that David is the son of Grand Elder Amelia. She and Thomas were in love but were forced to hide their relationship and David's true origins due to Victor's extreme jealousy and possessiveness over Amelia. This makes David the legitimate heir to the Eastern Coven.

Meanwhile, Alexia tells Marius, her secret lover, that Selene is going to the Nordic Coven. Marius and his Lycans attack Var Dohr to get her. Selene and David fight alongside the Nordic vampires, who are led by Vidar's daughter Lena. During the fight, Alexia stabs Selene. Marius demands to know Eve's location, but finds out Selene does not know, so he sounds the retreat. Selene deliberately drowns under the broken ice of the lake, telling herself that 'my time is done'.

At the Eastern Coven, Semira drinks the blood taken from Selene. Alexia returns and informs her of the attack at the Nordic Coven. Semira kills Alexia, telling her that she knew of her secret alliance with Marius. David returns to the Eastern Coven, presents himself as its rightful heir and denounces Semira. Even Varga deserts her, saying his loyalty is to the rightful leader. She is led off to be imprisoned in her room.

The coven comes under attack by Marius and his forces. The Lycans blow holes in the castle's walls, letting in sunlight and killing some vampires. David continues fighting, even using himself to shield several young fighters, to the shock and admiration of Varga. He however finds himself face to face with Marius. Selene suddenly reappears, now Nordic in appearance and wearing a coat over her Death Dealer uniform. It turns out that she was resurrected by the Nordic Coven and now has new powers, including enhanced speed. She swiftly dispatches the Lycans, as the Nordic Coven joins the fight.

As Selene makes her way through the castle, Semira escapes from her room and kills the guards. Selene and David find Marius, but David is waylaid by Semira. During the fight, a drop of Marius' blood lands on Selene's lips and she is suddenly flooded by his memories. She sees Marius capturing Michael Corvin and slitting his throat to collect his blood and consume it. To counter her despair over Michael's death, she bites her own wrist, accessing her own blood memories of time spent with him. Selene then rips out Marius' spine, killing him instantly. Meanwhile, David manages to kill Semira. He shows Marius' severed head to the Lycans and calls on them to collect their wounded and retreat.

In the aftermath, Selene, David, and Lena are chosen as the new Elders. It is revealed that following her resurrection at the Nordic Coven, Selene was reunited with Eve, who had been tracking her mother through their telepathic link. Having anticipated this connection, Selene had deliberately blinded herself to Eve's location to protect her, ensuring she never truly abandoned her daughter.

== Cast ==
- Kate Beckinsale as Selene, a Death Dealer
- Theo James as David, a Vampire hybrid / Vampire elder and Selene's protégé, ally and new potential romantic interest after Michael Corvin's death
- Lara Pulver as Semira, a fiercely ambitious Vampire
- Tobias Menzies as Marius, a Lycan leader.
- Bradley James as Varga, the Eastern Coven's leading Death Dealer
- Peter Andersson as Vidar, the elder of the Nordic Coven
- James Faulkner as Cassius
- Clementine Nicholson as Lena, the Nordic Coven's greatest warrior / Vampire elder and daughter of Vidar
- Daisy Head as Alexia, a neophyte Death Dealer from the Eastern Coven and Marius's vampire lover
- Oliver Stark as Gregor
- Charles Dance as Thomas, a Vampire Elder and David's father.

Trent Garrett portrays Michael Corvin, a Lycan-Vampire Hybrid, and Selene's lover. Michael and his daughter, Eve, are also Alexander Corvinus' distant descendants. Garrett replaces Scott Speedman, who played the role in two of the previous four films. Speedman appears in archival footage from Underworld and Underworld: Evolution for key scenes in Blood Wars. Zita Görög, who played the role of Amelia in the first two films but had retired from acting, appears in archival footage from Underworld: Evolution for several key scenes in Blood Wars. India Eisley, who portrayed Eve in the fourth film, appears in archival footage from that film. Eve is portrayed in Blood Wars by a stand-in as being older.

== Production ==
=== Development and Casting ===
On August 27, 2014, Lakeshore Entertainment announced their plans to develop a reboot of the Underworld franchise, with Cory Goodman hired to write the script for the first film. Tom Rosenberg and Gary Lucchesi were named as producers. The film was later confirmed to be a fifth entry in the series, rather than a reboot. Titled Underworld: Next Generation, the film was in production and set to be released in 2015. Theo James, who appeared in the role of David in the fourth film, would return as the new lead. On October 12, 2014, director Len Wiseman told IGN that original Underworld lead Kate Beckinsale would be back for the film. On May 14, 2015, Anna Foerster signed on to make her directorial debut with the film, being the first woman to direct a film in the series, with Beckinsale confirmed to return. On August 14, it was announced by Deadline Hollywood that Tobias Menzies had been cast as Marius, a mysterious new Lycan leader. On September 9, Bradley James was cast as the male villain. Same day, newcomer Clementine Nicholson signed on to play Lena, the Nordic Coven's greatest warrior and daughter of Vidar. On September 22, Lara Pulver was added to the cast to play a fiercely ambitious Vampire. On October 19, Charles Dance was confirmed to return to play Vampire elder Thomas. Additional cast was also announced which included James Faulkner, Peter Andersson, and Daisy Head.

=== Filming ===
Principal photography on the film began on October 19, 2015, in Prague, Czech Republic, and was set to take place over ten weeks. The film's crew included cinematographer Karl Walter Lindenlaub, production designer Ondřej Nekvasil, costume designer Bojana Nikitović, and editor Peter Amundson. Filming wrapped up on December 11, 2015.

== Release ==
Initially the film was set for an October 21, 2016, release. After announcement about release delay, the film's earliest release date became November 24, 2016, when the film was released in Russia, Ukraine, Georgia and Kazakhstan, followed by December 1, 2016, release in various countries such as El Salvador and Australia. It was released in the U.S. on January 6, 2017.

=== Home media ===
Underworld: Blood Wars was released on Digital HD on April 11, 2017, by Sony Pictures Home Entertainment. The film was released on Blu-ray and DVD on April 25 2017.

=== Box office ===
Underworld: Blood Wars grossed $30.4 million in the United States and Canada and $50.7 million in other territories for a worldwide total of $81.1 million, against a production budget of $35 million.

In North America, the film was expected to gross $15–19 million over its opening weekend. It went on to open to $13.7 million, down 49% from the previous installment, finished fourth at the box office and marking the lowest debut of the franchise. The film made $6.2 million in its second weekend and in its third was dropped from 1,604 theaters (the 105th biggest third-week theater decrease of all time) and made $1.7 million.

=== Critical response ===
As of June 2020, the film holds a 21% approval rating on the review aggregator website Rotten Tomatoes, based on 96 reviews, with an average rating of 4/10. The site's critical consensus reads, "Underworld: Blood Wars delivers another round of the stylized violence that the series is known for, but – like many fifth franchise installments – offers precious little of interest to the unconverted." Metacritic, which uses a weighted average, assigned the film a score of 23 out of 100, based on 17 critics, indicating "generally unfavorable" reviews. Audiences polled by CinemaScore gave the film an average grade of "B+" on an A+ to F scale.

Rafer Guzman of Newsday called the film the weakest and most bloodless of the series, with "third-rate" special effects and "clunky" action scenes. Ben Kengisberg of the New York Times wrote that the film was "so heavy with exposition" that the director and screenwriter were making "a dissertation instead of a sequel", and criticized what he saw as the film's "almost willful lack of fun". Frank Scheck of The Hollywood Reporter wrote that the film was a "generic, by-the-numbers" exercise that was "strictly anemic", given "all its talk of blood". He did praise the acting of Beckinsale and Dance, also saying that the presence of Dance continued the tradition of distinguished British actors "appearing in Hollywood crap in lieu of receiving a proper pension".

Peter Travers of Rolling Stone was very negative in his review, writing that "scraping bottom would be a step up" for the film, and that the franchise "needs [a] stake through the heart". In a positive review, Owen Gleiberman of Variety wrote that it was "gun-blazing, body-splattering business as usual", and that the film made "a token stab at actual theatrical drama" in setup for the "action slaughter" that is "its own (numbing) reward". He also praised the performances of Beckinsale, Pulver, and especially, Dance.

== Possible sequel ==
In 2017, Wiseman revealed that a sixth film is also in development with Beckinsale reprising her role as Selene. On September 13, 2018, Beckinsale said she will not appear in the sixth film should it be made, stating: "I wouldn't return. I've done plenty of those". In July 2021, however, she backtracked and stated that she was not opposed to reprising the role.
