= Underworld: Awakening =

- Theatrical release poster
- Directed by: Måns Mårlind; Björn Stein
- Screenplay by: Len Wiseman; John Hlavin; J. Michael Straczynski; Allison Burnett
- Story by: Len Wiseman; John Hlavin
- Based on: Characters by: Kevin Grevioux; Len Wiseman; Danny McBride
- Produced by: Tom Rosenberg; Gary Lucchesi; Len Wiseman; Richard Wright
- Starring: Kate Beckinsale; Stephen Rea; Michael Ealy; Theo James; India Eisley; Charles Dance
- Cinematography: Scott Kevan
- Edited by: Jeff McEvoy
- Music by: Paul Haslinger
- Production companies: Screen Gems; Lakeshore Entertainment; Sketch Films
- Distributed by: Sony Pictures Releasing
- Release dates: January 18, 2012 (Grauman's Chinese Theatre); January 20, 2012 (United States)
- Running time: 86 minutes
- Country: United States
- Language: English
- Budget: $70 million
- Box office: $160.1 million

Underworld: Awakening is a 2012 American action horror film directed by Måns Mårlind and Björn Stein from a screenplay by Len Wiseman, John Hlavin, J. Michael Straczynski, and Allison Burnett, based on a story by Wiseman and Hlavin. It is the direct sequel to Underworld: Evolution (2006) and the fourth installment in the Underworld film series. The film stars Kate Beckinsale, Stephen Rea, Michael Ealy, Theo James, India Eisley, and Charles Dance.

Principal photography began in March 2011 in Vancouver, British Columbia, Canada.

Underworld: Awakening premiered at the Grauman's Chinese Theatre in Los Angeles, California on January 18, 2012, and was released in the United States on January 20, by Sony Pictures Releasing. The film received generally negative reviews from critics. It was the highest grossing film in the Underworld film series, grossed over $160 million worldwide against a production budget of $70 million.

The film was followed by Underworld: Blood Wars in 2016.

== Plot ==
Six months after the events of the second film, both the government and the general public have become aware of the existence of the Vampires and Lycans. A program to study and potentially harness their powers soon escalates into an all-out genocide and shortly after the Purge begins, Selene and Michael are captured by humans. Due to her enhanced vampiric traits, Selene is imprisoned in cryogenic suspension.

After being frozen for twelve years, during which both species have been hunted to the brink of extinction, Selene manages to escape. She learns that another subject has also fled from the facility. While running away, Selene has visions from someone else's point of view. She follows the visions and encounters David, a young vampire who has been tracking her. Sick and weakened Lycans also appear; they are hunting the subject with whom Selene is connected. Selene fights her way through the Lycan pack and reaches the second escapee: a frightened and confused young girl.

Selene, David and the girl drive away using a stolen van, only to be attacked once again by a trio of Lycans. David and Selene kill two while the third smashes its way into the rear of the vehicle and bites the girl's shoulder. She partially transforms and rips the creature in half, revealing her hybrid traits. Selene realizes this is her and Michael's daughter. During her own escape from the facility, the girl found Selene's cryogenic tank and deactivated it. That is why Selene could escape. Despite her hybrid nature, the girl's bite wound does not heal and she is rapidly growing weaker, so David decides to take the pair to his coven.

After she reluctantly drinks some blood, her wound heals. But as they do not feel welcome in the coven, due to the fact that the girl is noticeably different from Vampires, Lycans and even Hybrid, Selene prepares to leave. David tries to convince her to stay and help them start an offensive against the humans. Before she makes up her mind, the coven comes under attack by Lycans. Selene joins the fight and kills many Lycans before being knocked unconscious by a huge "Super-Lycan" that heals instantly and is not affected by silver. She later awakens and finds that Thomas, David's father, has surrendered her daughter to the Lycans in return for them leaving. David has been mortally wounded in the battle, but Selene revives him with her blood. After leaving, she confronts Sebastian, a human detective who is sympathetic to the vampires due to his dead wife being a vampire. Sebastian confirms that the Lycans have been traced to Antigen, the corporation dedicated to killing off vampires. They also run the facility from which Selene has escaped.

Antigen is actually run by Lycans, who have been posing as humans in order to trick the world's governments into believing the Lycans are extinct. The director of Antigen, Dr. Jacob Lane, is trying to perfect the Lycan race and needs the DNA of Selene's daughter to do so. The "Super-Lycan" Selene faced earlier is Quint, Lane's son and the prototype for Lycan modifications. Selene and Sebastian assault Antigen to stop Lane and save Selene's daughter, who they begin calling "Eve". Selene comes across Subject 0, whom she identifies as Michael, and attempts to free him by shooting his cryogenic tank. However, she is forced to leave the thawing Michael in order to stop the Lycans from escaping with Eve. David, who since being healed by Selene's blood has inherited her immunity to sunlight, arrives and helps the heroes. In the ensuing fight, Selene confronts Quint. She tricks him into returning to his more vulnerable human form by hiding in a narrow tunnel and kills him by implanting a silver grenade in his stomach. Meanwhile, Eve kills Lane by ripping out his throat. As the police arrive, Selene, Eve, and David return to Michael's tank and find it empty. Knowing that the world will be hunting Michael, the trio vows to find him first.

== Cast ==
- Kate Beckinsale as Selene, a Death Dealer
- India Eisley as Eve, a hybrid; daughter of Selene and Michael Corvin. The Lycans intend to use her DNA to enhance themselves, primarily to make themselves immune to silver and to further enhance their own fast healing.
- Theo James as David, a vampire; son of Thomas. Killed by a Lycan during an attack in the coven and later revived by Selene.
- Michael Ealy as Detective Sebastian; he was once married to a vampire. Witnessed his wife burn by sunlight when the government conducted a door-to-door extermination. Helped Selene rescue Eve.
- Stephen Rea as Dr. Jacob Lane; the head scientist of Antigen. He is secretly a Lycan using Eve's DNA to enhance himself and is the father of Quint.
- Charles Dance as Thomas, a vampire; Father of David
- Sandrine Holt as Lida
- Kris Holden-Ried as Quint; the Super Lycan. Son of Dr. Jacob Lane. The first test subject of Antigen's Lycan enhancement through the use of Eve's DNA, he has the ability to heal instantly and is immune to silver.
- Robert Lawrenson as Waterfront Cop
- Ron Wear as Jack Fletcher
- William Francis as Police Officer
- Wes Bentley (uncredited) as Antigen Scientist

Scott Speedman, who appeared as Michael Corvin in the first two films in the series, announced that he would not be reprising his role for the fourth installment, however he did appear in archive footage from the first and second films, although a stand-in was used in the scenes where he is seen in an unconscious state.

== Production ==
It's like putting your wedding dress on, or putting your school uniform on, it's like a time-warp feeling.

— Kate Beckinsale, about her return as Selene.

The fourth Underworld film was in development ever since 2009, when Len Wiseman came up with the story for the film. It was actually the first original sequel story starring Selene, since originally the first two films were one long script. Screenwriter John Hlavin was the first one who wrote the script based on Wiseman's story that same year. Between 2009 and 2011 it went through many re-writes and changes by other writers, including some who are not credited in the final film. One of the credited writers, J. Michael Straczynski, wrote his version in September 2010, right when Kate Beckinsale officially signed on to star in the film. Wiseman himself also did some revisions on the script before filming started, sometimes alone or with other writers. A February 2011 draft of the script lists revision credit he did with another writer, Allison Burnett, who already did his own re-write of the script earlier.

Despite it already going through a number of writers and different versions, the film began principal photography without a finished script in March 2011 at Simon Fraser University in Vancouver, British Columbia. Due to all the changes made on the script, much of the first promotional material was based on earlier storylines, which is why it includes some differences. For example, Antigen was originally called BioCom, Selene was imprisoned by the corporation for 15 years instead of 12, her daughter was originally called Nissa and she was 14 years old instead of 11, and the original title would have been Underworld 4: New Dawn, although in August 2011 interview producer Richard Wright said that many different subtitles were suggested and thrown out, including Underworld 4: New Moon.

Måns Mårlind and Björn Stein said in interviews that while the story for the film was good, nobody was "super happy" about the script. It underwent continuous changes throughout production, with the tone of it going from more of a "wink-wink" with some humor and irony, to more serious like the original films were. Mårlind and Stein also ended up working on script re-writes, along with Wiseman, producer Gary Lucchesi and another new screenwriter, but none of them were credited in the film.

Wright also mentioned how for some reason production of this film was more difficult than others. Wiseman, who was working on the remake of Total Recall at the same time, was often called for help, and sometimes he would have to re-write a scene the night before it was filmed. Mårlind and Stein also said that the entire ending is not the one which they originally had when production started, and how the ending which is in the film was written during filming, although they gave no details about what the original ending was. Earlier versions of the script also included an alternate opening, in which Selene's cryo tank is destroyed by an escaped mutated Lycan, who would then stalk a weakened Selene around the lab until she manages to escape. This was possibly changed due to problems the scene would cause with trying to cut around nudity. Selene would then find a medical gown which she would wear through the rest of the film until she finds an outfit very similar to her old one inside David's vampire coven. The latter part of this scene was still kept in the January and February 2011 revised drafts of the script but in the film this was changed so her original outfit is kept in the same room she escapes from. The plot point about the corporation planning to use Selene and Eve as breeders of super hybrids was also dropped and instead in the film they are after Eve's DNA.

Due to the unfinished and changing script, second unit director and visual effects supervisor James McQuaide faced difficulty designing some of the characters. storyboards for the film by Martin Bergquist also reveal how entire scenes including some action sequences were fully planned but ended up being cut.

Underworld Awakening is one of the first films to be shot using RED EPIC digital cameras in 3D.

== Music ==
=== Soundtrack ===
Underworld: Awakening (Original Motion Picture Soundtrack)

Soundtrack album by various artists
- Released: January 17, 2012 (Digital); January 31, 2012
- Label: Lakeshore Records

The soundtrack was released to digital outlets on January 17, 2012, by Lakeshore Records. Most of the songs were remixed by Danny Lohner and use work from the bands Evanescence, Linkin Park, The Cure, Lacuna Coil and Aesthetic Perfection amongst others.

1. "Made of Stone" (Renholdër Remix) – Evanescence
2. "Heavy Prey" – Lacey Sturm of Flyleaf feat. Geno Lenardo
3. "Blackout" (Renholdër Remix) – Linkin Park
4. "Apart" (Renholdër Remix) – The Cure
5. "Killer & a Queen" – Stella Katsoudas of Sister Soleil feat. Geno Lenardo
6. "Watch Yourself" (Renholdër Remix) – Ministry
7. "Trip the Darkness" (Ben Weinman Remix) – Lacuna Coil
8. "Young Blood" (Renholdër Remix) – The Naked and Famous
9. "It Rapes All In Its Path" – Black Light Burns
10. "The Posthumous Letter" – William Control
11. "How'm I Supposed to Die" – Civil Twilight
12. "Consolation Prize" – & SONS
13. "Liar" (Revenant mix by 8MM) – 8MM
14. "You Won't See The Light" – Ryan T.Hope of The Lifeline feat. Geno Lenardo
15. "Bottle of Pain" – Combichrist
16. "Intruder" – Collide
17. "Exit Wounds" (Justin Lassen Remix) – Justin Lassen feat. Silent Fury

=== Score ===
Underworld: Awakening (Original Motion Picture Score)

Film score by Paul Haslinger
- Released: January 31, 2012
- Label: Lakeshore

Underworld: Awakening (Original Motion Picture Score)
No.	Title	Length
1.	"The Purge"
2.	"Underworld: Awakening Main Titles"
3.	"Raiding the Army Surplus Store"
4.	"Non-Human Aggressor"
5.	"I Was Subject 2"
6.	"Arriving at the Coven"
7.	"I've Never Seen a Child Like This"
8.	"This Is Not One of Us"
9.	"I Know Exactly What You Are"
10.	"If You Knew Him As I Did"
11.	"Prepare the Armory"
12.	"The Uber-Lycan"
13.	"Reanimation"
14.	"Then Came the Purge"
15.	"Selene Returns to Antigen"
16.	"Find Her and Destroy Her"
17.	"The Lycan Van Escape"
18.	"I Heal Instantly"
19.	"You Came Back"
20.	"Reclaiming the World"
21.	"The Melancholy of Resistance"
22.	"A New Dawn"
23.	"Corner (Justin Lassen Remix) – Blue Stahli"
24.	"Under Your Skin (Deadbeat Remix) – Aesthetic Perfection"
25.	"Sunrise – Angelspit"

== Reception ==
=== Box office ===
The film grossed $25 million in first place during the opening weekend of January 20–22, 2012. It eventually grossed $62 million in North America and another $97 million overseas, in which brings the worldwide total of $160 million, making it the highest grossing film in the franchise. This also makes it the first film of 2012 to surpass the $100 million mark.

=== Critical reception ===
Underworld: Awakening received generally negative reviews from film critics. Review aggregation website Rotten Tomatoes gave the film a score of 25%, based on 76 reviews, with an average rating of 4.4/10. The site's consensus reads, "There's more vapid action and less story in Underworld: Awakening than previous installments, making the whole affair feel inconsequential." Metacritic has given the film a score of 39 out of 100, based in 17 critics. Audiences polled by CinemaScore gave the film an average grade of "A−" on an A+ to F scale.

Movie review website The Filtered Lens gave the film a negative review citing that "if you try and pay attention to the plot you will get a headache". However, they did note that the action was well done and said it was the goriest of the series. Film critic Chris Pandolfi viewed the film positively, especially compared to the first two in the franchise, saying "although it's about as lasting as dust in the wind, I think it represents what the series should have been right from the start: An escapist supernatural action thriller that gives us license to put our brains on autopilot."

=== Accolades ===
Award	Subject	Nominee	Result
BMI Film & TV Awards	Film Music Award	Paul Haslinger	Won
