= Gary Lucchesi =

American film producer (born 1955)

- Born: January 4, 1955 (age 71); San Francisco, California, U.S.
- Occupation: Film producer
- Years active: 1984–present

Gary Lucchesi (born January 4, 1955) is an American film producer who was President of Lakeshore Entertainment and past President of The Producers Guild of America.

== Career ==
Lucchesi began his career at The William Morris Agency as an agent, representing such artists as Susan Sarandon, Kevin Costner, Michelle Pfeiffer and John Malkovich. Lucchesi served as both Vice President and Senior Vice President of Production at TriStar Pictures before becoming President of Production at Paramount Pictures. Following his time at Paramount, Lucchesi founded Gary Lucchesi Productions, where he produced the Oscar nominated film Primal Fear. Lucchesi was also President of Andrew Lloyd Webber's Really Useful Film Co., producing the film version of the hit musical Cats. In 1997, he was asked by Tom Rosenberg to run Lakeshore. He served as both President and President Emeritus of the Producers Guild of America. Lucchesi has been a member of the Academy of Motion Picture Arts and Sciences since 1988.

Lucchesi graduated from Sacred Heart Cathedral Preparatory in San Francisco in 1973 before attending UCLA. He graduated with a degree in history in 1977.

Lucchesi was awarded the Order of the Star of Italy (Ondine della Stella d'Italia) for his contributions to the Italian and American film industries on November 12, 2025.

== Filmography ==
He was a producer in all films unless otherwise noted.

=== Film ===
Year	Film	Credit	Notes
1992	Jennifer 8		
1995	Virtuosity		
1995	Three Wishes		
1996	Primal Fear		
1998	Cats	Executive producer	Direct-to-video
1998	Just the Ticket		
1999	Runaway Bride	Executive producer	
2000	Passion of Mind	Executive producer	
2000	The Next Best Thing	Executive producer	
2000	Autumn in New York		
2000	The Gift		
2002	The Mothman Prophecies		
2003	The Human Stain		
2003	Underworld		
2004	Wicker Park		
2004	Madhouse	Executive producer	
2004	Suspect Zero	Executive producer	
2004	Million Dollar Baby	Executive producer	
2005	Undiscovered		
2005	The Cave		
2005	The Exorcism of Emily Rose		
2005	Æon Flux		
2006	Underworld: Evolution		
2006	She's the Man	Executive producer	
2006	Crank		
2006	The Covenant		
2006	The Last Kiss		
2006	The Dead Girl		
2007	Blood & Chocolate		
2007	Feast of Love		
2008	Henry Poole Is Here		
2008	Untraceable		
2008	Elegy		
2008	Pathology		
2008	The Midnight Meat Train		
2009	Underworld: Rise of the Lycans		
2009	Crank: High Voltage		
2009	The Ugly Truth		
2009	Gamer		
2009	Fame		
2011	The Lincoln Lawyer		
2011	Underworld: Endless War		Direct-to-video
2012	Underworld: Awakening		
2012	One for the Money		
2012	Gone		
2012	Stand Up Guys		
2014	I, Frankenstein		
2014	Walk of Shame		
2015	The Age of Adaline		
2015	The Vatican Tapes		
2016	The Boy		
2016	American Pastoral		
2016	Underworld: Blood Wars		
2018	Adrift	Executive producer	
2018	A.X.L.		
2018	Peppermint		
2019	The Wedding Year		
2019	The Killing of Kenneth Chamberlain	Executive producer	
2020	Brahms: The Boy II		
2023	57 Seconds		
2024	In Our Blood		
TBA	Rode to Ruin		

Thanks

Year	Film	Role	Notes
2011	Underworld: Endless War	Special thanks	Direct-to-video

=== Television ===
Year	Title	Credit	Notes
1996	Gotti	Executive producer	Television film
1997	Breast Men	Executive producer	Television film
1998	Great Performances	Executive producer	
1999	Vendetta	Executive producer	Television film
2001	Wild Iris	Executive producer	Television film
2004	Independent Lens	Consulting producer	Documentary
2018	Heathers	Executive producer	
