= Underworld: The Eternal War =

2004 video game

- European box art depicting the character Selene
- Developer: Lucky Chicken Games
- Publisher: Play-It
- Directors: Jamie Ottilie; Jon Hilliard; James Ryman; Matt Saia
- Designer: Matt Saia
- Platform: PlayStation 2
- Release: EU: January 16, 2004
- Genres: Action, top-down shooter
- Modes: Single-player, Multiplayer

Underworld: The Eternal War (also known as Underworld: The Game) is a 2004 top-down shooter video game developed by Lucky Chicken Games and released for the PlayStation 2. It is based on the 2003 action film Underworld. It was originally planned to be released alongside the movie on Xbox and PC. Both versions were cancelled at some point.

== Plot ==
The storyline revolves around the eternal war between the vampires and lycans, and as the player, they can choose the side they are teaming with. The players can choose the movie's main character, the vampire Selene, or the lycan Raze and also choose between a selection of other vampires, other Lycans or the hybrid.

The player is tasked with taking to the battlefields where they must accomplish missions, whether protecting someone, killing someone, getting an item from somewhere, or simply attacking everyone. Using different weapons, the player slaughters enemies throughout the action-based gameplay.

== Reception ==
Reception

Review scores
Publication	Score
Hyper	12%
Jeuxvideo.com	6/20

The Eternal War received mixed to negative reviews on release. Edge described the game as a "fun playing experience", citing the "good buddy AI" the upgrade system and weapon types, although noting "the 3D camera is restrictive". Daniel Wilks of Hyper dismissed the game for its "dull and linear" levels, "poorly animated and incredibly stupid" opponents, and the "dull textures", "limited polygons" and "uninspiring effects" of its visual presentation. Jeuxvideo found the game to be a waste of time, critiquing the game's character models and effects, "lousy" aiming system and camera, and "small" levels.
