= List of Underworld characters =

The following list of characters from the Underworld franchise.

== Vampires ==
Their metamorphosis is not nearly as startling as their Lycan counterparts. When they metamorphose, their eyes turn a shade of electric blue or bright gold, while their upper canine teeth lengthen to become pointed fangs. At all times, the upper lateral incisors and upper canine teeth on all vampires are elongated and come to a sharp point. Biologically immortal transgenics, the Vampires of Underworld display most of the prominent superhuman physical prowess commonly seen in popular culture, including superhuman strength, reflexes and speed, as well as an inhuman resistance to injury and accelerated healing. These abilities are maintained by feeding on blood, which is a prominent factor in their healing capabilities in addition to being strengthened with age. They do not possess any of the mystical weaknesses of mythological Vampires (crosses, holy water, garlic, stakes, etc.); however, they are highly vulnerable to ultraviolet radiation. They can also die from a broken neck, blood loss, nightshade poisoning, dismemberment, mutilation, and other extreme physical trauma, especially if their head or heart is destroyed or removed.

The oldest Vampires, the Elders, are the strongest of their race, even stronger than Lycans in Werewolf form. In the novelizations, the Vampire population as a whole is referred to as the "Vampire Nation", consisting of covens; traditionally, before the events of Evolution, the two main covens were the Old World Coven (based in Hungary, in the environs of Budapest, with branch covens all-over the Euro-Asian continent), and the New World Coven (based in the United States, in New York). However, the original Vampire Elders, Lady Amelia, Lord Viktor, and Lord Markus, are all deceased. Lady Amelia was assassinated alongside the Vampire Council by the Lycans. Lord Viktor was killed by Selene after she discovered he had murdered her family long ago. Lord Markus, the first Vampire, was also killed by Selene to stop him and his rampaging brother William, the first Werewolf. After many years, the leadership and organization of the Vampire Nation is once again restored following the ascension of Selene, David, and Lena as the new Vampire Elders.

In the post-production of the film, the pallor of the Vampires was achieved via D.I. As explained by Selene in the first Underworld film, a bite from both a Lycan and a Vampire is lethal, but Michael's bloodline allows him to survive and metamorphose into a hybrid of both species.

Death Dealers are Vampires that are specifically trained and tasked to kill Lycans.

=== Selene ===
Selene appears in the films Underworld, Underworld: Evolution, Underworld: Awakening, and Underworld: Blood Wars as the main protagonist; as well as in Underworld: Rise of the Lycans for a brief cameo. Her lover is Michael Corvin, and together they have a daughter, named Eve. Selene is portrayed by Kate Beckinsale, and by Beckinsale's daughter, Lily Mo Sheen, in Underworld: Evolution in flashback scenes as a child. Selene was created by Kevin Grevioux, Len Wiseman, and Danny McBride. According to Kevin Grevioux, Selene is based loosely on the Marvel Comics character of the same name. After the events of Evolution, Selene is no longer merely a Vampire but a Vampire/Corvinus-Strain Hybrid, now more powerful and also immune to UV radiation. At the end of Underworld: Blood Wars, Selene is not only accepted once again by the Vampire Covens but also named a new Vampire Elder alongside David and Lena.

In the non-canon novel, Underworld: Blood Enemy, Selene is also the main protagonist.

=== Viktor ===
Viktor is a Vampire Elder, and the main antagonist in Underworld and Underworld: Rise of the Lycans. He is portrayed by Bill Nighy. Viktor is a Hungarian general and warlord born sometime in the 4th or early 5th century. As he is nearing the end of his life, Markus Corvinus, the first true Vampire, offers immortality in exchange for Viktor's military expertise and army in fighting against the Werewolves, spawn of Markus's twin brother, William. When Markus metamorphoses Viktor, the general becomes a vampire Elder. The Death Dealers are created from Viktor's army. Viktor is a ruthless vampire Elder and, with armies loyal to him, he overthrows the original Vampire Markus and sets himself up in Vampire myth as the first Vampire. Viktor is the most powerful Vampire ever to have lived mostly because his manipulation, experience, and cunning far surpass the other Elders'. He is killed by Selene, who cuts his head in half with his own sword. In Blood Wars, Selene is hunted by the Vampires for killing Viktor. Selene's only two allies are Thomas, who has no love for Viktor, and his son David, whose mother is secretly Viktor's fellow Elder Amelia. Due to the threat of the new Lycan leader Marius, the Vampire Council agrees to pardon Selene for Viktor's death if she will train their new Death Dealers, but Semira, an old favorite of Viktor, frames Selene for murder to get revenge. Following the deaths of Marius and Semira, the Vampires' grudge against Selene for killing Viktor ends, and she goes from pariah to one of the three new Vampire Elders alongside Amelia's son David and the Nordic Vampire Lena.

=== Sonja ===
Sonja is the daughter of the Vampire Elder Viktor, introduced by flashback in Underworld and portrayed by Jázmin Dammak. The character is heavily featured in Underworld: Rise of the Lycans, and is portrayed by Rhona Mitra. She fell in love with the Lycan slave Lucian despite knowing her father would disapprove. Without Viktor's knowledge or blessing, she eventually married Lucian in secret and became pregnant with his child. For breaking the Covenant, Viktor executed her and her unborn child by exposure to sunlight, and her husband was forced to watch. Viktor viewed the child as an abomination and was acting to protect the Vampire line's purity, although Sonja's death haunted him for the rest of his life. His guilt over this led him to spare Selene, who bore an uncanny resemblance to Sonja, from the slaughter of the rest of her family. Sonja wore a pendant, which was given to her by her father. After her death, Lucian took that pendant as a keepsake of his beloved wife. This pendant proved to be vitally important to the events that unfolded in Underworld: Evolution. Her death started the war between Vampires and Lycans that lasted for centuries afterward.

=== Markus Corvinus ===
Markus Corvinus is the first Vampire in the Underworld series, and the main antagonist of Underworld: Evolution. He is portrayed by Tony Curran. Markus also appears in the novelization of the sequel. Born sometime in the 5th century; Markus was one of three sons of Helena and Alexander Corvinus, the first immortal. Markus was also the twin brother of William Corvinus, and they each inherited the immortality strain in its active form from their father. Together, Markus and William both shared a bond as twins that Alexander never truly saw. Markus was later bitten by a bat, thus making him the progenitor of what would become the Vampire species. His twin, William, was bitten by a wolf and went on to ravage the countryside of Hungary, infecting the populace with his highly infectious Lycanthropy virus. In order to combat the growing Werewolf threat, Markus approached Viktor, a dying warlord, to utilize his military genius and army (who became the Death Dealers) in exchange for immortality. Viktor accepted and became one of the Vampire Elders. After being revived by the blood of the Lycan Singe, Markus awakens as a Hybrid and goes on a rampage to rescue William, aiming to metamorphose him into a Hybrid as well. He murders his own father and apparently his distant relative Michael Corvin, but he is ultimately killed by an enhanced Selene in a final fight when she stabs him through the head with one of his own wing talons and knocks him into spinning helicopter blades, dismembering him.

=== Amelia ===
Amelia is one of the three Vampire Elders of the Vampire Nation in the Underworld series. She appeared briefly in Underworld, appeared in a flashback sequence in Underworld: Evolution, and appears in archive footage and as a painting in Underworld: Blood Wars. She is portrayed by Zita Görög. Amelia was the youngest of all three Elders as well as the only female. She was elevated to the rank of an Elder, both in order to help control the chaos created by Markus's brother William (the first werewolf; William was unable to return to human form after his metamorphosis and his bite caused even the dead to metamorphose into werewolves) and to perform the role as a tie-breaker between her fellow Elders Markus and Viktor if there was ever a deadlock in the ruling of the coven. Ultimately, Amelia did not keep control during her reign, allowing Viktor's regent Kraven to conspire with Lucian and Lucian to work deals with Tanis for weapons to kill Vampires. She herself was killed and "bled dry" by Lycans led by Raze during an attack on her train. During the event of Blood Wars, David discovers that Amelia was his mother and thus her heir as the new leader of the Eastern Coven.

=== Erika ===
Erika is portrayed by Sophia Myles. She is a character in the first two films of the Underworld film series as well as in the novelization of the first film. She is a Vampire seductress, a social-climbing courtier in Viktor's mansion, obsessed with rising through the ranks of the vampire aristocracy. She is a high-ranking maid who most recently began seeking the attentions of Kraven, as well as having a one-sided rivalry with Selene.

=== Kraven ===
Kraven is portrayed by actor Shane Brolly. He is a vain man with a highly inflated-but-extremely-fragile narcissistic ego. He is a long-time suitor of Selene, a Death Dealer, and fancies himself in a relationship with her even though she spurns him at every turn. Yet Kraven is so obsessed with Selene that the more she refuses him, the more he wants her. When it becomes evident that Selene has fallen in love with Michael Corvin, Kraven becomes insanely jealous and highly irrational, demanding Michael's head, and even shooting Michael multiple times with silver nitrate bullets, nearly killing him. However, Selene revives Michael in the nick of time by biting him, thus turning him into a Hybrid.

In his quest for power, Kraven enters into a secret alliance with Lucian in order to overthrow the Elders, helping to set up an ambush for the Lady Amelia. After Lady Amelia's death, and with Lucian and Viktor dead, Kraven goes after a slumbering Markus and tries to murder him in his sleep. However, Markus surprisingly wakes as a Hybrid and massacres Kraven's men. Markus then bites Kraven and obtains his blood memories. Although Markus stops before Kraven dies of blood loss, he turns down Kraven's offer to 'assist' him, seeing Kraven as untrustworthy. Immediately after that, Markus kills Kraven by crushing his head with his wings.

=== Andreas Tanis ===
Andreas Tanis is a character in the 2006 movie Underworld: Evolution and in the 2009 movie Underworld: Rise of the Lycans. He is portrayed by Steven Mackintosh. Tanis is a Vampire of considerable age (estimated at over 1000 years old at the time of his death), he was at one point the official scribe and Historian of the Old World Coven. An ambitious man, Tanis knew things about other Vampires and kept the things he knew secret until it was of use to him. Coveting a rise in status to a member of the Vampire Council, Tanis enters into a covert alliance with Sonja and Lucian, aiding them in exchange for his silence and Sonja's seat on the council; his part in Sonja's and Lucian's plan remained a secret after Sonja's execution and later after Lucian's faked death. However, over 300 years prior to the events that occurred in the first and second installments, the Vampire Elder, Lord Viktor, in his bid to rewrite history, turns on Tanis and orders his banishment, citing that Tanis had been recording "malicious lies". The order of banishment was carried out by Selene, who escorted him to an abandoned monastery on Viktor's orders. Over three hundred years later, Selene would learn the truth about Viktor and realize that what Tanis had recorded years earlier was, in fact, true. Tanis is later killed by Markus after being drained of blood.

=== Soren ===
Soren, having a surprising lack of personal ambition for a Vampire, was Kraven's janissary, played by Scott McElroy. Soren appears predominantly in the first film installment of Underworld, but he is also referenced in the novelization of the sequel and appears in the comic book prequel as well. Not much is revealed about Soren's past; rumors surrounding him say that he is almost as old as Viktor himself (and was probably bitten by the Vampire Elder). Soren was originally Viktor's bodyguard, a position he may have held since before either were Vampires. Later, he served as the head torturer in Viktor's employ. He proved to be very skilled in taming Lycan slaves with silver-edged whips, and he even used them on Lucian at Viktor's request prior to Sonja's execution.

In the non-canon novel, Underworld: Blood Enemy, Soren lost his position in Viktor's good graces after he left Viktor's daughter Sonja, whom he was charged to protect, alone during an ambush by mortals who were hateful of Vampires. He also remained ignorant of the fact that Sonja was in love with the Lycan Lucian until he was informed by a Lycan woman who had been obsessed with Lucian and resented him falling for Sonja. Soren informed Viktor, who then executed his daughter. Viktor blamed Soren for not protecting her.

Soren is one of the Vampires involved in Viktor's assault on the Lycan base in the first film, and he ultimately faces Raze in single combat. Soren initially holds the Lycan off, but after Raze shapeshifts into full Lycan form, he tackles Soren and apparently kills him, since Soren is not seen afterward and Raze is.

=== David ===
David is a character from the 2012 movie Underworld: Awakening and the 2016 movie Underworld: Blood Wars. He is portrayed by Theo James. He is the son of Thomas, leader of the Western Coven, and Amelia, the Vampire Elder. Although never trained as a Death Dealer and, in contrast with his father, Thomas, David is not a coward and fights when situations demand it. Fascinated by Selene's past as a Death Dealer, he brings her back to the Vampire Coven with her hybrid daughter, Eve, hoping she would teach some of the members so that they could become what she used to be, as there are not any left within the coven. David dies after a raid by Lycans led by Quint Lane, but he is revived by Selene using her Vampire-Corvinus Strain Hybrid blood, metamorphosing him into a Vampire-Corvinus Strain Hybrid too. During the final assault on Antigen, David, now with similar abilities to Selene, including sunlight immunity, arrives to help unexpectedly. Armed with a shotgun and two blades, David distracts Jacob Lane long enough for Eve to break free and fight back. As more Lycan guards arrive, David turns his focus to them and single-handedly kills around a dozen Lycans. After the battle, David joins Selene and Eve in searching for Michael Corvin who has escaped. In Underworld: Blood Wars, David attempts to get Selene to return to aid the Vampire Covens against the new Lycan leader, Marius. His resurrection has become something of a legend amongst the Vampires as he is the first Vampire to have ever been brought back from the dead. His fighting skills also have been honed and he is now a capable combatant. After Semira betrays them, David and his father rescued Selene, but Thomas is killed after telling David to take Selene to the Nordic Coven. David is able to use his sunlight immunity to escape Semira's clutches and learns from the Nordic Coven that he is the son of the Vampire Elder Amelia and thus her rightful heir. During the Lycan attack on the Nordic Coven, David helps defend it and is devastated by Selene's apparent death. David then returns to the Eastern Coven and interrupts a coup attempt by Semira by presenting himself as the heir of Amelia with some of her blood to prove it. The Death Dealers and Vampire Council side with David and he leads a futile defense against a massive Lycan attack before a revived and enhanced Selene arrives with the Nordic Coven to help. David and Semira, who has metamorphosed into a Vampire-Corvinus Strain Hybrid herself by drinking Selene's blood, fight ending with David raising the shutters keeping out the sunlight. David is able to use Semira's distraction over her new sunlight immunity to kill her and after discovering that Selene has killed Marius, cuts off Marius' head and uses it to get the Lycans to retreat. Following the battle, David is made one of the new Vampire Elders alongside Selene and Nordic Vampire Lena.

=== Thomas ===
Thomas is one of the surviving Vampire Elders in Underworld: Awakening and the father of David. According to David, his father was once a Vampire who had "defended [his coven] with fire and steel, rather than hollow words", and that Selene reminds Thomas of the way he once was. He does not trust Selene and openly discriminates against her daughter, Eve, who is a Hybrid. In contrast with his son, Thomas is a coward and ordered the coven to flee rather than fight, leaving David as the de facto leader because of his demonstration of courage and intelligence, despite Thomas's status now as a Coven Elder. His arrogance made him fail to realize the necessity of Selene's presence or what she has metamorphosed into until she used her blood to resurrect David after he died from the critical injuries he received from Lycans. In Underworld: Blood Wars, Thomas is approached by Semira to petition the Vampire Council to grant Selene clemency in exchange for her help in training their Death Dealers. Thomas is successful, but Semira later frames Selene for murder and kidnaps her. Thomas helps David rescue Selene and orders his son to take Selene to the Nordic Coven. Thomas then battles both Semira and Varga before Semira kills him with a stab to the back of his head while he's distracted. Upon arrival at the Nordic Coven, David learns that Thomas once had a relationship with the Vampire Elder Amelia and he is their son as proven by blood memories left behind for him by Amelia. He is portrayed by Charles Dance.

=== Lena ===
Lena is a vampire warrior from the Nordic Coven. As a daughter of the coven's leader, Vidar, she is depicted as a calm and wise Vampiress, but she is willing to use violence to protect her coven. She provides Selene with the cocooning process, thus not only reviving her but also boosting her hybrid abilities to new heights. At the end of Blood Wars, Lena becomes one of three new Vampire Elders alongside Selene and David. She is portrayed by Clementine Nicholson.

=== Semira ===
Semira is one of the leaders of the Eastern Coven. She is a fiercely ambitious Vampiress in Underworld: Blood Wars. She is also skilled at sword fighting. In Blood Wars, Semira gets the Vampire Council to grant Selene clemency in exchange for her training their new Death Dealers, but it is in fact a trap so that Semira can get Selene's blood and kill her in revenge for the death of the Vampire Elder Viktor who Semira had once been close to. Selene is rescued by David and Thomas, the latter of whom Semira murders, but Semira is able to get some of Selene's blood and learns of Selene's and David's ability to walk in sunlight. Semira later sends Alexia to the Nordic Coven, knowing she is really the lover of the new Lycan leader Marius, and kills her upon her return. Using Selene's blood, Semira is able to metamorphose herself into a Vampire-Corvinus Strain Hybrid like Selene and David and attempts to overthrow the Vampire Council. However, David returns and reveals himself to be the son of the Vampire Elder Amelia and thus her rightful heir and the true leader of the Eastern Coven. At this revelation, Semira's own Death Dealers turn on her, including her lover Varga, and she is arrested. Semira manages to escape when the Lycans attack the Coven and battles David, being an even match for him with her new powers and proficient fighting skills. Finally, David opens the shutters to Semira's office and lets in the sunlight, causing Semira to get distracted by enjoying her new sunlight immunity as David intended. With Semira distracted, David stabs her through the back of the head and out of her mouth with a sword, killing her in the same manner she murdered his father, Thomas. She is portrayed by Lara Pulver.

== Lycans ==
Werewolves in the Underworld films, like their Vampire counterparts, are biologically immortal transgenics. Lycans display a number of greatly enhanced physical attributes in either form (superhuman strength, speed, reflexes, healing, etc.) although the Werewolf form is physically superior to both their Human form and even to most Vampires. Lycans are highly allergic to silver to the point of it being toxic and lethal to them, and it is even able to keep them weakened and unable to metamorphose into their Werewolf form. They can also be killed or permanently damaged by extreme physical trauma as normal humans are, such as mutilation, a broken neck, or dismemberment, especially if their head or heart is destroyed or removed. However, while first-generation werewolves sired by William Corvinus are permanently metamorphosed and feral, second-generation werewolves, the Lycans, and those they convert, can become able to metamorphose between their Human or Werewolf forms at will and retain their personalities while metamorphosed. Their control over their metamorphoses increases over time, to the point where they can partially metamorphose to physically enhance themselves further, while age also gives them a limited tolerance to silver. As explained by Selene in the first Underworld film, though, a bite from both a Lycan and a Vampire is lethal, but Michael's heritage allows him to survive and metamorphose into a hybrid of both species.

Originally, Lycans were seen as a lesser race and were enslaved by the Vampiric race. This was until the catalyst of Lucian's and Sonja's star-crossed love, where the Lycans rebelled for their freedom and revenge.

=== Lucian ===
Lucian is the very first of the second-generation Lycans. He is the leader of the Lycan horde in the movie Underworld and appears in its prequel Underworld: Rise of the Lycans. He is portrayed by actor Michael Sheen. Lucian is born the son of a captured female Werewolf, who is killed when Lucian is a newborn. He is branded with Viktor's mark signifying that he is put into slavery under one of Viktor's early reigns as a blacksmith. Being born of two Werewolves, he is a pure-blood Lycan. Lucian is a Lycan servant to Viktor's clan. His relationship with Sonja begins when they grew up and it is eventually revealed that Sonja is pregnant with his child, making their child a Lycan-Vampire hybrid; but Sonja is executed, preventing the birth of the child. He starts a war with Viktor as a result and fakes his own death with the help of Kraven, planning to metamorphose into a Hybrid in order to kill Viktor. His plan fails, but he holds Kraven off long enough for Selene to metamorphose Michael Corvin into a Hybrid. Selene also later kills Viktor to fulfill her own revenge against him. Despite his plans to metamorphose into a hybrid and to kill Viktor himself having failed, his will is seen through regardless with Michael's metamorphosing and Viktor's death.

=== Raze ===
Razahir "Raze" Khemse is a Lycan who is the right-hand man of the Lycan leader Lucian. He is born in Sudan in East Africa during the 14th century. Raze is the son of a powerful Sultan but his family's lands are taken during a period of wars that spread into Africa. He is forced into slavery and taken to Hungary to be given as payment to Viktor the Vampire Elder. He joins Lucian's civil war and kills Soren during the Vampires' attack on Lucian's base, but after believing Lucian to be dead, he launches a suicide attack on Viktor, who snaps his neck and stabs him with a sword. He is played by Kevin Grevioux.

=== Singe ===
Singe is a scientist Turned and employed by Lucian to find a way to mix the vampire and werewolf bloodlines to create hybrids. He kidnaps members of the human Corvinus bloodline and mixes their blood with both Vampire and Lycan blood to see if they are compatible. He finally finds compatibility in Michael Corvin when Michael is captured and brought to him to be tested. He's killed by Viktor towards the end of Underworld, and his blood seeps into Markus's tomb and awakens him. Singe wasn't shown to metamorph into his werewolf form. He is played by Erwin Leder.

=== William Corvinus ===
William Corvinus is the first and only Lycan Elder. Portrayed only in his metamorphosed state, he is played by Brian Steele, but prior to his being a werewolf, he would have been identical in looks to his twin brother Markus. Born sometime in the 5th century, William is one of three sons of Helena and Alexander Corvinus, the first immortal. He, along with Markus, inherits the immortality strain in its active form from their father. Markus and William both share a bond as twins that Alexander never truly sees. William is later bitten by a wolf, thus making him the progenitor of what becomes the Lycan species (his twin, Markus, is bitten by a bat). Unlike most later Lycans, his fur is white. William is unable to metamorphose back into his human form and has little more than ferocious savagery, nor is he ever shown in his human form in any of the films. His Lycanthropy virus is much more potent than Markus's Vampire virus, even allowing dead victims to metamorphose. William goes on to ravage the countryside of Hungary, infecting the population with his highly infectious Lycanthropy virus. In order to combat the growing Lycan threat, Markus approaches Viktor, a dying warlord, to utilize his military genius and army (who become the Death Dealers) in exchange for immortality. Later, William is successfully captured and contained by the combined forces of Markus, Amelia, and Viktor and used by Viktor to keep Markus in line. After Viktor is killed, Markus releases William, hoping to metamorphose him into a Hybrid and restore his morality. Despite his bestial nature, William is shown to recognize his brother. In the fight that follows, Michael Corvin rips William's head in half with brute strength, killing him.

=== Dr. Jacob Lane ===
Dr. Jacob Lane is a ruthless and amoral Lycan, and the main antagonist of Underworld: Awakening. He betrays his own pack and reveals the existences of both vampire and lycan races so he can covertly experiment on both in order to create a new and powerful Lycan race by heading the research company Antigen, in hope of domination over the Human, Vampire, and Werewolf races. Using the blood of the Hybrid Eve, he enhances his own Lycan form, but not to the same degree as his son Quint. During Selene's attack on Antigen, he battles Detective Sebastian and Eve and is killed when Eve rips out his throat. He is portrayed by Stephen Rea.

=== Quint Lane ===
Quint Lane is the son of Dr. Jacob Lane, who is as corrupt as his father. After the public discovers him as a Lycan, his father helps to fake his death in order to continue his experiments on him. He metamorphoses into a larger, fearsome, and powerful Lycan, has the ability to rapidly heal, is seemingly immune to silver, and is sometimes called a "Super-Lycan". He is killed by Selene, who stuffs a silver nitrate grenade into an open wound on his abdomen, which quickly heals, preventing him from removing the grenade before it explodes; revealing his so-called "immunity to silver" to be actually only skin-deep, and his vital organs to be very much still vulnerable. He is portrayed by Kris Holden-Ried.

=== Marius ===
Marius is a Lycan leader who rose to power following the destruction of Antigen, becoming the main antagonist of Underworld: Blood Wars. Marius, who is described as being unlike any Lycan leader ever before, manages to gather an army of Lycans loyal to him that slaughters several Vampire Covens using superior tactics. Marius also captures and murders Michael Corvin, using vials of Michael's blood to increase his own power and metamorphose himself into a Hybrid. The threat posed by Marius is so great that the Vampire Council agrees to pardon Selene if she trains their Death Dealers to fight him, but she is betrayed by Semira and Varga and sent on the run. After being informed of Selene's location by his Vampire lover Alexia, Marius leads an attack on the Nordic Coven, his new Hybrid powers proving superior to Selene's. Marius attempts to get the location of Eve from Selene to use her blood to solidify his power and is horrified to learn that Selene truly does not know where she is. After Selene's apparent suicide, Marius calls off the Lycan attack on the Nordic Coven and sends Alexia to lower the defenses of the Eastern Coven so he can attack. Marius leads a devastating attack on the Eastern Coven and comes close to winning before Selene, her powers enhanced by the Nordic Coven, arrives to help accompanied by the Nordic Coven. Marius battles Selene who learns from his blood memories of Marius murdering Michael. Downing the last of Michael's blood, Marius metamorphoses and battles Selene inside a cage. Using her newly enhanced speed, Selene is able to get behind Marius before he can react and rip out Marius's spine, killing him. David then cuts off Marius's head and uses it to convince the other Lycans that their leader is dead and get them to retreat. He is portrayed by Tobias Menzies.

== House of Corvinus ==
=== Alexander Corvinus ===
Alexander Corvinus (Hungarian: Corvin Sándor) is the first true Immortal in the Underworld movies and is the father of Markus Corvinus and William Corvinus, as well as an ancestor of Michael Corvin, who is a descendant of Corvinus's third and mortal son. He is portrayed by Derek Jacobi.

Alexander was a Hungarian warlord who lived in the early 5th century. He ascended to power just in time to watch his village ravaged by an unknown plague. Alexander was the only survivor of the plague. In an unusual Immune response, his body was able to adapt the virus, and, likewise be adapted by it, and through some unknown means consequently made him immortal. The plague that wiped-out his home town and mutated with Alexander may have been a part of the first wave of the Bubonic plague to hit Europe (otherwise known as the "Plague of Justinian"), although the timing for the Justinian Plague is off by a nigh-century (although archaeo-pathological evidence reveals that Bubonic plague had been around as early as the Bronze Age), and that Bubonic plague is bacterial rather than viral.

Years later, with his wife Helena, he fathered three children, two of whom inherited the immortal strain in its active form: twin brothers Markus and William. Markus was bitten by a bat and metamorphosed into the first vampire. William was bitten by a rabid wolf and metamorphosed into the first werewolf. William became a savage beast that was unable to ever assume human form again, something Alexander attributed to his uncontrollable rage. Only Alexander's third son (who inherited the immortal strain in its inactive form) remained a human. Markus and his vampire army (led by Viktor) captured his brother William and locked him in a secret prison for over 800 years, the location of which was kept from Markus. When Viktor ordered his vampire daughter executed for having been impregnated by a Lycan, he inadvertently touched off a centuries-long war between lycans and vampires. Alexander chose to keep the war contained from ever spilling into the mortal realm. He hired humans to clean up after the battles and to help conceal their existence from the normal human population. Alexander states in Underworld: Evolution that he believes he and his sons were oddities of nature, and that the world is not theirs to conquer but belongs to the humans. Despite not displaying any powers of his own, he is referred to by Selene as the strongest of the immortals and the only one capable of killing his sons, indicating he does possess some abilities.

At the time of Underworld: Evolution, Alexander was operating under the alias of Lorenz Macaro, and ran his operation from the ship "Sancta Helena". He meets with Selene and Michael, who ask for his help to destroy Markus and William. He reveals that no matter what they have become, he cannot help Selene and Michael against them, for they are his own sons. Alexander has come into possession of Viktor's body (and Viktor's half of the prison key that holds William Corvinus). Alexander is visited by Markus, who impales him with his wing talon, takes Viktor's half of the key and leaves him for dead.

As Alexander lays dying, he calls Selene to him to drink some of his pure immortal blood. The blood, he tells her, will make her "the future" and is her only hope of being strong enough to destroy the Corvinus brothers. After Selene and Michael leave, Alexander detonates a case of explosives on his ship, obliterating it in the harbor, along with killing himself. His blood enhances Selene's powers, making her equal to the Hybrid Markus in strength and giving her an immunity to sunlight, ultimately allowing her to defeat him. She tells Detective Sebastian in Underworld: Awakening about getting her sunlight immunity from Alexander, referring to it as a gift from him. Detective Sebastian displays knowledge of who Alexander is when Selene brings him up. Without Alexander and his Cleaners to hide the truth of immortals from the world, the result makes the human race aware of the immortals and they launch a war to eradicate both species.

=== Michael Corvin ===
Michael Corvin (in Hungarian: Corvin Mihály) is a Hungarian-American medical student who is a direct descendant of Alexander Corvinus. He is portrayed by Scott Speedman in the first two films and appears in cameo appearances in Underworld: Awakening and Underworld: Blood Wars by Trent Garrett. Bitten first by Lucian and later by Selene, he metamorphosed into a Lycan/Vampire Hybrid. Being a hybrid, Michael can regenerate cells and muscle tissues as well as internal organs even when he is dead, as long as his body stays intact: such as when Markus killed him by impaling him through the chest. Counting the unborn child of Lucian and Sonja, Michael is the second Lycan/Vampire Hybrid. In the beginning Awakening, he was captured along with Selene by the Lycan-run corporation Antigen, being labeled "Subject 0". By the end of the film, he seemingly escaped from stasis with his current whereabouts being unknown. However, it is revealed in Blood Wars that Michael was abducted by Marius, who then killed him and stole his blood in order to become stronger. He also plays a role in the third part of the animated shorts in Underworld: Endless War voiced by Mark Oliver.

=== Eve ===
Eve is the hybrid daughter of Selene and Michael Corvin, through whom she is a descendant of Alexander Corvinus. In Underworld: Awakening, she tells Selene that her name is Subject 2. She was born without her parents' knowledge during their years of captivity in Antigen. The scientists in the facility told her that her mother was dead and never heard anything about her father. Eve eventually discovered Selene's body and breaks her mother out of cryo-suspension. After her escape, Selene discovers Eve and learns that she is her daughter, realizing that she had been pregnant at the time of her capture, and given birth to Eve all during her unconscious state. Being pursued by both humans and Lycans because of her unique origin, and despite Selene's attempts to shield her from the dangers around them, she is recaptured by Antigen, but is rescued by Selene and Detective Sebastian during an attack on the facility. Eve joins the fight herself and kills Doctor Lane. In Underworld: Blood Wars, Eve has gone away to prevent any vampires and lycans from getting her blood. As a result, Selene does not know where Eve is. However, she appears in the very last shot of the film, revealing that she has been following her mother; as her mother is now one of the Vampire Nation's new Elders, this makes Eve an heir to her mother and to the Vampire Nation. Eve is portrayed by India Eisley.

== Humans ==
=== Detective Sebastian ===
Portrayed by Michael Ealy, Detective Sebastian is a police detective in Underworld: Awakening who is shown to be sympathetic to immortals. He is first seen investigating a Lycan attack where he convinces his rookie partner to not jump to conclusions. While at the crime scene, he gets a brief glimpse of Selene and grows suspicious of Antigen, especially after he finds proof that they lied about their test subject, Selene, being dead. After an attack on a vampire coven that ends with her daughter being kidnapped, Selene confronts Detective Sebastian who admits he suspected the Lycans are not extinct. He then shows her reports a friend of his sent him shortly before dying of over 200 suspected Lycans being tested and all coming back negative, leading Detective Sebastian to think someone might be protecting them and letting them rebuild. Selene realizes that Antigen is run by Lycans and Detective Sebastian offers her his help in rescuing her daughter, explaining that his wife had metamorphosed into a vampiress and committed suicide to protect him. During the assault on Antigen, Detective Sebastian mans the security station to guide Selene through the building and races to the parking garage when he realizes Selene will not get there in time to stop Doctor Lane from escaping. In the fight that follows, Detective Sebastian kills a few Lycans but is unable to harm Lane who is now a Hybrid. He watches as Eve fights and kills Lane and David arrives to dispatch the other Lycans. As the police arrive, Detective Sebastian, who has an injured leg, tells the other three to go and he will misdirect the police to buy them time to get away.
