= Zita Görög =

Hungarian actress and model

- Born: 27 September 1979 (age 47); Nagybátony, Nógrád County, Hungarian People's Republic (now Hungary)
- Education: Brody Imre Gimnazium, Budapest
- Occupations: Actress; model
- Spouse: Attila Seres
- Children: 2

Zita Görög (Hungarian: Görög Zita; born 27 September 1979) is a Hungarian actress and model, often credited as Zita Gorog.

== Life and career ==
Görög was born in Nagybátony, Hungary. She specialized in drama at the Brody Imre Gimnazium in Budapest. She started modeling when she was 18; first job was an agnès b. fashion show in Paris with fellow model Laetitia Casta. She has since participated in campaigns for Mont Blanc, Benetton, Vodafone, Nivea, Coppertone and Nissan. She has also been featured in magazines such as Playboy, Maxima, and several others.

Görög was the host of the weekly TV-shows Cinematrix and Megasztár (Pop-Idol), the most viewed Hungarian talent show. Her film roles include parts in Den Of Lions, Café In The Sky, and several Hungarian movies. She is perhaps best known outside of Hungary for her brief appearances as the vampire elder Amelia in the films Underworld, Underworld: Evolution and Underworld: Blood Wars.

In a reported article it is known that Zita Görög divorced from her husband Attila Seres and it was known that he was gone for months citing the end of their relationship. However, in a news article on 9 July 2012 it was discovered that Zita Görög is in a 'nascent' relationship with a man named Imre Rakonczai who is a former band member of the teen pop band called V.I.P.

In 2015, a Hungarian magazine group called HOT! Magazin posted on their Facebook page that Zita Görög has wed a man named Tamás Koltai. Reports stated that she was proposed repeatedly, before she said "yes". The former Idol co-host and former press officer of TV2's name came to light in June. It was also reported that they have been together for some time, and were looking to settle down for a long healthy relationship not as a 'dating' couple, but as a married couple. What transpired between now and then, between the two; of the wedding-details and such is kept privately between the newlywed couple.

== Selected filmography ==
| Year | Movie | Role |
|---|---|---|
| 2002 | Cinematrix | Host |
| 2002 | Szerelem utolsó vérig | debut's role |
| 2003 | Den of Lions | Nico |
| 2003 | Underworld | Amelia |
| 2004 | A Cafe in the Sky | Helena Seress |
| 2005 | Fej vagy írás | Mariann |
| 2005 | 8mm 2 | Risa |
| 2005 | Szöke kóla | Lulu |
| 2006 | Underworld: Evolution | Amelia |
| 2006 | A Xafe in the Sky | Helena Seress |
| 2016 | Underworld: Blood Wars | Amelia (archived footage) |
