= Tom Rosenberg =

American film producer

- Born: 1947 or 1948 (age 78–79)
- Education: B.A. University of Wisconsin at Madison; J.D. University of California at Berkeley Law School
- Occupation: Film producer
- Known for: co-founder of Beacon Pictures founder of Lakeshore Entertainment

Tom B. Rosenberg (born 1947/1948) is an American film producer, co-founder of Beacon Pictures; and founder and chairman of Lakeshore Entertainment. He is a recipient of the 2004 Academy Award for Best Picture for the film Million Dollar Baby.

== Biography ==
Rosenberg grew up on the North Side of Chicago. His father was an alderman of the 44th ward and later served as a Cook County judge. His mother worked in a dress shop and died when Rosenberg was 15. He had one sister who was 15 years his senior. He graduated from Lake View High School and then graduated from the University of Wisconsin at Madison. He then went on to teach at public schools in Chicago and then move to California where he went to the University of California at Berkeley Law School. He then moved to Willow Springs, Missouri where he worked as a lawyer, sold real estate, and helped to build subsidized housing for the elderly. After five years and newly divorced, he moved back to Chicago founded Capital Associates in 1977 with a partner. They built their first development in Decatur, Illinois. Rosenberg went on to build 54 buildings in Illinois, oversaw the largest school construction program in Chicago, and was active in fundraising for mayors Jane Byrne and Richard M. Daley. In 1984, he ran the Midwestern campaign for presidential candidate Walter Mondale. In 1989, he started a film company, Beacon Pictures, with his friend Armyan Bernstein; and their first film was released in 1991, The Commitments, directed by Alan Parker. He left Beacon in 1994 to form Lakeshore Entertainment.

In 2004, he sold his real estate assets.

== Filmography ==
He was a producer in all films unless otherwise noted.

=== Film ===
Year	Film	Credit	Notes
1991	The Commitments	Executive producer	
1992	A Midnight Clear	Executive producer	
1993	Sugar Hill	Executive producer	
1994	Princess Caraboo	Executive producer	
1994	The Road to Wellville	Executive producer	
1996	Kids in the Hall: Brain Candy	Executive producer	
1996	Box of Moonlight	Executive producer	
1997	Going All the Way	Executive producer	
1997	'Til There Was You		
1997	Prince Valiant	Executive producer	
1997	The Real Blonde		
1998	Polish Wedding		
1998	Homegrown	Executive producer	
1998	Phoenix	Executive producer	
1999	200 Cigarettes	Executive producer	
1999	Arlington Road	Executive producer	
1999	Runaway Bride		
1999	The Hurricane	Executive producer	
2000	Passion of Mind		
2000	The Next Best Thing		
2000	Autumn in New York		
2000	The Gift		
2002	The Mothman Prophecies		
2003	The Human Stain		
2003	Underworld		
2003	Singing Behind Screens		
2004	Wicker Park		
2004	Madhouse	Executive producer	
2004	Suspect Zero	Executive producer	
2004	Million Dollar Baby		
2005	Undiscovered		
2005	The Cave		
2005	The Exorcism of Emily Rose		
2005	Æon Flux	Executive producer	
2006	Underworld: Evolution		
2006	She's the Man	Executive producer	
2006	Crank		
2006	The Covenant		
2006	The Last Kiss		
2006	The Dead Girl		
2007	Blood & Chocolate		
2007	Feast of Love		
2008	Henry Poole Is Here		
2008	Untraceable		
2008	Elegy		
2008	Pathology		
2008	The Midnight Meat Train		
2009	Underworld: Rise of the Lycans		
2009	Crank: High Voltage		
2009	The Ugly Truth		
2009	Gamer		
2009	Fame		
2011	The Lincoln Lawyer		
2011	Underworld: Endless War		Direct-to-video
2012	Underworld: Awakening		
2012	One for the Money		
2012	Gone		
2012	Stand Up Guys		
2014	I, Frankenstein		
2014	Walk of Shame		
2015	The Age of Adaline		
2015	The Vatican Tapes		
2016	The Boy		
2016	American Pastoral		
2016	Underworld: Blood Wars		
2018	Adrift	Executive producer	
2018	A.X.L.		
2018	Peppermint		
2020	Brahms: The Boy II		

=== Television ===
Year	Title	Credit
2018	Heathers	Executive producer

Thanks

Year	Title	Role	Notes
1990	The Earth Day Special	Special thanks	Television special
