= Lakeshore Entertainment =

Film production company

Lakeshore Entertainment, LLC
- Formerly: Lakeshore Entertainment Group (1994–2020)
- Type: Private
- Industry: Entertainment
- Founded: 1994; 32 years ago
- Founders: Tom Rosenberg; Ted Tannebaum
- Defunct: 2020; 6 years ago
- Fate: Shut down; library sold to Vine Alternative Investments
- Successor: Vine Alternative Investments
- Headquarters: Beverly Hills, California, United States
- Products: Motion pictures
- Owner: Vine Alternative Investments (2019–2024); Shamrock Capital (2024–present)
- Divisions: Lakeshore Television; Lakeshore Records; Lakeshore International
- Subsidiaries: Off the Dock (2015–18)

Lakeshore Entertainment, LLC was an American independent film production, finance, international sales, and distribution company founded in 1994 by Tom Rosenberg and Ted Tannebaum, after Rosenberg sold a stake in Beacon Communications. Lakeshore Entertainment is headquartered in Beverly Hills, California.

The company produced over 60 films, including the Academy Award-winning Million Dollar Baby (2004). Sigurjón Sighvatsson was the company's first president and served from its founding until 1998. He was replaced by producer Gary Lucchesi.

In 2013, Lakeshore launched a television division, and in 2015, they launched a digital studio, Off the Dock, that targets the YouTube demographic. The company also had a record label division, Lakeshore Records.

In March 2019, Lakeshore placed its film library up for sale. The library includes 300 titles, such as the New World Pictures library (which Lakeshore acquired in 1996). In October 2019, Lakeshore sold its library and international operation to Vine Alternative Investments for roughly $200 million.

In July 2024, Vine Alternative Investments sold their portfolio (excluding Village Roadshow Entertainment Group and EuropaCorp) to Shamrock Capital.

== Selected filmography ==
=== 1990s ===
- Bandwagon (1996)
- Box of Moonlight (1996)
- Kids in the Hall: Brain Candy (1996)
- Going All the Way (1997)
- 'Til There Was You (1997)
- Murder in Mind (1997)
- The Real Blonde (1997)
- Homegrown (1998)
- Polish Wedding (1998)
- Phoenix (1998)
- 200 Cigarettes (1999)
- Runaway Bride (1999)
- Arlington Road (1999)
- Animal Farm (1999)

=== 2000s ===
- The Gift (2000)
- Autumn in New York (2000)
- The Next Best Thing (2000)
- Passion of Mind (2000)
- The Mothman Prophecies (2002)
- Bulletproof Monk (2003)
- Underworld (2003)
- The Hunted (2003)
- The Human Stain (2003)
- Purpose (2003)
- Singing Behind Screens (2003)
- Suspect Zero (2004)
- Wicker Park (2004)
- Madhouse (2004)
- The Keys to the House (2004)
- Million Dollar Baby (2004)
- The Cave (2005)
- Undiscovered (2005)
- The Exorcism of Emily Rose (2005)
- Crazy Monkey Presents Straight Outta Benoni (2005)
- Æon Flux (2005)
- Underworld: Evolution (2006)
- She's the Man (2006)
- Half Light (2006)
- Crank (2006)
- The Covenant (2006)
- The Last Kiss (2006)
- The Dead Girl (2006)
- Blood & Chocolate (2007)
- Feast of Love (2007)
- Elegy (2007)
- The Midnight Meat Train (2008)
- Untraceable (2008)
- Kamasutra Nights (2008)
- Henry Poole Is Here (2008)
- Pathology (2008)
- Underworld: Rise of the Lycans (2009)
- Crank: High Voltage (2009)
- The Ugly Truth (2009)
- Gamer (2009)
- Fame (2009)

=== 2010s ===
- Trollhunter (2010)
- The Lincoln Lawyer (2011)
- Underworld: Endless War (2011)
- Underworld: Awakening (2012)
- One for the Money (2012)
- Gone (2012)
- Stand Up Guys (2012)
- I, Frankenstein (2014)
- Walk of Shame (2014)
- The Vatican Tapes (2015)
- The Age of Adaline (2015)
- The Boy (2016)
- American Pastoral (2016)
- Underworld: Blood Wars (2016)
- Cover Versions (2018)
- Adrift (2018)
- A-X-L (2018)
- Peppermint (2018)
- The Wedding Year (2019)

=== 2020s ===
- Brahms: The Boy II (2020)

=== Television programs ===
- Heathers (Paramount Network) (2018) (co-production with Gyre & Grill Productions and Underground Films)

== Lakeshore Records ==
Lakeshore Records
- Parent company: Cutting Edge Group (2020–present)
- Genre: Soundtracks
- Country of origin: United States
- Official website: lakeshorerecords.com

Lakeshore Records is a soundtrack record label, originally founded as the independent music division of Lakeshore Entertainment. It had begun as Will Records, which was founded by Skip Williamson in the early 1990s.

As Will Records they released albums by artists such as Grandaddy (starting with their debut A Pretty Mess by This One Band). In 2000, Will Records acquired the catalogue of recently closed Loosegroove Records (a catalogue that included the debut full-length album by Queens of the Stone Age).

Will Records and Lakeshore Entertainment partnered to form Lakeshore Records. In 2011, it signed a home video deal with Image Entertainment.

In February 2020, it was announced that Lakeshore Records had been sold to Cutting Edge Group.

Artists

- Candiria
- College
- DJ Swamp
- Grandaddy
- Thelonious Monster
- Nick Cave and Warren Ellis
- Logan Nelson

Soundtracks

- The Gift
- Napoleon Dynamite
- La bola negra
- Little Miss Sunshine
- Superbad
- Tropic Thunder
- Red Dead Redemption 2
- Drive
- Swiss Army Man
- Moonlight
- Stranger Things
- Mandy
- The Predator
- Missing Link
- Rambo: Last Blood
- We Summon the Darkness
- Epic Movie
- Crank
- The Spiderwick Chronicles
- The Last Airbender
- D.E.B.S.
- Red, White & Royal Blue
- Scrooge: A Christmas Carol
- Miraculous: Ladybug & Cat Noir, The Movie (US Distribution)
- Scott Pilgrim Takes Off
- Terminator Zero
- Verity
- Winter Spring Summer or Fall
