= Kevin Grevioux =

American screenwriter (born 1962)

- Grevioux at DragonCon in 2026
- Born: September 9, 1962 (age 64); Chicago, Illinois, U.S.
- Occupations: Screenwriter, director, comic book writer, actor
- Years active: 1993–present

Kevin Grevioux (/ˈɡrɛvjuː/; born September 9, 1962) is an American actor, screenwriter, director, and comic book writer. He is best known for his role as Raze in the Underworld film series, which he co-created, as well as his voice work as Black Beetle in Young Justice.

== Education ==
Grevioux graduated from Howard University in Washington, D.C. in 1987 with a degree in microbiology with minors in both chemistry and psychology, afterwards attending graduate school working towards a master's degree in genetic engineering. Grevioux began taking screenwriting and cinematography classes as well, and after his first semester of grad school had finished, he moved to Los Angeles to begin to work as a writer in earnest. He has written several spec scripts in various genres. He also started a graphic novel company called Darkstorm Comic Studios in 2003.

== Career ==
As an actor, he has been seen in such films as The Mask, Steel, Congo, Tim Burton's Planet of the Apes remake, and the 2003 vampire vs. werewolf film, Underworld.

Underworld was Grevioux's first produced writing credit. He came up with the original concept/premise and wrote the original screenplay along with director Len Wiseman, launching the Underworld franchise. He appears in the film itself as a lycan, Raze, and returned as the character in the Underworld prequel Underworld: Rise of the Lycans, which he will also be adapting into a comic book mini-series. He expressed an interest in telling more Underworld stories in comic form if the film was successful.

Using Romeo and Juliet as an archetype, Grevioux based Underworld on his experiences with interracial dating and the tension that it often causes. He also brought a scientific element to the world of vampires and werewolves by basing vampirism and lycanthropy on a viral mutagen rather than the mysticism typically associated with these two mythic creatures.

Early 2006 saw Grevioux form two comic book imprints, Astounding Comics and Darkstorm Comics under his Darkstorm Comics and Media banner. Grevioux's Astounding Studios imprint was to focus on all-ages titles such as Valkyries, Guardian Heroes and The Hammer Kid. The Darkstorm Studios imprint was a more mature line, including the books Alivs Rex, Skull and Guns and Uzan, The Mighty.

Grevioux's voice is distinctively deep. In the commentary track of Underworld, he relates that during the promotion and launch of the film, many fans asked him if his voice had been altered by computer, and were surprised to learn that it had not been.

Grevioux wrote the fourth volume of the Marvel Comics series The New Warriors. Grevioux also wrote Adam: Legend of the Blue Marvel, introducing Blue Marvel, a character he created in his teens. The miniseries was drawn by Mat Broome and Roberto Castro. He is also in the process of writing a story featuring Lee Falk's characters The Phantom and Mandrake the Magician, co-written with Mike Bullock. He also wrote ZMD: Zombies of Mass Destruction for Red 5 Comics.

On December 2, 2009, Grevioux hosted a pilot episode for a concept series, Monster Tracker, on Discovery Channel.

He sold the original screenplay for the film adaptation of his Darkstorm Comics Studios graphic novel, I, Frankenstein, to Lakeshore Entertainment, which also produced the Underworld films. The story follows the original monster of Victor Frankenstein who is the only force that stands between the human race and an uprising of supernatural creatures determined to overthrow the world. Filming began on February 27, 2012, and the film was released in January 2014.

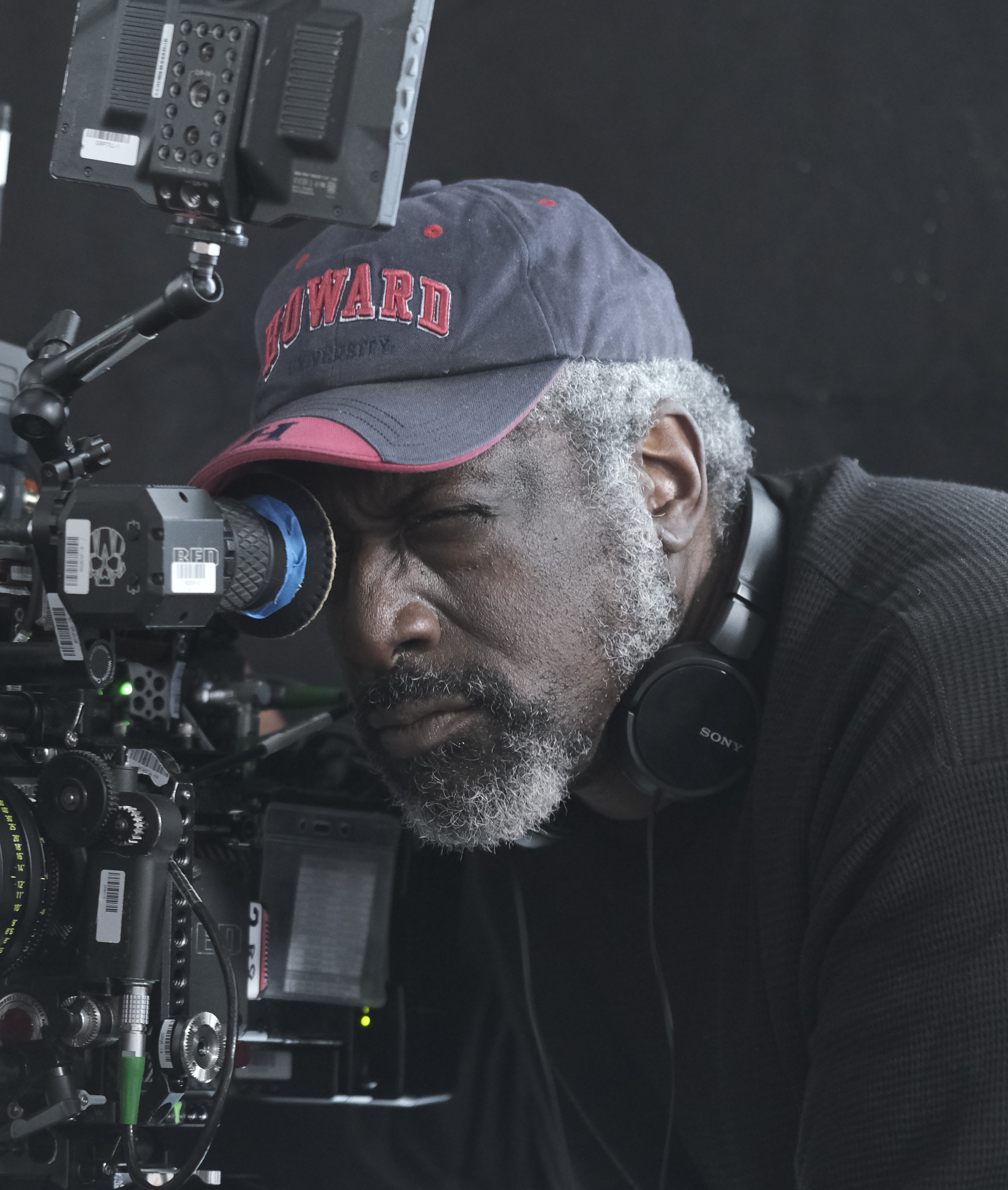
Grevioux Directing on the set of King of Killers

Since November 6, 2017, Line Webtoon has been publishing Brothers Bond, an action webcomic collaboration with Ryan Benjamin. Benjamin and Grevioux were both nominated for the esteemed Eisner Award for Best Webcomic.

In 2019, Grevioux portrayed The Vault Keeper in "EC Comics Presents The Vault of Horror", a full-cast audio drama adapting the first 24 stories from the first six issues of the original EC comic series.

In 2022, Grevioux directed, wrote, and produced the action film King of Killers, starring Alain Moussi and Frank Grillo, through his production company Channel 56 Films. It was based on his Darkstorm graphic novel.

Grevioux is an avid NFL fan. His favorite team is the Minnesota Vikings.

== Filmography ==
=== Film ===
| Year | Title | Role | Notes |
|---|---|---|---|
| 1994 | Naked Gun 33 1/3: The Final Insult | Prison Guard | Uncredited |
| 1994 | Speed | Bombsquad SWAT officer | Uncredited |
| 1994 | The Mask | Henchman #7 | |
| 1994 | Stargate | Fossil Guard | Uncredited |
| 1995 | Congo | Roadblock Officer | |
| 1995 | Showgirls | Andrew Carver's Bodyguard | |
| 1995 | Batman Forever | Two-Face's Thug | |
| 1996 | The Great White Hype | Security Guard | Uncredited |
| 1997 | Steel | Singer | |
| 1997 | Don King: Only in America | Leon Spinks | Television film |
| 1999 | Bowfinger | Kit's Bodyguard | |
| 2000 | Charlie's Angels | Bouncer #2 | |
| 2000 | The Flintstones in Viva Rock Vegas | Associate Goon | |
| 2001 | Planet of the Apes | Limbo's first Handler, Ape Commander, second Ape Soldier | |
| 2002 | Men in Black II | Pineal Eye | |
| 2003 | Cradle 2 the Grave | Inmate Guard | Uncredited |
| 2003 | Hulk | Mitchell | Uncredited |
| 2003 | Dickie Roberts: Former Child Star | Emmanuel Lewis's Entourage | |
| 2003 | Underworld | Raze | Also first produced writing credit |
| 2005 | Dirty | Daddy | |
| 2006 | Slayer | Grieves | |
| 2009 | Underworld: Rise of the Lycans | Raze | Also graphic novel writer |
| 2014 | I, Frankenstein | Dekar | Also screen story, graphic novel |
| 2017 | Animal Crackers | Samson | Voice |
| 2022 | The Prey: The Legend of Karnoctus | Reid | |
| 2022 | King of Killers | Dyson Chord | Also director, executive producer, screenplay, graphic novel writer |

=== Television ===
| Year | Title | Role | Notes |
|---|---|---|---|
| 1993–1994 | Star Trek: Deep Space Nine | Starfleet Security Officer | 12 episodes, uncredited |
| 1994 | Alien Nation: Dark Horizon | Sam | Television film |
| 1997 | Quicksilver Highway | Police Sergeant | Television film |
| 1997 | Alien Nation: The Udara Legacy | Miller | Television film |
| 2000 | Malcolm in The Middle | Police Agent | Temporada 2, capitulo 1 |
| 2005 | The Batman | Solomon Grundy | Voice, episode: "Grundy's Night" |
| 2010 | Spartacus: Blood and Sand – Motion Comic | Doctore, Numidian | Voice, episode: "The Shadow of Death" |
| 2012–2013 | Young Justice | Black Beetle | Voice, recurring role |
| 2012 | The Avengers: Earth's Mightiest Heroes | Terrax | Voice, episode: "Avengers Assemble!" |
| 2013 | Payday 2: The Web Series | The Haitian | 2 episodes |
| 2014 | Hulk and the Agents of S.M.A.S.H. | Super-Skrull | Voice, 2 episodes |
| 2019 | Cannon Busters | Black Claw | Voice, English dub |

=== Video games ===
| Year | Title | Role | Notes |
|---|---|---|---|
| 2008 | Command & Conquer 3: Kane's Wrath | | |
| 2018 | Marvel Powers United VR | Groot | |

== Bibliography ==
- Astounding Heroes, starring The Vindicators (Astounding Comics, 2006)
- Guardian Heroes (Astounding Comics, 2006)
- Valkyries (Astounding Comics, 2006)
- Toy Box (Astounding Comics, 2006)
- Alius Rex (Darkstorm Comics & Media, 2006)
- The Hammer Kid (Astounding Comics, 2006)
- New Warriors (Marvel Comics)
- What If? Civil War (Marvel Comics, 2007)
- Spider-Man Family #5, Guest Starring Dr. Strange (Marvel Comics, 2007)
- Spider-Man Family #8, Guest Starring Iron Man (Marvel Comics, 2007)
- Monstroids (Astounding Comics, Original graphic novel, 2008)
- Sista Samurai (Darkstorm Comics & Media, 2008)
- The Phantom Annual #2 (Moonstone, 2008)
- What If? Secret Invasion (Marvel Comics, 2008)
- Young Avengers Presents #5, featuring Stature (Marvel Comics, 2008)
- ZMD: Zombies of Mass Destruction (Red 5 Comics, forthcoming)
- Adam: Legend of the Blue Marvel (with Mat Broome, 5-issue limited series, Marvel Comics, November 2008–May 2009)
- Spider-Man vs. Vampires (Marvel Comics, One-shot, 2010)
- Justice Society of America 80-Page Giant #1 (DC Comics, 2010)
- Holiday Special 2010 (DC Comics, One-shot, 2010)
- Age of Heroes #3 (Marvel Comics, 4-issue limited series, 2010)
- Wetworks Mutations (Wildstorm, 2010)
- Breaking Into Comics the Marvel Way #2 (Marvel Comics, 2010)
- Batman 80-Page Giant #1 (DC Comics, 2020)
- Underworld: Rise of the Lycans (with Andrew Huerta, 2-issue mini-series, IDW Publishing, forthcoming)
- I, Frankenstein Genesis (Darkstorm Comics & Media, Movie tie-in, 2013)
- Amazing Spider-Man #700.5 (Marvel Comics, 2014)
- Brothers Bond (Rocketship Entertainment, Original graphic novel, 2016)
- Odyssey of the Amazons (DC Comics, 6-issue limited series, 2017)
- Underworld: Blood Wars (Darkstorm Comics & Media, Movie Adaptation, 2017)
- Cyborg #19-20 (DC Comics, 2018)
- Bloodshot: Rising Spirit (Valiant Entertainment, limited series, 2018)
- Noble #15-19 (Lion Forge, 2019)
- Bass Reeves (Allegiance Arts & Entertainment, Original graphic novel, 2019)
- Psycho List (Black Box Comics, 6-issue limited series, 2019)
- Darkstorm, the Conqueror (Darkstorm Comics & Media, 4-issue limited series, 2020)
- DJINNTARA: Rise of the Djinn (Zenescope Entertainment and Darkstorm Comics, 2023)
- Winter Ember (Blowfish Studios, 6-issue limited series, 2022)
