= Danny McBride (writer) =

American stuntman and screenwriter

- Born: Daniel Flynn McBride; United States
- Occupation(s): Screenwriter, film producer, stuntman
- Spouse: Ildikó Kovács

Daniel Flynn McBride is an American stuntman and screenwriter, best known as one of the three creators of the Underworld film series. He first started in filmmaking performing stunts in the 1990s, introduced by Scott McElroy, with whom he formed company The Scuba Dudes Action Team. In 2000, he was introduced to director Len Wiseman by their shared agent, and Wiseman a few years later would ask him to write the final screenplay for Underworld. McBride would also write the two sequels that followed.

He also had a cameo in Underworld as Mason, a vampire loyal to Death Dealer Commander Kahn. His wife, Ildikó Kovács, also appears in the film in photographs of Samantha, the late fiancée of the character Michael Corvin.
