= List of Blue Mountain State episodes =

Blue Mountain State is an American comedy series that premiered on Spike on January 11, 2010. All three of the seasons of the show were aired on Spike TV. The series follows the players on the football team of the fictional university, Blue Mountain State, and its rather awkward team "The Goats" as they explore the freedoms of college life, including football, scoring with women, drinking binges, wild partying, and hazing. The series was created by Chris Romano, who also stars in the series.

As of November 30, 2011, a total of 39 episodes have been shown. The series was renewed for a second season in February 2010. A sneak peek of the second episode of season two aired on October 16; the season premiere was on October 20, 2010. Blue Mountain State was renewed for a third season and it premiered on September 21, 2011 with back-to-back episodes.

== Series overview ==
Season	Episodes	Originally released	
Season	Episodes	First released	Last released
1	13	January 11, 2010	March 30, 2010
2	13	October 16, 2010	January 19, 2011
3	13	September 21, 2011	November 30, 2011

== Episodes ==
=== Season 1 (2010) ===
No. overall	No. in season	Title	Directed by	Written by	Original release date	US viewers (millions)
1	1	"It's Called Hazing, Look It Up"	Brian Robbins	Eric Falconer & Chris Romano	January 11, 2010	N/A
Three incoming freshmen on the Blue Mountain State University football team try to adapt to a new world of college life full of football, girls, and hazing. All of the freshmen must engage in questionable hazing rituals. Sammy feels left out so he tries to become the mascot. While Alex and Craig deal with Thad's hazing rituals, Sammy opts for a darker approach: blackmailing the current BMS mascot so that he can steal the job from him without having to earn it. Sammy becomes successful in his blackmail and becomes the new mascot.
2	2	"Promise Ring"	Lev L. Spiro	Eric Falconer & Chris Romano	January 12, 2010	N/A
With Denise leaving town for the weekend, Craig is forced to wear a "promise ring" to remind him to be faithful towards her... or else. When Craig loses the ring during a night of partying at a strip club however, Alex must help him find it before Denise returns. Meanwhile Alex tries to have sex with Thad's half-sister from Bosnia, which turns out a little different than Alex had in mind.
3	3	"Pocket Pussy"	Brian Robbins	Eric Falconer & Chris Romano	January 19, 2010	N/A
The team is punished for playing badly, and a curfew is put in place shortly before their most important game of the season. To cope with the curfew hampering their social lives, the players steal Thad's personal sex toy for their own usage. The players are immediately hooked on Thad's sex toy and schedule a time table for when each player can use it. The sex toy ends up going missing due to Craig which enrages Thad. Thad explains that the sex toy is so important to him because it belonged to his dead father. Thad vows revenge upon Alex unless he can find it.
4	4	"Rivalry Weekend"	Lev L. Spiro	Eric Falconer & Chris Romano	January 26, 2010	N/A
The Goats are about to face Overland University, their most storied rivals and not to mention, their first televised game of the season. However, their starting quarterback, Travis McKenna, is suspended by the dean for soliciting a prostitute. Despite the pleas of Coach Daniels, the Dean sticks by his decision to suspend McKenna, leaving Alex as the team's starting quarterback. Unable to handle the pressure of starting, Alex searches for a way to get the McKenna reinstated. He visits the transvestite prostitute in hopes she will drop the charges; however, she refuses – Unless Craig allows her to perform fellatio on him. Denise is OK with the proposition, but Craig is not, making Alex search for another way to bring McKenna back. Meanwhile, Overland U's cheerleaders have abducted Sammy and the Goats' mascot, a goat named Billy. The Goat's abduction makes headlines but Sammy's disappearance is yet to be noticed. When Sammy accidentally kills the Billy the goat, he brings it to the field on game-day where the heated blame is immediately pinned on Overland U, which Sammy is glad to play along with. Inspired by the murdered mascot, Alex realizes he's been selfishly looking for solutions that only benefit him and not his team. The Dean refuses to stand by and watch his team lose after the opposition's ruthless mutilation of Billy the Goat and reverses his decision at game time, allowing Travis McKenna to start instead of Alex. However, unaware of the Dean's reversal, Craig tries to take the solution into his own hands, and allows the prostitute her wish.
5	5	"There's Only One Second Best"	Jeff Melman	Drew Hancock & JD Ryznar	February 2, 2010	0.887
Alex purposely starts to suck at football and is excited to get demoted to 3rd string quarterback, because being 3rd string means you practice with special teams. At the Goat House, Alex is forced to party in a secluded room with 3rd stringers, special teams and not-so-attractive girls. Alex realizes he made a terrible mistake and competes in a quarterback competition to gain his second string spot back. Meanwhile, Craig suspects Denise is cheating on him and Sammy convinces the cheerleaders get revenge on the football team.
6	6	"The Drug Olympics"	Clark Mathis	Eric Falconer & Chris Romano	February 9, 2010	N/A
Recent losses inspire Thad to hold a special lock-in at the Goat House as part of a drug-fueled team building exercise. Each player on the team picks a random drug out of a helmet to then take, except for Craig who is given one picked out by Thad. But the night takes a bizarre turn when Alex reveals that the drug taking is all a ruse. The plan was really to drug Craig because he is the only teammate who has not slept with the team's booster, better known as "The Cougar". Thad gets the team's female booster, known as "The Cougar" to have sex with Craig while he is drugged in order to break the losing streak.
7	7	"The Legend of the Golden Arm"	John Fortenberry	Brian Burns	February 16, 2010	0.810
A player-recruitment weekend brings out Batman Barstow, a running back who poses a threat to both Craig's position and relationship with Denise, while Alex competes with Thad to enlist Matt Parker, the top high-school quarterback, for Blue Mountain State.
8	8	"LAX aka The Truce"	Clark Mathis	Chip Hall	February 23, 2010	N/A
Alex accidentally breaks a 24-year-old truce between the BMS football and lacrosse teams, when he is seduced by the neglected girlfriend of the lacrosse team's captain. A cruel prank war breaks out, which could only be stopped with Alex offering up a willing virgin "sacrifice" (Sammy's new girlfriend) for the Lacrosse team to have sex with. Meanwhile, Denise instructs the lacrosse team's girlfriends in the art of withholding sex, as she teaches them to stand up for themselves against their egomaniac boyfriends.
9	9	"Midterms"	Ken Whittingham	Drew Hancock & J.D. Ryznar	March 2, 2010	N/A
The academic performance of Alex and some of his teammates comes under scrutiny as result of dismal grades and GPA's. They eventually resort to providing sexual favors for the professor's 83-year-old mother, played by Cloris Leachman, to avoid failing off the team.
10	10	"Marathon Monday"	Jay Chandrasekhar	Chip Hall	March 9, 2010	N/A
During "Marathon Monday", a BMS drinking tradition where the whole campus parties from 6 a.m. Monday to 6 a.m. Tuesday, Alex meets and hooks up with the girl of his dreams, Jill, who turns out to be just like him. Craig breaks up with Denise.
11	11	"Ransom"	Clark Mathis	Chip Hall	March 16, 2010	0.734
A deranged father stalks Alex to get him to hook up with his daughter. Thad questions Alex's team spirit because Alex refuses to slap him on the butt. Craig finally musters the courage to confront Denise and have sex with her.
12	12	"Piss Test"	John Fortenberry	Drew Hancock & J.D. Ryznar	March 23, 2010	0.750
Thad forces the team to use his 'oil change' method to pass the NCAA drug test. Sammy takes advantage of his mascot costume to score with the ladies.
13	13	"Bowl Game"	Jeff Melman	Brian Burns	March 30, 2010	0.630
Although finishing the season with a 9–3 record, BMS is picked to play the fictional Cypress Bowl against Clementine University, in Baton Rouge, Louisiana. Upon arrival in Baton Rouge, the team is placed under strict rules by Coach Daniels – no interaction with the media. The Pre-Bowl Game festivities consists of sabotage attempts by both teams, causing Thad to place some of his own rules on the team: no eating unless the food is prepared by themselves (to avoid intentional food poisoning) and a strict 10 PM "Lights Out" curfew. However, when Craig falls victim to Clementine's sabotage and is accused of rape, Thad, Alex, and Sammy must break their own rules and spend the night out in an attempt to rescue him from prison.

=== Season 2 (2010–11) ===
Blue Mountain State averaged 949,000 viewers through the first six episodes of season one while improving on the time slot by 165% among men 18–24. In February 2010 it was renewed for a second season.

No. overall	No. in season	Title	Directed by	Written by	Original release date	US viewers (millions)
14	1	"Controversy"	Lev L. Spiro	Drew Hancock	October 20, 2010	N/A
The Cheerleaders institute Hell Week, Alex and Radon compete for the starting quarterback position.
15	2	"The Fingering"	Lev L. Spiro	Eric Falconer & Chris Romano	October 16, 2010	1.094
Thad sets off an investigation after being sodomized during a practice when he tried returning an interception despite most of the team trying to stop him. Sammy meets a former BMS mascot from the 1990s who is now homeless and has been watching practices.
16	3	"Born Again"	Fred Savage	J.D. Ryznar	October 27, 2010	N/A
Because of bad reputation the team is forced to do a PR tour. In doing so, they set up a charity football game with the church. Before the event, Thad has a dream where God (Brian Bosworth) tells Thad that he will go pro if he stays celibate. While Thad is testosteroned up he starts playing incredible football during practice. Thad impresses the coaching staff so much that the coach enforces a rule that the whole team must become celibate. This causes turmoil as the entire team attempts celibacy as a way to improve their performance but it does not produce the desired outcome. As a result the charity event back fires and the players lose control of themselves. Moran meanwhile fights temptation to hook up with Sammy's sister.
17	4	"Pay for Play"	Fred Savage	Chip Hall	November 3, 2010	N/A
After becoming unhappy with Coach Daniels' income, Radon and Thad employ Alex and Sammy to be their middle-men with talent agents. Things soon spiral out of control as the power goes to Sammy's head.
18	5	"Pregnant"	Rob Schrab	Heather Flanders	November 10, 2010	N/A
A mystery call to the Goathouse sparks a campus-wide search of a girl who has fallen pregnant as a result of one of the players. The players frantically try to figure out who the call was for as well as who the girl was. The whole team finds girls from their past to make sure they are not pregnant. Meanwhile, Sammy get involved in an abusive relationship.
19	6	"Nerds"	Clay Weiner	Drew Hancock	November 17, 2010	1.23
When Sammy's bullying of one of the team's "nerds" leads to Sammy's victim being rendered comatose, the entire athletic program finds itself cut off from the students who do all of the homework for the jocks. While Thad tries desperately to salvage the working relationship between the jocks and the nerds in order to keep the new Dean from exposing the widespread academic fraud, Alex must prepare a presentation for a paper that his "nerd" wrote for him sight-unseen.
20	7	"Debra"	Clay Weiner	J.D. Ryznar	December 1, 2010	N/A
Alex successfully pursues Coach Daniels' ex-wife, Debra. Thad tells coach Daniels Alex is sleeping with his ex-wife. Coach Daniels forces Alex to continue seeing his wife, and Alex ends up being used as a messenger between coach Daniels and Debra. Meanwhile Radon creates his own advice call-in show called "Dreams".
21	8	"Vision Quest"	Clark Mathis	Drew Hancock	December 8, 2010	N/A
Considering his future, Thad takes copious drugs to try to decide whether he should leave the school and go pro a year early, or stay at BMS to complete his tenure.
22	9	"The Badger"	Rob Schrab	Kristofor Brown	December 22, 2010	N/A
To boost morale for their upcoming game with Overland, Thad kidnaps the Overland badger and plans to castrate and feast on its balls, which go awry when the badger escapes and begins attacking tailgaters. Meanwhile Mary Jo is put in charge of Billy the Goat after Sammy hung Billy the First last year. Radon spends the night before the game with coach Marty because of a threat to take his right arm which he instigated. A final confrontation between Billy the Goat and the Overland badger leaves Thad and Alex with only one option to restore the team's morale.
23	10	"Hockey"	John Fortenberry	Chip Hall	December 29, 2010	N/A
Alex gets an idea to join the hockey team to get out of conditioning for football. This causes other players to follow suit. But as the football players help the hockey players become more social. Tension arise and the hockey team takes over the goat house.
24	11	"Drunk Tank"	Jay Chandrasekhar	Drew Hancock	January 5, 2011	N/A
Thad gets the entire team arrested at a goat house party to teach the team about motivation, and Mary Jo grasps the opportunity to finally score with Alex.
25	12	"Trap Game"	John Fortenberry	Kristofor Brown	January 12, 2011	N/A
BMS has an 11–0 record. The final game is coming up and they can go for a perfect season but then Radon gets hit during practice and thinks he is injured. When Radon is injured, Alex is skeptical at first. But then realizes that he can score more girls if he wins the game for BMS as the starting quarterback. Sammy "meets" Chuck Liddell. Chuck teaches him to fight. Sammy later finds out that Chuck Liddell was actually a hallucination from eating expired candy.
26	13	"Riot"	Jay Chandrasekhar	Ryan Ridley	January 19, 2011	N/A
BMS wins the game giving them a perfect 12–0 season. After the victory a riot breaks out and the fans try to hang Sammy, the team mascot. Coach Daniels gets back together with his ex-wife Debra.

=== Season 3 (2011) ===
Aired on Spike

No. overall	No. in season	Title	Directed by	Written by	Original release date	US viewers (millions)
27	1	"Dic Pics"	John Fortenberry	Eric Falconer	September 21, 2011	0.891
Alex and Thad deal with the ramifications of a pornographic photo that Thad sent from Alex's phone after it makes its way around campus. As the dick pic makes national news, Alex admits that it's Thad's picture. This causes more drama and the whole football team is mocked on campus. Coach Daniels and Debra also start sending pornographic photos to each other, and one is mistakenly sent to Harmon, giving him the wrong idea. To end the mockery, the team makes a huge billboard of the whole team naked.
28	2	"The Captain"	Clark Mathis	JD Ryznar	September 21, 2011	N/A
Alex adjusts to becoming the starting quarterback and team captain, Thad awaits word on his future with the team after his drug related arrest following BMS' loss in last season's championship game. Following the arrival of a new offensive coordinator, Marcus Gilday (Anthony Lemke) with a desire and scheme to take BMS head coach Marty Daniels' job, Coach Daniels finds an unlikely ally in ex-wife Debra. New England Patriots wide receiver Chad Ochocinco makes a guest appearance, coming to campus to take part in a bizarre captain induction ceremony for Alex. Thad is eventually let back on the team once serving a one-game suspension.
29	3	"Thad's Back"	Clark Mathis	Heather Flanders	September 28, 2011	0.884
Thad makes some big changes in his life after he realizes his career is in trouble. Alex acts like Thad to motivate the team. Sammy thinks he's met the perfect girl until he hears what her voice sounds like. Thad changes his lifestyle back to the way he was before his suspension and becomes captain again.
30	4	"The Peak"	Jay Chandrasekhar	Drew Hancock	October 5, 2011	0.871
Alex and Sammy have a falling out when Alex plays the best game in his career and accepts it as the peak in his life. Meanwhile, Daniels and Jon Jon have mixed feelings about a job offer that Jon Jon received.
31	5	"Training Day"	Eric Appel	Heather Flanders	October 12, 2011	0.852
Thad offers to help Alex to become a local celebrity, but Alex initially refuses. Alex changes his mind when Thad saves him from a woman who wants to baby trap him with a condom that is full of holes. Thad teaches Alex to be a jerk, but in turn makes people hate Thad more. Alex ignores Thad's ways. Meanwhile, Mary Jo tries to impress Coach Daniel's wife, Debra. The episode is a clear spoof of the movie Training Day, with subtle references from the movie referenced in the episode.
32	6	"Blackout"	John Fortenberry	Kristofor Brown	October 19, 2011	0.645
A campus blackout postpones the football game and Alex becomes obsessed with trying to settle a score with a cheerleader from the rival team that he lost his virginity to. We find out that Alex wants redemption with the rival cheerleaders since she told everyone he had sex with the couch instead. Alex and Thad challenge the rival team to a game of beer pong to settle their differences. Thad makes an unexpected new friend during it. The coaches of both teams have a poker game with high stakes.
33	7	"Superstition"	Jay Chandrasekhar	Kristofor Brown	October 26, 2011	0.884
Harmon seeks out new rituals to restore his kicking skills; Sammy checks out career opportunities.
34	8	"Fun Facts"	Eric Appel	J.D. Ryznar	November 2, 2011	0.944
Thad copes with secrets from Coach Daniel's past while Alex makes a new connection with Coach Daniels as he prepares to be inducted into the College Hall of Fame.
35	9	"The C-Word"	Dean Holland	Chris Romano	November 5, 2011	N/A
Thad suffers a concussion, which affects his behavior and becomes an issue for Coach Daniels. New offensive coordinator Coach Marcus Gilday tries to get Coach Daniels fired. Sammy becomes trapped in the basement of the Goat House.
36	10	"One Week"	Dean Holland	Ryan Ridley	November 9, 2011	N/A
A television camera crew follows the team and coaches, and records the tension between Alex and new offensive coordinator Marcus Gilday. The episode also showcases Daniels' insecurities, Thad's pursuit of an acting career, and the effective use of "ice rods".
37	11	"Death Penalty"	Eric Appel	Drew Hancock	November 16, 2011	N/A
The team finds out they will be playing for the National Championship against Blackwell, but a scandal threatens to disqualify BMS and award the title to Blackwell by default. However, after some negotiations, the NCAA decided that BMS will play against Blackwell. Unfortunately, Coach Daniels, Thad, Alex, and most of the Goats' starting roster are barred from the lineup.
38	12	"The Corn Field"	Alex Winter	Story by : Eric Falconer; Teleplay by : Kristofor Brown, Chris Romano	November 30, 2011	N/A
After the depleted BMS squad is destroyed in the national title game, Thad has an epiphany which causes him to build a football stadium on a cornfield outside of town. Blackwell is invited to play the unofficial national title game.
39	13	"The Corn Field 2"	Alex Winter	Story by : Eric Falconer; Teleplay by : Kristofor Brown, Chris Romano	November 30, 2011	N/A
Continuation from "The Corn Field". BMS and Blackwell play an unsanctioned game. The series finale.
