= Acoustic Live from the Gibson Lounge =

EP by Rev Theory
- Released: August 4, 2009
- Genre: Acoustic rock
- Length: 31:19
- Label: Interscope

Rev Theory chronology
Light It Up (2008)	Acoustic Live from the Gibson Lounge (2009)	Justice (2011)

Acoustic Live from the Gibson Lounge is an acoustic EP released by the American rock band Rev Theory. It was released on iTunes on August 4, 2009, and is also sold at the band's concerts. The digital version also contains a bonus Metallica cover of "Nothing Else Matters".

== Track listing ==
1. "Wanted Man" – 5:46
2. "Broken Bones" – 6:02
3. "Far From Over" – 5:15
4. "Hunger Strike" (Temple of the Dog Cover) – 4:41
5. "Hell Yeah" – 5:15
6. "Nothing Else Matters" (Metallica Cover) (U.S. iTunes bonus track) – 5:00
