= The Revelation (Rev Theory album) =

Studio album by Rev Theory
- Released: September 9, 2016
- Recorded: 2014–2016
- Genre: Hard rock; heavy metal
- Length: 36:36
- Label: Another Century
- Producer: Matty McCloskey, Julien Jorgensen

Rev Theory chronology
Take 'Em Out (2012)	The Revelation (2016)	Salvation Nowhere (2024)

Singles from The Revelation
- 1. "Red Light Queen" Released: February 20, 2014; 2. "We Own the Night" Released: February 8, 2016; 3. "Guns" Released: July 29, 2016; 4. "Piece of Me" Released: August 28, 2016

The Revelation is the fourth studio album by the American rock band Rev Theory. It was released on September 9, 2016, through Another Century Records. It is the band's first full-length studio album since Justice.

== Track listing ==
No.	Title	Length
1.	"Guns"	3:53
2.	"We Own the Night"	3:43
3.	"Red Light Queen"	3:09
4.	"Piece of Me"	2:58
5.	"Killing Kind"	3:05
6.	"We Don't Follow"	3:22
7.	"My Killers"	2:54
8.	"Blow It Up"	3:23
9.	"Lessons"	3:23
10.	"Other Side"	3:35
11.	"Candle Burns"	3:11
Total length:		36:36
