= Light It Up =

Light It Up may refer to:

== Film ==
- Light It Up (film), a 1999 American teen drama film

== Music ==
=== Albums ===
- Light It Up (Casey Barnes album) or the title song, 2022
- Light It Up (Rev Theory album) or the title song (see below), 2008
- Light It Up (Will Young album) or the title song, 2024
- Light It Up (soundtrack) or the title song, from the 1999 film
- Light It Up, by Hot Water Music, 2017

=== Songs ===
- "Light It Up" (Luke Bryan song), 2017
- "Light It Up" (Major Lazer song), 2015
- "Light It Up" (Marcus & Martinus song), 2016
- "Light It Up" (Marshmello, Tyga and Chris Brown song), 2019
- "Light It Up" (Rev Theory song), 2008
- "Light It Up" (Stan Walker song), 2011
- "Light It Up", by Blood Red Shoes from Fire like This, 2010
- "Light It Up", by Dierks Bentley from Black, 2016
- "Light It Up", by For King & Country from Crave, 2012
- "Light It Up", by Gossip from Real Power, 2024
- "Light It Up", by Migos from Culture III, 2021
- "Light It Up", by the Offspring from Supercharged, 2024
- "Light It Up", by OneRepublic from Native, 2013
- "Light It Up", by Third Eye Blind from Screamer, 2019
- "Light It Up", by Topic, 2014
- "Light It Up", by XO-IQ, from the TV series Make It Pop, 2015
- "Light It Up", by Young Thug from So Much Fun, 2019
