= Blue Mountain State: The Rise of Thadland =

2016 film by Lev L. Spiro

- Promotional poster
- Directed by: Lev Spiro
- Written by: Eric Falconer; Chris Romano; Alan Ritchson
- Based on: Blue Mountain State by Chris Romano; Eric Falconer
- Produced by: Eric Falconer; Eric Fischer; Chris Romano; Alan Ritchson; Michael Keller
- Starring: Darin Brooks; Alan Ritchson; Chris Romano
- Cinematography: Mathew Rudenberg
- Edited by: Matthew Shaw
- Music by: Jake Staley
- Production companies: AllyCat Entertainment; BMS Brands; Dead Fish Films; Falconer / Romanski; Union Entertainment Group (II)
- Distributed by: Lionsgate
- Release date: February 2, 2016
- Running time: 90 minutes
- Language: English
- Budget: $1.9 million

Blue Mountain State: The Rise of Thadland is a 2016 American comedy film directed by Lev L. Spiro and starring Darin Brooks, Alan Ritchson, and Chris Romano. It is based on the Spike (now Paramount Network) series Blue Mountain State. Picking up where season 3 of the series left off, the plot follows Alex Moran, now in his senior year, who must throw an epic party for Thad, who has recently been drafted into the NFL, in an effort to get him to buy the Goat House from the new Dean of sports.

Following the cancellation of the series in early 2012, rumors of a reboot of feature-length film circulated. As the show gained a cult following, members of the cast, including Ed Marinaro and Page Kennedy, hinted at a possible project. On April 8, 2014, the film was officially announced, with the creators launching a Kickstarter to raise funds; filming took place in North Carolina in late-2014. The film was released on February 2, 2016 by Lionsgate.

== Plot ==
Alex Moran has begun his senior year at Blue Mountain State. Since the team is predicted to not do as well this season, he decides to dedicate his final year more to partying.

Meanwhile, a new dean threatens to take over the Goat House, the party location for the school's football team. Alex reaches out to Thad Castle, who has recently been drafted into the NFL, to buy the house. Thad agrees he will, but only if Alex throws a party in his honor and it meets his wild expectations. The party, full of drugs and amusement rides, gets out of hand, but Thad is impressed nevertheless.

The auction begins for the house, and Thad bids five million dollars on it (having outbid himself from three million). Alex celebrates having "his" house back, and Thad confronts him on only thinking of himself when agreeing to create Thadland. Thad angrily banishes Alex from the Goat House.

Alex, in a dream, sees a potential future where Sammy is dead, Thad, now a middle-aged wash-up, is living in the Goat House, having never left, and Alex is now his house boy. Horrified, Alex wakes up in the middle of a deserted field. He walks to a nearby road, where he flags down a car driven by his old teammate, Craig Shilo. The two go to Thadland together, which is still running as a shell of its former self, with derelict amusement attractions and multiple deaths as a result of partying too much. Alex finds a drugged-out Sammy, who has eaten Billy as a form of vengeance.

At a press conference about Thadland and Coach Marty Daniels' poor personal behavior, Daniels angrily tells the reporters and Dean Oliviares off, admitting to everything he's done and denying any regret for it.

In the basement of the Goat House, Alex confronts Harmon about inhalant drugs in balloons and what is inside them. Harmon reveals that the drugs are a fermented gas derived from the house's septic tank. A disgusted Alex uses his authority as captain to coerce Harmon to shut the tanks down, to which he complies. Upstairs, Alex finds Thad and Mary Jo, both of whom are high due to the drug. Alex confronts him about his supposed wealth and asks why he can waste his time at a party at a college campus rather than attending practice with his professional team. Thad tearfully reveals that his contract was voided due to his bad behavior upon receiving his money, and that all of his wealth was fake. Alex, enraged, asks why he did that, and Thad produces a handgun, declaring that if he couldn't have his wealth, he wanted to die because he was out of money and had no friends. Alex refuses to help Thad kill himself but instead has another plan.

In the basement, Dick Dawg, Thad's cousin, begins to rig the septic and gas tanks to explode, but is confronted by a drugged Sammy; the two fight, with Dick Dawg easily overpowering Sammy, who is knocked unconscious by falling debris. The house begins to crumble, prompting everyone inside to evacuate. Upstairs, Alex and Thad embrace, with Thad asking him to remember his story. Alex leaves with Mary Jo, and Dick Dawg carries the unconscious Sammy out of harm's way. The Goat House explodes.

Mary Jo sympathetically consoles Alex about the house he fought so hard for, to which he responds that it's "just a house." The Dean celebrates his so-called victory over Alex but begins to hyperventilate from the excitement. Before Alex can confront him, Harmon, in the guise of providing oxygen, gives Oliviares a puff of his drug. The dean begins to hallucinate and promptly begins humping Holly, likely costing him his reputation and job. In a line-up, Alex, Mary Jo, Larry, Donnie, Harmon, Shilo, and Radon all toast to Thad's memory.

One month later, Thad is relaxing on a beach (with a mojito).

== Cast ==
- Darin Brooks as Alex Moran
- Alan Ritchson as Thad Castle
- Chris Romano as Sammy Cacciatore
- Ed Marinaro as Coach Marty Daniels
- Frankie Shaw as Mary Jo Cacciatore
- Rob Ramsay as Donnie Schrab
- James Cade as Harmon Tedesco
- Omari Newton as Larry Summers
- Jimmy Tatro as Dick Dawg
- Ed Amatrudo as Dean Olivares
- Sam Jones III as Craig Shilo
- Page Kennedy as Radon Randell
- Lindsey Sporrer as Holly
- Dhani Jones as himself
- Hudson Shank as Young Thad

== Production ==
In March 2013, Ed Marinaro stated in an interview with Class Act Sports that he was working on a Blue Mountain State film. He continued to hint on Twitter at some 'behind-the-scenes' work being done on said movie. In early March 2014, Page Kennedy started hinting at Blue Mountain State reunion project on Instagram, Vine and Twitter along with Darin Brooks, Kelly Kruger, Alan Ritchson, Sam Jones III, Frankie Shaw and Romanski.

On April 8, 2014, Blue Mountain State: The Movie was officially announced. On April 15, the production launched a Kickstarter campaign, much like the hugely successful 2013 campaign by Veronica Mars to get the cancelled show made into a feature film. The project's goal was to raise $1.5 million by May 15 in order to fund the film. There were rewards for donating to campaign, such as personalized tweets from the cast (for donating $10), shot and pint glasses with the BMS logo ($20), and a speaking role in the film (for a $10,000 donation).

On May 11, 2014, the Kickstarter goal of $1.5 million was reached. On May 15, 2014 the Kickstarter campaign ended, with the final funds raised being $1,911,827 from 24,000 backers.

In May 2014, it was announced Jay Chandrasekhar would be the director of the film. However, on September 28, 2014, Lev L. Spiro was hired as the new director of BMS: The Movie. The crew started filming in late 2014 on location in Wilmington, North Carolina.

On December 14, 2014, Ritchson tweeted that filming had completed.

== Release ==
Originally slated for a September 2015 release, the film was pushed back due to issues with the studio and distribution. Writer and producer Eric Falconer said the film originally received an NC-17 rating from the MPAA, but certain scenes were edited in order to get the film down to an R rating. On January 14, 2016, the film's trailer was released, along with Falconer setting a February 2, 2016 release date.

On March 1, 2016, the film was released on Netflix.
