= Light Up =

Light Up may refer to:

== Music ==
- "Light Up (The World)", a 2012 song by Yasmin
- "Light Up", a song by Drake featuring Jay-Z, on the 2010 album Thank Me Later
- "Light Up", a single by Styx from the 1975 album Equinox
- "Light Up", a song by Tegan and Sara from the 2009 album Sainthood
- Light Up (EP), a 2020 extended play by UP10TION

== Other uses ==
- Light Up (puzzle), a binary-determination logic puzzle published by Nikoli
- Light Up (sculpture), a sculpture by Tony Smith
- Lighting up, locking in on a potential target with a fire-control radar
- Light Up (film), a 2024 American documentary film

== See also ==
- Light It Up (disambiguation)
