= Take 'Em Out =

EP by Rev Theory
- Released: 2012
- Genre: Hard rock
- Label: Killer Tracks
- Producer: Wax Ltd

Rev Theory chronology
Justice (2011)	Take 'Em Out (2012)	The Revelation (2016)

Take 'Em Out is a four-song EP released by the American rock band Rev Theory. It was released commercially on iTunes and Spotify on November 27, 2012. The EP was produced by Wax Ltd in Hollywood and it was released through Universal Music Group's specialty licensing label/publisher Killer Tracks.

== Track listing ==
1. "Something New" - 2:58
2. "Adrenalize" - 2:32
3. "Take 'Em Out" - 2:31
4. "Undefeated" - 2:40
