= Charles Stephen Romanski =

American actor and model (1943–1993)

Clint Lockner
- Born: Charles Stephen Romanski; April 23, 1943; Lincoln Park, Wayne County, Michigan, U.S.
- Died: June 17, 1993 (aged 50); La Jolla, San Diego County, California, U.S.
- Other name: Chuck
- Occupations: Actor; Model; Police officer; Pilot
- Years active: 1960–1993
- Agent: Colt Studio

Clint Lockner (May 23, 1943 – June 17, 1993), born Charles Stephen Romanshi and informally as Chuck, was an American military veteran, law enforcement officer, commercial aviator, and adult film performer. He achieved prominence in the late 1970s and 1980s as one of the most recognizable "Colt Men" for Jim French's Colt Studios, defining the era's hyper-masculine "clone" aesthetic. His real-life background as a decorated Los Angeles Police Department (LAPD) officer lent a unique authenticity to his erotic portrayals, causing significant cultural shockwaves within the department following his resignation.

== Early life and education ==
Romanski was born on May 23, 1943, in Lincoln Park, Wayne County, Michigan. He was raised in a strict Catholic environment and attended local parochial schools. From a young age, Romanski displayed a profound talent for music, specifically studying classical piano. Close friends later remarked that he remained a highly skilled and passionate pianist throughout his life, maintaining a refined, cultured disposition that contrasted with his rugged physique.

== Career ==
=== Military and aviation ===
Upon graduating from high school at the age of seventeen in 1960, Romanski enlisted in the United States Navy, serving one full tour of duty. Seeking further challenge, he subsequently enlisted in the United States Marine Corps for a second tour of military service. He excelled under the rigid discipline of the military, climbing to the rank of Staff Sergeant before receiving an honorable discharge.

Following his military career, Romanski relocated to Southern California and transitioned into aviation. He successfully earned his commercial pilot's license, subsequently flying commercial and private jets on regular regional routes between Palm Springs, California, and Las Vegas, Nevada.

=== Law enforcement ===
In 1970, Romanski joined the Los Angeles Police Department (LAPD). Over a seven-to-eight-year tenure, he worked extensively as a squad car patrol officer and later as an undercover vice detective in the Valley Division. Within the department, Romanski was widely respected and decorated, earning a reputation among his peers as a "cop's cop" and a "man's man" who commanded authority and demonstrated immense effectiveness on the street.

During his personal time, Romanski was an avid motorcyclist who owned and rode a Harley-Davidson for pleasure. Though he never served as a formal LAPD motorcycle officer, his familiar association with the subculture influenced his later creative work.

=== Resignation and departmental impact ===
Romanski resigned from the LAPD between 1978 and 1980. Contemporary records indicate his departure was prompted by a desire to escape the prevailing right-wing, fundamentalist, and exclusionary attitudes held by several of his fellow officers.

His resignation and subsequent entry into gay adult media caused massive institutional paranoia within the LAPD. Because Romanski had perfectly embodied the department's idealized image of a highly competent, masculine officer, his departure shattered prevailing homosexual stereotypes of the era. His former colleagues faced widespread anxiety, fearing that if an officer of Romanski's caliber could successfully conceal his personal life for nearly a decade, other closeted officers could be doing the same.

=== Adult entertainment and modeling ===
Shortly before separating from the LAPD, Romanski was scouted by photographer Jim French, the founder of Colt Studio. Adopting the pseudonym Clint Lockner, he quickly became a centerpiece of the studio's print magazines, celebrated for his chiseled physique, rugged features, and prominent mustache. His print photography formed the foundational core of his enduring visual legacy.

Lockner's screen appearances were selective but highly influential. He brought the genuine swagger, discipline, and authoritative mannerisms of his law enforcement background directly to the camera.

He appeared in Face to Face which was directed by Steve Scott, this film solidified Lockner's status as a premier performer of the early 1980s VHS boom. Later he appeared in Moving Violations in this iconic vignette, Lockner famously portrayed a motorcycle cop. He commanded a highly regarded, intense threesome alongside fellow Colt powerhouses Mike Davis and Mark Rutter.

Although typically celebrated as a dominant "top" performer, Lockner famously demonstrated his performance range by "bottoming" for the dark, hairy Latin performer Bruno in a critically acclaimed scene. He also turned in notable performances in San Francisco, Playing with Danger, Lockner's Key, and Trapped alongside Mickey Squires.

=== Entrepreneurship and later life ===
From 1979 to 1984, Lockner and his real-life romantic partner, fellow adult performer Dan Pace professionally known as Rocky Genero, co-owned and operated The Sanctuary, a private club in Hollywood. During this period, Lockner and Pace also created and performed in a live nightclub act. Designed as an artistic erotic presentation, the live show featured the duo in cop and construction fetish gear, emphasizing the masculinity of working men.

Following the closure of the club and the amicable end of their romantic relationship, Lockner and Pace maintained a deep, lifelong friendship. Lockner briefly relocated to Washington, D.C., where he worked as a retail associate at a Radio Shack for eight months. He subsequently returned to his native Michigan to act as a primary caregiver for his ailing mother until her passing.

In 1990, Lockner permanently settled in San Diego, California. Stepping entirely away from the adult industry, he spent his final years working a traditional corporate job as a credit collector for Bank of America.

== Personal life ==
Romanski's most prominent romantic relationship was with fellow adult film star Dan Pace known professionally as Rocky Genero. The two were romantic partners throughout the late 1970s and early 1980s, living and collaborating closely in Southern California. Even after their romantic partnership ended, Romanski and Pace preserved an unbroken, lifelong bond, remaining each other's closest friends and confidants until Romanski's death.

He was a talented pianist who favored classical music, frequently playing for close friends. He balanced this artistic passion with a love for motorcycle culture, frequently taking long, personal rides on his Harley-Davidson motorcycle through the California landscape.

After relocating to San Diego in 1990, Romanski shared a home with his roommate, Lee Albert. His domestic life in San Diego was characterized by a quiet normalcy that contrasted sharply with his earlier Hollywood career.

== Death ==
On June 17, 1993, Romanski died from AIDS-related complications at the Veterans Administration Hospital in La Jolla, San Diego County, California, at the age of 50. He was survived by his three sisters, his roommate Lee Albert, and his lifelong companion Dan Pace. Following a celebration of life luncheon held at his former residence, Romanski was cremated, and his ashes were scattered off the coast of Santa Barbara, California, on August 21, 1993.

== Filmography ==
=== Film ===
Year	Title	Role	Notes
1981	Face to Face	Highway Patrol Cop	Debut
1981	San Francisco	Chuck	Colt Studio
1981	Playing with Danger	Clint Lockner	Colt Studio
1981	Moving Violations	Motorcycle Cop	Iconic uniform vignette with Mike Davis and Mark Rutter
1982	Best of Bruno 2	Clint	Critically acclaimed scene pairing with performer Bruno
1982	Lockner's Key	Clint Lockner	
1982	The Best of Colt Films, Part 1	Clint	
1982	Trapped	Cop	Featured scene with Mickey Squires
1986	Best Of Colt Films 1	Clint Lockner	
1986	Best Of Colt Films 3	Clint Lockner	
1986	The Best Of Colt: Part 4	Clint Lockner	
1990	Love a Man with a Mustache 3	Clint Lockner	
1991	Best Of Colt Films 9	Clint Lockner	
1992	The Best of Colt Films, Part 11	Clint Lockner	
1992	Best Of Colt Films 12	Clint	
1993	Cum Shots	Clint Lockner	
2000	Couples 1: Colt Men On The Make	Clint Lockner	Posthumous release

== Legacy ==
Lockner's image survived him for decades through archival footage. Colt Studios consistently featured him in retrospective video compilations, including Best of Colt Films volumes 1, 3, 4, 9, and 12, as well as the 2000 release Couples 1: Colt Men On The Make.
