= Justice (Rev Theory album) =

Studio album by Rev Theory
- Released: February 15, 2011
- Recorded: April–June 2010
- Studio: Henson Recording Studios (Hollywood)
- Genre: Hard rock; heavy metal
- Length: 42:13
- Label: Interscope
- Producer: Terry Date

Rev Theory chronology
Light It Up (2008)	Justice (2011)	Take 'Em Out (2012)

Singles from Justice
- 1. "Justice" Released: October 25, 2010; 2. "The Fire" Released: 2011

Justice is the third studio album by American rock band Rev Theory, released on February 15, 2011, by Interscope Records. The first single, also titled "Justice", was released to iTunes and radio on October 25, 2010. Justice peaked at number five on the US Billboard Hard Rock Albums chart and number 75 on the Billboard 200. The album has sold 54,000 copies in the United States to date. The title track was used for WWE's Extreme Rules in 2011. The song "Hangman" was used for the secondary theme song for WWE's SmackDown from 2009 to 2012. Justice was the band's last album to feature lead guitarist Rikki Lixx, who left for personal reasons.

== Background ==
On November 14, 2010, the band announced their upcoming third album for a February 15, 2011 release. Guitarist Julien Jorgensen explained that they wanted the record to more resemble their 2005 debut Truth Is Currency than 2008's Light It Up, saying they went through "a bit of an identity crisis" after signing with a major label and were expected to write a hit than being a band that knew their strengths. Lead singer Rich Luzzi said that the band had a list of names for the album, and felt it was the right title after coming off Light It Up with "feelings of anger and just felt like there were some injustices served to ourselves in our lives and our careers."

== Promotion ==
In December 2010, the band partnered with Monster Energy to headline their Outbreak Tour with rock bands Pop Evil, Hail the Villain and the Black Cloud Collective, beginning on February 16, 2011 at Phoenix's Clubhouse venue and ending on March 6 at Eleanor Rigby's in Jermyn, Pennsylvania. On March 7, the band stepped in for All That Remains and joined Hail the Villain as openers for Black Label Society on their Uranium Tour, starting on June 1 at The Pageant in St. Louis and finishing on June 5 at The National in Richmond, Virginia. Two days later, the band were announced as co-headliners alongside Saliva for HardDrive's Live Spring Fling, beginning on April 13 at The Station in Broussard, Louisiana. On August 1, the band was announced alongside All That Remains and Hatebreed as supporting acts for Five Finger Death Punch on their Share The Welt Tour, starting on October 16 at San Francisco's Warfield Theatre and finishing on November 2 at the Diamond Ballroom in Oklahoma City. On October 10, the band had to leave the tour after guitarist Julien Jorgensen cut his left hand during a post-wedding reception in Las Vegas.

== Critical reception ==
Professional ratings
Review scores
Source	Rating
AllMusic	3/5 stars
Rock Eyez	4.5/5 stars
Sputnikmusic	2.5/5.0

Brian Rademacher of Rock Eyez gave praise to Lixx and Jorgensen's "hard driving guitar licks" throughout the track listing and Luzzi's vocal delivery for having a "raw yet smooth approach", highlighting "Dead in a Grave" and "Say Goodbye", concluding that: "This is a killer CD that needs to be added to your collection of modern rock. "Justice"... masterful, sophisticated, sensitive and warming yet can kick your ass too! Check it out." AllMusic's Gregory Heaney noted that the first couple of tracks showcase the album as a "no-nonsense affair" that keeps the energy up "before revealing its plaintive side ("Hollow Man" and "Say Goodbye")" concluding that: "Fans of the band and all who like their modern hard rock with more edge and less sensitivity will definitely enjoy what Rev Theory have to offer on their third outing." DaveyBoy of Sputnikmusic felt the band failed to "consistently integrate their heavier and catchier elements in a coherent or satisfying manner", criticizing the "haphazardly abundant" generic guitarwork and the songwriting for having "macho posturing" and "predictable themes", but gave mention to "The Fire", "Loaded Gun" and "Guilty by Design" for being "well-executed, catchy and sincere", concluding that: "What this all adds up to is Rev Theory - and their third LP 'Justice' - not scraping the bottom of the barrel when it comes to harder edged radio-rock, but also not capitalizing on whatever potential the quintet possess and rising to the top of the pack either. Even in this case, just being passable is still a disappointment."

== Track listing ==
All tracks are written by Rev Theory.

No.	Title	Length
1.	"Dead in a Grave"	3:59
2.	"Justice"	3:19
3.	"Hangman"	3:19
4.	"The Fire"	4:09
5.	"Loaded Gun"	3:20
6.	"Guilty by Design"	3:53
7.	"Enemy Within"	3:45
8.	"Wicked Wonderland"	3:45
9.	"Say Goodbye"	3:51
10.	"Never Again"	4:40
11.	"Hollow Man"	4:07
12.	"Justice" (remix featuring Jonathan Davis) (hidden track)	3:31
Total length:		42:13

F.Y.E. Exclusive Edition Bonus Tracks

1. “Hell Yeah (live)”
2. “Falling Down (acoustic live)”

== Charts ==
=== Album ===
Chart performance for Justice
Chart (2011)	Peak position
Canadian Albums (Nielsen SoundScan)	73
US Billboard 200	75
US Top Alternative Albums (Billboard)	11
US Top Hard Rock Albums (Billboard)	5
US Top Rock Albums (Billboard)	20

=== Singles ===
Chart performance of singles from Justice
Year	Single	Chart	Position
2011	"Justice"	US Hot Mainstream Rock Tracks	17
2011	"Justice"	US Rock Songs	38
