= Blue Mountain State =

2010 American television sitcom

- Genre: Sitcom
- Created by: Eric Falconer; Chris Romano
- Starring: Darin Brooks; Alan Ritchson; Page Kennedy; Sam Jones III; Chris Romano; Ed Marinaro; Frankie Shaw; Gabrielle Dennis; Denise Richards; Rob Ramsay; Omari Newton; Kwasi Songui; James Cade; Meghan Heffern
- Opening theme: "Hell Yeah" by Rev Theory
- Country of origin: United States
- Original language: English
- No. of seasons: 3
- No. of episodes: 39 (list of episodes)

Production
- Executive producers: Eric Falconer; Brian Robbins; Chris Romano; Sharla Sumpter Bridgett
- Producer: Madeleine Henrié
- Production locations: Sainte-Anne-de-Bellevue, Quebec; Montreal
- Running time: 21–22 mins
- Production companies: Falconer/Romanski Logo; Varsity Pictures; Lionsgate Television; SGF Entertainment Inc

Original release
- Network: Spike
- Release: January 11, 2010 – November 30, 2011

Blue Mountain State is an American television sitcom that premiered on Spike (now Paramount Network) on January 11, 2010. The series was created by Chris Romano and Eric Falconer and produced by Lionsgate Television. The series is about a fictitious university, Blue Mountain State, and its football team, the "Mountain Goats". It portrays certain aspects of American university life, including college football, sex, binge drinking, drugs, wild partying, and hazing. Over the years, due in large part to being streamable on Netflix, the series has developed a cult following.

In February 2012, it was reported that Blue Mountain State would not be renewed for a fourth season. On April 8, 2014, The BMS Movie was announced and a Kickstarter launched on April 15, 2014. The Kickstarter campaign reached its goal of $1.5 million on May 11, 2014, and the film was released in February 2016. In February 2024, Deadline reported that a revival of the series was in development, with stars Alan Ritchson, Darin Brooks, and Chris Romano all expected to return.

== Cast ==
| Name | Portrayed by | Position | Seasons | | |
| Name | Portrayed by | Position | 1 | 2 | 3 |
|---|---|---|---|---|---|
Main Cast
| Alex Moran | Darin Brooks | Quarterback | Second String | | Starter; Acting Capt. (1–3) |
| Kevin "Thad" Devlin Castle | Alan Ritchson | Linebacker | Starter; Capt. | | Starter; Capt. (4–13) |
| Craig Shilo | Sam Jones III | Running back | Starter | | |
| Radon Randell | Page Kennedy | Quarterback | | Starter | |
| Sampson "Sammy" Cacciatore | Chris Romano | Team Mascot | Billy the Mountain Goat | | |
| Mary Jo Cacciatore | Frankie Shaw | Cheerleader | | Cheerleader | |
| Denise Roy | Gabrielle Dennis | Craig Shilo's girlfriend | Student | | |
| Debra Simon | Denise Richards | Marty's Ex-wife | | Team supporter | |
| Martin "Marty" Daniels | Ed Marinaro | Head Coach | Head coach | | |
Recurring Cast
| Larry Summers | Omari Newton | Defensive back | Starter | | |
| Jonathan "Jon Jon" Hendricks | Kwasi Songui | Assistant Coach | Assistant coach | | |
| Donald "Donnie" Schrab | Rob Ramsay | Center | Starter | | |
| Harmon Tedesco | James Cade | Placekicker | Starting Kicker | | |
| Travis McKenna | Stephen Amell | Quarterback | Starter | | |
| Kate | Meghan Heffern | Cheerleader | Cheerleader | | |
| Marcus Gilday | Anthony Lemke | Offensive coordinator | | | Offensive Coordinator |

=== Main ===
- Alex Moran (Brooks): A Junior starting quarterback, acting Captain, from Cheyenne, Wyoming. Although a talented athlete and a natural leader, Alex prefers to spend his college days partying and having sex with coed girls.
- Sammy Cacciatore (Romano): The team mascot (Billy, The Mountain Goat Mascot) from Cheyenne, Wyoming and Alex's roommate, childhood friend, and Mary Jo's half-brother.
- Kevin "Thad" Castle (Ritchson): A Senior linebacker/team captain from Connecticut.
- Martin "Marty" Daniels (Marinaro): Marty is the coach for Blue Mountain State and a former NFL player.
- Radon Randell (Kennedy) (Starring Season 2) : Radon was the new freshman starting quarterback from Detroit. In season 3, it was revealed that he left the team after suffering a career-ending injury, which was caused by a shoulder injury in the later part of season 2.
- Craig Shilo (Jones) (Starring Season 1) : A running back from Columbus, Ohio. National High School Player of the Year, Craig Shilo, was the team's star freshman player. In season 2, it was revealed that he left the team after transferring to Georgia Tech.
- Denise Roy (Dennis) (Starring Season 1) : Denise is Craig Shilo's high school girlfriend. She dominates and controls Craig's life, forbidding him from any interactions with any other women, while at the same time regularly sleeping around with other men.
- Mary Jo Cacciatore (Shaw) (Starring Season 2, Recurring Season 3) : Mary Jo is Sammy's younger sister.
- Debra Simon (Richards) (Recurring Season 2; Starring Season 3): Debra is Marty's ex-wife and current girlfriend.

=== Recurring ===
- Harmon Tedesco (Cade): Harmon Tedesco is the drug-abusing kicker for the football team. Harmon exploits anything to get him high, from smoking weed to sticking ice rods up his rectum. Harmon lives at the Goat House with Thad, Alex, and Sammy.
- Donald "Donnie" Schrab (Ramsay): Donnie Schrab is the center for the Blue Mountain State football team. He is somewhat childish and very easygoing. Donnie lives in the Goat House. It was revealed in Blue Mountain State: The Rise of Thadland that Donnie is gay.
- Larry Summers (Newton): Larry lives in the Goat House, is Thad's best friend, and is often seen following him around. He has shown to do anything to help his team, even diving his finger up Thad's butt on Coach Daniels's orders.
- Jon Jon Hendrix (Sangui): Coach Jon Jon is Coach Daniels's best friend and second-in-command. He is extremely loyal to his boss
- Pauline (Chantal Quesnel) (seasons 1–2): Pauline is the resident cougar at the Blue Mountain State Goat house. She's had sex with all the football players and Sammy, as the team believes it brings them good luck. She lost her virginity years ago to the lacrosse team to broker a truce between the football and lacrosse players. In Season 2, she becomes pregnant and leaves a message at the Goat House. She ultimately decides to raise the baby on her own until it is announced that Coach Daniels is the father.
- Kate (Heffern): Kate is the Captain of the cheerleading squad. She has shown great disdain towards both Sammy and Mary Jo. In Season 2, it is revealed that she is Thad's personal cheerleader after she sprains her ankle, and makes Mary Jo fill in for her.
- Warren Simon (Atherton) (season 2): Warren is the dean of Blue Mountain State (Season 1's Dean Simon was portrayed by Guy Sprung). He was a nerd in his youth and resents Coach Daniels. He tried to humiliate Alex by holding a banquet in his honor and giving a speech on a paper he knew Alex didn't write, and he convinced the nerds to turn on the jocks. His plans were ruined by a prank led by Sammy. Warren was dating Debra, Daniels' ex-wife, but she and Daniels eventually got back together.
- Marcus Gilday (Lemke): Marcus is the new offensive coordinator of the Blue Mountain State football team. He schemed to take Daniels' job as head coach of the football team for the entire season; however, after an embarrassing loss as interim head coach following Daniels' suspension for the national championship, he and Daniels reconciled at the unofficial national championship in the season finale.

=== Cameos ===
- Annie Murphy
- Bill Romanowski
- Bill Parcells
- Brian Bosworth
- Boomer Esiason
- Craig Carton
- Chuck Liddell
- Chad Johnson
- Clay Travis
- Dan Patrick
- Stacy Keibler

== Seasons ==
| Season | Episodes | Originally aired | | | DVD release date | |
| Season | Episodes | Sneak preview | Season premiere | Season finale | Region 1 | Region 2 |
|---|---|---|---|---|---|---|
| 1 | 13 | —N/a | January 11, 2010 | March 30, 2010 | October 5, 2010 | August 22, 2011 |
| 2 | 13 | October 16, 2010 | October 20, 2010 | January 19, 2011 | September 13, 2011 | —N/a |
| 3 | 13 | September 17, 2011 | September 21, 2011 | November 30, 2011 | February 4, 2013 | —N/a |

== Reception ==
Metacritic gave the series 38 out of 100, from the four reviews it collected. Brian Lowry of Variety found that "Blue Mountain embraces that (crude comedy) aspect of Spike's mandate over all else – putting the bodily function/semi-nudity cart before the sitcom horse." Lowry also stated: "[Spike] has simply made this too-blue "Mountain" into a comedic molehill." Mark A. Perigard of the Boston Herald gave the series a favorable review saying, "Blue is also frequently funny in a raunchy American Pie way. It's a college comedy in which the guys want to get wasted and laid, in whatever order." Joe Walljasper of the Columbia Daily Tribune describes the series as appealing to those who viewed the film Porky's and "felt that the jokes were a little too high-brow.".

In its first season, the show averaged 949,000 viewers in its first six episodes while improving on the time slot by 165% among men 18–24. In its second season, its premiere drew a 1.34 rating in Men 18–34, up 34% compared to the first season average and was ranked No. 2 in its timeslot. Over the season, it showed significant ratings growth compared to season 1, delivering a +33% increase in Men 18–34, +50% in Men 18–24, and +14% in Men 18–49. Season 3 of Blue Mountain State started airing on September 21, 2011 on Spike.

The show has gathered a cult following after it was released on Netflix. Fans of the show often start petitions and Facebook pages to make Spike bring the show back for a fourth season. Many members of the cast, especially Page Kennedy, hinted at a reunion project in the month leading up to the announcement of the film. Kennedy made Vines and tweeted with show stars Darin Brooks, Alan Ritchson, Frankie Shaw, Chris Romano and Sam Jones III.

== Filming locations ==
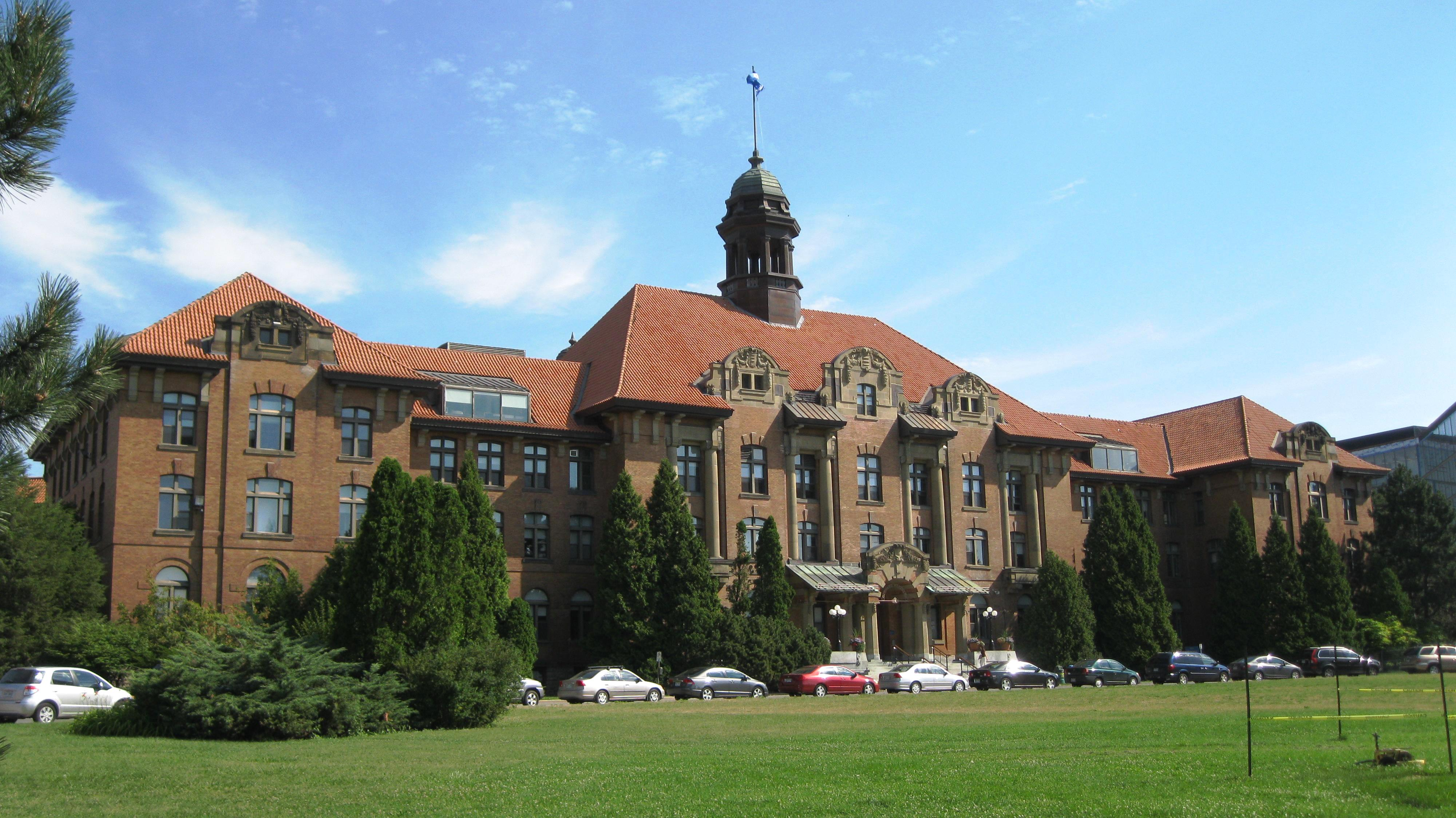
The Herzberg building on the John Abbott College campus, which doubles as Blue Mountain State University in the show.

- Olympic Stadium, Montreal, Quebec
- John Abbott College, Sainte-Anne-de-Bellevue, Quebec (Practice field) (Fraternity House Ext.)
- McGill University (Macdonald Campus), Sainte-Anne-de-Bellevue, Quebec (Dorm, Class Room)
- Lower Canada College (Chamandy Ice Rink), Montreal, Quebec (Ice Rink)
- Cunninghams Pub, Sainte-Anne-de-Bellevue, Quebec (Bar)
- Mel's studios (Fraternity House Interiors)

== Broadcast ==
The series premiered on Spike on January 11, 2010 in the United States. In Australia and New Zealand, the series airs on MTV Australia and MTV New Zealand, respectively, beginning April 22, 2010. The series began airing in the United Kingdom April 18, 2010 on MTV. MTV Germany and Viva (TV station) also broadcast the series with great success in Germany and The Netherlands. MTV Brasil began airing the series on August 3, 2010. The show also began airing on The Score in Canada in October 2011.

Season 3 began airing September 21, 2011, on Spike at 11 pm.

Currently, as of October 2025, BMS is available to stream on Netflix.

== Feature film ==
In March 2013, Ed Marinaro stated in an interview with Class Act Sports that he was working on a Blue Mountain State film. He continued to hint on Twitter at some 'behind-the-scenes' work being done on said movie. In early March 2014, Page Kennedy started hinting at Blue Mountain State reunion project on Instagram, Vine and Twitter along with Darin Brooks, Kelly Kruger (Darin's wife), Alan Ritchson, Sam Jones III, Frankie Shaw and Romanski.

On April 8, 2014, Blue Mountain State: The Movie was officially announced. To help make the announcement, Alan Ritchson, in character as Thad Castle, made a fake video featuring Jimmy Kimmel (the Kimmel footage was from a 2013 interview with Kanye West).

On April 15, the production launched a Kickstarter campaign, much like the hugely successful 2013 campaign by Veronica Mars to get the cancelled show made into a feature film. The project's goal was to raise $1.5 million by May 15 to fund the film. There were rewards for donating to the campaign, such as personalized tweets from the cast (for donating $10), shot and pint glasses with the BMS logo ($20), and a speaking role in the film (for a $10,000 donation).

On May 11, 2014, the Kickstarter goal of $1.5 million was reached. On May 15, 2014, the Kickstarter campaign ended, with the final funds raised being $1,911,827 from 23,999 backers.

In May 2014, it was announced Jay Chandrasekhar would be the director of the film. However, on September 28, 2014, Lev L. Spiro was announced as the new director of BMS: The Movie. The crew started filming in late 2014 on location in Wilmington, North Carolina. Filming was reportedly complete by December 14, 2014.

The film, titled Blue Mountain State: The Rise of Thadland, was officially released on February 2, 2016.
