= Romanski (surname) =

Romanski or Romansky is a Polish and/or Jewish toponymic habitational name deriving from places called Romany in Poland. Alternatively, the surname may derive from the given name Roman.

== Notable examples ==
- Charles Stephen Romanski (1943–1993), American actor, police officer, pilot, and model
- Dave Romansky (born 1938), American athlete
- Josh Romanski (born 1986), American baseball player
- Adele Romanski (born 1982), American Academy Award-winning film producer
- Richard Romanski (born 1928), American NFL Equipment Manager [Oakland Raiders]

== Fictional Characters ==
- Jayce and Jules Romansky, main protagonists of the Major Arcana series
