= Patch Town =

2014 Canadian dark fantasy comedy film

- theatrical poster
- Directed by: Craig Goodwill
- Written by: Christopher Bond; Jessie Gabe
- Produced by: Craig Goodwill
- Starring: Rob Ramsay; Julian Richings; Zoie Palmer; Suresh John; Ken Hall; Stephanie Pitsiladis
- Cinematography: Guy Godfree
- Edited by: Jeremy LaLonde
- Music by: Silvio Amato
- Production company: Popcorn Pictures
- Distributed by: Kino Lorber; Video Service Corporation
- Release dates: January 2014 (Palm Springs); June 5, 2015
- Running time: 85 minutes
- Country: Canada
- Languages: English, French

Patch Town is a 2014 Canadian dark fantasy comedy holiday film written by Christopher Bond and Jessie Gabe, and directed by Craig Goodwill. It features settings designed by Production Designer Matt Middleton. Originally an award-winning short film that inspired a much larger project, Patch Town stars actors Rob Ramsay, Julian Richings, Zoie Palmer, Suresh John, Stephanie Pitsiladis and Ken Hall in a quasi-musical about a fictional Soviet-style factory producing children's toys, run by a bitter and lonely executive officer named Yuri (Richings). When a factory employee named Jon (Ramsay) discovers a hidden secret about his past, he goes on a quest of trying to establish a real family for himself. Completed in 2014 and released in 2015, Patch Town received mixed reviews, but was praised for the cast's acting and the story's satirically grim take on United States 1980s consumer culture, and Soviet communism.

== Plot ==
Jon, an overweight factory worker, and his timid but strong-willed wife, Mary, live together as employees in a structured housing bloc in "Patch Town", a workers' village situated outside a toy factory known as Patch Enterprises. No employee has children, nor do they remember anything about their own childhoods. One night, as Jon prepares a baby doll for shipment (a process that actually involves removing the sentient, living dolls from magical cabbages grown on the factory grounds), he witnesses his co-worker being beaten by guards after getting caught stealing one of the cabbages. Jon notices Yuri, the shady factory owner, watching from nearby. He hurries home to meet Mary, revealing that he himself got away with successfully stealing one of the cabbages, in which came an infant baby that he and Mary have lovingly named "Daisy". They both watch from across the street as another married couple, who also stole a cabbage baby, have Yuri and his dwarf henchman Kenny dispose of the baby in a garbage dumpster, after which the couple is dragged away and imprisoned.

Jon plans to flee Patch Town with Mary and Daisy, and meets with Darryl, a black-market smuggler, who reveals a file containing information on Jon's "mother", Bethany, the young child who purchased him from a shopping mall in the 1980s. Jon realizes that he, Mary and all the other employees of Patch Town are living human-sized adults of their former doll selves. Darryl explains that Yuri's father, an elderly immigrant, discovered the magical cabbages outside an outhouse one night many years earlier, and brought the cabbage dolls to life using an invention he made. Yuri, then a young boy, felt rejected by his father. When his father suddenly died from an apparent heart attack, he gave the land and the magical cabbages to his son, hoping that Yuri would take care of the cabbage dolls. Instead, Yuri marketed them as toys. Hoping to meet the now adult Bethany, Jon takes Mary and Daisy to the outskirts of Patch Town and the three are smuggled out by Sly, a Hindi former employee of Patch Town who had been an unpopular doll model. Sly gives Jon candy for the first time, and drives them in his hippie van (disguised as a food delivery truck) to Toronto, giving them a cheap, creepy but safe apartment and promising to bring them some comfortable furnishings to make it seem more like a home.

Meanwhile, Yuri interrogates Darryl and a female prostitute from the local bar, and uses electroshock therapy to wipe their memories afterwards. He discovers the file on Bethany, and decides to have Kenny track the woman down. Kenny is beaten up by Bethany's preteen daughter, Avery, who is currently taking karate lessons, but Kenny manages to kidnap Avery anyway, leaving Bethany behind. Although Yuri is annoyed that Bethany was not captured, he decides to use Avery's likeness as a model for a more modern digital-age line of interactive dolls to keep Patch Enterprise up-to-date. Back in Toronto, Jon is hired on as a Santa Claus at a local shopping mall in order to earn his own money, while Sly joins in as a Christmas elf. Jon sees Bethany on a television screen at the mall, pleading for Avery's kidnappers to return her home. A gay couple shows Jon directions to Bethany's home, where he's promptly arrested by two R.C.M.P. officers who believe he is Avery's kidnapper after he claims to be Bethany's old childhood doll. Sly, who came along, is arrested, as well. Desperate for answers, Bethany decides to get the two out of jail in return for help in finding her daughter. Mary is angry with Jon, and Sly refuses to help, but eventually, they decide to join in for the sake of liberating the other employees of Patch Town, as well as Daisy.

Bethany is taken by Kenny and one of Yuri's other henchmen, and brought back to Patch Enterprises where she is told about the plan for Avery. Bethany is horrified upon learning that the doll-making process will kill Avery, but she feigns romantic attraction to Yuri in order to distract him so that Jon and Mary can infiltrate the factory. They find Darryl, his girlfriend, their married neighbours and the other employees all working, and gather them together in rebellion. Yuri realizes what has happened and prepares to fight back with the help of Kenny, but he breaks down crying when Jon confronts him, admitting that he only wanted a family of his own. Jon points out to Yuri that he already had a family in all of his employees, and the employees decide to use the electroshock therapy machine on Yuri himself to clear his memories and make him more docile. Bethany thanks Jon, and returns home with Avery after accepting a drive back to Toronto from Sly. Jon stays in Patch Town to start a new, free life with Mary and Daisy. Yuri is last seen singing a commercial jingle from Patch Enterprises in a slurred voice, while Kenny starts a romance with a surly career counsellor and gets a job after moving to Toronto himself.

== Cast ==
- Rob Ramsay as Jon
- Julian Richings as Yuri
- Zoie Palmer as Bethany
- Suresh John as Sly
- Ken Hall as Kenny
- Stephanie Pitsiladis as Mary
- Kayla DiVenere (as "Kayla Di Venere") as Avery
- Darryl Dinn as Darryl
- Allana Harkin as Detective Carlisle
- Tom Barnett as Detective Randall
- Shel Goldstein as Twink
- Jon Cor as Sergei
- Trevor Martin as Man at the Mall
- Mason Cardwell as Miles
- Jake Michaels as Max
- Steve Kaszas as Jebidiah
- A.C. Peterson (as "Alan C. Peterson") as Boss

(Richings also played the minor role of Yuri's father in a flashback scene, while actors Eden Gladstone Martin and Joe Delfin played younger versions of Yuri in the flashback scene).

== Reception ==
Patch Town has a 75% rating on Rotten Tomatoes indicating generally favourable reviews, with Chris Knight of National Post saying of the film, "It's hard not to find something to love in a film that mixes elements of Toy Story, Bad Santa, Russian folklore, Cabbage Patch Kids and Les Miserables," and Prairie Miller of WBAI Radio saying, "factory noir rears its head, when it comes to corporations, consumerism and the destructive pursuit of objects of materialistic desire." The Hollywood Reporter had a more critical reaction, stating of the acting, "Julian Richings is as wickedly skeletal as Jon [Ramsay] is obese... one-dimensional performances predominate, though Ken Hall breathes life into an evil henchman role." Peter Debruge of Variety praised the casting of Rob Ramsay as Jon for his Cabbage Patch Kids doll-like appearance, saying, "Ramsay looks the way one supposes such a cheeky cherub might a quarter-century later, right down to his yarn-like hairdo, though the actor is overshadowed by his community-theater background (unable to kick the habit of smiling while he sings) and under-equipped for emotional scenes (including a weird one in which he tastes candy for the first time)."

The film won the award for Best Feature Film at the 2014 Canadian Film Festival, and Guy Godfree won the award for Best Cinematography.

== Home media ==
Patch Town streams on Apple TV, and was also made available on DVD video in English and French from Video Service Corp in Canada.
