= Sydney Forest =

American composer and musician (born 1971)

- Born: September 8, 1971 (age 54); San Diego, California, U.S.
- Genres: Acoustic music, Indie, Rock
- Instruments: Vocals, guitar

Sydney Forest is an American composer and musician born on September 8, 1971. Her music has been featured in several films, most notably Studio Ghibli's English dub of Kiki's Delivery Service.

== Biography ==
Sydney Forest was born in San Diego, Sydney Forest is the daughter of Gayla Peevey. Upon entering into her career, Forest was signed to a deal with Disney Music Publishing shortly after she began gigging in Los Angeles. Her lyrics and music gained a great deal of attention including the National Academy of Songwriters’ Lionel Richie Songwriting Award. Later on, Forest appeared on the Warner Bros. network TV series Popular in which she had performed her own songs as melodic interludes.

== Discography ==
=== Studio albums ===
- Suburban Casualty (2005)

=== Soundtracks ===
- Autumn in New York (2000) (songs: “Our Love Never Ends”)
- Simply Irresistible (1999) (songs: “Once In A Blue Moon”)
- Popular (1999) (songs: “High School Highway”)
- Kiki's Delivery Service (1989) (songs: "Soaring" and "I'm Gonna Fly")

== Filmography ==
=== Television ===
- Popular

Episode: "The Phantom Menace" (1999) (Role: Herself)
