= Lev L. Spiro =

American film and television director

Lev. L. Spiro
- Born: United States
- Occupation: Director
- Years active: 1994–present
- Spouse: Melissa Rosenberg (m. 1995)

Lev L. Spiro is an American film and television director. His TV episodic work includes multiple Emmy Award-winning shows such as Modern Family, Weeds, Arrested Development, My Name Is Earl, Ugly Betty, Gilmore Girls, Dawson's Creek, The O.C. and Everybody Hates Chris. His film directing includes the DGA Award nominated Minutemen, the Emmy Award-winning Wizards of Waverly Place: The Movie, and the Lionsgate film Blue Mountain State: The Rise of Thadland (2016).

== Early life ==
Spiro earned dual bachelor's degrees in Political Science and Communication Arts from the University of Wisconsin–Madison. He then attended the University of Texas at Austin, where he received a master's degree in Film Production. His early work includes film adaptations of The Convict, a short story by James Lee Burke, and The Suicide Club, a story by Robert Louis Stevenson, which starred Jonathan Pryce and Paul Bettany.

== Career ==
Since beginning his career, Spiro has directed over 150 drama and comedy episodes, pilots and features for network and cable television.

Episodic television work includes multiple episodes of Showtime's Weeds, ABC's Ugly Betty and CW's Everybody Hates Chris, as well as Arrested Development, The O.C., Gilmore Girls and many more. In 2008, Spiro directed the critically acclaimed family feature Minutemen, which garnered a DGA Award nomination for Outstanding Directorial Achievement in Children's Programs. In 2009 he directed Wizards of Waverly Place: The Movie which won the Emmy Award for Outstanding Children's Program. More recently Spiro has directed episodes of Netflix's Orange is the New Black and Amazon's The Tick.

== Personal life ==
Spiro is married to screenwriter/producer Melissa Rosenberg.

== Directing credits ==
- Dolly Parton's Heartstrings (2019)
- Insatiable (2018)
- The Tick (2017)
- Daytime Divas (2017)
- Imaginary Mary (2017)
- Still the King (2016–17)
- Blue Mountain State: The Rise of Thadland (2016)
- Orange is the New Black (2015)
- UnREAL (2015)
- The Neighbors (2014)
- Modern Family (2013)
- Betas (2013)
- Don't Trust the B— in Apartment 23 (2012)
- Beverly Hills Chihuahua 3: Viva la Fiesta! (2012)
- Jane by Design (Pilot) (2011)
- Are We There Yet? (2011)
- Supah Ninjas (2011)
- Glory Daze (2010)
- Blue Mountain State (2010)
- Wizards of Waverly Place: The Movie (2009)
- Jonas (2009)
- Everybody Hates Chris (2008)
- Minutemen (2008)
- Weeds (2007)
- Ugly Betty (2007)
- Dirt (2007)
- Psych (2006)
- Pepper Dennis (2006)
- Arrested Development (2005)
- My Name Is Earl (2005)
- Point Pleasant (2005)
- Summerland (Pilot) (2004)
- The O.C.(2004)
- One Tree Hill (2004)
- Everwood (2003)
- Do Over (Pilot) (2002)
- Dawson's Creek (2001)
- Gilmore Girls (2001)
- Popular (2000)
- Arli$$ (2000)
- The Jersey (Pilot) (1999)
- Cousin Skeeter (1998)
- Welcome to Planet Earth (1996)

== Awards and nominations ==
- OFTA Awards (2013) Best Direction in a Comedy Series, for Modern Family
- Emmy Award (2010) Outstanding Children's Program, for Wizards of Waverly Place: The Movie
- Image Award Nomination (2010) Outstanding Children's Program, for Wizards of Waverly Place: The Movie
- DGA Award Nomination (2009) Outstanding Directorial Achievement in Children's Programs, for Minutemen
- OFTA Awards (2002) Best Direction in a Comedy Series, for Gilmore Girls
- Young Artist Awards (2000) Best Performance in a TV Series - Young Ensemble, for The Jersey
- GLAAD Media Award (2000) Outstanding TV Individual Episode for Popular "Wild Wild Mess"
