= Audrey Quock =

American model

- Born: September 25, 1977 (age 49); New York, New York, U.S.
- Modeling information
- Height: 5 ft 10 in (1.78 m)
- Hair color: Brown
- Eye color: Brown

Audrey Quock is an American model and actress.

== Biography ==
Quock was born in New York, New York, in Manhattan and is of Chinese descent. She is perhaps most famous for being a swimsuit model for Sports Illustrated. She has also modeled for Elle magazine and Cosmopolitan, and had roles in the movies Rush Hour 2, Autumn in New York, and After the Sunset. Quock served as a judge for the 2003 Miss Universe pageant.

She briefly ran a clothing line called "Sexy Little Things" beginning in 2004; however, the line was discontinued in 2006 when a court ruled that the mark "Sexy Little Things" was already in use by Victoria's Secret. Quock had been a freelance model for Victoria's Secret. Quock has a bachelor's degree in Fashion Design from the Fashion Institute of Technology in New York.
