= Kwasi Songui =

Canadian actor

- Born: Montreal, Quebec Canada
- Occupation: Actor
- Years active: 1998–present

Kwasi Songui (SONG-gwee) is a Canadian actor best known for his deep, commanding voice and roles of Persian from 300, Jon Jon Hendricks in Blue Mountain State, and Jimmy the Iceman from Nicky Deuce.

== Filmography ==
=== Film ===
Year	Title	Role	Notes
1998	Provocateur	Security Guard	
1998	Dead End	Officer Whitaker	
1999	The Intruder	Santa Claus	
2001	Les Boys 3	Phil's bouncer	
2001	The Warden	Yates	TV movie
2002	Redeemer	Pierce	
2002	The Rendering	Corrections Officer	TV movie
2002	Abandon	Campus Security Officer	
2002	The Sum of All Fears	Dockyard Navy Veteran	
2002	FeardotCom	Young Detective	
2002	Obsessed	Arresting Officer #2	TV movie
2003	Lost Junction	Bartender	
2003	Nightwaves	Paramedic	TV movie
2003	Gothika	Guard	
2003	The Reagans	Mitchell's Attorney	TV movie
2004	The Day After Tomorrow	Statue of Liberty Guard	
2004	The Last Casino	Tourist	TV movie
2004	Baby for Sale	Littiken	TV movie
2004	Life in the Balance	Prison Guard	
2004	The Wool Cap	Joe	
2004	When Angels Come to Town	Bus Driver	
2005	King's Ransom	Ronald	
2006	Lucky Number Slevin	Henchman	
2006	Proof of Lies	Security Guard #2	TV movie
2006	300	Persian	
2008	Swamp Devil	Bigg	
2010	Sortie 67	Max #2	
2010	Lance et compte	Bouncer club Detroit	
2011	Funkytown	Frère de Selma #1	
2012	Mirror Mirror	Noble #2	
2012	Deadfall	Corrections Officer	
2013	The Badge	Twitty	
2013	White House Down	North Gate Guard	
2014	Brick Mansions	Big Cecil	
2015	Stonewall	Big Daddy	
2015	The Walk	Man in Plaid Sports Coat	
2016	Dear Mr. President	Black Officer	Short
2016	Nine Lives	EMT #2	
2017	Redruby	Cook #1	Short
2018	Death Wish	Police Reception	
2018	The Hummingbird Project	Ray	
2019	It Must Be Heaven	New York Taxi Driver	
2021	The United States vs. Billie Holiday	Working Class Man	
2021	Crisis	Red	
2021	When Love Blooms	Dale	TV movie
2022	Moonfall	Security Guard #1	
2022	House of Chains	Officer Raul	TV movie
2022	Two Days Before Christmas	Commis autocar	
2023	Beau Is Afraid	Orphan Ladybug Man	

=== Television ===
Year	Title	Role	Notes
2010	The Mysteries of Alfred Hedgehog	Principal Thomas and Lumis	Recurring
2010-2012	Blue Mountain State	Jon Jon Hendricks	Season regular
2014	Being Human	"Brick Shithouse"	Recurring
2015-2016	Quantico	Ray McGinnis	2 episodes
2015-2016	Game On	Mr. Pollack	2 episodes
2016	L'Imposteur	Roméo	Episode: "La fête des pères"
2016	This Life	Immigration Interviewer	Episode: "Joyride"
2017	Fubar Age of Computer	Koffi	5 episodes
2018	The Detectives	Harold Pells	Episode: "Stranger Calling"
2018	Broken Trust	Kenneth	Episode: "The Landlord"
2019-2021	The Moodys	Big Stan	6 episodes
2020	The Bold Type	Roy	Episode: "Babes in Toyland"
2020	Kim's Convenience	Gus	Episode: "Which Witch is Which"
2021	Moose	Moose	Voice
2022	Transplant	Power Line Worker	Episode: "Fracture"

=== Video games ===
Year	Title	Role	Notes
2007	TMNT	Shredder	
2008	Tom Clancy's Rainbow Six: Vegas 2	Michael Walter	
2017	Assassin's Creed Origins	Rudjek	
2019	The Dark Pictures Anthology: Man of Medan	Olson	
2021	Marvel's Guardians of the Galaxy	Garek Blood	
2021	Riders Republic		
2022	Outriders	Tiago	
2023	The Outlast Trials		
2023	Assassin's Creed Mirage		
