= Autumn in New York (film) =

2000 film by Joan Chen

- Theatrical release poster
- Directed by: Joan Chen
- Written by: Allison Burnett
- Produced by: Amy Robinson; Gary Lucchesi; Tom Rosenberg
- Starring: Richard Gere; Winona Ryder; Anthony LaPaglia; Elaine Stritch; Vera Farmiga; Sherry Stringfield
- Cinematography: Gu Changwei
- Edited by: Ruby Yang
- Music by: Gabriel Yared
- Production companies: Metro-Goldwyn-Mayer Pictures; Lakeshore Entertainment
- Distributed by: MGM Distribution Co. (United States); Lakeshore Entertainment (International)
- Release date: August 11, 2000 (United States)
- Running time: 99 minutes
- Country: United States
- Language: English
- Budget: $45 million
- Box office: $90.7 million

Autumn in New York is a 2000 American romantic drama film directed by Joan Chen, written by Allison Burnett, and starring Richard Gere, Winona Ryder, Anthony LaPaglia, Elaine Stritch, Vera Farmiga, and Sherry Stringfield.

The film follows a successful middle-aged restaurateur and womanizer who falls in love with a terminally ill young woman. US distributor MGM took over the film from Chen and significantly re-edited the film, which also involved deleting a Ryder nude scene.

The film received generally negative reviews from critics and grossed $90.7 million worldwide against a $45 million budget.

== Plot ==
Will Keane is a successful 48-year-old restaurateur and womanizer. Free-spirited haberdasher Charlotte Fielding celebrates her 22nd birthday in his upscale Manhattan restaurant and he immediately notices her. Her grandmother introduces them. Will learns that Charlotte is the daughter of his ex-girlfriend Katy, who died in a car accident shortly after Charlotte's birth.

The next day, Will calls and asks Charlotte to make a hat for his date to an upcoming benefit dinner. When she delivers it to his apartment a few days later, he invites her to accompany him to the formal benefit under the guise that he had been stood up. They get to know each other and become lovers. The next morning while having breakfast on his terrace, Will explains that their relationship has no future. She acknowledges this, revealing she is dying of a heart condition.

The next day, they walk through the fall foliage in Central Park, and Charlotte takes Will's watch, saying she will return it when he forgets she has it. At his restaurant, they prepare a meal together for his staff and he begins to fall in love. Back at his apartment, Charlotte has an episode of severe chest pain and Will rushes her to the hospital. The doctor explains that her neuroblastoma, a rare illness in young adults, has produced a tumor near her heart. She is estimated to have only one year to live.

At a Halloween party, Will runs into a former girlfriend and they end up on the roof and have sex. Afterward, Charlotte suspects that he was unfaithful, which he at first denies but later admits. Devastated, Charlotte ends their relationship.

Will receives a letter from his illegitimate daughter Lisa Tyler whom he has never met. He goes to the museum where she works but finds himself unable to approach her. A few nights later, he finds Lisa in the lobby to his apartment, and they talk for the first time. Married and pregnant, she has become sentimental about parenthood and wanted to meet her own father. She tells him of a recurring dream in which her father says he is sorry for abandoning her. Will quietly asserts that he is sorry.

The next night, Charlotte returns home to find Will asleep in a chair in her bedroom. She tells him to leave while he apologizes and pleads for another chance. She cries as he holds her in his arms. Later, while skating at Rockefeller Center, she suddenly collapses. At the hospital, they are told the tumor has grown and she has only a few weeks left.

Over the next few days, Will frantically searches for a specialist to perform the complicated surgery to save Charlotte. After he asks Lisa for help, she finds a specialist who agrees to do so. On Christmas morning, Charlotte wakes up and hears Will decorating. As she prepares to bring him his Christmas gift, she collapses. Will rushes her to the hospital and calls the surgeon.

Will, friends, Lisa, and Charlotte's grandmother wait during the long hours of surgery. When the specialist emerges from the operating room, it is clear that he could not save her. Back at his apartment, Will finds Charlotte's Christmas gift to him on the floor—a small box with the hat stem she designed for him. Opening the box, he finds his watch she took from him on their first date. He stands at his window weeping with the box to his chest.

The following summer on a small boat on Central Park Lake, Will is holding his newborn grandson in his arms as Lisa looks on lovingly. He notices a swan and then a reflection in the water of a woman walking over the bridge.

== Cast ==
- Richard Gere as Will Keane
- Winona Ryder as Charlotte Fielding
- Anthony LaPaglia as John Volpe
- Elaine Stritch as Dolores "Dolly" Talbot
- Vera Farmiga as Lisa Tyler
- Sherry Stringfield as Sarah Volpe
- Jill Hennessy as Lynn McCale
- J. K. Simmons as Dr. Tom Grandy
- Sam Trammell as Simon
- Mary Beth Hurt as Dr. Paul Sibley
- Kali Rocha as Shannon
- Steven Randazzo as Alberto
- George Spielvogel III as Netto
- Ranjit Chowdhry as Fakir
- Audrey Quock as Eriko
- Tawny Cypress as Melissa
- Daniella van Graas as model at bar
- Rachel Nichols as model at bar
- Liza Lapira as Charlotte's birthday friend

== Production ==
The film was shot on location in Manhattan, New York City, with locations including the Bow Bridge in Central Park, the Alexander Hamilton U.S. Custom House, Rockefeller Center, Delmonico's, Carl Schurz Park, and Bellevue Hospital.

== Soundtrack ==
Autumn in New York (Original Soundtrack)

Soundtrack album by Gabriel Yared
- Released: July 25, 2000
- Genre: Score
- Label: Hollywood

The original soundtrack music for Autumn in New York was composed and conducted by Gabriel Yared and featured vocal performances by Jennifer Paige, Madeleine Peyroux, Yvonne Washington, Sydney Forest, and Miriam Stockley. It was produced by Mitchell Leib and Peter Afterman.

No.	Title	Performer(s)	Length
1.	"Beautiful"	Jennifer Paige	4:10
2.	"Getting Some Fun Out of Life"	Madeleine Peyroux	3:13
3.	"Autumn in New York"	Yvonne Washington	4:45
4.	"Our Love Never Ends"	Sydney Forest	4:06
5.	"Charlotte and Will"	Gabriel Yared	2:45
6.	"Autumn Forever"	Yared	3:39
7.	"Elegy for Charlotte"	Miriam Stockley	3:15
8.	"Autumn in New York (Opening Titles)"	Yared	2:09
9.	"First Kiss"	Yared	1:28
10.	"Memories"	Stockley	0:53
11.	"A Rude Awakening"	Yared	0:57
12.	"Walking Through the Park"	Yared	0:57
13.	"Lunch"	Yared	1:07
14.	"Thinking About Lisa"	Yared	0:57
15.	"Butterflies"	Yared	0:40
16.	"Break Up"	Yared	1:30
17.	"Thinking It Over"	Yared	1:06
18.	"Apart"	Yared	1:44
19.	"Can You Let Me Love You?"	Yared	2:59
20.	"Searching for a Doctor"	Yared	1:17
21.	"Katy"	Yared	1:04
22.	"The Chances for Success"	Yared	1:21
23.	"What Can I Give You?"	Yared	1:25
24.	"I Don't Want to Leave You"	Yared	2:09
25.	"First/Last Snow"	Stockley	1:26
26.	"To the Hospital"	Stockley	2:23
27.	"No Thing That Ever Flew"	Yared	2:59
28.	"The Gift"	Stockley	2:06

== Release ==
=== Home media ===
The film was released on VHS and DVD on January 2, 2001. It was released on Blu-ray on August 28, 2018, by MVD Entertainment Group.

== Reception ==
=== Box office ===
Autumn in New York grossed $37.8 million in the United States and Canada, and $52.9 million in other territories, for a worldwide total of $90.7 million, against a $45 million budget. In the United States and Canada, the film grossed $10.9 million from 2,255 theaters on its opening weekend, ranking fourth behind Hollow Man, Space Cowboys, and The Replacements.

=== Critical response ===
On the review aggregator website Rotten Tomatoes, 20% of 71 critics' reviews are positive, with an average rating of 4.3/10. The website's consensus reads: "Although the film isn't as bad as feared (it wasn't pre-screened for reviews), it's not that good, either. Most noticable [sic] flaws are the sappy romantic cliches and lack of chemistry between Gere and Ryder." Metacritic, which uses a weighted average, assigned the film a score of 24 out of 100, based on 21 critics, indicating "generally unfavorable" reviews. Audiences polled by CinemaScore gave the film an average grade of "C+" on an A+ to F scale.

Emanuel Levy of Variety gave the film a negative review, writing: "Autumn in New York is not a bad picture, just utterly banal. Desperately eager to register as a love affair in the mold of Hollywood's classics, Joan Chen's tediously sappy romantic meller is a kind of modern-day Love Story, with a 'new' twist: The casting of Richard Gere as a suave lover old enough to be Winona Ryder's father. MGM release, which went into theaters without a press screening, should enjoy a decent opening due to an aggressive marketing campaign targeted at young susceptible femmes, but tearjerker should be out of sight long before the season in which its pedestrian story is set."

Owen Gleiberman of Entertainment Weekly wrote: "It's unfortunate that the film was directed by Joan Chen, who made the shattering Xiu Xiu: The Sent Down Girl. The gentle humanism of Chen's touch is much in evidence here, yet she can't undo the howler at the movie's center – namely, that Gere's serial dater has conveniently chosen to fall in love with the one young woman in Manhattan who won't be around in six months anyway." Peter Rainer of New York wrote that Chen had a "lovely sense of film rhythm and a sophisticated eye for luxe effects, but she fell into a vat of goo and there's no climbing out of it".

=== Awards ===
The film was nominated for Worst Screen Couple (Gere and Ryder) at the 21st Golden Raspberry Awards, but lost the award to Battlefield Earth.
