= Rob Ramsay =

Canadian actor (born 1986)

- Born: Robert James Ramsay; Toronto, Ontario, Canada
- Occupation: Actor
- Years active: 2006–present
- Height: 6 ft 4 in (193 cm)

Robert James Ramsay is a Canadian actor. Ramsay is known for his roles as Donnie Schrab in Blue Mountain State, Percy Budnick in Aaron Stone, Barnabis in XIII: The Series and Jay Jay in Nickelodeon’s The Thundermans.

== Personal life ==
Robert James Ramsay was born in Toronto, Ontario, Canada. He grew up in both Toronto and Saint John, New Brunswick. In his youth, he performed in plays and musicals as well as playing for football teams in Toronto. These two passions never mixed until a casting director came to practice scouting football players to be in a movie called ‘It's a Boy Girl Thing’. On set, Ramsay was approached by the director who cast him in his first role.

Ramsay studied dramatic arts at Acadia University while simultaneously appearing on Disney’s ‘Aaron Stone’, ‘Pure Pwnage’ and ‘The Jon Dore Show’ for the Comedy Network.

In 2011, Ramsay was cast as the lead in ‘Patchtown’; a satirical, dark comedic short about “oppression, consumerism and a culture of discarded love”.

In 2014, Ramsay and the rest of the cast of Blue Mountain State raised $1.9 million on Kickstarter to make ‘Blue Mountain State: The Rise of Thadland’. Production started in November the same year.

== Filmography ==
| Year | Movie | Role |
|---|---|---|
| 2006 | It's a Boy Girl Thing | Team Guy #3 |
| 2010 | Cell 213 | Rory |
| 2011 | Patch Town (Short) | Jon |
| 2014 | Patch Town | Jon |
| 2015 | Blue Mountain State: The Rise of Thadland | Donald "Donnie" Schrab |
| 2015 | Rearview (Short) | Man |
| 2016 | First Round Down | Bobby |
| 2018 | Missy (Short) | Adam |
| 2019 | It Chapter Two | Meaner Nurse |
| 2019 | Popsy (Short) | Sheridan |
| 2024 | The Invisibles | Jimmy |

== TV Acting ==
| Year | Title | Role |
|---|---|---|
| 2007 | The Jon Dore Television Show | Chunks |
| 2009–2012 | Blue Mountain State | Donnie |
| 2010 | Aaron Stone | Percy Budnicks |
| 2010 | Pure Pwnage | Ruben |
| 2010 | The Listener | Aaron |
| 2010 | Mudpit | Phillipe |
| 2012 | XIII | Barnabis |
| 2013 | Satisfaction | Todd |
| 2014 | Darknet | Phillipe |
| 2014/15 | The Thundermans | Jay Jay |
| 2017-2019 | Anne with an E | Mr. Avery |
| 2018 | Private Eyes | Bob Sterling / King Lucien |
| 2018 | Star Falls | Extraminator |
| 2019 | What We Do in the Shadows | Biff |
| 2019 | Canadian Reflections | Adam |
| 2019 | Bigfoot | Orion |
| 2021 | Good Witch | Kyle Ritter |
| 2021 | In the Dark | Dougie |
| 2022 | Take Note | Max |
| 2022 | Hudson & Rex | Randy Kinneman |
