= Rev Theory =

American rock band

- From left to right: Agoglia, Luzzi, Jorgensen and McCloskey

Background information
- Also known as: Revelation Theory
- Origin: Long Island, New York, U.S.
- Genres: Hard rock; post-grunge; alternative metal
- Years active: 2002–present
- Labels: EMI; Interscope; Killer Tracks; Another Century; Sony
- Members: Matt McCloskey; Julien Jorgensen; Rich Luzzi; Dave Agoglia
- Past members: Rikki Lixx; Paul Phillips (touring)
- Website: revtheoryofficial.com

Rev Theory (formerly known as Revelation Theory) is an American rock band formed in 2002 in Long Island, New York. The band has released five studio albums: Truth Is Currency (2005), Light It Up (2008), Justice (2011), The Revelation (2016) and Salvation Nowhere (2024), as well as three EPs: Revelation Theory EP (2004), Acoustic Live from the Gibson Lounge (2009) and Take 'Em Out (2012). The band are most well-known for their work with World Wrestling Entertainment, with the songs "Light It Up", "Hell Yeah", and "Justice" being used as the theme songs for WrestleMania XXIV, One Night Stand 2008, and Extreme Rules 2011 respectively. The group also created the song "Voices", which has been used as the entrance theme for professional wrestler Randy Orton since May of 2008.

== History ==
=== Early years and Truth Is Currency (2002–2006) ===
Revelation Theory's initial members Rich Luzzi, Dave Agoglia, and Julien Jorgensen first met in 1997 at Merrimack College in North Andover, MA, and all moved to Long Island, NY in 2002 to pursue a career in music. A year later, bassist Matty McCloskey, a student at New York University, joined the band, completing the quartet. They recorded a demo EP and began touring; in 2005 they were tapped for the Girls Gone Wild Rocks America tour. The group then signed with EMI subsidiary Element Records, and released the album Truth Is Currency in 2005.

In 2005, the band toured with Sevendust and Hinder and a single from Truth Is Currency, "Slowburn", hit No. 27 on the US Mainstream Rock Tracks chart. In 2006, they toured extensively with Hinder, Buckcherry, and Evanescence, also touring with the latter band in Europe during the same year.

=== Light It Up and breakthrough (2007–2009) ===
In 2007, the band toured with Hinder again, as well as with Papa Roach and Buckcherry. Later in 2007, the band signed a major label deal with Interscope Records and began writing their second album Light It Up. During this time the band shortened their official name to Rev Theory. They began to substantially build their fan base when World Wrestling Entertainment started using their music for pay-per-view events; initially with "Light It Up", which was the official theme music for WrestleMania XXIV, followed immediately with the use of "Hell Yeah" as the official theme for One Night Stand (2008), which took place in June. Former WWE wrestler Ashley Massaro appeared in the official "Hell Yeah" music video. Also in 2008, Rich Luzzi provided vocals for the song "Voices", the entrance theme of WWE wrestler Randy Orton. The song is also the title track on Voices: WWE The Music, Vol. 9 album. On May 25, 2023, Rev Theory released an updated version of "Voices" via Bandcamp. The track was released a month later to all platforms on June 30, 2023. "Hell Yeah" was featured in the video game Madden NFL 09, and it was the goal song for the NHL's Winnipeg Jets.

That same year, Interscope, Geffen, A&M Records and Microsoft partnered together to premiere the band's new music video exclusively on the Xbox LIVE Video Store. This made Rev Theory's single "Hell Yeah" the first ever video premiere on Xbox LIVE.

Rev Theory spent the end of 2008 opening for Hinder and Trapt on the Jägermeister Music Tour. The single "Light It Up" was included as part of the "hard rock package" as downloadable content in Guitar Hero: World Tour for the Xbox 360, PlayStation 3 and Wii versions of the game.

In January 2009, Rev Theory began touring with Theory of a Deadman and Ten Second Epic, and in May toured with Buckcherry, Avenged Sevenfold, and Papa Roach. Rev Theory then toured as part of Crüe Fest 2 before touring throughout the fall of 2009 with such bands as Seether and Breaking Benjamin.

In October 2009, Rev Theory began touring with Lynyrd Skynyrd. Rev Theory's song "Hell Yeah" was played during the opening and closing credits of the Spike TV college show Blue Mountain State.

=== Justice (2010–2012) ===
In February 2010, the band started writing new material for their third studio album with producer Terry Date. The title track and first single from the album, "Justice," was released on iTunes on October 25, 2010, and was released to radio stations on November 2, 2010. The band's song "Hangman" from the album Justice was used as a theme song for WWE SmackDown when the show made its debut on their new network home Syfy. "Justice" was also named the official theme song to the 2011 WWE pay-per-view event, Extreme Rules. Justice was released on February 15, 2011, and debuted on the Billboard top 200 charts at No. 75.

To support the "Justice" album, Rev Theory went on tour from April 13 to May 13, 2011, opening for Saliva, on Saliva's HardDrive Spring Tour. Rev Theory then went on a four-date tour with Black Label Society on their Uranium Tour. The band headlined their first national U.S. tour with Monster Energy Outbreak Presents from February 16 to March 6. Rev Theory also toured with Puddle of Mudd in 2011. Rev Theory was scheduled to go on tour with Hatebreed, All That Remains, and Five Finger Death Punch from October 13 to December 14, but had to cancel due to Julien Jorgensen's hand injury.

On April 12, 2012, Rev Theory posted on their Facebook Page that Rikki Lixx would no longer be a part of their band, stating "We've parted ways on good terms and we wish him nothing but success in his creative endeavors. We love Rikki and he will always be our friend and our brother."

=== Take 'Em Out and The Revelation (2012–present) ===
On November 1, 2012, Rev Theory announced that they were putting out a new EP titled Take 'Em Out, through Universal Music Group's specialty licensing label/publisher Killer Tracks. The EP, which featured four songs produced by Wax Ltd, was also released commercially online through digital retailers and streaming sites, including iTunes and Spotify. The song "Something New" gained considerable popularity online due in part to a high number of synchronization uses in media as well as a lyric video produced by The Uprising Creative. The "Something New" lyric video was premiered by Monster Energy and was later featured by VEVO.

The band spent most of 2013 promoting their Take 'Em Out EP and recording songs for a new studio album. On August 10, 2013, the band released a street track called "Alpha King" along with another lyric video. The "Alpha King" lyric video premiered on Loudwire.com.

On February 20, 2014, the band teased a song online from their forthcoming studio album called "Red Light Queen" on Loudwire.com, along with an announcement that Paul Phillips (formerly with Puddle of Mudd) would be joining the band as lead guitarist on future tour dates.

On April 6, 2014, the band performed Randy Orton's theme song "Voices" live at WrestleMania XXX as Randy Orton entered the arena to defend the WWE World Heavyweight Championship.

In August 2014, Rev Theory signed with Century Media/Sony Music imprint Another Century and also announced their first digital single with the label, "Born 2 Destroy." On September 19, 2014, the label premiered the official lyric video of "Born 2 Destroy" on Loudwire.com and on September 30, 2014, "Born 2 Destroy" was officially released as a digital single through online retailers like iTunes.

In October 2015, WWE chose the song "We Own The Night" as the main theme song for the new WWE Network series "Breaking Ground." On January 8, 2016, "We Own The Night" was released as a digital single through online retailers like iTunes and streaming services like Spotify.

On September 9, 2016, Rev Theory released their fourth full-length studio album, The Revelation, worldwide through Another Century Records, a division of Sony Music Entertainment.

=== 2019–2021 ===
From 2019 to 2021, Julien Jorgensen and Matthew McCloskey with The DNS Agency self-released a number of singles and grew their monthly listenership on Spotify from 500K to over 1 Million with Bassist Matty McCloskey singing lead. Drop the Hammer, ONE, ONE remix, Make me a Drink, Fire in the Sky, and Remember Me, which the two members also produced a full video for. The songs released during this time garnered over 5 million streams worldwide.

=== Salvation Nowhere ===
In 2023, founding member Julien Jorgensen took the initiative to re-record the WWE theme 'Voices', and was released along with a video in June 2023 and within a month the song received over 1 million listeners. The band would release their fifth studio album titled Salvation Nowhere on November 29, 2024

== Band members ==
Current members

- Matty McCloskey – bass (2002–present), lead vocals (2016–2023), backing vocals (2002-present)
- Julien Jorgensen – rhythm guitar (2002–present); lead guitar (2002–2006, 2012–2014)
- Rich Luzzi – lead vocals (2002–2016, 2023–present)
- Dave Agoglia – drums (2002-2016, 2023–present)

Past members

- Paul Phillips – lead guitar (touring) (2014–2016)
- Rikki Lixx – lead guitar, backing vocals (2006–2012)

== Discography ==
=== Studio albums ===
as Revelation Theory

- Truth Is Currency (2005)

as Rev Theory

- Light It Up (2008)
- Justice (2011)
- The Revelation (2016)
- Salvation Nowhere (2024)

with Darth Marley

- No Thing Is Real (2024)

=== EPs ===
- Revelation Theory EP (2004)
- Acoustic Live from the Gibson Lounge (2009)
- Take 'Em Out (2012)

=== Singles ===
Year	Title	US Main	US Rock	Album
2005	"Slowburn"	27	—	Truth Is Currency
2006	"Selfish and Cold"	—	—	Truth Is Currency
2008	"Hell Yeah"	18	—	Light It Up
2008	"Light It Up"	25	—	Light It Up
2009	"Far from Over"	15	36	Light It Up
2010	"Broken Bones"	34	—	Light It Up
2010	"Justice"	17	38	Justice
2011	"The Fire"	27	×	Justice
2012	"Something New"	—	×	Take 'Em Out
2014	"Born 2 Destroy"	40	×	
2016	"Guns"	×	×	The Revelation
2016	"Piece of Me"	×	×	The Revelation
2019	"Drop The Hammer"	×	×	Salvation Nowhere
2019	"Live to Die"	×	×	Salvation Nowhere
2019	"My Way" (cover)	×	×	
2020	"We Own the Night (Eyota Remix)"	×	×	
2020	"ONE"	×	×	
2020	"ONE" – A Violent Idol Remix	×	×	Salvation Nowhere
2020	"Prophet$"	×	×	Salvation Nowhere
2020	"Remember Me"	×	×	Salvation Nowhere
2021	"Make Me a Drink"	×	×	Salvation Nowhere
2021	"Make Me a Drink" Plastic Cinema Remix	×	×	Salvation Nowhere
2021	"Urinal Rodeo" (Feat Heidi Shepherd)	×	×	
2021	"Fire In The Sky"	×	×	Salvation Nowhere
2023	"Voices" (Randy Orton)	×	×	Salvation Nowhere
2023	"Wildlife"	×	×	Salvation Nowhere
2024	"Remedy"	×	×	Salvation Nowhere
2024	"Keep Me High" (with Darth Marley)	×	×	No Thing Is Real
2024	"Blinding Lights" (with Darth Marley)	×	×	No Thing Is Real
2024	"Ya Burn" (with Darth Marley)	×	×	No Thing Is Real
2024	"Forget Me" (with Darth Marley)	×	×	No Thing Is Real
2024	"Addicted To You" (with Darth Marley)	×	×	Save Yourself First
2025	"Interstellar Love" (with Darth Marley)	×	×	Save Yourself First
2025	"Love Is a Drug" (with Darth Marley)	×	×	
"—" denotes a release that did not chart.

== In other media ==
- 2008 – WWE WrestleMania 24 – "Light It Up" was used as the event's theme song.
- 2008 – WWE One Night Stand 2008 – "Hell Yeah" was used as the event's theme song.
- 2008 to present – "Voices" is currently being used by WWE wrestler Randy Orton as his entrance theme
- 2008 – NASCAR 09 – "Light It Up" was featured in the video game.
- 2009 – Madden NFL 09 – "Hell Yeah" was featured in the video game.
- 2009 – Guitar Hero: World Tour – "Light It Up" was included as part of the hard rock download package.
- 2010 to 2011 – Blue Mountain State – "Hell Yeah" was used as the main theme in the opening title sequence.
- 2011 – WWE Extreme Rules 2011 – "Justice" was used as the event's theme song.
- 2014 – WWE WrestleMania XXX – Rev Theory performed Randy Orton's theme song "Voices" live during the broadcast.
- 2014 – ESPN Deportes – "Something New" was used in a campaign promoting the European football tournament, the UEFA Champions League.
- 2014 – Kawasaki – "Something New" was used in a campaign for the 2015 Kawasaki Z300 motorcycle.
- 2015 to 2016 – WWE Network – "We Own The Night" was the main theme song for the reality series "Breaking Ground."
