= Revelation Theory (EP) =

EP by Revelation Theory
- Released: February 23, 2004
- Genre: Hard rock, alternative metal
- Length: 22:22
- Label: Independent

Revelation Theory chronology
Revelation Theory (2004)	Truth Is Currency (2005)

Revelation Theory EP is the first EP by Rev Theory, who were at the time known as Revelation Theory, released in 2004 independently. The songs have a rougher sound, as this was likely a demo.

== Track listing ==
1. "Deep Six" - 3:36
2. "Undone" - 3:39
3. "Fade" - 4:10
4. "Loathe" - 3:46
5. "Over It All" - 3:51
6. "Far from Home" - 3:20
