= List of Popular (TV series) episodes =

This page lists the episodes of the 1999–2001 television comedy-drama Popular. There were a total of 43 episodes in this series.

== Series overview ==
Season	Episodes	Originally released	
Season	Episodes	First released	Last released
1	22	September 29, 1999	May 18, 2000
2	21	September 22, 2000	May 18, 2001

== Episodes ==
=== Season 1 (1999–2000) ===
No. overall	No. in season	Title	Directed by	Written by	Original release date	Prod. code	Viewers (millions)
1	1	"Popular, Round One"	Brian Robbins	Ryan Murphy	September 29, 1999	P-801	4.96
2	2	"Mo' Menace, Mo' Problems"	Michael M. Robin	Ryan Murphy	September 30, 1999	P-802	3.29
3	3	"Under Siege"	Perry Lang	Ryan Murphy	October 7, 1999	P-803	3.93
4	4	"Windstruck"	Jamie Babbit	Oliver Goldstick	October 14, 1999	P-804	3.39
5	5	"Slumber Party Massacre"	Michael M. Robin	Wendy MacLeod	October 21, 1999	P-805	3.42
6	6	"Truth or Consequences"	Marc Buckland	Ari Posner & Eric Preven	November 4, 1999	P-806	3.46
7	7	"Queen B."	Matthew Harrison	Ryan Murphy	November 11, 1999	P-807	3.43
8	8	"Tonight's the Night"	Jamie Babbit	Edward Kitsis & Adam Horowitz and Ryan Murphy	November 18, 1999	P-808	3.68
9	9	"Wild Wild Mess"	Lev L. Spiro	Oliver Goldstick	December 2, 1999	P-809	3.52
10	10	"Fall on Your Knees"	Elodie Keene	Ryan Murphy	December 9, 1999	P-810	3.36
11	11	"Ex, Lies and Videotape"	Arvin Brown	Ari Posner & Eric Preven	January 13, 2000	P-811	2.92
12	12	"The Trial of Emory Dick"	Perry Lang	Oliver Goldstick	January 20, 2000	P-812	3.24
13	13	"Hope in a Jar"	David Petrarca	Wendy MacLeod	January 27, 2000	P-813	4.31
14	14	"Caged!"	Jamie Babbit	Ryan Murphy	February 3, 2000	P-814	3.04
15	15	"Booty Camp"	Michael M. Robin	Edward Kitsis & Adam Horowitz	February 10, 2000	P-815	3.08
16	16	"All About Adam"	Perry Lang	Wendy MacLeod & Ryan Murphy	February 17, 2000	P-816	2.98
17	17	"Lord of the Files"	Lev L. Spiro	Oliver Goldstick	February 24, 2000	P-817	3.33
18	18	"Ch-Ch-Changes"	Craig Zisk	Ari Posner & Eric Preven	April 20, 2000	P-818	2.29
19	19	"Hard on the Outside, Soft in the Middle"	Jamie Babbit	Ryan Murphy	April 27, 2000	P-819	2.59
20	20	"We Are Family"	Elodie Keene	Ryan Murphy & Deidre Strohm	May 4, 2000	P-820	2.09
21	21	"What Makes Sammy Run"	Jamie Babbit	Edward Kitsis & Adam Horowitz	May 11, 2000	P-821	2.12
22	22	"Two Weddings and a Funeral"	Lev L. Spiro	Ryan Murphy	May 18, 2000	P-822	2.38

=== Season 2 (2000–2001) ===
No. overall	No. in season	Title	Directed by	Written by	Original release date	Prod. code	Viewers (millions)
23	1	"Timber!"	Jamie Babbit	Ryan Murphy	September 22, 2000	P-823	1.91
24	2	"Baby, Don't Do It"	Michael M. Robin	Edward Kitsis & Adam Horowitz	September 29, 2000	P-824	2.22
25	3	"Citizen Shame"	Lev L. Spiro	Oliver Goldstick	October 6, 2000	P-825	2.98
26	4	"The Sweetest Taboo"	Craig Zisk	Ari Posner & Eric Preven	October 13, 2000	P-826	2.33
27	5	"Joe Loves Mary Cherry"	Jamie Babbit	James Duff & Ryan Murphy	October 20, 2000	P-827	2.35
28	6	"Style and Substance Abuse (Part 1 of 2)"	Elodie Keene	Ryan Murphy	November 3, 2000	P-828	3.28
29	7	"Ur-ine Trouble (Part 2 of 2)"	Michael M. Robin	Edward Kitsis & Adam Horowitz	November 10, 2000	P-829	2.79
30	8	"Misery Loathes Company"	Craig Zisk	Oliver Goldstick & Deidre Strohm	November 17, 2000	P-830	3.39
31	9	"Are You There God? It's Me, Ann-Margret"	Aaron E. Schneider	Oliver Goldstick	December 8, 2000	P-831	2.99
32	10	"The Consequences of Falling"	Michael M. Robin	Ryan Murphy	December 15, 2000	P-832	2.36
33	11	"Fire in the Hole"	Randy Miller	Ari Posner & Eric Preven	January 19, 2001	P-833	2.45
34	12	"The Shocking Possession"	Jamie Babbit	Edward Kitsis & Adam Horowitz	January 26, 2001	P-834	2.80
35	13	"Mary Charity"	Lawrence Trilling	James Duff	February 2, 2001	P-835	2.61
36	14	"The News of My Death Has Been Greatly Exaggerated"	Ryan Murphy	Ryan Murphy	February 23, 2001	P-836	2.36
37	15	"It's Greek to Me"	Jamie Babbit	Edward Kitsis & Adam Horowitz	March 2, 2001	P-837	2.65
38	16	"Flag"	Elodie Keene	Deidre Strohm	March 9, 2001	P-838	2.38
39	17	"Coup"	Jamie Babbit	Ari Posner & Eric Preven	March 16, 2001	P-839	2.21
40	18	"The Brain Game"	Craig Zisk	James Duff	April 27, 2001	P-840	1.97
41	19	"I Know What You Did Last Spring Break!"	Ryan Murphy	Story by : Ryan Murphy & Tim Wollaston; Teleplay by : Ryan Murphy	May 4, 2001	P-841	2.67
42	20	"You Don't Tug on Superman's Cape... You Don't Spit Into the Wind... You Don't Pull the Mask Off the Ol' Lone Ranger... And You Don't Mess Around with Big Bertha Muffin"	Lawrence Trilling	Edward Kitsis & Adam Horowitz	May 11, 2001	P-842	2.29
43	21	"Promblems"	Jamie Babbit	Ryan Murphy	May 18, 2001	P-843	2.62

== Ratings ==
Popular : U.S. viewers per episode (millions)

Season	Episode number																					
Season	1	2	3	4	5	6	7	8	9	10	11	12	13	14	15	16	17	18	19	20	21	22
1	4.96	3.29	3.93	3.39	3.42	3.46	3.43	3.68	3.52	3.36	2.92	3.24	4.31	3.04	3.08	2.98	3.33	2.29	2.59	2.09	2.12	2.38
2	1.91	2.22	2.98	2.33	2.35	3.28	2.79	3.39	2.99	2.36	2.45	2.80	2.61	2.36	2.65	2.38	2.21	1.97	2.67	2.29	2.62	–

Audience measurement performed by Nielsen Media Research (Note: The viewership statistics in the graph and table are sourced from the citations in the season-specific tables above.)
