= Popular (TV series) =

American teenage comedy-drama television series (1999-2001)

- Genre: Teen drama; Comedy drama
- Created by: Ryan Murphy; Gina Matthews
- Starring: Leslie Bibb; Carly Pope; Tamara Mello; Christopher Gorham; Sara Rue; Bryce Johnson; Tammy Lynn Michaels; Ron Lester; Leslie Grossman; Lisa Darr; Scott Bryce; Diane Delano
- Opening theme: "Supermodels" by Kendall Payne
- Ending theme: "High School Highway" by Sydney Forest
- Country of origin: United States
- Original language: English
- No. of seasons: 2
- No. of episodes: 43 (list of episodes)

Production
- Executive producers: Ryan Murphy; Gina Matthews; Greer Shephard; Michael M. Robin
- Producer: Phillip M. Goldfarb
- Cinematography: Christopher Baffa
- Camera setup: Single-camera
- Running time: 44 minutes
- Production companies: Ryan Murphy Productions; Roundtable Ink; The Shephard/Robin Company; Touchstone Television

Original release
- Network: The WB
- Release: September 29, 1999 – May 18, 2001

Popular is an American teen comedy-drama television series that aired on The WB, created by Ryan Murphy and Gina Matthews, starring Leslie Bibb and Carly Pope as two teenage girls who reside on opposite ends of the popularity spectrum at their high school, but are forced to get along when their single parents meet on a cruise ship and get married. The show was produced by Touchstone Television and ran for two seasons on The WB from September 29, 1999, to May 18, 2001.

== Plot ==
Brooke McQueen (Leslie Bibb) and Sam McPherson (Carly Pope), students at Jacqueline Kennedy High School, are polar opposites. Brooke is a popular cheerleader and Sam is an unpopular reporter for the school newspaper. Their respective groups are forced to socialize when Brooke's father and Sam's mother get engaged and the two girls have to share a house.

The plot of the first season revolves around the girls' school life, rival groups of friends, mutual animosity and plan to separate their parents. At the end of the season, Sam finds Brooke's real mother and encourages her to come back to town, which breaks up the engagement and splits the new family apart.

By the second season, Brooke and Sam realize that their parents were happy together, and therefore team up to reunite them, a move which results in the girls slowly becoming close friends, and even referring to each other as "family", though tensions rise when they both get involved with the same boy. Also, a reversal of fortunes takes place, with Brooke resigning from cheerleading to focus on her studies, and Sam experiencing a surge of sudden popularity at school. In the end of the second-season finale – which turned out to be the unexpected series finale when the show was cancelled – Brooke is run over by a drunk and angry Nicole Julian (Tammy Lynn Michaels).

== Cast ==
=== Main cast ===
- Brooke McQueen (Leslie Bibb) – She is the most popular girl at Kennedy High. She is beautiful, fashionable, a straight-A student and a cheerleader. An only child whose mother abandoned the family when Brooke was eight years old, she lives alone with her father until the merging of the McQueen and McPherson families. Brooke becomes a half-sister to newborn baby girl, MacKenzie, whom her stepmother gave birth to towards the end of the series. Though she strives to appear perfect, over the course of the two seasons, Brooke reveals her anxiety and low self-esteem on a number of occasions. She struggles with both Anorexia and unresolved grief over her mother's abandonment. Brooke spends a good portion of the series romantically involved with football player Josh Ford, but also develops a relationship with Harrison John, a childhood friend from whom she had grown apart due to their opposite social status. She mentions "thinking about" an attraction to girls, though this was never developed further. Brooke is compassionate, kind and socially aware, though occasionally lacks confidence in her convictions, and is capable of spiteful and petty behavior when she is unhappy and can be ruthless when she is angry. Her complex and initially hostile/eventually close relationship with Sam McPherson is one of the cornerstones of the series. She was run down by Nicole in an angry drunken rage in the Season 2 finale, leaving her fate unknown. Director and writer Ryan Murphy named this character after his niece Brooke Murphy.
- Samantha "Sam" McPherson (Carly Pope) – She is intelligent and determined, Sam McPherson is strong-willed, articulate and very stubborn. Sam's father died when she was fourteen. An only child, she lives alone with her mother until the merging of the McPherson and McQueen families. After her mother gives birth to her and Brooke's father's baby, Sam becomes a half-sister to baby girl MacKenzie. Sam is one of the "unpopular" girls at Kennedy High, along with her best friends Harrison, Carmen, and Lily, a situation that changes when she and Brooke McQueen begin living together. Sam is the editor of the school paper (although as the series progressed, the paper ceased being mentioned) and often wrote stories that exposed hypocrisy and unfairness at Kennedy High. She dates football player George Austin, but eventually discovers feelings for longtime best friend Harrison John after he confesses his love for her. Sam is funny, passionate and has an oft-voiced social conscience, but is quick to anger and slow to let go of hostility. She is also painfully insecure and masks this with a prickly attitude. Her complex and initially hostile/eventually close relationship with Brooke McQueen is one of the cornerstones of the series.
- Lily Esposito (Tamara Mello) – She is the epitome of an activist. She's considered to be a part of the unpopular crowd, along with her best friends Sam, Carmen, and Harrison. She was confused about her sexuality, but eventually settled into a relationship with Josh Ford. Lily is a vegetarian and passionately committed to both animal rights and social causes. She marries her first love, Josh Ford, towards the end of the series but realizes that married life is not what she thought it would be.
- Harrison John (Christopher Gorham) – He is an intelligent yet socially awkward "unpopular" guy who lives with his gay mother after the divorce of his parents. Harrison has had a crush on Brooke McQueen since they were children, one that is eventually reciprocated, but ends up torn when he reveals that he also has feelings for his best friend, Sam McPherson. In the second season, Harrison suffers from leukemia, and while in bed rest at the hospital, becomes good friends with his roommate Clarence. Clarence dies in "The Consequences of Falling", but comes back as an angel, to provide a suicidal Harrison with reasons why he should not jump off the hospital rooftop. Harrison returns to his room later expecting to die, but survives after a bone marrow transplant from Nicole Julian. Popular but unstable cheerleader Mary Cherry has a crush on Harrison, who she erroneously and consistently refers to as "Joe". Harrison is often portrayed as both happy with and alarmed by the fact that his closest friends are all female, and struggles in his interaction with other guys, though eventually develops tentative friendships with popular footballers Josh Ford and Sugar Daddy. By the end of the series, both Brooke and Sam ask Harrison to the Junior prom but eventually realize that it would not work. Harrison is forced to choose between Brooke and Sam while they both sit across from him waiting for his answer. The audience never hears Harrison's answer, although it is heavily implied from the series finale's ending he chose Sam.
- Carmen Ferrara (Sara Rue) – She is a cute but plain and overweight unpopular girl along with her best friends Sam, Lily, and Harrison. She is initially rejected from the cheerleading squad due to her weight, but later becomes co-captain of the Glamazons after a change of heart from Nicole. Throughout both series Carmen's character swings between that of a loyal friend and someone who is determined to achieve her goals despite her friends' reactions. She dates Josh Ford in Season 1 until he breaks up with her. Carmen suffers a pregnancy scare and has an abusive, alcoholic mother. Carmen was a headlined character for both seasons, but her inclusion in main storylines diminished as the final season aired.
- Josh Ford (Bryce Johnson) – He is the quarterback of the football team and all-around "popular" guy of the school. He dates Brooke McQueen, Carmen Fererra and Lily Esposito and is best friends with Sugar Daddy. Josh is artistically talented and appears as the lead in two school productions, though he struggles with his school work. Initially presented as good-natured but rather vacuous, Josh develops a social conscience due to his relationship with activist Lily, and helps her with various causes. Josh and Lily get married but struggle with both finances and the non-existent sexual nature of their relationship. In the final episode of the series, Josh and Lily realize that married life is not what they thought it would be. After a bad day, Josh tells Lily that he does not think they will be okay.
- Nicole Julian (Tammy Lynn Michaels) – She is a beautiful, chic, power-hungry cheerleader who consistently manipulates others for her own gain, and is personally responsible for most of the major friction which occurs at Kennedy High School. She is generally seen as a very cold-hearted and conniving young woman, but has proved herself to be very insecure. She is the on-again, off-again best friend of the popular Brooke McQueen. Early in the series, she reveals that she is jealous of Brooke by sleeping with Brooke's ex-boyfriend, Josh Ford, and would love to overtake her popular status. Despite her frivolous, sociopathic tendencies, during the course of the show, Nicole displays her softer side on many occasions, revealing a surprisingly vulnerable and sad person underneath, due to her alcoholic mother's constant criticism and the discovery that she was adopted. Her most generous moment in the series was when she donated bone marrow to Harrison to help save his life, surprising everyone with her selflessness. Her devious tactics usually allow her to get her way, at the cost of alienating the other characters. She is a highly promiscuous young woman who isn't afraid, for instance, to pole dance in front of a group of strangers. When her Machiavellian schemes eventually fail her in the end, and Brooke has had enough and chooses her relationship with Sam over Nicole, an angry, drunk and jealous Nicole ends the series in a defining way by deliberately running Brooke down in her car. Director and writer Ryan Murphy named this character after his niece Brooke Murphy's best friend Nicole Moore.
- Michael "Sugar Daddy" Bernardino (Ron Lester) – The wannabe-gangster of the popular group. He is best friends with Josh and is on the football team. He has problems with his weight and does not think he will ever be loved by a woman until he meets and eventually dates exchange student Exquisite Woo. In season one he has a very brief relationship with Mary Cherry and meets a girl online, that in fact is Carmen.
- Mary Cherry (Leslie Grossman) – She always referred to by both herself and all other characters with both names, Mary is an idiotic, bubbly cheerleader in the popular group. Mary Cherry comes from a very rich family, and as a result tends to be spoiled and rude to those who are not popular, though she is exceedingly generous with her money. Mary Cherry has a long history of mother issues; her mother, Cherry Cherry (Delta Burke), often insults and degrades her even though she claims to love her. Mary Cherry's character is a consistent example of the series' brush with hyper-reality; she is seldom believable as an actual person, and is often referred to as "borderline retarded" by other characters, but appears as a great comic effect throughout the series. She also appears to be somewhat mentally unstable, and is often referred to as a psychopath by other characters due to her rather murderous tendencies (once during a career match-up, she got the "most likely to become a serial killer" position). She develops a crush on Harrison, whom she calls "Joe" even though she eventually reveals that she does in fact know his real name. In the final episode of the series, it is revealed that she has a long-lost twin sister, Baby Honeychild, 'but up on Gun Hill Road' better known as "B. Ho", who was raised in the Bronx. After Mama Cherry chooses B. Ho over Mary Cherry, Mary Cherry becomes an orphan.
- Jane McPherson (Lisa Darr) – Sam's mother who becomes engaged to Brooke's father.
- Mike McQueen (Scott Bryce) – Brooke's father who becomes engaged to Sam's mother.
- Roberta "Bobbi" Glass (Diane Delano) – She is the students' science teacher. Bobbi is portrayed as being mean and cruel and constantly threatens to give people F's in order to get her way. She is a woman, but has a lot of physical qualities that resemble a man. This causes the students to call her Sir. She doesn't seem bothered about it but it is later revealed in an episode entitled "Fag" that it hurts her. She also reveals that she questions her sexuality, which is focused on in the second season.

=== Supporting cast ===
- Robin John, Harrison's mother (Alley Mills)
- Poppita "Poppy" Fresh (Anel Lopez Gorham)
- Lady T (Natasha Pierce)
- April Tuna (Adria Dawn)
- Emory Dick (Hank Harris)
- Principal Cecilia Hall (Diana Bellamy)
- Vice Principal Calvin Krupps (Robert Gant)
- Wayne Vincent, drama teacher (Darryl Theirse)
- Luke Grant, journalist faculty advisor (Chad Lowe)
- "Canada", humanities teacher (Sandra Oh)
- Francis Peritti, football coach (John Caponera)
- Nurse Glass (Diane Delano)
- Leo Ferrara, Carmen's older brother (Christopher Wiehl)
- Exquisite Woo, a foreign exchange student and eventual steady girlfriend to Sugar Daddy (Michelle Krusiec)
- Adam Rothschild-Ryan (Wentworth Miller)
- George Austin (Anthony Montgomery)
- Cherry Cherry (Delta Burke)
- Jamie Roth (Nick Stabile)
- Freddy Gong (Kelvin Yu)
- Vera Krups (Marnie Crossen)
- May Tuna (Mandy Freund)
- Clarence (Mike Damus)
- Godfrey (Bob Clendenin)
- Ms. Ross (Arnetia Walker)
- Joy Ferrara (Susan Ruttan)
- Stone Cold #1 (Sam Page)
- Stone Cold #2 (Richard Voll)

== Episodes ==
Season	Episodes	Originally released	
Season	Episodes	First released	Last released
1	22	September 29, 1999	May 18, 2000
2	21	September 22, 2000	May 18, 2001

== Broadcast ==
Popular was broadcast from September 29, 1999, until May 18, 2001, for 2 seasons on The WB.

=== International release ===
The show aired in Norway, Sweden, Denmark, Poland, and Brazil with subtitles while retaining the original music and English dialogue. It also aired in New Zealand. It also premiered with dubbed versions in Mexico, Dominican Republic, Brazil - as Popularidade (Popularity), Germany, France, Italy, Cyprus and Russia. In Norway, it was renamed Livet på Kennedy High (translated to: The Life at Kennedy High).

== Home media ==
=== DVD ===
The complete series of Popular has been released on DVD in region 1 by Walt Disney Studios Home Entertainment. The DVD versions of select episodes had to change several songs that were used in the original aired episodes to stock music due to licensing fees. Television shows like Dawson's Creek, Daria, Mission Hill, Grosse Pointe and other series also went through similar situations where their DVD and streaming (ex. Netflix, Hulu) counterparts used stock music as a replacement in order to cut costs of using other artists' music.

Season	Episodes	Release date
1	22	September 21, 2004
2	21	March 8, 2005

=== Streaming ===
As of 2025, Popular is currently not available for streaming on Disney+ nor Hulu.

== Opening theme ==
The show's main opening theme was excerpted from the song "Supermodels", a track from indie singer-songwriter Kendall Payne's 1999 album Jordan's Sister. The ending theme song is "High School Highway" by Sydney Forest.

== Controversy ==
When Ryan Murphy met with an executive at The WB in 1998, the executive made homophobic remarks and notes to Murphy and about the show, Popular. Murphy recalled: "I had one meeting with an executive about a script, and I showed up at the meeting, and he started imitating my voice, and making feminine hand gestures — which I don't have — and I never thought my voice was gay until he repeated it back to me...I literally was stunned into silence and he was being really, really brutal to me." The executive also gave a note on a Popular script, where one of the characters wore a fur coat and mentioned, "You have to take it out...It's code for gay. You're being very gay here." The executive also talked about the character Mary Cherry by commenting: "Could this character be less gay?...The language coming out of this character's mouth seems very flamboyant, which we think is too gay and will offend some of our viewers, can you take that out?" Murphy continued, "They were interested in gay people who were tragic...They were interested if you were gay and you would kill yourself. Or if you would try and commit suicide. They weren't interested in gay sensibility, or the language of being gay, which is sometimes not just gay characters."

== Reception ==
=== Critical reception ===
In a review for Amazon.com, Bret Fetzer wrote,

"The key to Popular is how it merges melodramatic soap-opera stories with wrenchingly blunt and honest portrayals of the cruelties of adolescence. While some viewers may find it galling to listen to a gorgeous young actress who's been on magazine covers moan about how she can't be as perfect as a model, the series tackles everything from anorexia to peer manipulation to teen sex with directness and an eye for moral and emotional complexity. An episode about a Sadie Hawkins dance becomes a satirical farce about body image (female and male); a slumber party turns into brutal humiliation; a teacher decides to get a sex-change operation, prompting anxiety throughout the school. Almost every character gets a moment of heartfelt grandstanding, yet the actors pull them off with commitment and guts ([Sara] Rue routinely turns speeches that could have been cheesy schlock into genuine pathos). Sure, some fantasy sequences are silly, but the show skillfully creates characters and situations that defy easy definition...Popular cunningly subverts expectations; it's a smart show for both."

In 2014, Entertainment Weekly listed Popular at #21 on its list of the "26 Best Cult TV Shows Ever", calling it "the proto-Glee" and saying it "celebrated the value of outcasts and portrayed overplayed topics—Homecoming Court, sex, and secrets—through an absurdist lens."

=== Ratings ===
Season		U.S. ratings	Time slot	Network rank
1	1999–2000	2.9 million	Wednesday at 9:00 pm (Episode 1); Thursday at 8:00 pm (Episodes 2–22)	#11
2	2000–2001	1.7 million	Friday at 9:00 pm	#11

=== Awards and nominations ===
Year	Award	Result	Category	Recipient	Ref.
2000	Casting Society of America	Nominated	Best Casting for TV, Comedy Pilot	Eric Dawson, Carol Kritzer, and Robert J. Ulrich	
2000	GLAAD Media Awards	Won	Outstanding TV Individual Episode (for episode "Wild Wild Mess")		
2001	GLAAD Media Awards	Nominated	Outstanding TV Comedy Series		
2000	Genesis Awards	Won	Television – New Series (for episode "Under Siege")		
2001	Genesis Awards	Won	Television – Comedy Series (for episode "Joe Loves Mary Cherry")		
2000	SHINE Awards	Won	Comedy Episode (for episode "Booty Camp")		
2000	TV Guide Awards	Nominated	Favorite Teen Show		
2000	Teen Choice Awards	Nominated	TV – Choice Sidekick	Ron Lester	
2000	Teen Choice Awards	Nominated	TV – Choice Comedy		
2000	Teen Choice Awards	Nominated	TV – Choice Actress	Carly Pope	
2000	Teen Choice Awards	Nominated	TV – Choice Actress	Leslie Bibb	
2000	Teen Choice Awards	Won	TV – Choice Breakout Show		
2001	Teen Choice Awards	Nominated	TV – Choice Sidekick	Ron Lester	
2001	Teen Choice Awards	Nominated	TV – Choice Comedy		

== Appearances ==
In February 2000, the casts of Popular and Freaks and Geeks competed against each other in a special celebrity week of Family Feud hosted by Louie Anderson.

Leslie Bibb and Carly Pope appeared in episode 6 of fellow WB series Grosse Pointe as actresses from Popular in a volleyball game against Johnny and Courtney.

In 2012, several of the main actors reunited and raised $30,000 for AIDS Walk in Los Angeles.
