= Mike Davis (actor) =

American actor and director (1945–1986)

- Born: Winson Owen Strickland; April 12, 1945; Sacramento County, California, U.S.
- Died: January 21, 1986 (aged 40); West Hollywood, California, U.S.
- Other names: Winn Strickland; Wynn Strickland
- Education: Sacramento High School
- Occupations: Actor; model; director; set designer
- Years active: 1972–1986
- Agent: Colt Studios

Winson Owen Strickland (April 12, 1945 – January 21, 1986), known professionally as Winn Strickland and Mike Davis, was an American actor, model, art director, and set designer active in mainstream television, theater, and adult cinema during the 1970s and 1980s.

== Early life and education ==
Strickland was born in Sacramento County, California, and graduated from Sacramento High School in 1963.

== Career ==
=== Mainstream career ===
Initially working as a carpenter, he transitioned into mainstream entertainment set design, earning credits on the 1972 film Sixteen, the 1979 television programs The Osmond Family Show and Carol Burnett & Company, and Las Vegas stage revues like Folies Bergère at the Tropicana.

=== Adult film career ===
In the late 1970s, Strickland was "discovered" by Colt Studios and began performing under the pseudonym Mike Davis.

In the late 1970s, he began working in the adult film industry under the pseudonym Mike Davis. He modeled for Colt Studios and avoided most speaking roles due to a speech impediment, though he appeared in the 1982 feature Games and 1983's Coach. Behind the camera, he served as the chief art director and master carpenter for Surge Studios, designing elaborate sets for films such as Therapy, Head Trips, and his final 1985 project, Century Mining.

== Death ==
He was diagnosed with an AIDS-related illness in 1983, Strickland died on January 21, 1986, in West Hollywood, California, at the age of 40. Industry peers such as Al Parker credited Strickland's high-production design standards with defining the visual identity of early adult home video.

== Filmography ==
=== Film ===
==== Actor ====
Year	Title	Role	Notes
1977	Timberwolves Part 1	Mike	Debut
1977	Timberwolves Part 2	Mike	
1978	The Bonus	Handsome Cowboy	Colt Films
1979	Service Entry	Mike	Colt Studios
1979	Moving Violations	Mike	
1981	The Best Laid Plans	Bricklayer Worker	
1982	Nighthawk In Leather	Leather Man	
1982	Turned On!	Bartender	
1983	Games	Coach	Surge Studios
1984	The Best of Colt Films, Part 3	Mike	
1985	The Best of Colt: Part 4	Mike	
1986	Driveshaf	Mike	
1986	The Best of Colt Films	Mike	
1991	The Best of Colt Films, Part 9	Mike	Posthumous release
1992	The Best of Colt Films, Part 11	Mike	Posthumous release
1993	The Best of Colt Films, Part 13	Mike	Posthumous release
1996	The Best of Colt Films, Part 14	Mike	Posthumous release
2000	Colt Couples I: Colt Men on the Make	Mike	Posthumous release
2000	Buckshot Collection: Lovers in Summer, Workload, and the COLT Classic Timberwolves	Mike	Posthumous release

==== Director ====
Year	Title	Role	Notes
1984	Head Trips	Designer	Surge Studios
1985	Hard Disk Drive	Designer of sets	Surge Studios
1985	Century Mining	Director	Surge Studios
