= Universal Production Music =

American production music company

- Formerly: BMG Zomba Production Music (2003–2007) (rest of the world); Universal Publishing Production Music (2007–2017) (rest of the world); Killer Tracks (1989–2019) (in the United States and Canada); Kapagama (1996–2021) (in France and Germany)
- Company type: Subsidiary
- Industry: Record Company
- Founded: 1989; 37 years ago
- Headquarters: United States
- Parent: Universal Music Publishing Group
- Website: www.universalproductionmusic.com

Universal Production Music (UPM), formerly known as Killer Tracks, is a company that produces and licenses production music for use in film, television, advertising and interactive media. The company was founded in Hollywood, California, in 1989 with an original catalog of 30 CDs. Today, the UPM's catalog contains over 2,000 CDs of music from 21 global libraries including Atmosphere, Killer Tracks, Koka, Match, and Network Music. The company continues to expand its catalog by acquiring new music collections and by producing over 100 new CDs of music each year. (Universal Production Music, founded in 2003 as BMG Zomba Production Music, is a production music distributor that folded the recently acquired Zomba Production Music unit into BMG. In 2007, Universal Music Publishing acquired BMG Music Publishing and its production music library.)

In 2012, the company announced the Killer Tracks Artist Series which features original EPs of songs with lyrics from notable artists including Rev Theory and Alex Band, among others. Unlike the rest of the Killer Tracks catalog, which is intended primarily for business-to-business (B2B) licensing, the Artist Series EPs are also widely available to fans and the general public for purchase and streaming through popular digital platforms including iTunes and Spotify.

The Killer Tracks catalog also includes original production music from well-known artists, composers and producers including Chuck D, Lamont Dozier, Jim Brickman, and others.

The company is a wholly owned subsidiary of Universal Music Publishing Group. Until 2007, Killer Tracks was owned by production music division of BMG Music Publishing, which was sold alongside other operations of the company. On September 12, 2019, Killer Tracks rebranded as Universal Production Music.

Universal Production Music's US branch merged with FirstCom Music on July 12, 2021. As a result, FirstCom Music's catalogs are now available on Universal Production Music's website. In February 2022, Universal Production Music launched a new website called Usample. Through their labels, Bruton Vaults and Chappell Vaults, they have digitized two catalogs.
