= Truth Is Currency =

Studio album by Revelation Theory
- Released: September 27, 2005
- Recorded: 2004, 2005
- Genres: Hard rock; post-grunge; alternative metal
- Length: 38:12
- Label: Idol Roc Entertainment

Revelation Theory chronology
Revelation Theory EP (2004)	Truth Is Currency (2005)	Light It Up (2008)

Singles from Truth Is Currency
- 1. "Slowburn" Released: 2005; 2. "Selfish and Cold" Released: 2006

Truth Is Currency is the debut studio album by the American rock band Rev Theory, who were at the time known as Revelation Theory, released in 2005. It was their first major label album. Julien Jørgensen, one of the bands founding members and guitarist started the Truth is Currency Letters 'Melancholy Missives' in June 2019 to honour the legacy, the blogcast acts as a narrative to past Revelation Theory tunes as well as features nü music and art.

== Track listing ==
All songs written by Julien Jørgensen, except for where noted.

1. "M367 (Out of Our Hands)" (Jørgensen, Matty McCloskey) – 3:28
2. "Slowburn" – 3:22
3. "After the Rain" – 4:00
4. "Leaving It Up to You" (Brian Howes, Jørgensen) – 3:29
5. "Selfish and Cold" – 4:31
6. "Take Away" (Wes Hutchinson, Jørgensen, McCloskey) – 4:06
7. "Undone" – 3:36
8. "Loathe" – 3:44
9. "World to Burn" – 3:47
10. "Over the Line" (Jørgensen, McCloskey) – 4:09

== Singles ==
- March 11, 2006 - "Slowburn" #27 US Mainstream Rock

== Personnel ==
- Rich Luzzi – lead vocals
- Julien Jørgensen – rhythm guitar
- Matty McCloskey – bass, backing vocals
- Dave Agoglia – drums
