= Hell Yeah (Rev Theory song) =

Single by Rev Theory

from the album Light It Up
- Released: March 25, 2008
- Recorded: 2007
- Genre: Hard rock; alternative metal; post-grunge
- Length: 4:07
- Label: Interscope
- Songwriters: Rich Luzzi; Julien Jorgensen; Dave Agoglia; Matt McCloskey; Brian Howes
- Producer: Brian Howes

Rev Theory singles chronology
"Light It Up" (2008)	"Hell Yeah" (2008)	"Far from Over" (2009)

"Hell Yeah" is a song recorded by American hard rock band Rev Theory. It was released in March 2008 as the second single from their 2008 album, Light It Up. It was produced by Brian Howes and officially released March 25 on the iTunes Store. This song was also made the theme song for the TV show Blue Mountain State.

== Music video ==
The band shot the video in Palmdale and Adelanto, California with director Travis Kopach, who has done previous work for bands such as Thursday, Panic! at the Disco and Black Tide. The video also featured an appearance from the late 2005 WWE Raw Diva Search winner, and former Survivor: China contestant Ashley Massaro.

The video begins with the band inside of a diner at the Four Aces Movie Ranch when they are attracted by the arrival of Ashley who secretly steals Rich's keys to his 1965 Pontiac GTO. Rich realizes this and grabs the cook's 1967 Ford Fairlane to go after Ashley in a lengthy car chase until he successfully tracks her down at Murphy's, resulting the video to end on a cliffhanger after he goes inside. Shots of the band performing at a destroyed aircraft are also shown.

The video premiered on the Xbox Live Marketplace on May 28, 2008, a first for Xbox Live.

== Other information ==
- The song was used as theme song for the 2008 WWE PPV One Night Stand in addition to the TV show Blue Mountain State.
- In the video game Madden NFL 09, an edited version changed the title and chorus to the words "Hey Yeah", which was also reused in NHL 16 as the goal song for the Winnipeg Jets.
- The song was used as a goal song for the NHL's Buffalo Sabres, Winnipeg Jets and Edmonton Oilers.
