= Mickey Squires =

American adult film actor (born 1952)

- Born: Richard Bernsteins; December 21, 1952 (age 73); Southern California, California, U. S.
- Occupations: Actor; Model; Choreographer
- Years active: 1972 – present
- Agent(s): Colt Studio Group; Falcon Studios

Mickey Squires (born Richard Bernstein; December 21, 1952) is an American adult film actor and model who became a defining icon of the "Castro Clone" and "muscle daddy" aesthetics during the 1970s, 1980s, and early 1990s. As a primary star for the Colt Studio Group, Squires helped transition gay erotic imagery from the lean, mustachioed look of the post-Stonewall era into the hyper-masculine, bodybuilder-influenced aesthetic of the 1980s.

== Early life ==
He was born in Southern California, Bernstein was the youngest of three brothers and was raised by a single mother in North Long Beach. In contrast to his athletic siblings, he was drawn to the performing arts from an early age, frequently choreographing ballets and conducting imaginary orchestras as a child.

In the early 1970s, Bernstein began his professional career in film distribution with 20th Century Fox. He eventually relocated to San Francisco to work as a sales manager, arriving just as the city's gay sexual revolution was gaining momentum.

== Career ==
=== Adult Media and the "Colt Man" Aesthetic ===
Bernstein began modeling under the pseudonym Mickey Squires after a friend encouraged him to pose nude. His career commenced with physique photography for clubs like The Probe, before he was recruited by Jim French, the founder of Colt Studio Group.

Founded in 1967, Colt Studio Group revolutionized gay male visibility by establishing a "hyper-masculine" ideal. In the 1980s, the studio moved away from the "pretty boy" imagery of earlier decades toward a rugged, muscular, and "butch" aesthetic, frequently utilizing uniforms and outdoor settings to communicate power and assertion.

Colt Studios heavily utilized Squires to project this rugged, blue-collar masculinity. During the 1980s, he became a central figure in the cultural shift from the lean "Castro Clone" look to the "beefy muscle daddy" archetype. Squires appeared on approximately 20 adult magazine covers, including prominent publications such as Mandate and Zipper.

=== Film ===
Squires became a major star for Colt Films, Zeus, and J. Brian. He was noted by directors for his ability to maintain a rugged, "all-man" persona on screen. His notable works include Flashbacks (1980), Red Ball Express (1981), and the experimental, military-themed film The Brig (1982), directed by Norman Yonemoto, in which he performed under the name Jason Sato.

Bernstein has cited The Come On, co-starring Jack Packer, as his personal favorite performance due to the genuine chemistry shared with his scene partner. While most careers in the adult film industry are brief, Squires maintained longevity, appearing sporadically in videos as late as Butch Bear (2001).

=== Later life ===
Mickey retired from adult performance in the early 2000s, Bernstein transitioned into a career in the hotel industry. A lover of theater and high culture, he frequently surprised fans and clients with his intellectual and gentle demeanor, which stood in stark contrast to the aggressive, silent characters he portrayed on screen.

== Personal life ==
Bernstein is a long-term survivor of HIV, having received his diagnosis in 1996. He currently resides in Palm Springs, California, where he remains an active member of the LGBTQ+ community.

== Filmography ==
=== Film ===
Year	Title	Role/Studio	Notes
1980	Flashbacks	J. Brian	Iconic scene filmed in Muir Woods.
1981	Face To Face	Mickey	
1981	Red Ball Express	Wolf	PM Productions
1981	San Francisco	Mickey	Part of the "Clone" era series.
1981	The Come On	Mickey	With Jack Packer; Bernstein's personal favorite scene.
1982	The Brig	Jason Sato	Directed by Norman Yonemoto.
1983	Best Of Colt Films 2	Mickey	Compilation; featured in "Sun Strokes."
1983	Blue Hanky Left	Bodybuilder	PM Productions
1983	Orange Hanky Left	Musculer Bodybuilder	PM Productions
1984	Fade Out	Handsome Guy	HIS Video
1985	Joys of Self Abuse	Mickey	Wings Video
1985	Safe Sex	Mickey	Released during the onset of the HIV/AIDS crisis.
1986	Best Of Colt Films 3	Mickey	Colt Studios
1987	Best Stallions	Mickey	Bad Boys Video
1988	Stroke 26: Anywhere, Anytime	Mickey	Vidco Entertainment
1991	Best Of Colt Films 10	Mickey	Colt Studios
1992	Best Of Colt Films 12	Mickey	Colt Studios featured in "The Come On" segment.
1993	Muscle Club	Mickey Squires	Transition to "Muscle Daddy" aesthetic.
1995	Wettest	Chris	Live Video Inc
1996	Bear Classic	Steve	Entry into the "Bear" subculture genre.
1997	Big Bearded And Bulging	Steve	HIS Video
2001	Bear Country	Bob	Catalina Video
2001	Fire And Smoke	Vance	BIC Productions
2001	Leather Sex Underground	Ricky	Manhunter
2001	Butch Bear	Rex	Final major feature of the era.
2002	Boner's Manual	William	BIC Productions.
2003	Bodybuilders' Jam 5	Mickey	Jimmy Z Productions physique documentary.
2005	Bodybuilders' Jam 9	Micky	Jimmy Z Productions
2006	Bodybuilders' Jam 7	Mickey	Jimmy Z Productions
2006	Tool Chest: An Erotic Collection	Butch Bear	Anthology release.
2007	Bodybuilders' Jam 25	Bodybuilder	Jimmy Z Productions
2007	My Dick On Fire	Mickey	Uniform X
2022	Raw! Uncut! Video!	Mickey	Documentary subject.
2026	Mickey & Richard	Mickey	Documentary directed by Ryan A. White and Alex Clausen.

== Legacy ==
Bernstein returned to the public eye as the subject of the feature-length documentary Mickey & Richard. Directed by Ryan A. White and A.P. Pickle, the film premiered at the International Film Festival Rotterdam and explores the deep dichotomy between Bernstein's shy, private personality and his towering, iconic screen persona as Mickey Squires.
