= Light It Up (Rev Theory song) =

Single by Rev Theory

from the album Light It Up
- Released: March 25, 2008
- Recorded: 2007
- Genre: Hard rock; alternative metal; heavy metal
- Length: 4:12
- Label: Interscope
- Songwriters: Rich Luzzi; Julien Jorgensen; Dave Agoglia; Matt McCloskey; Rikki Lixx
- Producer: Josh Abraham

Rev Theory singles chronology
"Slowburn" (2005)	"Light It Up" (2008)	"Hell Yeah" (2008)

"Light It Up" is a 2008 promotional single and the first single by the hard rock band Rev Theory from their second album of the same name. It was officially released for digital download on March 25 and for radio airplay in the fall of 2008. Since August 2008, the song has peaked at number 25 on Billboard's Hot Mainstream Rock Tracks and number 74 on the Billboard 200.

The song was featured as one of the two theme songs for the 2008 WWE pay-per-view event WrestleMania XXIV. The song is also featured in EA Sports' NASCAR 09. On December 23, 2008, it became available as downloadable content for the game Guitar Hero World Tour. On February 5, 2009, the song was featured as downloadable content in the iPhone OS game Tap Tap Revenge.

== Track listing ==
1. "Light It Up" – 4:12
