= Chris Romano =

American actor (born 1978)

- Born: February 2, 1978 (age 48); Boston, Massachusetts, U.S.
- Other name: Romanski
- Occupations: Actor; writer; producer; director
- Years active: 2000–present

Chris Romano also known as Romanski (born February 2, 1978) is an American actor, writer, producer, and director, most commonly known for co-creating, producing and starring in Spike TV's Blue Mountain State.

== Early life ==
Romano grew up in Nashua, New Hampshire, and graduated from Nashua High School South. He then went on to Plymouth State College for 1 year before transferring and graduating from Emerson College in 2000.

Chris claims that he and his family were Lebanese-American (not Italian-American) and in the Witness Protection Program. According to Chris, his father, Nicholas John Romano (Shaheen), a.k.a. "Johnny Cool", was the most prolific arsonist in the history of Massachusetts in the '60s and '70s, and had struck a deal with authorities to turn State's Evidence in return for protection. This is corroborated by the court case COMMONWEALTH vs. NICHOLAS K. SHAHEEN, which occurred in Massachusetts between May of 1982 and February of 1983, and led to an agreement between the state of Massachusetts and "a witness." It is stated in the court documents that the witness exchanged testimony regarding previous activities as an arsonist for protective custody.

== Television career ==
=== Blue Mountain State ===
Romano co-created the show, and also plays the role of Sammy Cacciatore, the school's mascot (and Alex's roommate), who is constantly searching for girls and excuses to get drunk, with his drinking often leading him into misadventure. Romano also produced, starred in, and co-wrote the film adaptation.

=== Other ===
Romano had a recurring role in the hit CBS television show How I Met Your Mother as Adam "Punchy" Punciarello, Ted's (Josh Radnor) high school friend; he also co-executive produced 24 episodes of the show. He has appeared on The Sarah Silverman Program, Drunk History, Big Time in Hollywood, FL, and Acceptable TV. He had a brief non-speaking role in the mockumentary 7 Days in Hell where he played a streaker who has sex with tennis player Aaron Williams (Andy Samberg) on the court. He also appeared in Tour de Pharmacy as steroid-addled cyclist Jabin Dolchey.
