= Light It Up (Rev Theory album) =

Studio album by Rev Theory
- Released: June 10, 2008
- Recorded: 2007
- Genres: Hard rock; post-grunge; alternative metal
- Length: 39:34
- Label: Interscope
- Producers: Brian Howes; Josh Abraham

Rev Theory chronology
Truth Is Currency (2005)	Light It Up (2008)	Acoustic Live from the Gibson Lounge (2009)

Singles from Light It Up
- 1. "Hell Yeah" / "Light It Up" Released: March 25, 2008

Light It Up is the second studio album by the American rock band Rev Theory. It is their first under the Interscope Records label, and was released on June 10, 2008, to sales of 10,200 copies. It reached number 74 on the Billboard 200 on June 28, 2008 and had sold 132,000 copies by 2012.

== Track listing ==
All tracks written by Rev Theory.

1. "Hell Yeah" – 4:07
2. "Favorite Disease" – 3:41
3. "Light It Up" – 4:13
4. "Broken Bones" – 4:26
5. "Kill the Headlights" – 3:15
6. "Wanted Man" – 3:41
7. "Ten Years" – 3:43
8. "Falling Down" – 4:05
9. "You're the One" – 4:20
10. "Far from Over" – 3:59

Walmart edition bonus track (digital download)

1. "Light It Up" (acoustic) – 4:13

iTunes edition bonus track

1. "Slow Burn" (acoustic) – 3:50

== Reception ==
Professional ratings
Review scores
Source	Rating
AllMusic	3/5 stars
TuneLab Music	9/10 stars

Light It Up received relatively positive reviews. Critics have agreed that the album contains many catchy riffs and solid rock n' roll harmonies. The album has sold about 100,000 copies as of 2009.

== Charts ==
Chart performance for Light It Up
Chart (2008–2009)	Peak position
Canadian Albums (Nielsen SoundScan)	47
US Billboard 200	74
US Top Alternative Albums (Billboard)	14
US Top Hard Rock Albums (Billboard)	6
US Top Rock Albums (Billboard)	22
