= Allison Burnett =

Screenwriter, director, producer, novelist

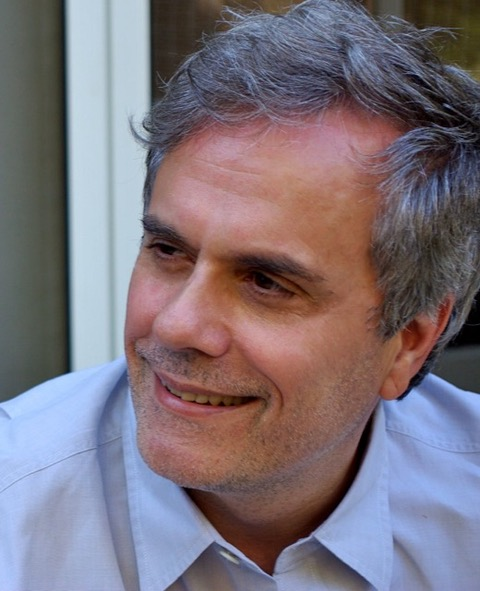
- Born: Ithaca, New York, U.S.
- Education: Northwestern University (BA)
- Occupations: Screenwriter; film director; novelist
- Spouse: Chloe King (divorced)
- Children: 2
- Website: www.allisonburnett.com

Allison Burnett (born December 16, 1958) is an American screenwriter, film director, and novelist.

== Early life and education ==
Allison Burnett was born in Ithaca, New York. He graduated from Northwestern University in 1979. He then had a resident fellowship at the Juilliard School for playwriting in 1981.

== Film ==
=== 1990s ===
Burnett's first screenplay to be produced was the kick-boxing prison drama, Bloodfist III: Forced to Fight (1992), which he co-wrote with Charles Mattera. He also wrote Gregory Hines' directorial debut, Bleeding Hearts (1994), and the film Red Meat (1997), which he directed, starring John Slattery, Jennifer Grey, and Lara Flynn Boyle.

=== 2000s ===
Burnett's next film was Autumn in New York (2000), starring Richard Gere and Winona Ryder. This was followed by the Lifetime Original Movie Perfect Romance (2004), Feast of Love (2007) based on the book by Charles Baxter and starring Morgan Freeman and Greg Kinnear, and Resurrecting the Champ (2007), written with Michael Bortman and starring Samuel L. Jackson and Josh Hartnett. In 2008, Burnett wrote, with Robert Fyvolent and Mark Brinker, the crime thriller Untraceable (2008) starring Diane Lane. The following year, Burnett wrote the remake of Fame.

=== 2010s ===
Burnett had two films released in 2012. The first was Underworld Awakening (2012), co-written with Len Wiseman, John Hlavin, and J. Michael Straczynski, the fourth film in the Underworld series starring Kate Beckinsale. The following month, Gone (2012) was released, starring Amanda Seyfried.

In 2013, Burnett directed his second film, Ask Me Anything (2013) based on his novel Undiscovered Gyrl. The film stars Britt Robertson, Justin Long, Christian Slater, Robert Patrick, and Martin Sheen.

In 2019, Burnett directed the sequel to Ask Me Anything, Another Girl, starring Sammi Hanratty and Peter Gadiot, based on his 2015 novella of the same name.

=== 2020s ===
In 2023, Burnett wrote the biopic of Jeff Bezos, Bezos: The Beginning, co-written with Tashena Ebanks and R.V. Romero, and directed by Khoa Lee. The film stars Armando Gutierrez and Kevin Sorbo.

In 2025, Netflix released My Oxford Year, inspired by the novel of the same name by Julia Whelan, which was in turn based on Burnett's original screenplay. My Oxford Year was written by Allison Burnett and Melissa Osborne, and directed by Iain Morris. The film stars Sofia Carson, Corey Mylchreest, and Dougray Scott.

== Fiction ==
Burnett's first novel, Christopher: A Tale of Seduction was published in 2003 by Broadway Books. It was a finalist for the 2004 Pen Center Literary Award.

In 2006, Burnett wrote a sequel to Christopher titled The House Beautiful, published by Carroll & Graf, followed in 2009 by the novel Undiscovered Gyrl, published by Vintage Books.

In 2011, Burnett wrote the second sequel to his novel Christopher, titled Death By Sunshine, published by Writers Tribe Books.

Burnett released his fifth novel, The Escape of Malcolm Poe, in 2014. He released a sequel novella to Undiscovered Gyrl, titled Another Girl, in 2015.

In 2020 Allison released his sixth novel, The Ghosts of Normal, followed by his seventh novel, the second sequel to Undiscovered Gyrl, The Last Girl Podcast in 2023.

== Filmography ==
Year	Title	Notes
1992	Bloodfist III: Forced to Fight	With Charles Mattera
1994	Bleeding Hearts	Directorial debut of Gregory Hines
1997	Red Meat	Also director
2000	Autumn in New York	
2004	Perfect Romance	TV movie
2007	Feast of Love	Based on the novel by Charles Baxter
2007	Resurrecting the Champ	With Michael Bortman; Based on the LA Times article by J.R. Moehringer
2008	Untraceable	With Robert Fyvolent and Mark Brinker
2009	Fame	Remake of Fame (1980)
2012	Underworld Awakening	With Len Wiseman, John Hlavin, and J. Michael Straczynski; Fourth installment in Underworld series
2012	Gone	
2012	Step One	Short film
2014	Ask Me Anything	Also director, based on his novel Undiscovered Gyrl
2019	Off the Record	With Claude Hurwicz and James Quill
2021	Another Girl	Also director, based on his novella of the same name, sequel to Ask Me Anything
2023	Bezos	With Tashena Ebanks and R.V. Romero
2025	My Oxford Year	With Melissa Osborne

== Novels ==
Year	Title	Publisher	Notes
2003	Christopher: A Tale of Seduction	Broadway Books	Finalist in Fiction, 2004 Pen Center USA Award
2006	The House Beautiful	Carroll & Graf	Sequel to Christopher: A Tale of Seduction
2009	Undiscovered Gyrl	Vintage Books	Adapted into film, directed by the author
2011	Death by Sunshine	Writers Tribe Books	Second sequel to Christopher: A Tale of Seduction
2014	The Escape of Malcolm Poe	Writers Tribe Books	
2015	Another Girl	Allison Burnett	Sequel novella to Undiscovered Gyrl
2020	The Ghosts of Normal	Allison Burnett	
2023	The Last Girl Podcast	Allison Burnett	Second sequel to Undiscovered Gyrl
