= Gone (2012 film) =

- Theatrical release poster
- Directed by: Heitor Dhalia
- Written by: Allison Burnett
- Produced by: Sidney Kimmel; Tom Rosenberg; Gary Lucchesi; Dan Abrams; Chris Salvaterra
- Starring: Amanda Seyfried; Daniel Sunjata; Jennifer Carpenter; Sebastian Stan; Wes Bentley
- Cinematography: Michael Grady
- Edited by: John Axelrad
- Music by: David Buckley
- Production companies: Lakeshore Entertainment; Sidney Kimmel Entertainment
- Distributed by: Summit Entertainment
- Release date: February 24, 2012
- Running time: 95 minutes
- Country: United States
- Language: English
- Box office: $18.1 million

Gone is a 2012 American thriller film written by Allison Burnett, directed by Heitor Dhalia, and starring Amanda Seyfried. The film earned negative reviews from critics and was a box office disappointment.

== Plot ==
One year prior, in Portland, Oregon, Jillian "Jill" Conway was kidnapped by a brutal serial killer who held her captive in a mass grave of his victims. Police refuse to believe her due to Jill previously being institutionalized. In the present, Jill lives with her sister Molly and works at Lucky Star Diner. At work, Jill and her coworker Sharon receive a generous tip from a regular customer. After returning home, Jill discovers that Molly is missing. She reports it to the police, who still refuse to believe her, except for Detective Hood, a new addition to the homicide department.

Jill discovers that a locksmith company van was parked in front of her house overnight and learns that the owner's son, Nick, rented it to a stranger named Digger. She follows a receipt in the van to a hardware store, where she discovers Digger's vehicle and address, which leads her to the Royal Hotel. Upon learning that Digger's real name is Jim LaPointe, she finds duct tape, pet food, and matches from Lucky Star in his vacated room. Jill goes to Sharon's house and obtains LaPointe's phone number. She calls him, and he offers to meet her. While driving, Molly's boyfriend, Billy, calls her and says that Molly was located, which was a ruse by the police to stop Jill's search.

LaPointe leads Jill to a remote spot in Forest Park and tells her that he is not holding Molly. Jill arrives at the spot and takes pictures of LaPointe's previous victims. Meanwhile, Molly breaks out of her restraints and emerges from under Jill's house. She tells Billy that she was assaulted and dragged under the house. Molly reports the attack to Sergeant Powers and Detective Lonsdale, confirming Jill's story. Jill finds the hole where she was originally held captive. LaPointe attacks her, but Jill shoots him. LaPointe confesses to Jill that he kept Molly underneath the house, hoping to lure Jill to the grave and kill her. Jill then pours kerosene into the hole while LaPointe begs for his life and lights him on fire.

Sergeant Powers texts Jill that Molly is safe. Jill returns home and assures Molly that LaPointe is dead. When asked by the police about the man she met, Jill replies that it was all in her head. Sometime later, Lieutenant Bozeman receives an anonymous package containing the pictures of LaPointe's victims alongside a map leading to the grave.

== Cast ==
- Amanda Seyfried as Jillian "Jill" Conway
- Emily Wickersham as Molly Conway
- Wes Bentley as Detective Peter Hood
- Sebastian Stan as Billy
- Daniel Sunjata as Sergeant Powers
- Jennifer Carpenter as Sharon Ames
- Nick Searcy as M. Miller
- Socratis Otto as Jim "Digger" LaPointe
- Joel David Moore as Nick Massey
- Katherine Moennig as Detective Erica Lonsdale
- Michael Paré as Lieutenant Ray Bozeman
- Ted Rooney as Henry Massey
- Amy Lawhorn as Tanya Muslin
- Susan Hess as Dr. Mira Anders
- Jeanine Jackson as Mrs. Cermak
- Hunter Parrish as Trey
- Jordan Fry as Jock

== Production ==
In February 2011, it was announced that Amanda Seyfried had been selected to topline the thriller Gone, directed by Heitor Dhalia, from a script penned by Allison Burnett.

== Reception ==
=== Critical reception ===
Gone currently holds a 12% rating on Rotten Tomatoes based on 69 reviews from critics, with an average score of 3.49/10. On Metacritic, which uses an average of critics' reviews, Gone has a 36/100 rating, indicating "generally unfavorable" reviews. Audiences polled by CinemaScore gave the film an average grade of "C+" on an A+ to F scale.

Writing in DVDTalk, critic Adam Tyner described the film as "just another room temperature thriller lacking much in the way of, y'know, thrills. It's just ticking off check boxes," and noted that "the direction is as aggressively anonymous as the writing." A review in Variety described the film as "a low-pulse thriller that evaporates from memory with the last credit." Critic R. Kurt Oselund wrote in Slant that "the script by Allison Burnett [...] is a layer cake of easy plot propellers, iced with rib-tickling garbage like a wooded crime scene," and that "Seyfried does indeed look a touch silly running from point to belabored point with her goldilocks a-flowing [but she is] as unerring as anyone could hope for from someone tasked to spit out lines like, 'I’ll sleep when he’s dead!'"

=== Box office ===
Gone grossed a domestic amount of $11,682,205 and $6,417,984 internationally for a worldwide total of $18,100,189.
