= Broadway Bridge (Portland, Oregon) =

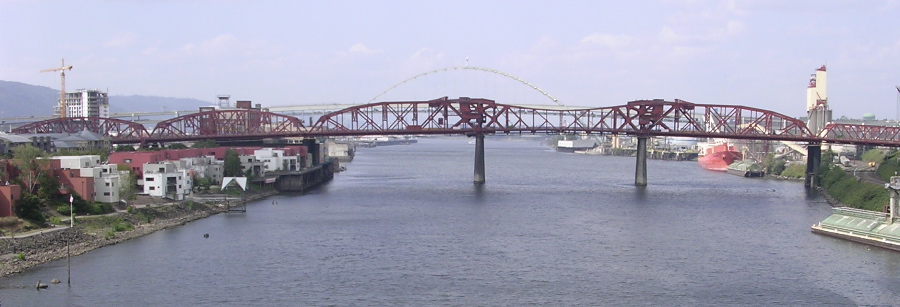
- Coordinates: 45°31′55″N 122°40′26″W
- Carries: Vehicles, Portland Streetcar and pedestrians
- Crosses: Willamette River
- Locale: Portland, Oregon
- Maintained by: Multnomah County
- ID number: 06757

Characteristics
- Design: Truss with double-leaf Rall-type bascule lift span
- Total length: 1,742 ft (531 m)
- Width: 70 ft (21 m)
- Longest span: Fixed: 297 ft (91 m); Double-leaf bascule: 278 ft (85 m)
- Clearance above: 13 ft (4.0 m)
- Clearance below: 90 ft (27 m) at center (when bascule span is closed)

History
- Designer: Ralph Modjeski
- Opened: April 22, 1913
- Broadway Bridge
- U.S. National Register of Historic Places
- Location: Portland, Oregon; Willamette River at river mile 11.7
- Coordinates: 45°31′55″N 122°40′26″W
- MPS: Willamette River Highway Bridges of Portland, Oregon
- NRHP reference No.: 12000930
- Added to NRHP: November 14, 2012

The Broadway Bridge is a Rall-type bascule bridge spanning the Willamette River in Portland, Oregon, United States, built in 1913. It was Portland's first bascule bridge, and it continues to hold the distinction of being the longest span of its bascule design type in the world. It was added to the National Register of Historic Places in November 2012.

== History and description ==
The bridge was anticipated to be the world's longest bascule bridge and there was competition between the Strauss, Scherzer, and Rall bascule design patent holders. The "Rall" was selected based on cost.

Ralph Modjeski designed the structure, which opened on April 22, 1913, at a cost of $1.6 million. It was the world's longest double-leaf bascule bridge, of any bascule type, at the time. The bridge's name derives from the street it carries, Broadway, but at the time of the bridge's construction that street name was in use only east of the river. The westside portion of what is now Broadway had been named 7th Avenue, but was renamed Broadway when the bridge opened and connected the two streets.

The bridge has four vehicle lanes (two lanes in each direction) that in 2006 carried about 30,000 vehicles per day. It is also a major bicycle route over the river with more than 2,000 crossings daily in 2005, and has a pair of 11-foot (3.4 m) wide sidewalks. On average, the bridge's draw span is opened about 25 times a month.

In 1927–28, a 2,000-foot (610 m)-long viaduct was built from the bridge's west deck, extending due west above Lovejoy Street to 14th Avenue, providing access to and from the bridge that had previously been blocked by railroad yards. This viaduct was known as the Lovejoy Ramp. A shorter ramp rising from Northwest 10th Avenue at Irving Street and connecting to the easternmost portion of the new Lovejoy viaduct was built in 1927, but not opened, due to delays to the start of work on the Lovejoy viaduct's western section (west of 10th), and did not open until October 1928. Construction of the long viaduct section from 10th to 14th began in mid-1928, and the viaduct opened in December 1928.

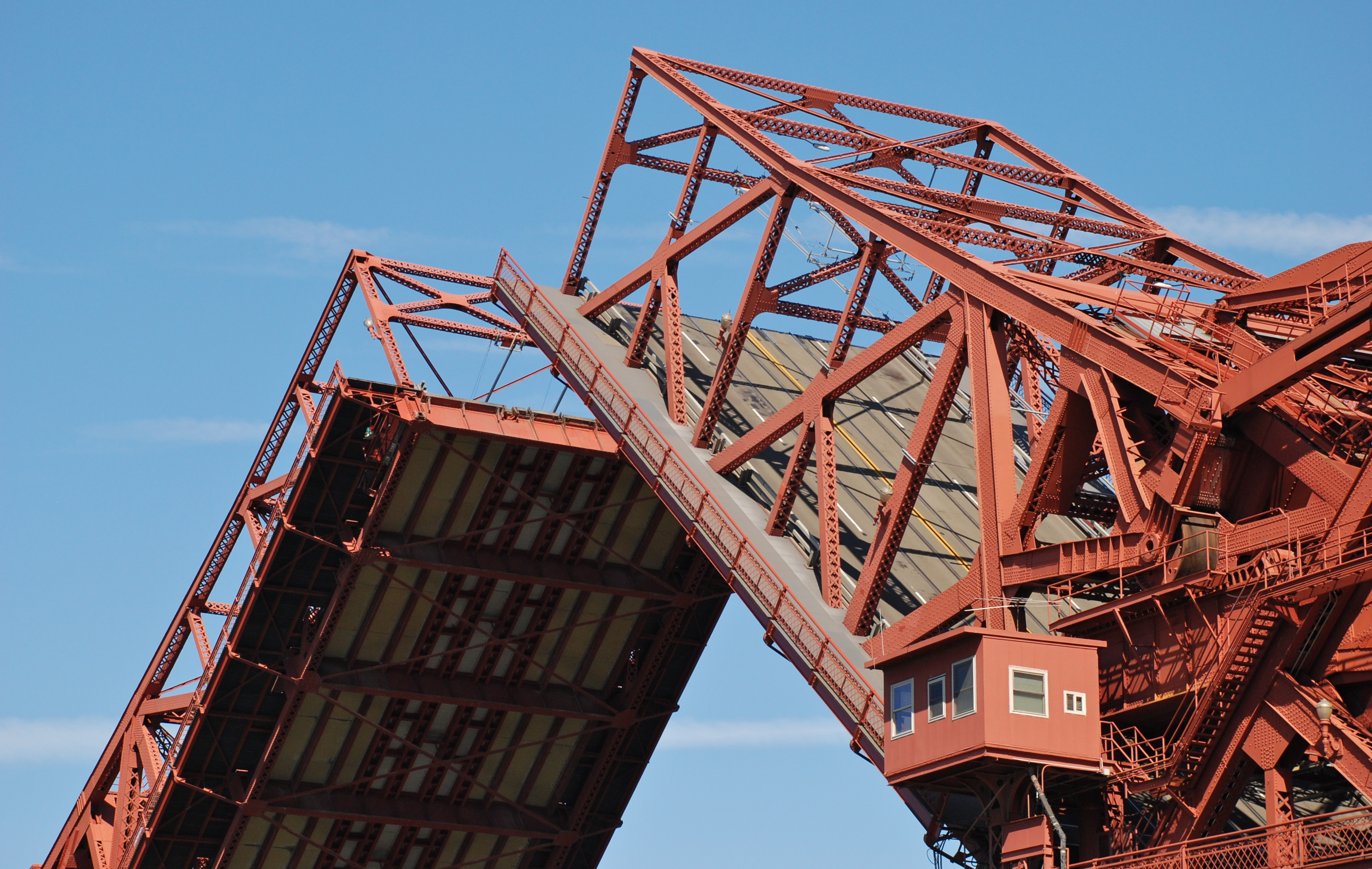
The bridge's bascule span open

The bridge was originally black, in common with the nearby Steel and Hawthorne spans, but Portland architect Lewis Crutcher suggested in 1961 that each have its own distinct color. The Broadway Bridge was repainted "Golden Gate" red (also known as international orange) in 1963.

The bridge was added to the National Register of Historic Places in November 2012.

=== Public transit use ===
Streetcars originally crossed the bridge from its opening in 1913 until 1940, but by at least 1944, the abandoned tracks had been removed or paved over. Work to reinstall tracks began in 2010, and streetcar service across the bridge resumed in 2012. The Broadway Bridge was also used by trolley buses, from 1937 to 1958. In addition to the Portland Streetcar's A Loop and B Loop lines, one TriMet bus route currently uses the bridge, route 17-Broadway.

=== Modifications and repairs ===
Because it is such a complicated bridge there have been frequent repairs to its structure and mechanicals. In 1948, the concrete deck was replaced with steel grating. During 1982, bicycle access was improved through an $18,000 signal and sidewalk upgrade. In order to improve access and reduce energy costs, the sidewalks and lighting were replaced in 2000–2001. The Lovejoy Ramp, the long viaduct to and from 14th Avenue, was removed in 1999 as part of a $12.4 million reconstruction, intended to open up the site of the by-then-abandoned railroad yards for redevelopment. It was rebuilt as a much shorter Lovejoy ramp, from 9th Avenue, which opened in May 2002. A $28 million renovation began in February 2003. Included in this was the replacement of steel grating with a fiber-reinforced polymer composite material called DuraSpan, made by Martin Marietta Materials. The renovation was completed in February 2005.

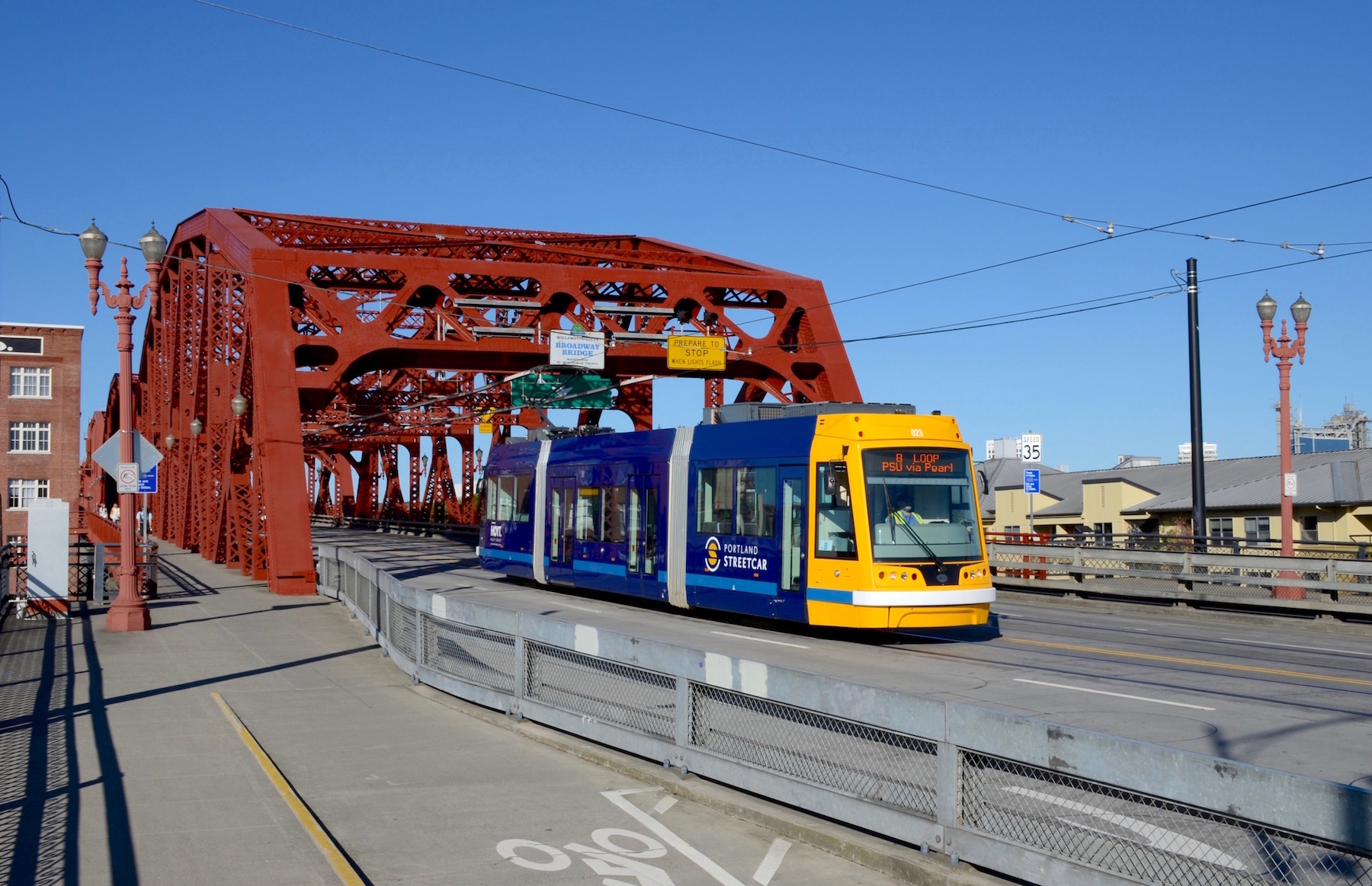
A streetcar at the west end of the bridge in 2016

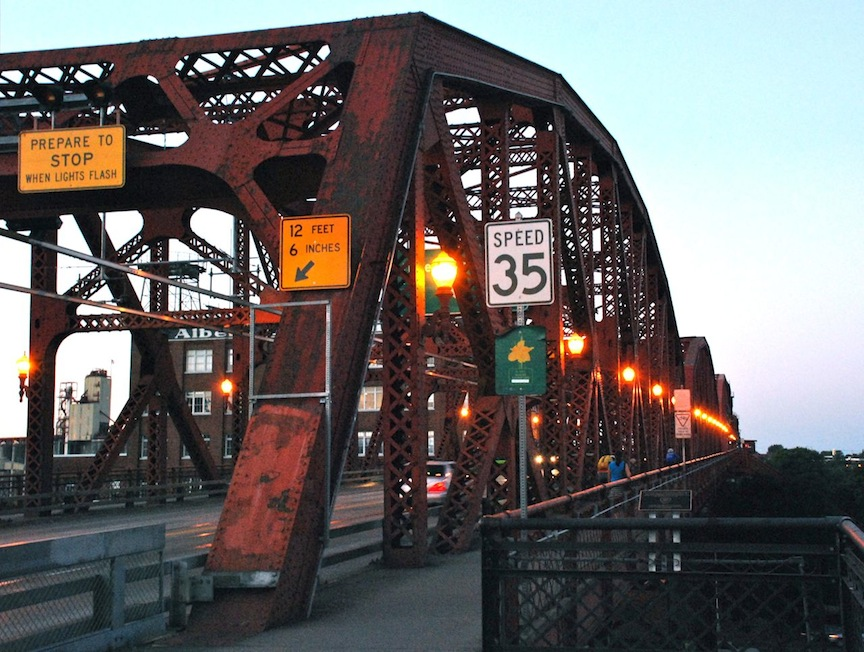
Lights along the bridge

In July 2010, the bridge was closed to all traffic for two months in order to begin re-installing streetcar infrastructure, for an expansion of the Portland Streetcar system. Progress was sufficient to reopen two of four lanes of the bridge on September 4. Streetcar-related construction continued through 2011, including installation of the overhead power equipment. The new streetcar line opened in September 2012 and was known as the CL Line (Central Loop); in 2015, its name was changed to A Loop (clockwise) and B Loop (counterclockwise).

== In popular culture ==
The Broadway Bridge is prominently featured in the climax of the film Untraceable (2008). In the film, FBI agent Jennifer Marsh (Diane Lane) becomes stranded on the east end of the bridge after an online serial killer hacks into her car's computer. The scene was filmed both on location as well as on a studio sound stage. The bridge is also a setting for the 1996 film Foxfire, its most notable appearance being in the final scene when Legs Sadovsky (Angelina Jolie) and Maddy Wirtz (Hedy Burress) decide to part ways.

== Gallery ==
=== Historic American Engineering Record drawings ===
Detailed drawings and description from the Historic American Engineering Record (HAER), a U.S. National Park Service program.

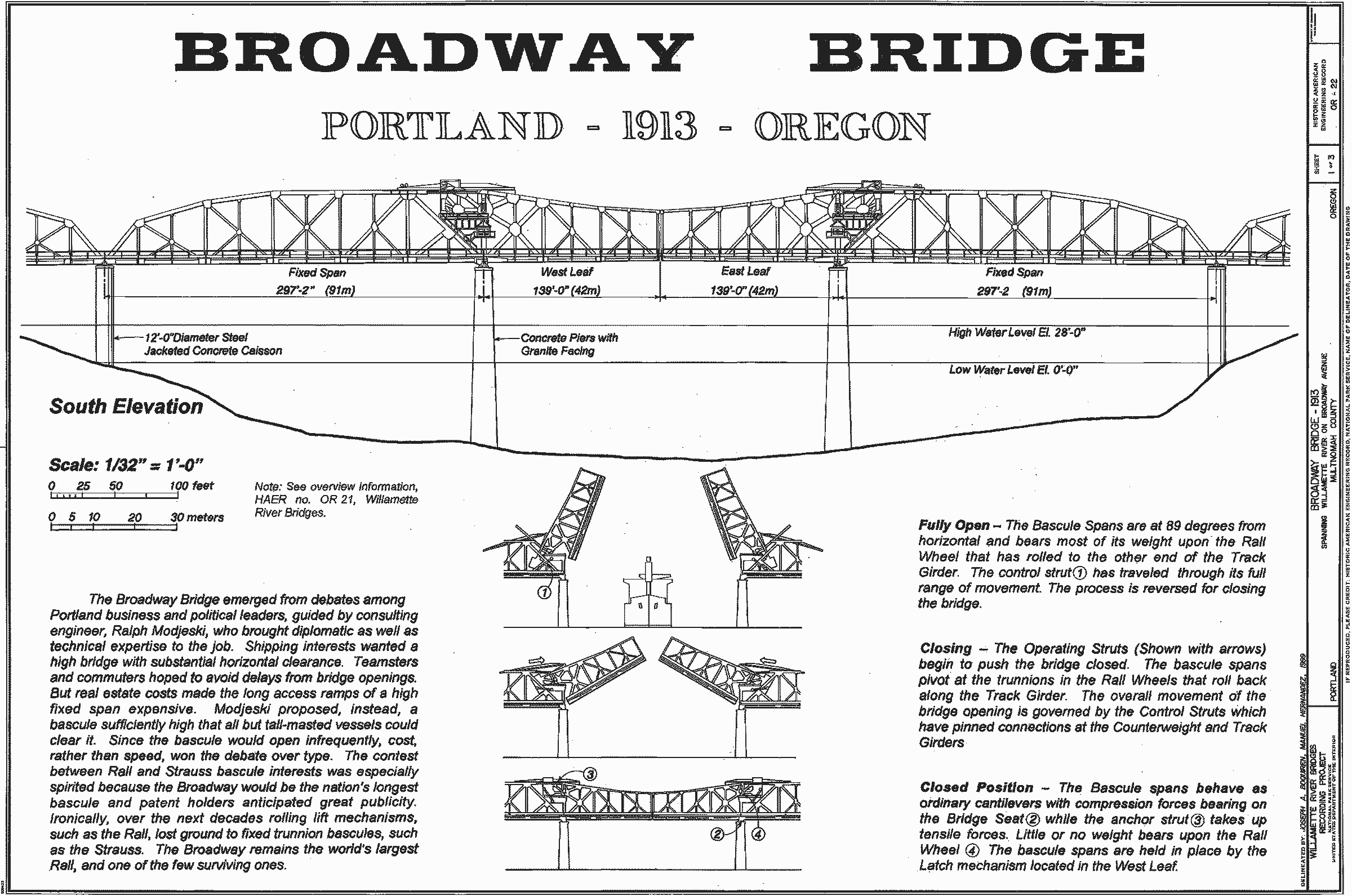
HAER description

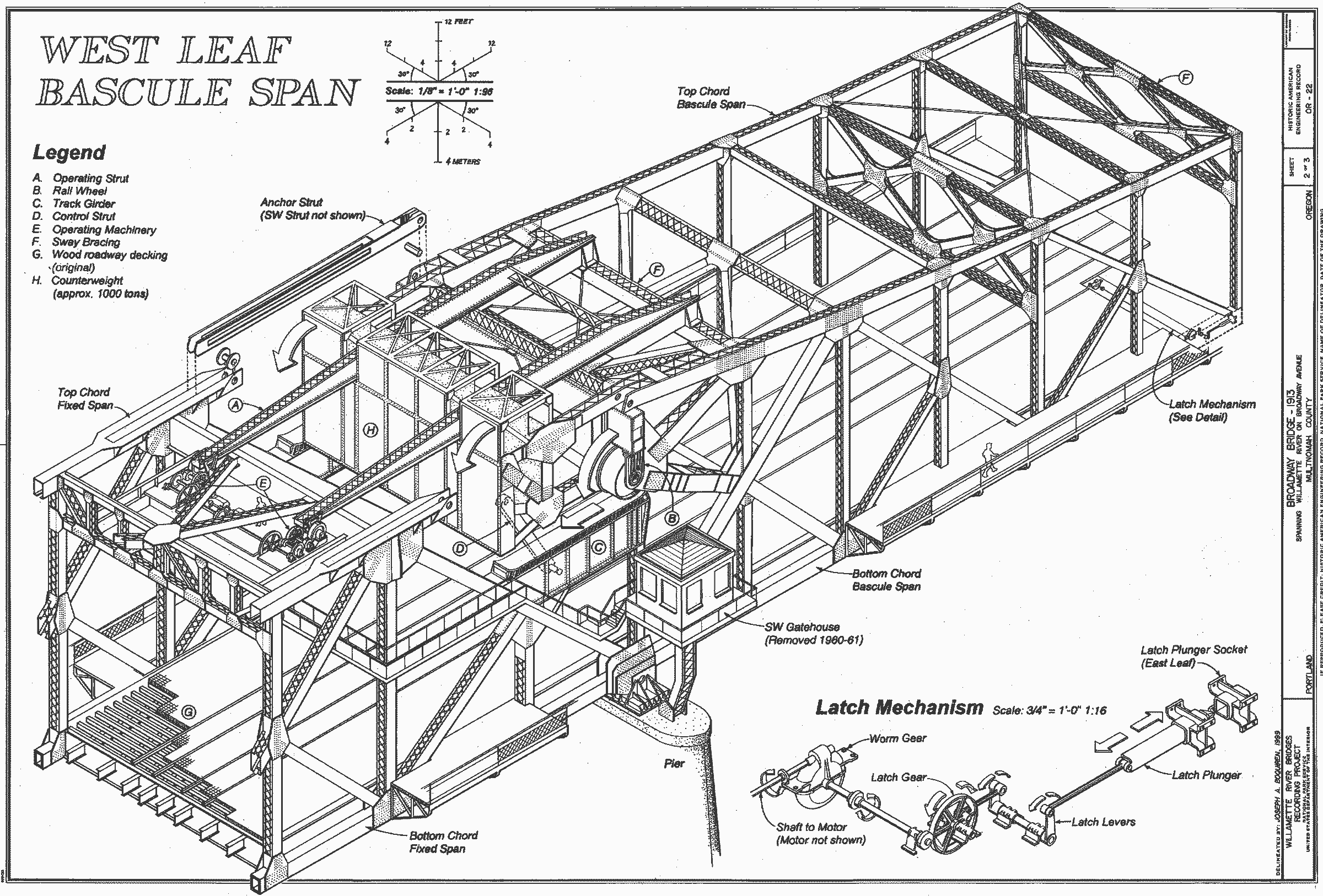
West leaf bascule span

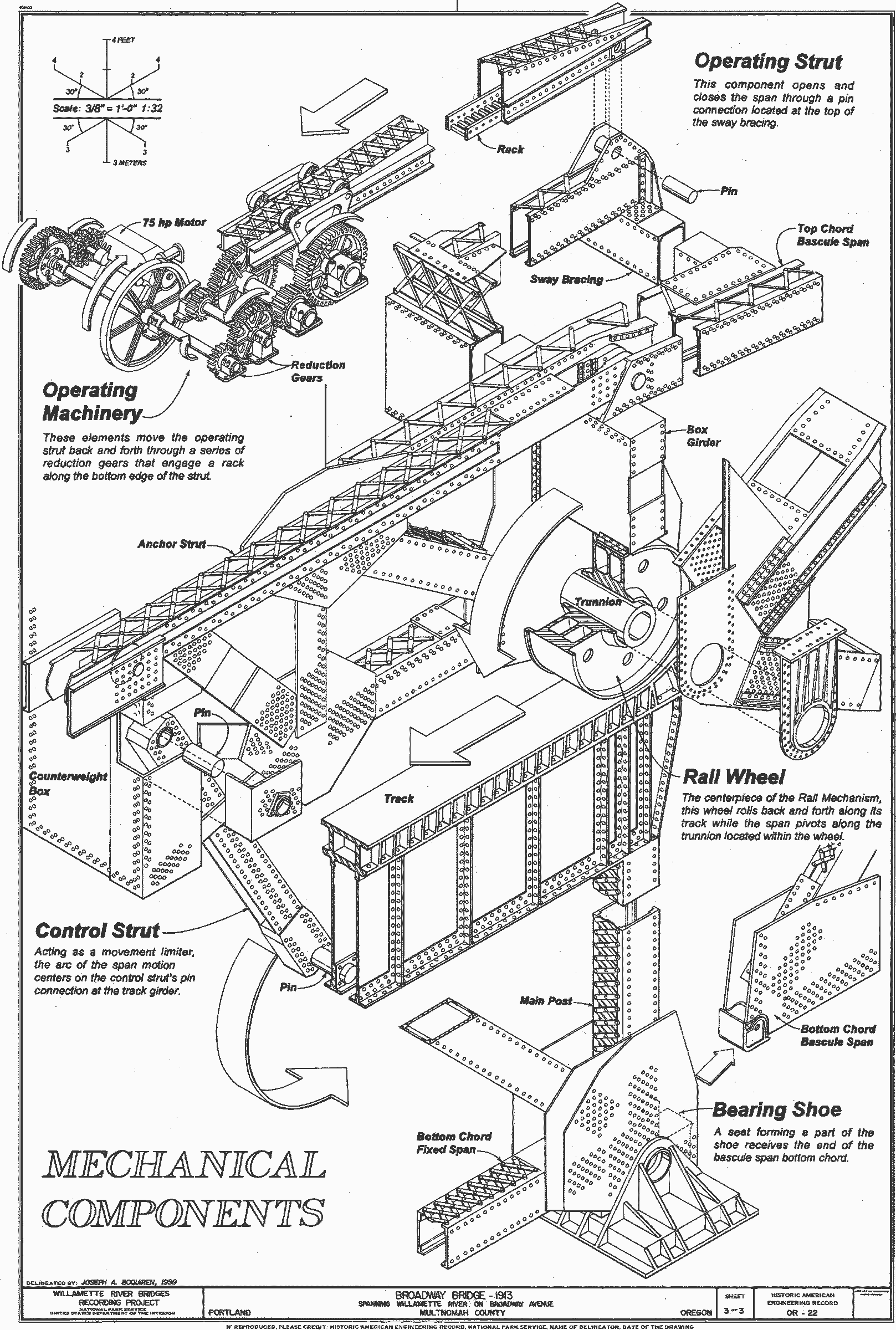
Bridge mechanics

=== Photographs ===
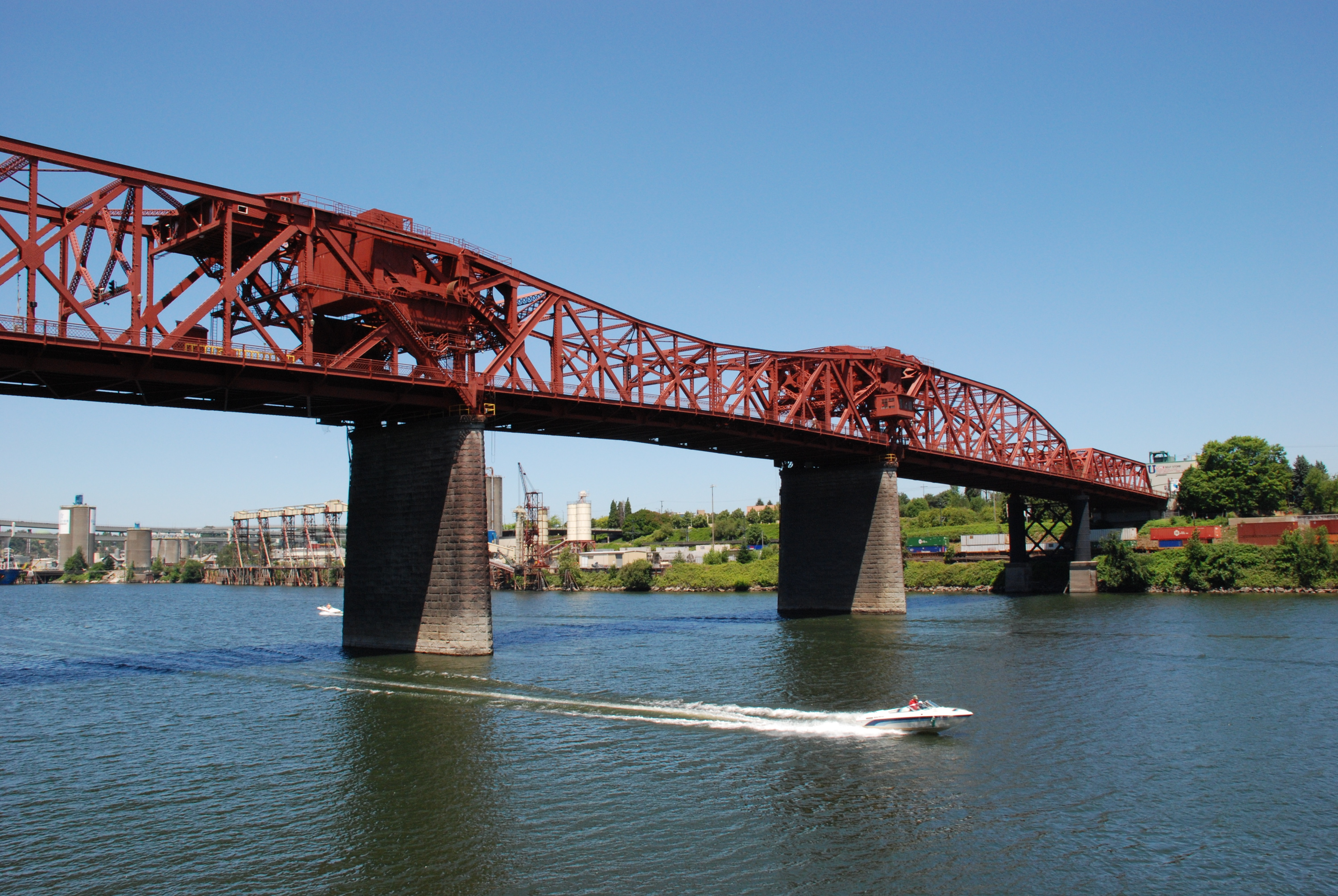
Close-up view from river bank

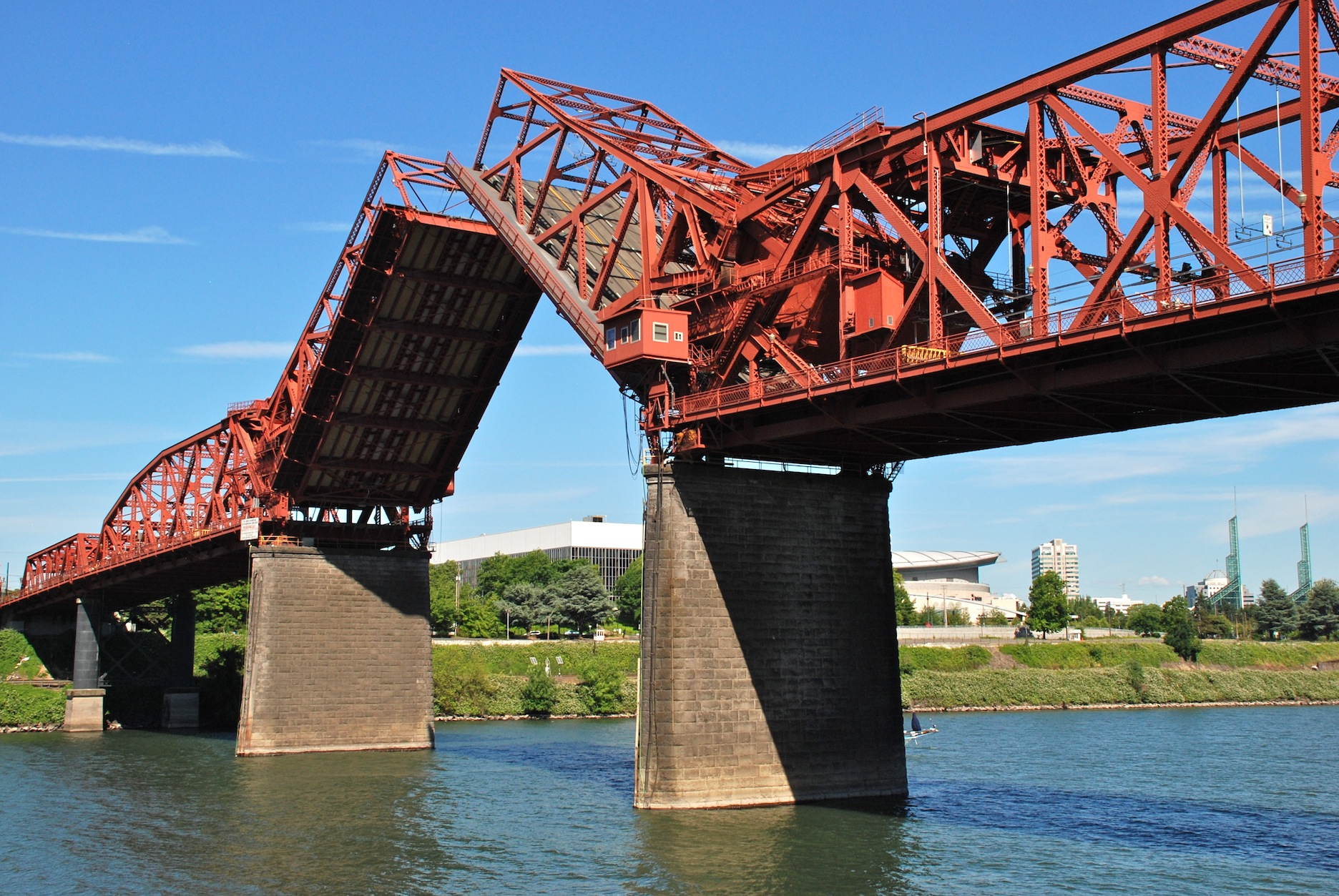
With bascule lift span opened for a ship

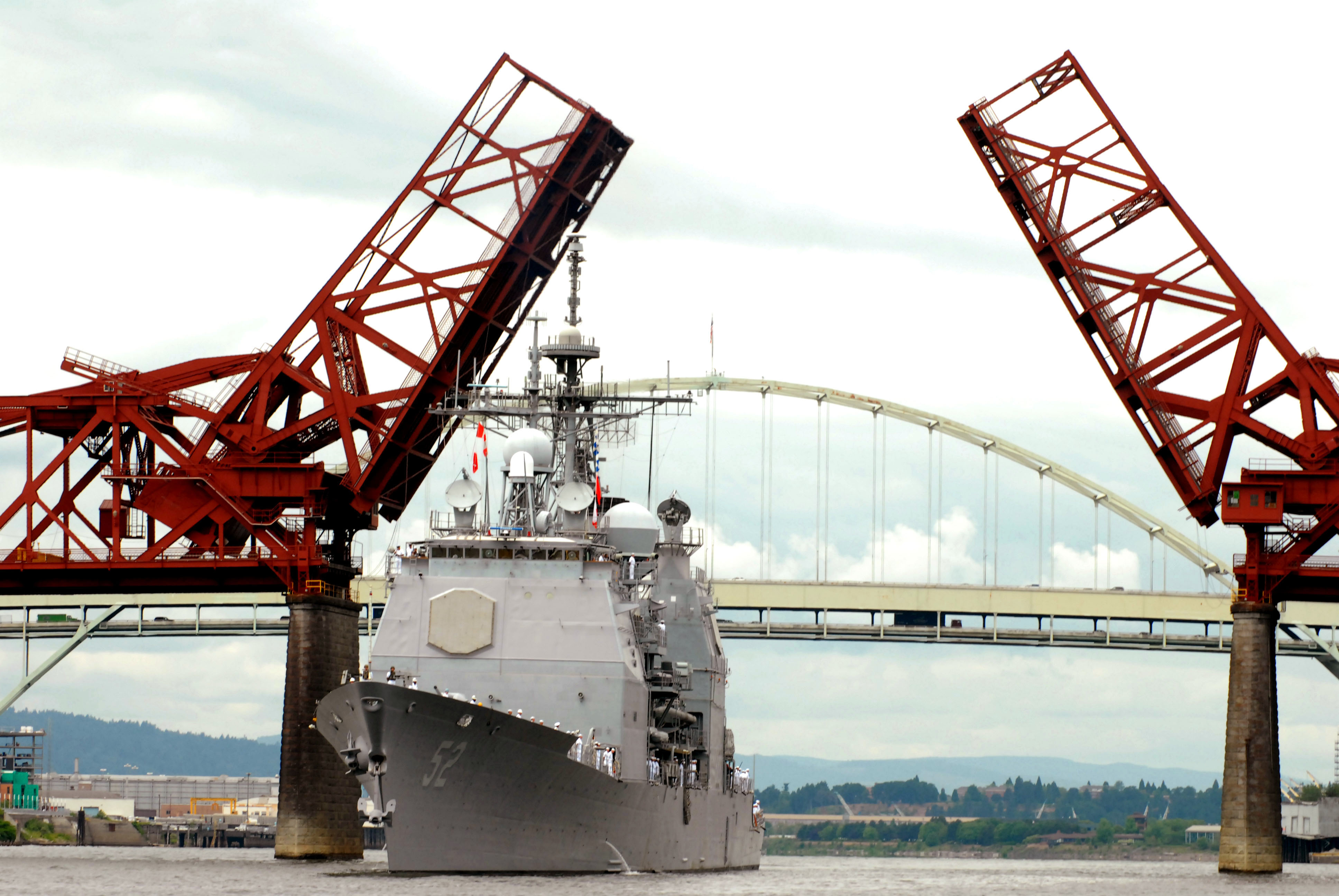
USS Bunker Hill travels through the open bridge, June 2007

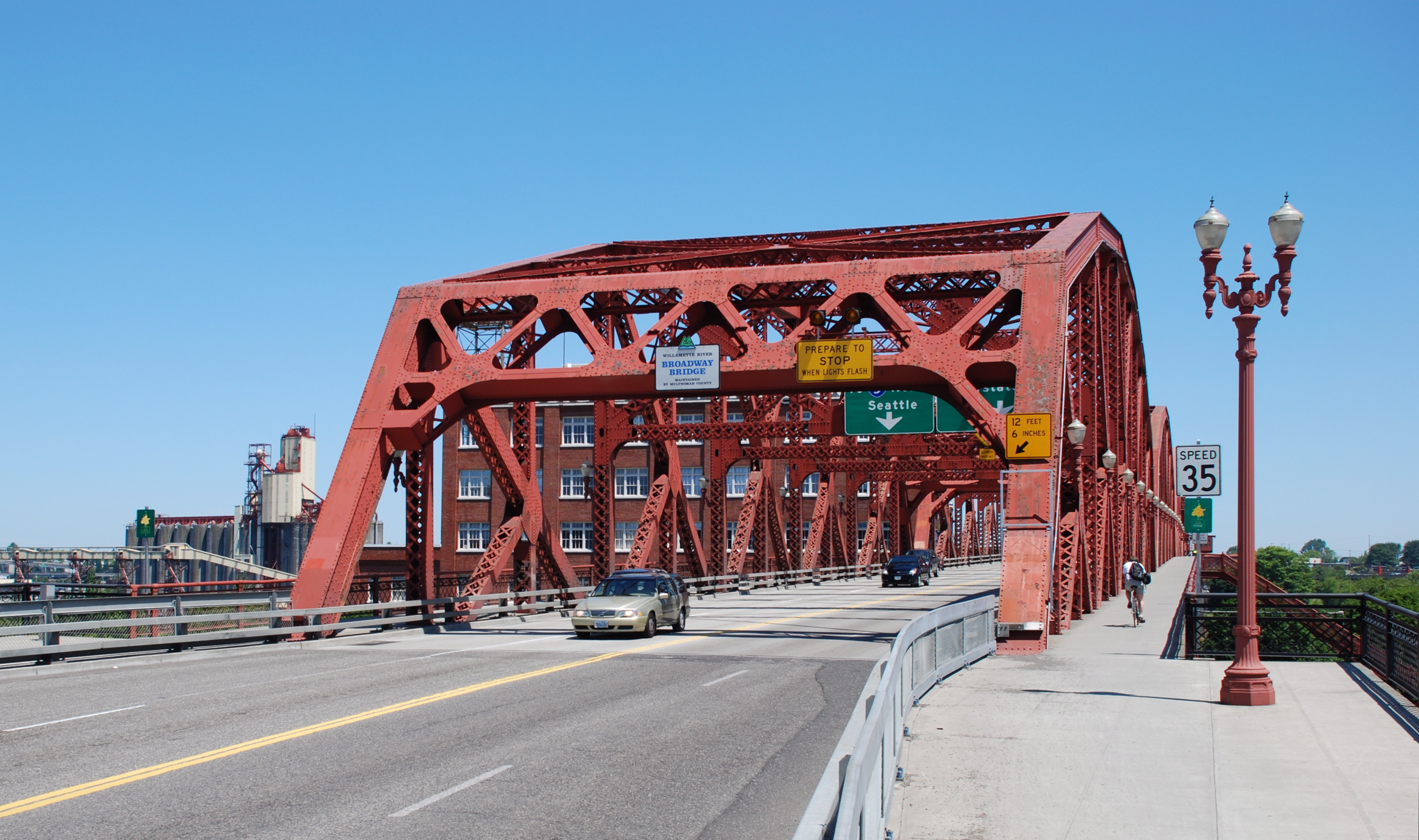
Street-level view in 2009, before streetcar tracks were relaid

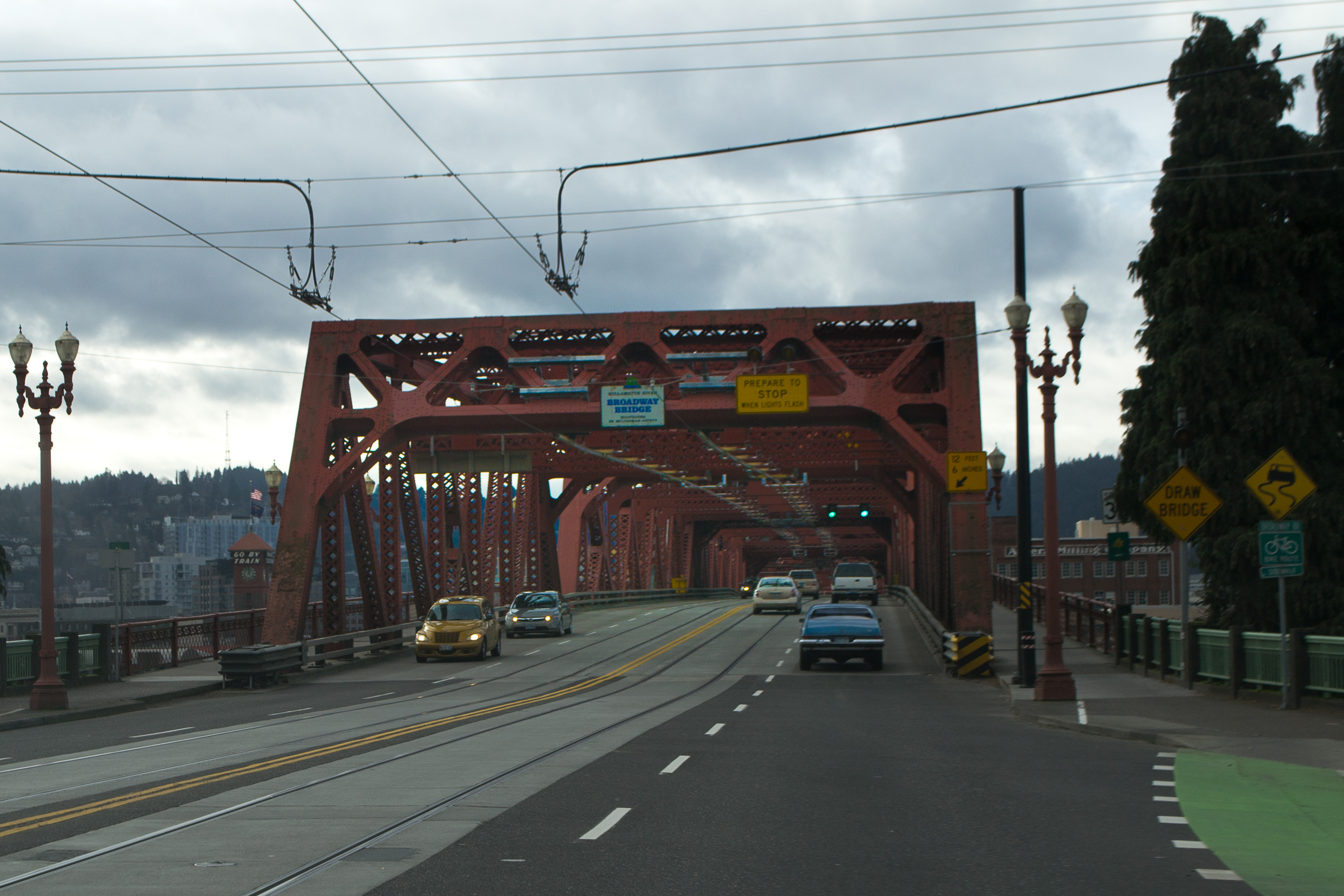
Entering the bridge from the northeast in 2012

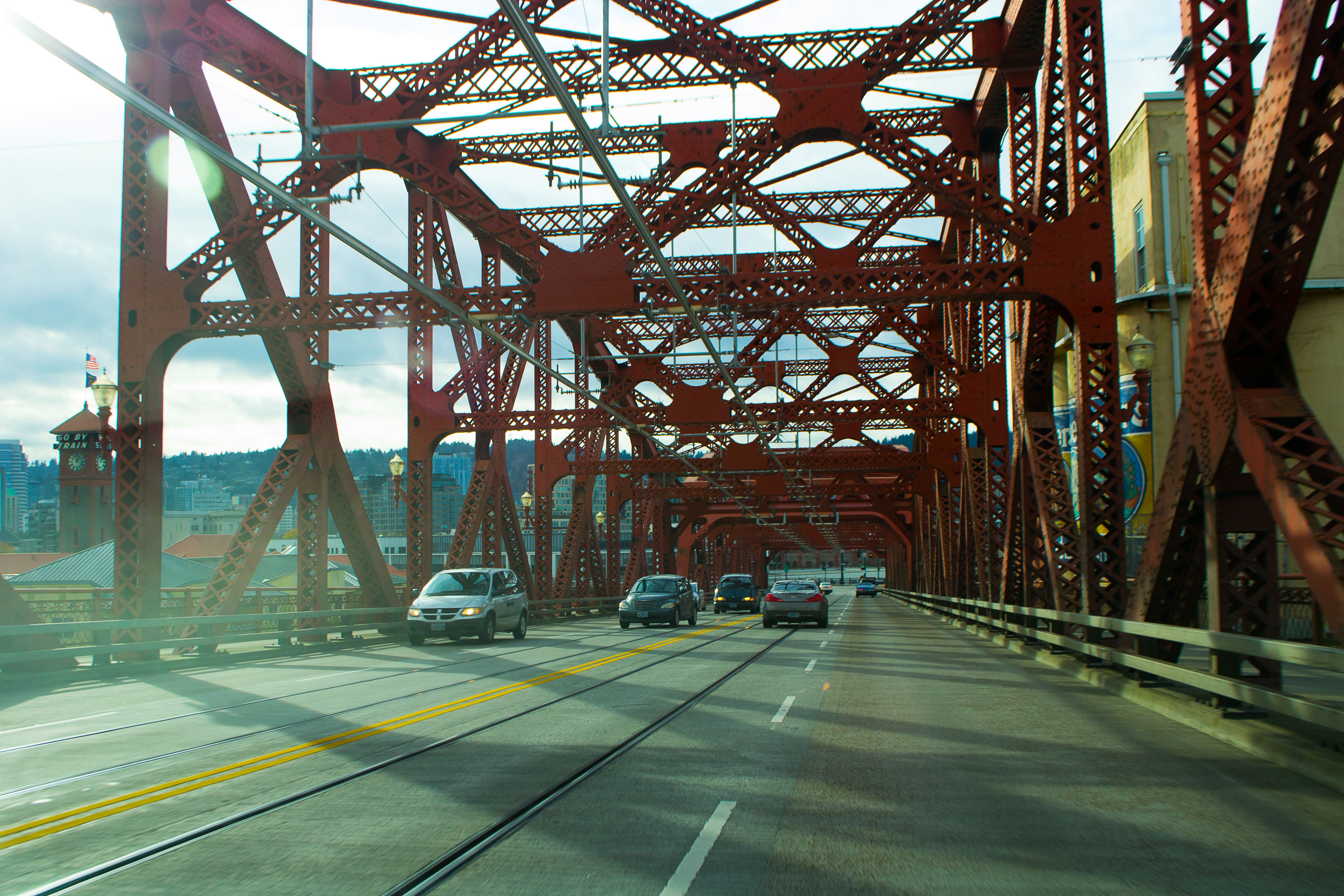
Inside the bridge

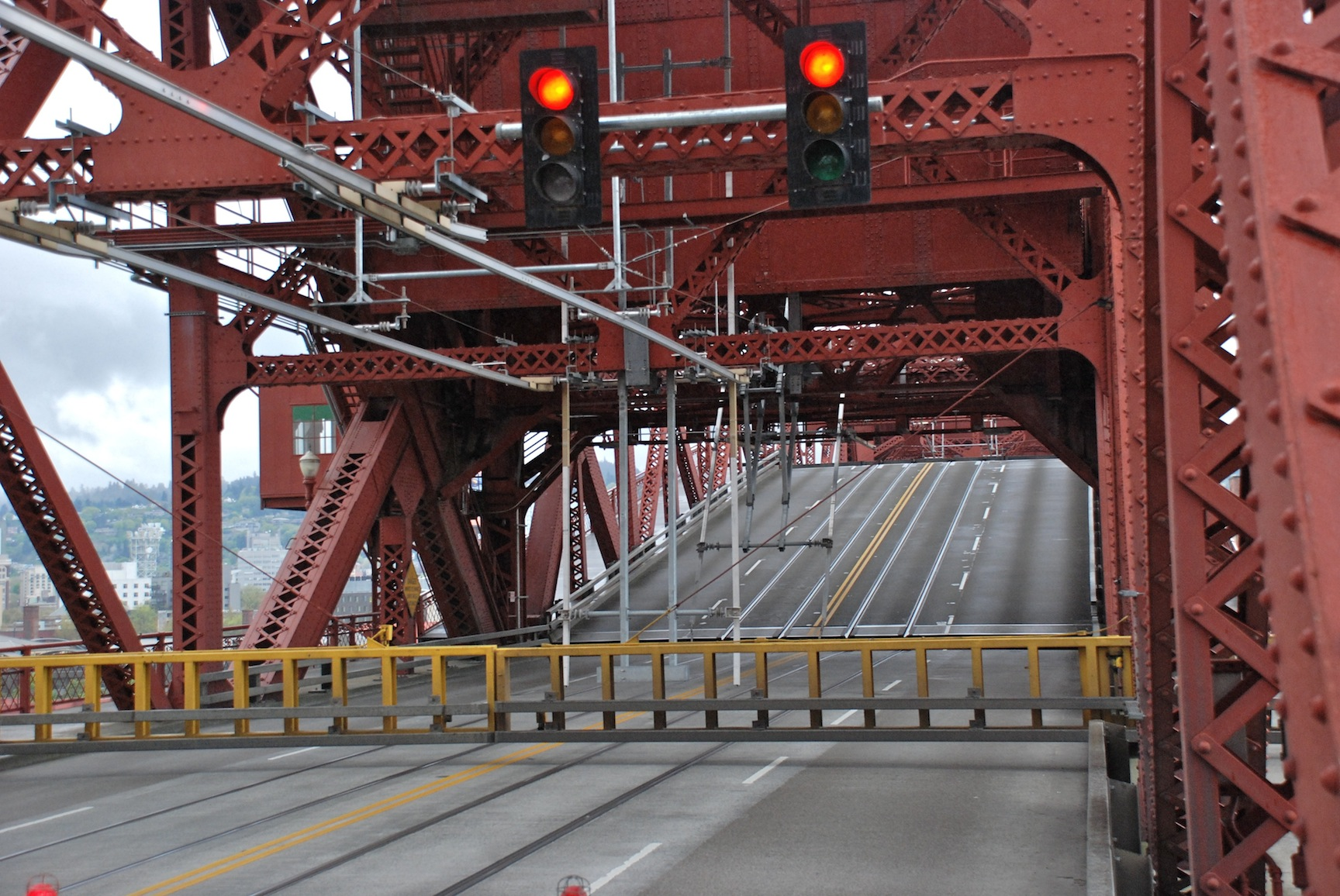
Inside the bridge during a lift

== See also ==
- List of bridges documented by the Historic American Engineering Record in Oregon
- List of bridges on the National Register of Historic Places in Oregon
- List of crossings of the Willamette River
