= The End of Violence =

- Theatrical release poster
- Directed by: Wim Wenders
- Written by: Nicholas Klein; Wim Wenders
- Produced by: Nicholas Klein; Deepak Nayar; Wim Wenders
- Starring: Bill Pullman; Andie MacDowell; Gabriel Byrne; Loren Dean; Traci Lind; Pruitt Taylor Vince
- Cinematography: Pascal Rabaud
- Edited by: Peter Przygodda
- Music by: Ry Cooder
- Production companies: Metro-Goldwyn-Mayer Pictures; CiBy 2000 Pictures; Road Movies Filmproduktion; Kintop Pictures
- Distributed by: MGM Distribution Co.
- Release date: September 12, 1997
- Running time: 122 minutes
- Country: United States
- Language: English
- Budget: $5 million
- Box office: $386,673

The End of Violence is a 1997 American drama film by the German director Wim Wenders. The film's cast includes Bill Pullman, Andie MacDowell, Gabriel Byrne, Traci Lind, Rosalind Chao, Pruitt Taylor Vince, Udo Kier, and Loren Dean, among others. It also features a soundtrack marked with the signature sounds of Wenders regulars Jon Hassell, Ry Cooder, and Bono. The film was praised by a select few critics for its cinematography, but performed poorly in the box office. It was entered into the 1997 Cannes Film Festival.

The film had a budget of $5 million, but only received $386,673 in its domestic box office.

Like many other of Wenders' American films, the film was shot in multiple locations, for instance the Griffith Observatory in Griffith Park and the Santa Monica Pier.

A scene in the film shows a live recreation of the painting Nighthawks by Edward Hopper.

== Plot ==
Film producer Mike Max meditates on the paranoia of fear of attack, in the film industry and life in general, as his wife Paige announces she is leaving him. He receives a document via email from a NASA employee whom he met earlier at a conference. Before opening it, Mike is kidnapped and almost killed, a scene captured by surveillance cameras and witnessed by computer scientist Ray Bering on surveillance footage scene in his laboratory at the Griffith Observatory.

However, it soon turns out the two men have been shot, Max has escaped and now is accused of killing them. He takes shelter with, and goes to work for, the Mexican gardeners who find him, and help him investigate who is trying to kill him and why. Bering, who originally sent Max the email and recognized Max in the surveillance footage, has a conversation with an intelligence agent who makes it clear that anyone who gets in the way of a new “anti-crime” satellite surveillance program not yet approved by Congress will be dealt with terminally.

Detective Dean Brock suspects Max is not a killer and on a tip meets with Bering, who is assassinated by a gunshot as they begin to speak. Max gives up his business and money to his wife and the film ends as he meditates on how a real attack has freed him from paranoia.

== Cast ==
- Bill Pullman as Mike Max
- Andie MacDowell as Paige Stockard
- Gabriel Byrne as Ray Bering
- Loren Dean as Detective Dean Brock
- Traci Lind as Cat
- Daniel Benzali as Brice Phelps
- K. Todd Freeman as "Six O One"
- John Diehl as Lowell Lewis
- Pruitt Taylor Vince as Frank Cray
- Peter Horton as Brian
- Udo Kier as Zoltan Kovacs
- Enrique Castillo as Ramon
- Nicole Ari Parker as Ade
- Rosalind Chao as Claire
- Marisol Padilla Sánchez as Mathilda
- Marshall Bell as Sheriff Call
- Frederic Forrest as Ranger MacDermot
- Samuel Fuller as Louis Bering

== Production ==
The film was produced through Ciby 2000 but acquired by MGM for $2-$3 million in November 1996.

== Reception ==
The End of Violence received negative reviews from critics. It holds a 29% rating on Rotten Tomatoes based on 35 reviews with an average rating of 5/10.

Roger Ebert described the film as "essentially a mess [...] like archeologists, we’re given incomplete shards of a work and asked to imagine the whole" with "everything com[ing] together, somewhat unconvincingly, at the end," but noted that "the scenes involving the Pullman character are, however, sharp-edged and on target." Writing in The New York Times, critic Stephen Holden described the film as a "brilliant puzzle" that "spins out its paranoid fantasies with a lyricism and free-spirited sense of possibility," and that it is "as resonant as [Wenders'] most memorable work." Film critic James Berardinelli reported that the film was Wenders' "most disjointed film to date," that it was " too long and too slow," and "despite having intriguing aspects, [it] is never fully satisfying." Writing in Time Out New York, Andrew Johnston observed: "Many of Wenders's best films have been road movies and Violence qualifies as one thanks to all the time the characters spend on L.A.'s freeways. Like Robert Altman's Short Cuts (which it resembles in a lot of ways), it cleverly exploits its Southern California locale and offers a truly challenging analysis of American life."
