= Untraceable =

2008 film by Gregory Hoblit

- Theatrical release poster
- Directed by: Gregory Hoblit
- Screenplay by: Robert Fyvolent; Mark Brinker; Allison Burnett
- Story by: Robert Fyvolent; Mark Brinker
- Produced by: Steven Pearl; Andy Cohen; Tom Rosenberg; Gary Lucchesi; Hawk Koch
- Starring: Diane Lane; Billy Burke; Colin Hanks; Joseph Cross; Mary Beth Hurt
- Cinematography: Anastas Michos
- Edited by: David Rosenbloom
- Music by: Christopher Young
- Production companies: Screen Gems; Lakeshore Entertainment; Cohen/Pearl Productions
- Distributed by: Sony Pictures Releasing
- Release date: January 25, 2008
- Running time: 101 minutes
- Country: United States
- Language: English
- Budget: $35 million
- Box office: $53 million

Untraceable is a 2008 American psychological thriller film directed by Gregory Hoblit and starring Diane Lane, Colin Hanks, Billy Burke, and Joseph Cross. It was distributed by Screen Gems. The film was released in the United States on January 25, 2008, to negative reviews, and it grossed $53 million at the worldwide box office against its $35 million budget.

Set in Portland, Oregon, the film involves a serial killer who rigs contraptions that kill his victims based on the number of hits received by a website, KillWithMe.com, that features a live streaming video of the victim. Millions of people log on, hastening the victims' deaths.

== Plot ==
FBI Special Agent Jennifer Marsh is a widowed single parent living in a suburban Portland home with her daughter, Annie Haskins, and her mother, Stella Marsh. At night, she works in the FBI's cybercrime division with Griffin Dowd, fighting identity theft and similar crimes. One night, an anonymous tip leads them to a website called KillWithMe.com. The site features a streaming video of a cat being tortured and killed. The website cannot be shut down, as the creator knew that someone would try and built into it a fail-safe; every time the server is closed, a mirror server immediately replaces it.

After the cat's death, KillWithMe.com's webmaster graduates to human victims, kidnapping them and placing them in death traps that are progressively activated by the number of hits the website receives. The first victim is a helicopter pilot, Herbert Miller (bled to death by injections of anticoagulant), followed by a newscaster, David Williams (burnt to death by heat lamps while cemented into the floor). At a press conference, the public is urged to avoid the website, but as Jennifer feared, this only increases the site's popularity. Griffin is kidnapped after investigating a lead based on his hunch as to the killer's identity and receiving a phone call from the killer disguising his voice and posing as one of Griffin's jilted blind dates. In the killer's basement, he is submerged up to his neck in a vat of water with his mouth taped shut; the death trap introduces into the water a concentration of sulfuric acid. After the killer leaves the room, Griffin uses his dying moments to blink a message in morse code, giving the FBI the lead he was following up on.

Jennifer follows up on the Morse code message to discover that the victims were not random; they were involved in broadcasting or presenting the suicide of a junior college professor. The professor's unstable tech prodigy son, Owen Reilly, broke down and was admitted to a psychiatric hospital. When released, he decided to take revenge and prove a point: that the public's interest in the suffering of others is insatiable, as well as to wreak vengeance on those he felt had exploited his father's death. The police raid Owen's house, but he is not present. Owen has been following Jennifer because he is now obsessed with her. He captures and places Jennifer in a makeshift death trap: hanging her above a cultivator and progressively lowering her to her death as more people enter the website. Jennifer escapes by swinging out of the way and grabbing a pillar to pull herself onto the ground. She breaks free and pins down the murderer, fatally shooting Owen as the police arrive. Owen's death was being broadcast, just like his father's. Jennifer then displays her FBI badge to the webcam. While the chatter in the website's chat room dwindles, statements are made such as "You go girl!", "Glad the killer is dead" and another one saying "a genius died today". The final comment asks where the video can be downloaded.

== Cast ==
- Diane Lane as Jennifer Marsh
- Billy Burke as Detective Eric Box
- Colin Hanks as Griffin Dowd
- Joseph Cross as Owen Reilly
- Mary Beth Hurt as Stella Marsh
- Peter Lewis as Richard Brooks
- Tyrone Giordano as Tim Wilks
- Perla Haney-Jardine as Annie Haskins
- Tim De Zarn as Herbert Miller
- Christopher Cousins as David Williams
- Jesse Tyler Ferguson as Arthur James Elmer

== Production ==
In March 2002, it was reported that Screen Gems had acquired a spec script, then known as Streaming Evil, by Robert Fyvolent and Mark Brinker centering on a team within the FBI Cyber Division who try to track down a serial killer who shows his murders on a website. The script marked the first screen writing effort of both Fyvolent and Brinker, who had primarily worked as an attorney for Newmarket Films and orthopedic surgeon in Houston, Texas respectively. In October 2006, it was reported that Diane Lane had signed on as the lead for the film, which had since been rewritten by Allison Burnett under the new title of Untraceable with Gregory Hoblit directing. In January 2007, Colin Hanks, Billy Burke, Joseph Cross, and Mary Beth Hurt joined the cast.

The film was shot in and around Portland, Oregon. A temporary studio was constructed in Clackamas, Oregon, where all non-location photography was done, mostly interiors, including the FBI's cyber division, Jennifer Marsh's house, the FBI building elevator, several basements, etc. A scene set on the east end of the Broadway Bridge was shot both on the actual bridge as well as at the studio. A faux diner was built underneath the Broadway bridge, which was used in the movie. The birthday party for Perla Haney-Jardine's character Annie was filmed in the roller skating rink of Oaks Amusement Park.

== Home media ==
On May 13, 2008, Untraceable was released on DVD, Blu-ray and UMD. The DVD included an audio commentary and four featurettes.

== Reception ==
=== Box office ===
The film had an opening weekend of $11.3 million in the U.S. It went on to gross $53 million worldwide.

=== Critical response ===
Untraceable received negative reviews from critics. Review aggregation website Rotten Tomatoes gives the film a score of 16% based on 144 reviews, with the site's consensus being, "Despite Diane Lane's earnest effort, Untraceable manages to be nothing more than a run-of-the-mill thriller with a hypocritical message". Metacritic, which uses a weighted average, assigned the film a score of 32 out of 100, based on 30 critics, indicating "generally unfavorable" reviews. Audiences polled by CinemaScore gave the film an average grade of "B−" on an A+ to F scale.

Several critics viewed the film as hypocritical for indulging in the "torture porn" it condemns. It also met criticism for its climax which was seen as devolving into horror film clichés. Lane was praised for her performance in the film. Roger Ebert gave the film a favorable review, giving the film a 3 out of 4 star rating.

Peter Travers of Rolling Stone gave the film a strongly negative review, giving it zero stars and insisting readers not watch the film.
