= Hostage (TV series) =

British television series

- Promotional poster
- Genre: Political thriller
- Created by: Matt Charman
- Written by: Matt Charman
- Directed by: Isabelle Sieb; Amy Neil
- Starring: Suranne Jones; Julie Delpy; Corey Mylchreest; Ashley Thomas; Martin McCann; Lucian Msamati; James Cosmo; Jehnny Beth
- Music by: Jeff Russo
- Country of origin: United Kingdom
- Original language: English
- No. of episodes: 5

Production
- Executive producers: Matt Charman; Foz Allan; Steve Searle; Suranne Jones
- Running time: 38–46 minutes
- Production companies: Teammakers Productions; Binocular Productions

Original release
- Network: Netflix
- Release: 21 August 2025

Hostage is a British political thriller miniseries written by Matt Charman and directed by Isabelle Sieb Amy Nail, starring Suranne Jones and Julie Delpy as the fictional British prime minister and French president respectively. It premiered on Netflix on 21 August 2025.

== Premise ==
An international summit between the French and British leaders goes awry when the husband of the British Prime Minister is kidnapped and the French president is blackmailed.

== Cast ==
- Suranne Jones as Abigail Dalton, the Prime Minister of the United Kingdom, First Lord of the Treasury, Minister for the Civil Service, Minister for the Union and MP for Oldham, who previously served as the junior Foreign Minister
- Julie Delpy as Vivienne Toussaint, the President of France who is running for re-election
- Corey Mylchreest as Matheo Lewis, Toussaint’s activist stepson
- Lucian Msamati as Kofi Adomako, the Downing Street Chief of Staff
- Ashley Thomas as Dr Alex Anderson, Dalton’s husband and a member of Doctors Without Borders, who is kidnapped in French Guiana
- James Cosmo as Max Dalton, Abigail’s terminally ill father and Sylvie’s grandfather
- Jehnny Beth as Adrienne Pelletier, the Secretary-General of the President's Office
- Martin McCann as John Michael Shagan, a former soldier and leader of the kidnappers
- Sara Powell as Kathy MacIntyre, the Foreign Secretary
- Mark Lewis Jones as General Joseph Livingston, the Chief of the Defence Staff
- Isobel Akuwudike as Sylvie Jane Anderson, Abigail and Alex’s teenage daughter
- Hiftu Quasem as Ayesha, a political staffer and investigator working for Dalton
- Sophie Robertson as Saskia Morgan, Matheo Lewis’s girlfriend and a former soldier
- Pip Carter as Dan Ogilvy, the Defence Secretary and later Acting Prime Minister
- Paul Thornley as Michael Hall, the Home Secretary
- Zubin Varla as Oliver Bahrami, the Leader of the Opposition
- Josh Barrow as Tristan Taylor, the Political Secretary
- Ami Okumura Jones as Zadie Nishimura, the Downing Street Press Secretary
- Vincent Perez as Elias Vernier, Toussaint's husband, Matheo's father and a French media tycoon

== Episodes ==
| No. | Title | Directed by | Written by | Original release date |
|---|---|---|---|---|
| 1 | Episode 1 | Isabelle Sieb | Matt Charman | 21 August 2025 |
Recently elected Prime Minister Abigail Dalton meets with right wing French President Vivienne Toussaint, who is running for re-election. Toussaint offers to provide the drugs required by the NHS in exchange for stationing French Army soldiers in the UK to deter illegal migrant crossings. Dr. Alex Anderson, Dalton’s husband, is kidnapped with several Doctors Without Borders colleagues on a mission in French Guiana, with the perpetrators demanding Dalton resign within 24 hours. Toussaint promises to instruct the French Foreign Legion to extract him, but in exchange, she demands Dalton acquiesce to her demands for French border forces and soldiers to be stationed on British soil. The kidnappers are tipped off that Toussaint is organising a rescue. Toussaint meets with her stepson, Matheo Lewis, at a London gala. Thomas Mercer, an embedded MI6 agent, locates Anderson and prepares to extract with French forces. However, Toussaint receives a blackmail video of her in bed with Matheo, with threats to release footage unless the rescue is abandoned and Dalton resigns. Toussaint aborts the mission as Alex and his colleagues are driven away.
| 2 | Episode 2 | Isabelle Sieb | Matt Charman | 21 August 2025 |
Toussaint tells Matheo she is being blackmailed and can’t help Dalton, but allows his friend to analyse her phone. He demands she stop having his current girlfriend, Saskia, followed, but reveals who has been tracking her. Chief of the Defence Staff General Livingston advises Dalton that intervention will be difficult without French military approval. Adomako, Dalton’s Chief of Staff, recommends she inform the Cabinet. Mercer is captured by the kidnappers, and Alex saves his life. Dalton tells Sylvie her dad is a hostage. In a COBRA meeting, Dalton witnesses Alex's colleague being executed, and Sylvie accuses her of endangering him by not resigning. Alex tries to plead with the kidnappers, whose leader tells him he had a daughter as well. Toussaint and Dalton reveal to each other how they are being blackmailed, but neither is willing to tell the truth to escape. Simon Kingsley, a reporter, publishes the story globally outside of D-Notice jurisdiction. Dalton announces her position in a press conference, confirming she will not resign and that Toussaint has also been blackmailed. Adrienne Pelletier, Toussaint's chief of staff, receives a call from John Shagan, the lead kidnapper, who tells her she is on the ground for a reason.
| 3 | Episode 3 | Isabelle Sieb | Matt Charman | 21 August 2025 |
Dalton raises the threat level to critical and is confronted in the House of Commons after a child dies from an asthma attack due to medication shortages. She maintains her position and refuses to resign. Sylvie confesses she leaked the story to Kingsley. Toussaint agrees to re-launch the rescue and provide the UK with drugs in exchange for Dalton investigating both their staffs to identify the traitor. Elias, Toussaint’s media mogul husband, tries to distract from the news reports of the blackmail. Dalton has an investigator, Ayesha, run background checks on both teams, and discovers Adomako recently received a large payment to a Cayman Islands account. A French Special Forces team is deployed and rescues the group, but another of Alex’s colleagues is killed. Adomako catches Pelletier trying to tip off the kidnappers and has her arrested but is still suspended by Dalton pending an investigation. Shagan returns to the UK and, with a team dressed as police officers, instigates a riot at a vigil for the child. He tells Dalton the country will now burn. Saskia is revealed to be working with the kidnappers and kills Dalton's hospitalised father.
| 4 | Episode 4 | Amy Neil | Matt Charman | 21 August 2025 |
Violent protests orchestrated by Shagan erupt across the country, ostensibly due to the drug shortage. After Home Secretary Michael Hall is violently attacked by protestors, the Cabinet urges Dalton to step down and have Defence Secretary Dan Ogilvy to take over as interim leader. The footage of Toussaint and Matheo has been leaked. Toussaint tells Elias she wants a divorce, and he argues that without his media backing her, she will lose re-election. Anderson identifies Shagan's voice in a recording as the man who shot his colleague. Saskia is instructed to kill Pelletier as she is transferred from the French Embassy, but misses the shot. Dalton and Toussaint announce a drug supply agreement to the press, with Toussaint saying she will no longer allow the wrong people to influence her. Dalton loses a no-confidence vote. Matheo brings Saskia’s laptop to 10 Downing Street, which implicates her in killing Dalton’s father. Toussaint and Dalton discover she is an ex-soldier whose battalion was shut down in Dalton's Ministry of Defence budget cuts. Shagan detonates a bomb hidden in the laptop, which kills Toussaint instead of Dalton, his intended target.
| 5 | Episode 5 | Amy Neil | Matt Charman | 21 August 2025 |
During her time as a junior Foreign Office minister Dalton orders British civilians to be evacuated from Belize after Guatemala invades, leaving local support staff behind. General Livingston is revealed to be behind the conspiracy and giving Shagan his orders. Ogilvy, now acting Prime Minister, declares a state of emergency following the explosion and deploys the British Army to the streets. Dalton’s team discovered both Shagan and Livingston were stationed in Belize during the evacuation. With the help of Foreign Secretary Kathy MacIntyre, Dalton enters Ministry of Defence Headquarters and confronts Livingston, who is arrested after implicating himself in a fit of rage after criticizing her military cuts. Shagan and Saskia kidnap Anderson, Sylvie and Matheo at a safehouse, killing two Protection Command officers. Shagan demands that Dalton take their place. Matheo secretly calls 999 and then fights Saskia but allows her to flee. Shagan tells Dalton his pregnant Belizean fiancée was killed by invading forces after Dalton ordered only British staff to be evacuated. Before he can kill Dalton, Sylvie takes Saskia’s discarded pistol and shoots Shagan after he confesses to killing her grandfather. The no-confidence vote is voided, and Dalton is reinstated as Prime Minister. Three months later, she announces a general election and, in tribute to Toussaint, promises utmost honesty with the electorate.

== Production ==
The series is written by Matt Charman. Netflix is producing together with Binocular Productions. Julie Delpy and Suranne Jones were confirmed in the lead roles in March 2024. The cast also includes Corey Mylchreest, Lucian Msamati, Ashley Thomas, James Cosmo and Jehnny Beth. Filming began that month with the working title The Choice. Filming locations include the UK and La Palma on the Canary Islands. In January 2025, the title of the show was reported as Hostage.

== Release ==
The five-episode limited series premiered on Netflix on 21 August 2025.

== Reception ==
The review aggregator website Rotten Tomatoes reported an 82% approval rating based on 33 critic reviews. The website's critics consensus reads, "Anchored by Suranne Jones and Julie Delpy's authoritative performances, Hostage careens from one shocking twist to another while holding viewers' attention captive." Metacritic, which uses a weighted average, gave a score of 62 out of 100 based on 14 critics, indicating "generally favorable".

Reviewing the series for The Guardian, Lucy Mangan gave a rating of 4/5 and described it as "a rollicking, propulsive and compulsive yarn that also manages to give two great parts to two women of a certain age then leaves them to get on with it as characters rather than symbols."

In contrast, James Delingpole for The Spectator was critical of the series, describing it as "an act of cultural aggression, almost a humiliation ritual."
