= Traci Lind =

American actress (born 1968)

- Born: April 1968 (age 58)
- Occupation: Actress
- Years active: 1984–1997

Traci Lind is a retired American film actress known for playing Janine in the 1990 film The Handmaid's Tale, Missy McCloud in My Boyfriend's Back, and stuntwoman Cat in Wim Wenders' The End of Violence. She also had supporting roles in several other films including Nurse Graves in The Road to Wellville, Christie Langford in Class of 1999, and Natalie St. Clair in Bugsy.

Prior to her film career, Lind played the role of Pru Shepherd on the soap opera Ryan's Hope from 1984 to 1985. She also had a starring role in the video for Lou Gramm's hit song "Midnight Blue", released in January 1987.

She began modeling at age 13 after being discovered by the Elite agency's head, John Casablancas. In 1997, Lind went public with accusations of abuse regarding former boyfriend Dodi Fayed, who later died in a car accident along with his new partner, Diana, Princess of Wales. Later that same year, she retired from acting, saying in a 2013 interview: "I am an intensely private person, so the whole acting thing was just the wrong path for me."

== Filmography ==
=== Film ===
Year	Title	Role	Notes
1986	My Little Girl	Alice	
1987	A Tiger's Tale	Penny	
1988	Fright Night Part 2	Alex	As Traci Lin
1988	Moving	Natalie	
1988	Survival Quest	Olivia	
1989	Spellcaster	Yvette	As Traci Lin
1990	Class of 1999	Christie Langford	As Traci Lin
1990	The Handmaid's Tale	Janine / Ofwarren	
1991	Voyager	Charlene	
1991	No Secrets	Sam	
1991	Bugsy	Natalie St. Clair	
1993	My Boyfriend's Back	Missy McCloud	
1994	The Road to Wellville	Nurse Irene Graves	
1996	Kiss & Tell	Molly's Roommate	
1997	Red Meat	Connie	
1997	The End of Violence	Cat	
1997	No Strings Attached	Sara Robbins	
1997	Cadillac	Missy	

=== Television ===
Year	Title	Role	Notes
1984	Ryan's Hope	Pru Shepherd	Contract role (1984–1985)
1986	Club Med	Simone LaFontanne	TV film
1987	Casanova	Heidi	TV film
1987	Fame	Joanna	Episode: "Ian's Girl"
1987	21 Jump Street	Nadia	Episode: "America, What a Town"
1987	CBS Schoolbreak Special	Susan Atherton	Episode: "Juvi"
1987	Werewolf	Chrissy	Episode: "The Unicorn"
1988	Ohara	Amy Allen	Episode: "Open Season"
1988	CBS Summer Playhouse	Sharon	Episode: "Sniff"
1988	Life on the Flipside	Better Bea Day	TV film
1990	Sky High	Dawn	TV film
1994	Model by Day	Jae	TV film
1996	Code Name: Wolverine	Monica Gordini	TV film
