= My Oxford Year =

2025 romantic drama film

- Promotional poster
- Directed by: Iain Morris
- Screenplay by: Allison Burnett; Melissa Osborne
- Based on: My Oxford Year by Julia Whelan
- Produced by: Laura Quicksilver; George Berman
- Starring: Sofia Carson; Corey Mylchreest
- Cinematography: Remi Adefarasin
- Edited by: Victoria Boydell; Kristina Hetherington
- Music by: Isabella Summers
- Production company: Temple Hill Entertainment
- Distributed by: Netflix
- Release date: August 1, 2025
- Running time: 113 minutes
- Countries: United States; United Kingdom
- Language: English

My Oxford Year is a 2025 romantic comedy-drama film directed by Iain Morris and written by Allison Burnett and Melissa Osborne, based on the novel of the same name by Julia Whelan, which was adapted from Burnett's original screenplay. It stars Sofia Carson and Corey Mylchreest.

The film was released on Netflix on August 1, 2025. It received generally unfavorable reviews from critics.

== Plot ==
Anna De La Vega is an American student travelling to study Victorian poetry for a year at the University of Oxford. On her first day, she gets splashed by Jamie Davenport in his vintage Jaguar sports car. Later, she finds out he will be teaching one of her classes. She mocks him initially, but they end up spending a fun night together which involves Anna's first time in a pub. However, Jamie seemingly rejects her at the end of the night which leads to Anna deciding to make him jealous by dancing with another man.

The next day Jamie shows Anna a special book, and they reconcile. Then, they are intimate, with both agreeing to keep things casual, "fun". Anna talks to Cecilia, a close friend of Jamie, who warns her away. Over the months, they become closer and finally Jamie invites Anna to his place.

Jamie reveals that his brother Eddie died, and he and his father no longer talk. In the morning, he appears distant. Anna attends the Oxford vs Cambridge boat race in London with her friends, but she has not seen Jamie for a week supposedly due to his studying. However, she finds out that he has not been at the library in weeks, and that Cecilia has also been busy for a week.

Anna angrily goes to Jamie's place to confront him and finds Cecilia and Jamie, who is receiving medical treatment. He shouts at her to get out. Later, Jamie reveals the truth to Anna. Celia had been Eddie's girlfriend and he had died of an aggressive, genetic cancer, which is now afflicting Jamie. What Anna saw was his last treatment, as he refuses to do any more due to the pain, which is why his father is angry. Jamie insists Anna not waste her time on him, but she references one of their first conversations, saying he should not suffer alone.

Jamie agrees to take Anna to the ball, where they meet his parents. Jamie's dad privately speaks with Anna, trying to get her to convince Jamie to return home for the best possible treatment. Jamie is still dismissive, and at the end of the night, he is weak and collapses at home. He is sent to hospital to recover and Anna sees his upset father outside.

For Anna's birthday, she drives Jamie's car to visit his stately home where he grew up. There, her friends surprise her for her birthday celebration. Jamie continues to avoid his father, who talks about a new drug. However, he does not want to spend the time he has left in a hospital. Jamie reveals to Anna that Eddie died here.

After her present opening, Anna finds Jamie reconciled with his father, building a model car that she gifted to him, just as they did when Jamie and Eddie were younger. Anna's friends find out that Jamie has cancer, and Anna tells Jamie she loves him.

When Anna receives a birthday call from her parents, she tells her mother she is staying in England instead of returning to New York to take her job. Jamie is angry at Anna's decision against her future and they argue, causing Anna to sleep in a separate room and Jamie to smash the model car his father and he worked on.

Anna decides to return to America as Jamie does not want her to stay. She graduates, and has not spoken with Jamie for a while. They talk again, and Anna wants to remain with him while he fears she will regret it, but they eventually reconcile and are intimate.

The next morning, Anna finds Jamie unresponsive. In hospital, a doctor reveals that he has developed a critical case of pneumonia as the cancer has weakened his immune system, and he requires treatment. Jamie's father finally accepts Jamie's wish and refuses. Jamie and Anna dream of travelling together to Europe as he dies in her arms. A time skip shows Anna going on to travel Europe alone, and eventually teaching the same class Jamie taught her in.

== Cast ==
- Sofia Carson as Anna De La Vega
- Corey Mylchreest as Jamie Davenport
- Dougray Scott as William Davenport
- Catherine McCormack as Antonia Davenport
- Harry Trevaldwyn as Charlie Butler
- Hugh Coles as Ridley
- Poppy Gilbert as Cecelia Knowles
- Barney Harris as Ian

== Production ==
My Oxford Year was directed by Iain Morris and written by Allison Burnett and Melissa Osborne, based on the novel of the same name by Julia Whelan, which was adapted from Burnett's original screenplay. Laura Quicksilver and George Berman worked as producers for Temple Hill Entertainment with the film released on streaming service Netflix. The cast is led by Sofia Carson and Corey Mylchreest. It also includes Dougray Scott, Catherine McCormack, Harry Trevaldwyn, and Hugh Coles. Principal photography took place in September 2024 in England with filming locations including the University of Oxford at the Bodleian Library, Magdalen College, St Hugh's College and Hertford College, and also in the town of Windsor.

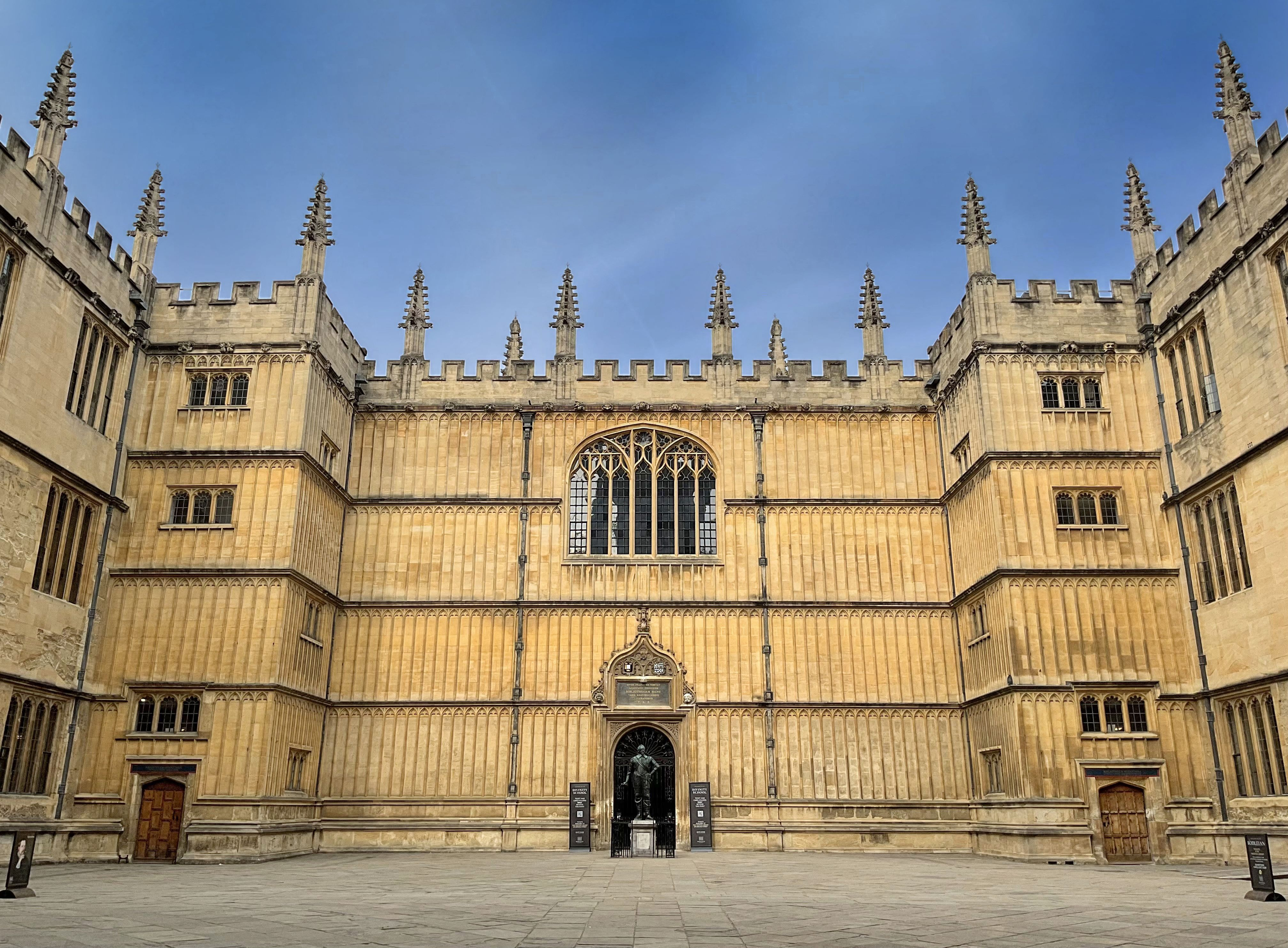
Bodleian Library

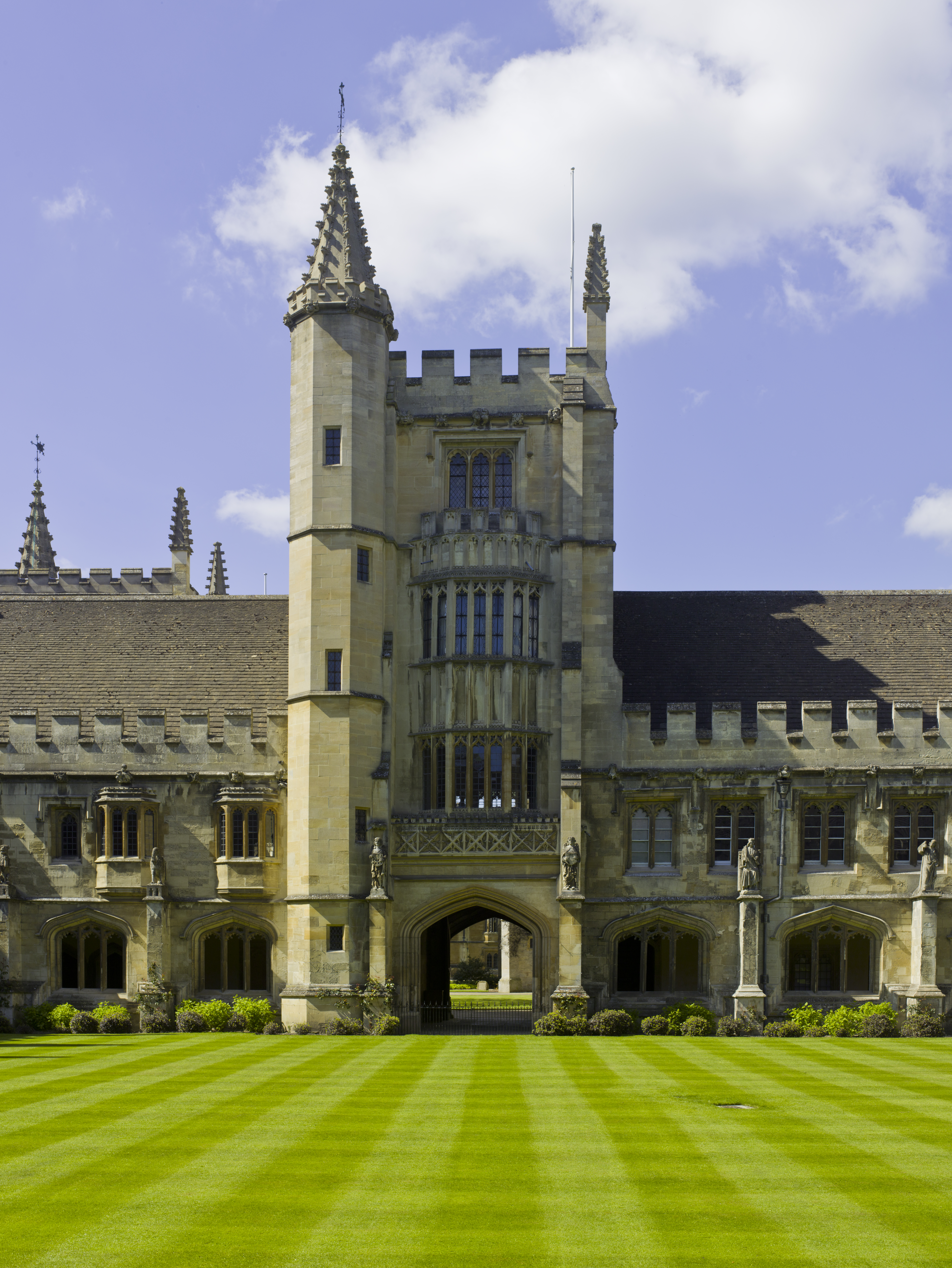
Magdalen College, Oxford

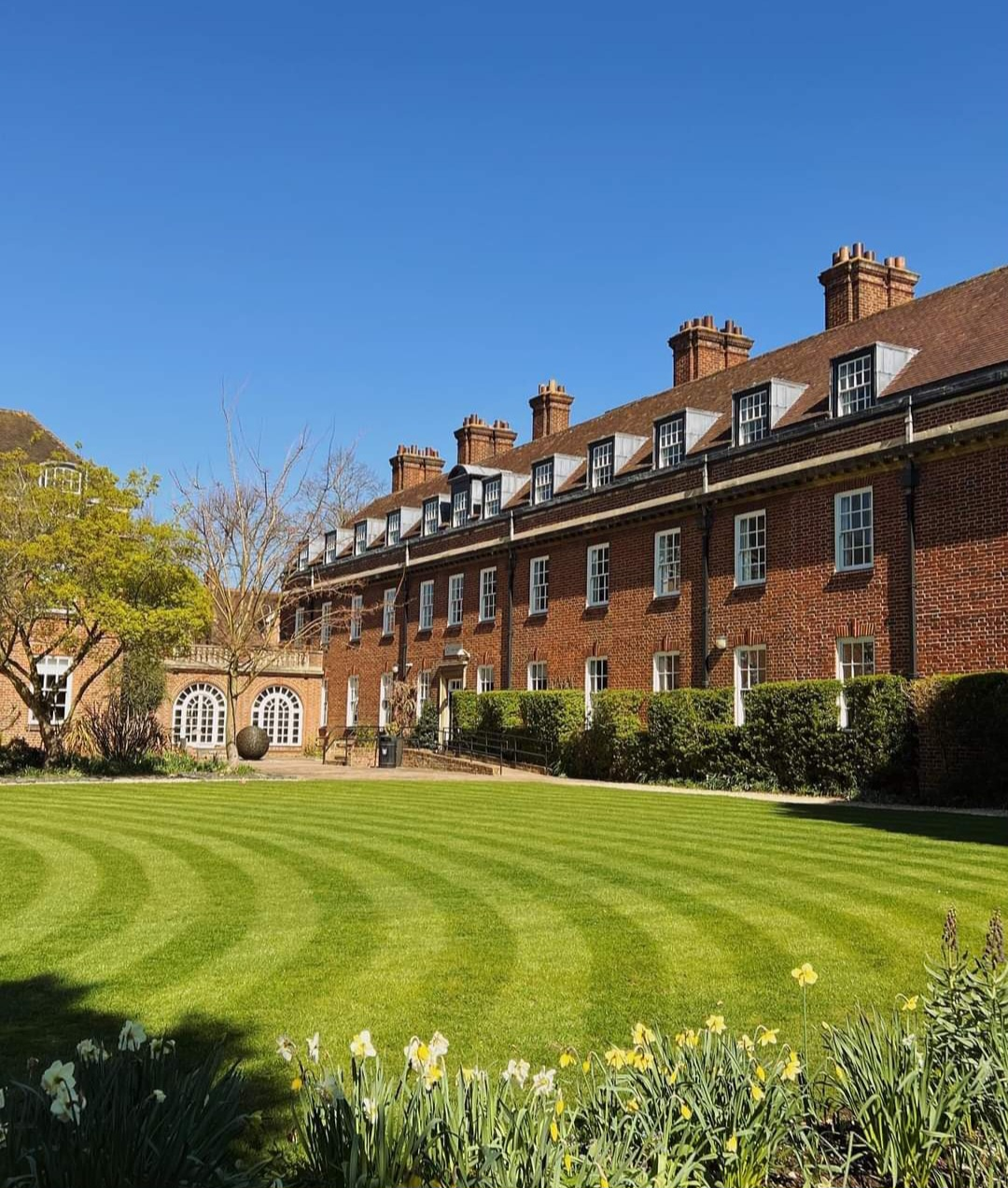
St Hugh's College, Oxford

== Release ==
My Oxford Year was released on Netflix on August 1, 2025.

== Reception ==
=== Viewership ===
The film was ranked at number 1 in Netflix's Global Top 10 Movies list as of August 3, 2025. It was Netflix's fourth most-watched movie of all time with 158.8 million views.

=== Critical response ===
On the review aggregator website Rotten Tomatoes, 31% of 35 critics' reviews are positive, with an average rating of 5/10. The website's consensus reads: "Pretty to look at but dramatically inert, My Oxford Year may have the right pedigree as a romantic dramedy but flunks out on the fundamentals." Metacritic, which uses a weighted average, assigned the film a score of 39 out of 100, based on 9 critics, indicating "generally unfavorable" reviews.

India Today gave the film a 3.5 out of 5 star rating. The German film website film-datenbank.eu gave My Oxford Year 82 out of 100 points. Honcques Laus, a scholar at the University of Oxford, critiques the film for its deficiencies in portraying the university's ceremonies and traditions. For instance, the film misconstrues the Master of Arts from Oxford as an academic degree, omits Classical Latin from the matriculation ceremony, misrepresents matriculation as a solitary journey, and mislocates the college ball. However, he acknowledges the accurate inclusion of the subfusc, the Sheldonian Theatre as the setting for ceremonies, and the use of DPhil as an abbreviation for Doctor of Philosophy at Oxford.

== See also ==
- Surprised by Oxford
