= Red Meat (film) =

- Directed by: Allison Burnett
- Written by: Allison Burnett
- Produced by: Josh Evans; Caradoc Ehrenhalt; Thomas Garvin; H. Michael Heuser; Zachary Matz
- Starring: John Slattery; James Frain; Stephen Mailer; Traci Lind; Lara Flynn Boyle; Jennifer Grey; Heidi Lenhart; Andrea Roth
- Cinematography: Charlie Lieberman
- Edited by: Sloane Klevin
- Music by: Mark Fontana; Tom Charles Maxwell; Mark C. Sproull; Bron Tieman
- Distributed by: Peninsula Films; The Asylum
- Release date: 1997
- Running time: 95 minutes
- Country: United States
- Language: English

Red Meat is a 1997 American black comedy-drama film written and directed by Allison Burnett.

== Plot ==
At a restaurant, male friends Chris, Stefan and Victor recount recent experiences they've had with women.

== Cast ==
- Stephen Mailer as Chris
- John Slattery as Stefan
- James Frain as Victor
- Lara Flynn Boyle as Ruth
- Dee Freeman as Prostitute
- Jennifer Grey as Candice
- Anna Karin as Ula
- Heidi Lenhart as Mia
- Traci Lind as Connie
- Billie Neal as Donna
- Julia Pearlstein as Isis
- Andrea Roth as Nan

== Production ==
When writing the screenplay for what would eventually become Red Meat, director Allison Burnett reimagined and repurposed scenes from an unpublished first novel, titled Orwell’s Year, which was written ten years before, while Burnett was living in New York City. Burnett described the script as being dark and deeply personal, and he harbored "only the vaguest hopes of directing it." Shortly after the completion of the screenplay, a small production company offered to buy it and for David Burton Morris to direct it. Morris's 1988 film Patti Rocks is described as having been an influence on Burnett in the writing of Red Meat. However, another production company called Treehouse Films was also interested and already had financing in place for the project. They gave Burnett the added incentive of letting him direct the film himself. The film would be shot in Los Angeles.

== Release ==
The film was first shown at the Slamdance Film Festival in 1997. In May 1998, it screened at the Cannes Film Festival in France, and in November of that year it aired on the Sundance Channel on five occasions.

== Reception ==
In December 1998, Kevin Thomas of the Los Angeles Times called it "fat on dialogue" but "slim on insight into relationships." Thomas states, "much of the film is set in a restaurant where Chris encounters his friend Victor (James Frain), who suddenly disappeared some time ago. Once Victor sits down with Chris and Stefan they regale him with their interminable, dreary encounters with women, which are shown in flashback. Then Victor tells them what’s been going on with him, involving a radically different experience with a dying woman (Lara Flynn Boyle)." He further adds, "Red Meat is the kind of overly theatrical first film that threatens to talk itself to death with dialogue that is frequently too literary, and above all, betrays its maker’s fervent conviction that he has something profound to express about the human condition and is, by golly, going to hammer it home no matter what. Yet Burnett offers no fresh take on the horrors of the contemporary mating game, and invoking a sense of mortality to throw into perspective all the petty, rotten ways in which men can treat women is somehow less staggering in its impact than obviously intended."

In his March 2002 review of the DVD release, A.V. Club writer Nathan Rabin called it, "yet another darkly comic drama about men behaving badly and the weak-willed, masochistic women they hurt in the process." He further adds, "the director (a man, despite his first name) saves most of his venom for his two male antiheroes, but women don't fare a whole lot better: Each is either a ditsy, bubble-headed tramp or a prim, disapproving moralist. Burnett directs with a fair amount of visual style, but all the stylistic flair in the world wouldn't make Red Meat's ham-fisted voyage into the male psyche any less familiar or unpleasant."
