= Ask Me Anything (film) =

2014 American drama film

- Directed by: Allison Burnett
- Screenplay by: Allison Burnett
- Based on: Undiscovered Gyrl by Allison Burnett
- Produced by: Lauren Avinoam; Nicholas Emiliani; Lauren Hogarth
- Starring: Britt Robertson; Justin Long; Martin Sheen; Christian Slater; Robert Patrick; Max Carver
- Cinematography: Patrice Lucien Cochet
- Edited by: Adam Lichtenstein
- Music by: Jon Ehrlich
- Production companies: Decipher Entertainment; Presque Isle Films; Tait Productions
- Distributed by: Phase 4 Films
- Release dates: April 19, 2014 (NaFF); December 19, 2014 (United States)
- Running time: 100 minutes
- Country: United States
- Language: English
- Budget: $950,000
- Box office: $48,710

Ask Me Anything is a 2014 American drama film written and directed by Allison Burnett, based on his novel Undiscovered Gyrl. The film stars Britt Robertson, Justin Long, Martin Sheen, Christian Slater, Robert Patrick, and Max Carver.

Ask Me Anything had its world premiere at the Nashville Film Festival, before it was released on December 19, 2014, by Phase 4 Films theatrically and via video on demand and other online platforms. The film was released on DVD on March 3, 2015.

== Plot ==
Katie Kampenfelt is an 18-year-old girl, a funny, free-spirited, lost soul who decides to take a year off before attending college. Her guidance counselor suggests she chronicle her feelings and experiences in a diary or blog.

Katie keeps her anonymous blog, called 'Undiscovered Gyrl', regularly updated with mostly sexual adventures. Initially, it is primarily with a 30+ y.o. film guy with a girlfriend, Dan, and with her teenage boyfriend, Rory. She gets a well-paid job in a bookshop with Glen, but her mother makes her quit when her partner discovers through contact with the police that he is a registered sex offender.

Although aware of Dan's impending move, he goes without saying goodbye or arranging for them to stay in contact. Her one girlfriend, Jade, calls her up after being away in Greece, and they go dancing.

Katie gets a new job as a nanny for Paul, a Tufts alum who had interviewed her for admissions, to look after his newborn. It pays well and includes a car. His wife Margaret shows her everything, and by the end of the week, she meets Paul again as he has been away for work.

Five weeks after Dan moved, Katie contacts him with Jade's help. After they have full-on intercourse, he reveals he is engaged to Martine. Upset upon returning home, Katie finds Rory waiting for her with her mom and her partner Mark. He confronts her, demanding answers as he has been there for over an hour. When Katie tells Rory she is in love with the older Dan, his rage provokes Mark to throw him out.

On New Year's Eve, when Katie is told her mom is engaged, she calls Rory only to find out he is now with Jade. She finally calls to meet up with Joel, a guy who tutored her in high school, for dinner. He is also taking a sabbatical, but for his mental health.

Affie, Katie's father's partner, calls in hysterics in the middle of the night, as he has had a serious fall. Going to the hospital, they fear he will not recover. Sure enough, he dies. Distraught, Katie seeks out Dan and comes face-to-face with Martine, so flustered, she leaves quickly.

When Katie shows Joel a note which Paul gave her, he thinks it is an obvious come-on. From stories she tells him about the way a neighbor interacted with her when she was six, he says it is obvious she has been molested, so he convinces her to see a shrink.

Within a short time, Katie has sex for the last time with Dan, and the first time with 43 y.o. Paul. Joel leaves her an angry voicemail and Rory calls her a whore when she tells him she is pregnant. Her narrative begins to turn dark, particularly after the pregnancy. Joel has been hospitalized for trying to kill himself. Visiting her dad's after receiving some of his belongings from Affie, she bursts into uncontrollable sobs.

Katie tells Glenn, her former boss, some of her dark secrets. He tells her the truth about why he is in the sex offender registry. Glenn offers Katie a place to live and, if she chooses to keep it, to raise her baby as his own. When she gets home, she adds this to her blog, saying that moving out will be the beginning of her adult life, and the right time to stop blogging.

We learn that Katie's real name is Amy Grantham and that just minutes after that last blog post, she received a short phone call from a blocked number. Driving away a few minutes later, she was never seen again.

We briefly see the real versions of the people whom "Katie" had blogged about, many confirming that some – but not all – of her sexual escapades had truly happened. It is also revealed that other details had been fictionally improved in her blog, such as her best friend really being a homeless drug addict rather than the well-off "Jade" that "Katie" had blogged about, or that the baby's father, while still an older man, worked in a video store rather than being a film school professor.

The film ends with Amy’s mother, Carol Grantham, writing the truth on Amy’s blog and imploring thousands of readers for any knowledge as to where Amy might be.

== Cast ==
- Britt Robertson as Katie Kampenfelt/Amy Grantham
- Molly Hagan as Caroline Kampenfelt
- Andy Buckley as Mark Aubichon
- Robert Patrick as Doug Kampenfelt
- Zuleikha Robinson as Afreen
- Christian Slater as Paul Spooner
- Kimberly Williams-Paisley as Margaret Spooner
- Max Carver as Rory
- Justin Long as Dan Gallo
- Martin Sheen as Glenn Warburg
- Sharon Omi as Mrs. Matsua
- Gia Mantegna as Jade
- Max Hoffman as Joel Seidler
- Beatrice Rosen as Martine
- Cathryn de Prume as Carol Grantham
- Lorraine Toussaint as Dr. Sherman

== Reception ==
Gary Goldstein, of the Los Angeles Times, felt that it "begins with a snarky, bubble-gum vibe that gives way to something far deeper and more meaningful” that "all beautifully paid off in the movie's haunting coda." Mike Reyes of CinemaBlend felt that it failed "to even surpass TV-movie standards", and that it failed "to earn that twist and the fall out, which leaves this ending flapping in the wind".

Ask Me Anything premiered at the Nashville Film Festival where it received a Best Actress award for Britt Robertson as well as the award for Best Music in a Feature Film.

In December 2015, Ask Me Anything ranked number one on Taste of Cinema's 30 Underappreciated 21st Century American Movies Worth Your Time.

== Home media ==
The film was released to video on demand as well as other online platforms on December 19, 2014. The DVD was released on March 3, 2015.

== Soundtrack ==
Director Allison Burnett held a contest asking for undiscovered female singers, age 21 and under, to submit songs for the soundtrack. Approximately one hundred songs were submitted, with fourteen showing up on the official soundtrack released to iTunes and other online distributors.

== Sequel ==
A direct sequel, titled Another Girl, was released in 2021. The film focuses on a woman who read Katie’s book and reaches out to her wanting to know what happened, only to find out that there is an even bigger mystery around Katie’s disappearance. The film is also directed by the same director.
