= Class of 1999 =

1990 American science fiction film

- Theatrical release poster
- Directed by: Mark L. Lester
- Screenplay by: C. Courtney Joyner
- Story by: Mark L. Lester
- Produced by: Mark L. Lester
- Starring: Bradley Gregg; Traci Lind; John P. Ryan; Pam Grier; Joshua Miller; Stacy Keach; Malcolm McDowell
- Cinematography: Mark Irwin
- Edited by: Scott Conrad
- Music by: Michael Hoenig
- Production companies: Lightning Pictures; Original Pictures
- Distributed by: Taurus Entertainment Company
- Release date: May 11, 1990
- Running time: 99 minutes
- Country: United States
- Language: English
- Budget: $5.2-7 million
- Box office: $2.4 million

Class of 1999 is a 1990 American science-fiction action thriller film directed and produced by Mark L. Lester, and starring Bradley Gregg, Traci Lind, John P. Ryan, Pam Grier, Joshua John Miller, Stacy Keach and Malcolm McDowell. It is the director's follow-up to his 1982 film Class of 1984, though it is not a direct sequel, other than the general theme of juvenile delinquency. Set in a near-future Seattle where delinquency runs rampant, the film is about three ex-military humanoid robots which are reprogrammed as school teachers.

The film was released by Taurus Entertainment Company on May 11, 1990. It received mixed reviews and was a financial disappointment, but has developed a cult following. A direct-to-video sequel, Class of 1999 II: The Substitute, followed in 1994.

== Plot ==
In the 1990s, youth gangs take over areas in major North American cities. Two major gangs, the Blackhearts and the Razorheads, vie for control. In 1999, while working with MegaTech head Dr. Bob Forrest, the CIA begins an experiment where three former military robots become educators in Seattle's Kennedy High School: school coach Mr. Bryles, history teacher Mr. Hardin, and chemistry teacher Ms. Connors. Former delinquents who were imprisoned are released as part of the experiment. One of them is former Blackheart Cody Culp. On the first day of class, the three teachers violently subdue the students when conflict starts brewing. Returning home, Cody finds that his brothers and his mother are addicted to a drug known as "edge".

The next day, Razorhead Flavio attempts to rape Christie, Langford's daughter. Cody fights off Flavio and Razorhead leader Hector. Bryles eventually subdues Cody, who violated his parole with the fight. However, Langford lets him off due to the fact that he did save Christie. When physical education class is over, Bryles tells Cody to stay behind and starts beating him. They are interrupted by armed Blackheart Mohawk, who was humiliated by Bryles and has taken some "edge". Bryles grabs the gun and breaks Mohawk's neck, killing him.

Cody's brother Sonny later shows up late to Hardin's class, high on "edge". Hardin takes him to his locker and breaks it to reveal vials of "edge". He then forces the vials into Sonny's mouth while beating him. Sonny dies, and Hardin takes the latter's cross. Cody sees the cross as Hardin gives his lecture. Aided by Langford, the crime becomes a cover-up to say that Sonny died of a drug overdose. The next day, Cody and Christie skip school to look for evidence. They find the cross before the robots catch the duo, who escape. The robots later decide to start a war between Razorheads and Blackhearts.

That evening, the robots kill Cody's Blackheart brother Angel. Connors then kidnaps Razorhead Noser. Noser is eventually sent through the window of the Razorheads' hangout while on fire. Convinced that the Blackhearts did it, Hector decides to start a war. The next morning, Cody finds a dead Angel at the Blackheart hangout. Furious, Cody rejoins the Blackhearts. That afternoon, a war ensues between the gangs. During it, the robots secretly kill Blackhearts and Razorheads. Cody eventually shoots at Hardin, discovering that he is not human. After getting wind of the situation, Langford decides to have the program terminated, but Forrest and Bryles kill him.

Hector receives a call apparently from Cody saying that he wants him one-on-one at the school entrance. Connors, kidnapping Christie, pretends to be Hector and calls Cody with the same proposition. The Blackhearts are eventually convinced that the teachers are responsible. Hector and Cody later show up with both gangs. To prove that the teachers have started the war, Cody shows Hector Sonny's bloody cross. The Blackhearts and Razorheads decide to team up and take on the teachers. In the ensuing battle, Cody finds Christie. Hardin eventually attempts to kill Cody, who reaches for a machine gun and shoots him through the mouth, destroying him.

Connors then chases Cody and Christie to the chemistry lab. Cody instructs Christie to turn on all of the gas there. After throwing an axe at Connors, Cody and Christie run out of the lab. Connors, unleashing a flamethrower, explodes when fire hits the gas. Hector meets up with Cody and Christie. They are the three only survivors. Hector distracts Bryles while Christie and Cody reach a bus, which the latter hotwires. Cody eventually runs down Bryles while leaping out of the bus with Christie. The bus explodes seemingly destroying Bryles.

Hector, Cody, and Christie find Forrest. However, Forrest takes Christie hostage, planning to continue the project. Hector attempts to kill Forrest, who shoots him dead. Forrest then attempts to kill Cody. However, a heavily damaged Bryles then appears and rips Forrest's heart out, killing him. Cody eventually finds a forklift and impales Bryles. Christie grabs the nearest chain and puts it around Bryles' neck with Cody using the forklift to lift the chain, cutting the robot's head. Cody and Christie, the only two survivors, then walk out of the school.

== Cast ==
- Bradley Gregg as Cody Culp
- Traci Lind as Christie Langford
- John P. Ryan as Mr. Hardin
- Pam Grier as Miss Connors
- Patrick Kilpatrick as Mr. Bryles
- Stacy Keach as Dr. Robert "Bob" Forrest
- Malcolm McDowell as Dr. Miles Langford
- Joshua John Miller as Angel Culp
- Darren E. Burrows as Sonny Culp
- Sharon Wyatt as Janice Culp
- James Medina as Hector
- Jason Oliver as Curt
- Brent David Fraser as Flavio
- Lee Arenberg as Technician
- Rose McGowan as Female student (uncredited)

== Production ==
The film was originally called Obedience.

The film was shot in 1988, at Lincoln High School in Seattle's Wallingford neighborhood. In the introduction of the film, the exterior of the school is clearly visible as a heavily secured area with two guard towers on top of the stairs leading to the entrance. The film's robotic effects were designed by Eric Allard.

== Release ==
=== Theatrical ===
The film was originally scheduled to be released by Vestron Pictures through their subsidiary Lightning Pictures on October 6, 1989, but Vestron's financial turmoil resulted in the film being sold to Taurus Entertainment Group in March 1990. Taurus eventually released the film theatrically on May 11, 1990.

=== Home media ===
Class of 1999 was initially released on VHS via Vestron Video in 1991, and was later withdrawn. It was released on DVD in other countries such as South Korea and Australia. In 2001, a widescreen DVD edition of the movie was released through Columbia Tristar Home Entertainment in the U.K. The film's first American DVD release was by Lionsgate, on September 16, 2008. In 2012, Lionsgate included Class of 1999 in a DVD box set with seven other horror movies. The magazine Fangoria released the film under their banner on Hulu in March 2015. Lionsgate released the movie on Blu-ray in January 2018, as part of its new Vestron Video Collector's Series.

== Soundtrack ==
Nine Inch Nails' "Head Like A Hole" is featured on the soundtrack.

Midge Ure's "Come The Day" is used under the closing credits of the film. Ure recorded the track while on tour in the United States in 1989. He would later say that he disliked the song, as well as the film.

== Reception ==
=== Critical response ===
The film received a score of 57% based on seven reviews on Rotten Tomatoes. Metacritic gave the film a score of 33 based on 9 reviews, indicating "generally unfavorable" reviews.

=== Awards and nominations ===
Joshua John Miller was nominated for a Young Artist Award for his performance in the film.

== Sequel ==
A sequel, titled Class of 1999 II: The Substitute, was released direct-to-video in 1994 by CineTel Films. The plots of the three films in the series (the first being Class of 1984) are only loosely related to each other.
