= Corey Mylchreest =

English actor (born 1998)

- Mylchreest in 2025
- Born: 8 May 1998 (age 28); Leytonstone, London, England
- Education: Royal Academy of Dramatic Art
- Occupation: Actor
- Years active: 2020–present

Corey Mylchreest (born 8 May 1998) is an English actor. A graduate of the Royal Academy of Dramatic Art, he is known for his starring role as a fictionalised King George III in the Netflix period drama miniseries Queen Charlotte: A Bridgerton Story (2023). In 2025, he starred in the film My Oxford Year and thriller series Hostage.

== Early life and education ==
Corey Mylchreest was born on 8 May 1998 in Whipps Cross University Hospital and grew up in Leytonstone, east London. His father is an NHS psychiatric nurse from Liverpool, while his mother, a violist, is from Yorkshire. He attended Forest School, Walthamstow, and joined the National Youth Theatre. He graduated with a Bachelor of Arts in Acting from the Royal Academy of Dramatic Art (RADA) in 2020.

== Career ==
Upon graduating from RADA, Mylchreest was cast in open-air productions of the Shakespeare plays Romeo & Juliet and A Midsummer Night's Dream directed by Abbey Wood. In 2022 he made his television debut in the premiere episode of the Netflix adaptation of Neil Gaiman's The Sandman.

Also in 2022 it was announced Mylchreest would star as a young, fictionalised version of King George III in the period drama prequel miniseries Queen Charlotte: A Bridgerton Story, which was released on Netflix in May 2023. Karama Horne of TheWrap was appreciative of the chemistry between Mylchreest and India Amarteifio (who played the title role of Queen Charlotte) and added that he "does a beautiful job wandering through the wilderness of King George’s mind without being campy".

In June 2023 Mylchreest signed with WME for representation. He made his West End debut as Edmund in Kenneth Branagh's production of King Lear at Wyndham's Theatre. He has appeared in the second installment of the Phelps twins' travel show Fantastic Friends. He had a role in the Netflix political thriller Hostage. In 2025, Mylchreest starred as a supporting lead in My Oxford Year with Sofia Carson.

In November 2025, it was announced that Mylchreest will star in the thriller film Banquet, directed by Galder Gaztelu-Urrutia, alongside Meghann Fahy, Alfie Williams, and Finbar Lynch, and will be produced by David Yates.

== Filmography ==
Key
| † | Denotes films that have not yet been released |

| Year | Title | Role | Notes |
|---|---|---|---|
| 2020 | The Unravelling | Henry | Short film |
| 2021 | Mars | Leon | Short film |
| 2022 | The Sandman | Adonis | Episode: "Sleep of the Just" |
| 2023 | Queen Charlotte: A Bridgerton Story | Young George III | Miniseries |
| 2025 | My Oxford Year | Jamie Davenport | Film |
| 2025 | Hostage | Matheo Lewis | Miniseries |
| 2025 | Daddy Issues | Rocky | Episode: "We Don't Like Sigmas" |
| 2026 | Agatha Christie's Seven Dials | Gerry Wade | Miniseries |
| 2026 | True Love and Wormholes | Craig | Short film |
| TBA | Banquet † | TBA | Film |
| TBA | The Travel Writer † | TBA | Film |
| TBA | A Night in Porto † | TBA | Film |
| TBA | Laird † | TBA | Series |

| Year | Title | Role | Notes |
|---|---|---|---|
| 2020 | Romeo & Juliet | Tybalt | New Forest Open Air Theatre, Hampshire |
| 2020 | A Midsummer Night's Dream | Demetrius | New Forest Open Air Theatre, Hampshire |
| 2023 | King Lear | Edmund | Wyndham's Theatre, London |
