= Quantico season 3 =

Quantico
- Season 3
- Starring: Priyanka Chopra; Jake McLaughlin; Johanna Braddy; Russell Tovey; Blair Underwood; Marlee Matlin; Alan Powell
- No. of episodes: 13

Release
- Original network: ABC
- Original release: April 26 – August 3, 2018

Season chronology
- ← Previous; Season 2

The third and final season of American drama thriller series Quantico premiered in the United States on American Broadcasting Company (ABC) on April 26, 2018, and concluded on August 3, 2018. Produced by ABC Studios, Michael Seitzman served as the showrunner for the third and final season, subsequently replacing series creator Joshua Safran. Executive producers include Mark Gordon, Robert Sertner, Nicholas Pepper, and Jorge Zamacona.

The third and final season consisted of thirteen episodes, down from the twenty-two episode count of the two previous seasons. The season aired on Thursdays in the United States at 10:00 pm. On May 11, 2018, after only three of the thirteen episodes in the season had aired, ABC announced that the series had canceled. On May 14, Deadline reported that the network would finish airing the remainder of the third season on Friday nights at 8:00 pm.

== Overview ==
Three years after the events of the Constitutional Convention, former CIA analyst, Alex Parrish had to escape outside the United States in order to avoid arrest from law enforcement authorities. After living anonymously in Italy, she is forced to return to America after Ryan shared information to her about Shelby's kidnapping by a notorious international arms dealer known as The Widow. In order to save Shelby, Ryan and Alex recruit Owen and Harry to help them with their mission. Owen invites Jocelyn Turner to the team as the former FBI agent has intelligence about the arms dealer, due in part to their past history. Owing to the extreme circumstances of the covert operation, the team must retrieve Shelby at all costs, before time runs out.

== Episodes ==
| No. overall | No. in season | Title | Directed by | Written by | Original release date | US viewers (millions) |
|---|---|---|---|---|---|---|
| 45 | 1 | "The Conscience Code" | Russell Lee Fine | Michael Seitzman | April 26, 2018 | 2.66 |
For three years, Alex (Priyanka Chopra) has a peaceful, anonymous life in Italy with Andrea (Andrea Bosca) and his daughter Isabella. However, Alex must abandon this idyllic existence when she is found and her new family is in danger. When she goes to find her escape documents, Ryan (Jake McLaughlin) finds her and persuades her to help him rescue Shelby (Johanna Braddy), who is now his wife, from an international arms dealer, The Widow (Jayne Houdyshell), by giving her the conscience code. They get the team together for the rescue - Owen (Blair Underwood), Harry (Russell Tovey), Jocelyn (Marlee Matlin), and new trainees, Jagdeep (Vandit Bhatt) and Celine (Amber Skye Noyes).
| 46 | 2 | "Fear and Flesh" | Alexandra Kalymnios | Dave Kalstein | May 3, 2018 | 2.15 |
In tracking down the origin of a deadly strain of tuberculosis threatening Americans, Ryan must go undercover and infiltrate a white supremacist organization. He works with an under cover operative, Mike McQuigg (Alan Powell), who then becomes part of the black ops team. Alex, Deep, and Harry find one of the survivors of the strain, a young girl, and harvest her blood to create a vaccine. Under attack from the terrorists, they get infected themselves, but are saved by the vaccine. Ryan kisses Alex and she is not happy. Harry catches them and asks Ryan to come clean to Shelby.
| 47 | 3 | "Hell's Gate" | Constantine Makris | Tom Mularz | May 10, 2018 | 1.97 |
The team must protect an ex-CIA Agent, Charlie (David Zayas), as he prepares to testify against a cartel kingpin. They are found and attacked several times and the team manages to save Charlie while trying to find the mole in their organization. Finally, Charlie is taken to the court and reveals that the defendant killed his lover before he shoots him. Charlie is arrested. The mole is found to be Joel Akers, the US Marshall.
| 48 | 4 | "Spy Games" | Kevin Sullivan | Julia Cohen | May 25, 2018 | 2.62 |
Alex and McQuigg are tasked with protecting an Arabian Emir after Harry is warned by an old foe, Dimitri (a Russian spy). During a shootout, it is revealed that the target is actually his son. Ryan and Harry work to uncover the assassin. They suspect either the Russian government or the Emir's brother, but it turns out to be the sister, who wanted to kill her brother and take over the throne.
| 49 | 5 | "The Blood of Romeo" | David McWhirter | Adam Armus | June 1, 2018 | 2.99 |
When a physics professor at a major U.S. university steals weaponized uranium, the team scrambles to find the professor and the missing uranium before it can be used against an important international summit meeting in New York City.
| 50 | 6 | "The Heavens Fall" | Russell Lee Fine | Michael Brandon Guercio | June 15, 2018 | 2.56 |
Leon Riggs, a suspect in custody, claims to work for Dante Warwick (an old associate of The Widow) and provides the location of seven bodies, all beaten to death. He also says Frank Marlow, Jocelyn's handler from her undercover days, was taken by Dante. A bomb cost Jocelyn her hearing and Frank, who was in love with her, lost his perspective about the case and became obsessed with Dante. Mike, Alex, and Celine go undercover to find Dante in an underground Casino and the girls get kidnapped. Jocelyn is tricked and taken, too. Forced into a blindfolded knife fight against each other, Jocelyn kills Celine. Alex and Jocelyn then find Frank and rescue him with the help of the others.
| 51 | 7 | "Bullet Train" | Rob Bowman | Tom Mularz & Gideon Yago | June 22, 2018 | 2.41 |
The team must protect a group of scientists who have developed a deadly technology that, in the wrong hands, could have devastating consequences on mankind. When one of the scientists, Jurgen, has a change of heart about the project, he gives the scoop to a journalist before he is murdered. The team takes the weapon and the scientists away from their lab and into a bullet train to get away, as air evacuation is not possible due to a storm. Jocelyn and Owen are helping them offsite using the Satellite. One scientist, Leslie, makes a rash move when they are attacked in the train, but it is finally resolved by Alex. Deep leaves the team, not able to cope with Celine's death. Ryan finds a pregnancy test and thinks it is Shelby's, but then they discover that it belongs to Alex.
| 52 | 8 | "Deep Cover" | Jim McKay | Cole Maliska & Joe Webb | June 29, 2018 | 2.71 |
Alex goes undercover with a military contractor, First Pledge, who is believed to have struck a deadly deal with another country. She gets close to David Quintana, an intelligence agent, using AA meetings. Mike and Ryan go undercover in a prison to set up leverage to be used against Alex by David and his boss, Garrett King. She is asked to commit treason by getting security details about Jun-Ho Park, a North Korean defector, and then to assassinate him using money and blackmail. The team plans and executes a fake assassination. When Alex tries to coax a confession from King, her cover is blown and he tries to kill her and escapes. Alex has a hard time dealing with her pregnancy and her future but, in the line of duty, she is injured and loses her baby.
| 53 | 9 | "Fear Feargach" | P. J. Pesce | Dave Kalstein & Matthew Klam | July 6, 2018 | 2.76 |
Three of the four Syrian nationals who are about to testify at the U.N. are killed at a CIA safe house. The escaped Syrian, Nazir, is a friend of Shelby's from a past CIA assignment. Alex and Shelby are attacked as Shelby plans to testify, but they survive. Shelby brings in Nazir so the team can protect him. It is revealed that Nazir and Shelby have a romantic past and that he was her asset. Due to a mistake on her part, his entire family was killed. The IRA is behind the attacks, led by Conor Devlin and his son Phelan. They were once associates of Garrett King. Shelby feels guilty, Nazir wants revenge, and Ryan is a bit jealous. Frank is pulled in, as he was 13 months undercover with the IRA. Frank plants info on which the Devlins act and Phelan is killed. Nazir is killed in a car bomb set up by Conor and his men. Conor is arrested but vows to come for Alex and her loved ones. Shelby testifies on Nazir's behalf.
| 54 | 10 | "No Place Is Home" | Kenneth Fink | Gisselle Legere & Julia Cohen | July 13, 2018 | 2.68 |
Owen gets news that Lydia has been killed in prison and Mike learns that his sister was also killed. The team discovers that their families are in danger and gathers them all together at Shelby's remote farmhouse - Ryan's father, Alex's mother, and Harry's sister. When a stranger enters the house claiming to be Shelby's old friend, Ryan is suspicious. Harry, Owen, and Jocelyn investigate the house of the possible assassin Maya and get trapped on a pressure plate bomb. Shelby's "friend" and Maya attack the housemates and both are finally killed. Harry defuses the bomb and all are saved. Owen and Jocelyn share a kiss.
| 55 | 11 | "The Art of War" | Jennifer Phang | Adam Armus & Tom Mularz | July 20, 2018 | 2.64 |
Harry's sister is attacked at her house and taken by King. The government of Ireland tries to get Conor extradited. King holds a lawyer's wife hostage to force him to defend Conor. He then asks Conor for the money he paid him to kill the Syrians and stop the testimony. Conor tries to make a deal with Owen to get extradited in exchange for King's location. Based on a tip, Alex, Mike, and Shelby find a truck full of kidnapped girls and investigate. Harry believes this will lead to his sister. Owen asks Deep to return. Owen and Jocelyn are attacked in the loft and Owen is shot. Deep saves his life. The team takes the deal; Conor leads them to a ship with human cargo and King. King was killed while struggling with Alex for her gun. The human trafficking turns out to be Devlin's business; Maisie (Harry's sister) is still not found, but several other girls are rescued. Devlin is extradited.
| 56 | 12 | "Ghosts" | Russell Lee Fine | Julia Cohen & Matthew Klam | July 27, 2018 | 2.66 |
The team takes Conor to Ireland. The plane is purposefully crashed by Conor Devlin's man, which results in Conor fleeing and the team parachuting out of the plane. The team sets out to rescue Maisie with the help of Fiona from MI-5. The rescue is successful with a few hiccups, as Fiona was working for Conor. Alex kills Fiona and, in the meantime, Conor kills his brother Eamon to take over the family inheritance and later escapes. Conor Devlin continues to seek revenge as someone from Alex's past comes back into her life.
| 57 | 13 | "Who Are You?" | Russell Lee Fine | Dave Kalstein & Michael Seitzman | August 3, 2018 | 2.66 |
Alex and the team stake out Eamon's funeral, expecting the police to arrest Devlin on sight. Instead, the police let him walk straight inside and deliver a eulogy, where he promises to forgive past grievances and give up vendettas. The team realizes that one of Devlin's men, Bobby, was more loyal to Eamon, so they take him. He gives up Andrea and Isabella's location. When the team gets there, they manage to save Andrea, but Devlin grabs Isabella. Devlin reiterates the terms: give him Ryan Booth and he will release Isabella. The plan is to kill Devlin and grab Isabella, but things don't work out that way. Devlin kills Andrea when he runs to plead for his daughter's life. Ryan surrenders to Devlin and Isabella is freed. Devlin beats Ryan unconscious, but Ryan manages to clue the team into where he's being held first. When everyone arrives, Devlin is gone and Ryan barely has a pulse. In the end, the team manages to catch up with Devlin. Instead of bringing him to justice, they let Bobby murder him. Jocelyn and Owen kiss, suggesting that they will start dating. Alex asks Isabella if she wants to come back to America with her.

== Cast ==
=== Main ===
- Priyanka Chopra as Alex Parrish
- Jake McLaughlin as Ryan Booth
- Johanna Braddy as Shelby Wyatt of Booth
- Russell Tovey as Harry Doyle
- Blair Underwood as Owen Hall
- Marlee Matlin as Jocelyn Turner
- Alan Powell as Mike McQuigg

=== Recurring ===
- Amber Skye Noyes as Celine Fox
- Vandit Bhatt as Jagdeep Patel
- Timothy V. Murphy as Conor Devlin
- Laura Campbell as Fiona Quinn
- Lilly Englert as Maisie Doyle
- Andrea Bosca as Andrea
- Emma Gia Celotto Signirini as Isabella

=== Guest ===
- Jay Armstrong Johnson as Will Olsen
- Jayne Houdyshell as The Widow
- Nathan Darrow as Felix Pillay
- Jamie Jackson as Gavin Pillay
- Ana Khaja as Sita Parrish
- Erik Jensen as Damon Grosch
- Chris McKinney as Larry Reese
- Frances Turner as Chelsea Lee
- Peter Rini as Joel Akers
- Omar Maskati as Khaled
- Alexander Sokovikov as Dmitri Ivanov
- Piter Marek as Ali
- Lara Wolf as Nora
- Chuk Iwuji as Dante
- Donald Paul as Leon Riggs
- Brayson Peter Isaya as Bray Bill Broonzy

== Production ==
=== Development ===
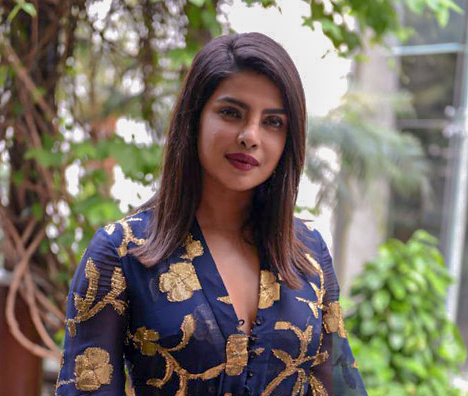
Priyanka Chopra portrays the series' protagonist, Alex Parrish.

In May 2017, ABC renewed the series for a third season of 13 episodes. As part of the renewal process, Safran stepped down as showrunner of the show but remained as a consultant. The following month, it was announced that Michael Seitzman would be Quantico's showrunner and Safran would be credited as an executive producer. The third season premiered on April 26, 2018.

=== Casting ===
After the third season renewal announcement, it was reported that Yasmine Al Massri and Pearl Thusi would leave the series, and in June 2017, it was reported that Ellis and Tovey would not return as part of a creative overhaul. However, in August 2017, it was confirmed that Tovey would in fact be returning as a series regular. In late July 2017, Marlee Matlin joined the show as a series regular in the third season. She will play the role of ex-FBI agent, Jocelyn Turner. On November 21, 2017, it was announced that Alan Powell will join the show as a series regular in the third season. He will play Mike McQuigg, an undercover agent. On December 6, 2017, it was announced that Amber Skye Noyes will join the third season in the recurring role of Celine Fox. On January 17, 2018, it was announced that Vandit Bhatt will join the third season in the recurring role of Jagdeep Patel. On February 16, 2018, it was confirmed that Aunjanue Ellis has exited the series.

=== Filming ===
Certain scenes of the third-season premiere were shot on location in Italy. Filming for the third season started on October 10, 2017. In March 2018, it was confirmed by showrunner Michael Seitzman that the last few episodes of the third season would be shot on location in Ireland. Filming for the third season ended on April 21, 2018.

== Reception ==
=== Critical response ===
The third season received mixed feedback from critics, who were divided over its direction in comparison to its predecessors. The season premiere was poorly received. Despite praising the episode's action and pacing and its introduction of Marlee Matlin's character, Dishya Sharma of the International Business Times wrote that "it leaves you asking for more". The Quint's Dipti Kharude said that "the briskness of the episode suffocates it". Mark Perigard of the Boston Herald was critical of the season's new format and storylines, writing that it "doubles down on the dumb". During a review of the series finale, TV Fanatic's Allison Nichols praised how the season "show[ed] the team putting the pieces together", but cited the relationship between Ryan and Shelby as unbelievable and "one of the more controversial parts".

=== Hindu terrorist plot ===
The fifth episode of the season, titled "The Blood of Romeo", was criticized by some Indian social media users for its alleged anti-Indian sentiment. In the episode, Alex Parrish (Priyanka Chopra) uncovers a plot by Indian Hindu nationalists to commit a terrorist false flag attack with nuclear weapons in Manhattan, and have it blamed on Pakistan. Users had described the plotline as "ridiculous" and "unrealistic" and felt that it had damaged the image of Indians abroad. In addition, they denounced Chopra's participation in the episode as her international profile had made her a "quasi-ambassador for India in the West". Chopra apologised for any hurt caused by the episode and stated that she was a "proud Indian". ABC also apologised and defended Chopra from what they felt was unfairly aimed criticism commenting that she did not have a role in writing, directing or creating the show.

Indian-born British chef Atul Kochhar's contract at the Rang Mahal restaurant in Dubai was terminated by JW Marriott Marquis Dubai after he made comments criticising Chopra's involvement in the episode, which included allegations that Hindus had been terrorized by Islam for thousands of years. Bangladeshi-American writer Sharbari Zohra Ahmed who had previously worked on Quantico but was not involved in the writing of the episode was also targeted on social media. These attacks included threats of violence, including rape.

=== Ratings ===
Viewership and ratings per episode of Quantico season 3
| No. | Title | Air date | Rating/share (18–49) | Viewers (millions) | DVR (18–49) | DVR viewers (millions) | Total (18–49) | Total viewers (millions) |
|---|---|---|---|---|---|---|---|---|
| 1 | "The Conscience Code" | April 26, 2018 | 0.5/2 | 2.66 | 0.4 | 1.48 | 0.9 | 4.15 |
| 2 | "Fear and Flesh" | May 3, 2018 | 0.5/2 | 2.15 | 0.4 | 1.39 | 0.9 | 3.53 |
| 3 | "Hell's Gate" | May 10, 2018 | 0.5/2 | 1.97 | 0.4 | 1.24 | 0.8 | 3.21 |
| 4 | "Spy Games" | May 25, 2018 | 0.4/2 | 2.62 | 0.3 | 1.06 | 0.7 | 3.71 |
| 5 | "The Blood of Romeo" | June 1, 2018 | 0.5/3 | 2.99 | 0.3 | 1.05 | 0.8 | 4.04 |
| 6 | "The Heavens Fall" | June 15, 2018 | 0.4/2 | 2.56 | 0.3 | 1.13 | 0.7 | 3.74 |
| 7 | "Bullet Train" | June 22, 2018 | 0.4/2 | 2.41 | 0.3 | 0.97 | 0.7 | 3.36 |
| 8 | "Deep Cover" | June 29, 2018 | 0.4/2 | 2.71 | 0.3 | 1.02 | 0.7 | 3.73 |
| 9 | "Fear Feargach" | July 6, 2018 | 0.5/2 | 2.76 | 0.3 | 1.07 | 0.8 | 3.83 |
| 10 | "No Place Is Home" | July 13, 2018 | 0.4/2 | 2.68 | 0.3 | 0.93 | 0.7 | 3.60 |
| 11 | "The Art of War" | July 20, 2018 | 0.4/2 | 2.64 | 0.3 | 0.98 | 0.7 | 3.62 |
| 12 | "Ghosts" | July 27, 2018 | 0.4/2 | 2.66 | 0.3 | 0.87 | 0.7 | 3.53 |
| 13 | "Who Are You?" | August 3, 2018 | 0.4/2 | 2.66 | 0.3 | 0.95 | 0.7 | 3.61 |
