= Quantico season 2 =

Quantico
- Season 2
- Starring: Priyanka Chopra; Jake McLaughlin; Aunjanue Ellis; Yasmine Al Massri; Johanna Braddy; Russell Tovey; Pearl Thusi; Blair Underwood
- No. of episodes: 22

Release
- Original network: ABC
- Original release: September 25, 2016 – May 15, 2017

Season chronology
- ← Previous; Season 1 Next → Season 3

The second season of American drama thriller series Quantico premiered in the United States on American Broadcasting Company (ABC) on September 25, 2016, and concluded on May 15, 2017. The season was produced by ABC Studios, with series creator Joshua Safran, Mark Gordon, Robert Sertner, Nicholas Pepper and Jorge Zamacona serving as executive producers.

Season two consists of twenty-two episodes; it follows Alex Parrish (Priyanka Chopra), who has been working undercover for the FBI as a CIA recruit to uncover a rogue faction called the AIC. The narrative is told through dual timelines until the thirteenth episode; it switches between the present—where Parrish must confront a terrorist-instigated hostage crisis at the G-20 summit in New York City—and the past, where she is training at the CIA's mysterious training facility "The Farm" with other trainees, revealing links between the two incidents. The narrative switches to a single timeline from the fourteenth episode.

The season aired on Sundays in the United States at 10:00 pm, before moving to Mondays at 10:00 pm after its mid-season break. The second season was well received by television critics but struggled with the ratings, averaging 4.53 million viewers. For portraying Alex Parrish, Chopra won the 2017's People's Choice Award for Favorite Dramatic TV Actress.

== Overview ==
As season two begins, Alex Parrish and Ryan Booth are working undercover for the FBI at "The Farm" as CIA recruits. Their mission is to uncover the mastermind behind the rogue faction of the CIA called the AIC. In the future, the President of the United States, the First Lady and several other world leaders are being held hostage at the G-20 summit in New York City by a group of terrorists called the Citizens Liberation Front.

The group's real agenda is to get the surveillance drives from the world leaders before the AIC, who are hiding among the hostages. Two weeks after the hostage crisis ends, President Claire Haas and CIA director Matthew Keyes put forth a covert joint FBI-CIA task force to expose a syndicate of eight collaborators who were secretly involved in orchestrating the hostage crisis. After the collaborators gain access to the sensitive intelligence, Alex is reinstated as an FBI agent and is hired as a member of the task force along with Ryan Booth, Nimah Amin, Shelby Wyatt and Dayana Mampasi, and the leader of the group, Clay Haas, a renowned political advisory strategist.

As the season progresses, Henry Roarke, the Speaker of the House, is appointed as the president of the United States, replacing Claire after a national scandal. Shortly after his inauguration, he requests for a new Constitutional Convention to rewrite the United States Constitution. In the days before it is due, the task force tries to stop Roarke from getting the votes needed to allow the convention to occur in Philadelphia. Alex resorts to a final strategy: she publicly broadcasts Roarke's recordings with the Federal Security Service and emails the evidence to the ACLU and other rights organizations. Due to Alex committing treason by releasing classified U.S. intelligence to the public at the Constitutional Convention, she is branded as a fugitive and an Interpol Red Notice for her arrest is issued. With Ryan, Alex leaves the U.S. on an aircraft to an unknown destination.

== Episodes ==
| No. overall | No. in season | Title | Directed by | Written by | Original release date | US viewers (millions) |
|---|---|---|---|---|---|---|
| 23 | 1 | "Kudove" | Patrick Norris | Joshua Safran & Logan Slakter | September 25, 2016 | 3.64 |
While walking in New York City, Alex becomes suspicious of mysterious behavior of white vans. She calls Shelby to examine a photograph of a person she believes she killed months earlier. The white vans drive in formation and blow up intersections, blocking off the Financial District of Lower Manhattan and isolating those inside. Ryan and Raina are at Federal Hall National Memorial for the G-20 summit, which is a target for a terrorist group calling itself "Citizen's Liberation Front" (CLF). Alex infiltrates the building to find out who is behind the terrorist attack. After giving into the terrorists' wishes, the hostages are split up and the First Lady of the United States is beheaded. In flashbacks, Alex has started working at the CIA; she is working for the FBI to see whether a CIA operative is really a homegrown terrorist. She is taken to a CIA training camp called The Farm, where she finds out Ryan has also been recruited by the FBI and the CIA to spy on the Farm. During the first training exercise, Alex tries to be a hero but her actions backfire in the CIA world where the mission always comes first.
| 24 | 2 | "Lipstick" | Patrick Norris | Cami Delavigne | October 2, 2016 | 3.57 |
In their second week at the Farm, the CIA trainees are learning to avoid surveillance. Ryan is secretly followed by the Farm's lead instructor, Owen. Alex, as a target, only partially completes the assignment, having failed to identify her lead surveillor. Despite this, Owen and his subordinate Lydia commend Ryan and Alex for their work. In the present timeline, after noticing that CLF's personnel have been switching places with some of the hostages, Raina tries to identify one of them by injuring the masked individual's wrist while her group of hostages is being cycled out. As they cycle the hostages back in, CLF responds by giving everyone—including Raina—the same cut. Meanwhile, Alex, with the help of the police officer she met earlier, finds an NYPD emergency bunker under Federal Hall National Memorial before he sacrifices himself. Alex successfully calls Miranda, who then texts one of CLF's personnel, revealing that Alex is inside.
| 25 | 3 | "Stescalade" | Jennifer Lynch | Beth Schacter | October 16, 2016 | 3.04 |
After Raina's plan backfires, Ryan tries to do the same thing by creating a diversion involving Harry Doyle, his ex-classmate at the Farm. This plan also fails, compromising Alex and Ryan. Ryan is taken away by the terrorists. Alex fight and kills one of the terrorists and drops the body into the building, leaving a message for the terrorists. Meanwhile, Miranda, still in contact with the terrorists, suspects the group Alex and Ryan investigated at the Farm—dubbed the "AIC", may be behind the attack. In flashbacks to the Farm, the CIA trainees begin their assessment training in a nearby forest, but they fail even after returning to base. Alex and Ryan cooperate with their respective handlers, Shelby and Nimah, to plant a bug in one of their classmates' rooms. The bug records only interference because someone else, who might know their plan, has already planted another bug. Later, Harry, in an effort to learn more about Alex, disguises himself to meet Will Olsen, one of Alex's FBI colleagues.
| 26 | 4 | "Kubark" | Steve Robin | Jordon Nardino | October 23, 2016 | 2.79 |
CLF offers to trade 1,700 hostages in exchange for the hacker pardoned in the series premiere. Alex tries to persuade Raina to give Miranda a message. Shelby tries to tell the FBI not to accept the exchange, but they go ahead with it on Miranda's orders. Raina tries to give Miranda Alex's message and Alex tries to stop the exchange, but both are unsuccessful. Shelby finds a message from the hacker that says Miranda is "one of them". The hacker, unwilling to follow CLF's orders, kills himself. In flashbacks, the trainees must learn to deal with stress and reduce their heart rates when dealing with their weaknesses. Alex and Ryan decide to clone Owen's phone, which is recording the trainees' stress levels. Alex's weakness is self-doubt and the CIA thinks Ryan's weakness is authority. Ryan tells Alex she is his weakness. The data cloned from Owen's phone shows Leigh had high stress levels when Ryan asked her about using a bug, suggesting Leigh planted it.
| 27 | 5 | "Kmforget" | Jennifer Lynch | Cameron Litvack | October 30, 2016 | 2.43 |
Alex escapes from the terrorists and later finds Lydia, who has also escaped. Miranda learns of the hacker's death and orders Shelby to find Will—who can hack computers—to investigate the terrorists' plans. Shelby still distrusts Miranda and warns Will about her, but Will persuades Shelby of Miranda's innocence. Will calls Miranda to reveal his knowledge of her secrets. In flashbacks to the Farm, the trainees learn to escape unnoticed. Alex and Ryan succeed and frame Harry. Harry returns, revealing he is an MI6 spy who bugged Alex's and Ryan's rooms. Owen blackmails the journalist who published his name. Shelby and another CIA trainee, León, meet by chance.
| 28 | 6 | "Aquiline" | Hanelle Culpepper | Jorge Zamacona | November 6, 2016 | 2.20 |
Lydia tells Alex the CLF is seeking some hard drives containing valuable information, but needs a hacker to decrypt them. Alex and Lydia find the drives; Alex thinks they should be destroyed but Lydia knocks her out, leaves her tied up, and sets off an alarm. Raina is returned with the remaining hostages. Together with Dayana, Leigh, Harry, Leon, and Sebastian, they try to figure out what connects them. CLF publicly executes Leigh after finding flaws in the information she revealed under interrogation. Raina is actually Nimah, who is working with CLF; the real Raina is tied up in a room. In flashbacks to the Farm, the trainees, using possibly inaccurate data, must discuss whether to use a drone to kill a potential terrorist. All except Alex would use the drone. Owen initiates the drone strike, telling them the data are accurate. Harry still wants to know why Ryan is there undercover. Nimah discovers Shelby has been getting close to Leon and suggests she goes undercover.
| 29 | 7 | "Lcflutter" | Steve Robin | Gideon Yago | November 13, 2016 | 2.75 |
Alex unties herself and finds the phone number of CLF's outside contact, who is Miranda. Alex tells Shelby the first six digits of the number but is caught by the terrorists, who ask her about the drives. They bring in Dayana for torture; when they threaten to break Dayana's spinal cord, Alex says Lydia took the drives and they leave to find Lydia. Harry, Sebastian, and León rescue Alex and Dayana. Meanwhile, Vice President Claire Haas is sworn in as president, invoking the 25th Amendment. In flashbacks to the Farm, Owen teaches the trainees interrogation techniques by having them torture him to extract his CIA alias. Alex and Harry feel they are going too far but the other trainees believe the opposite and start waterboarding Lydia in front of Owen until he breaks. Alex feels cut from the FBI mission when her colleagues meet without her. Shelby must choose between going undercover and never seeing León again. A cellphone call telling him he has been selected wakes Ryan outside the Farm.
| 30 | 8 | "Odenvy" | Reza Tabrizi | Justin Brenneman | November 27, 2016 | 2.29 |
With her ex-classmates, Alex plans to find and disarm the biological agent CLF has been threatening to release across New York City. A general in the United States Northern Command tells Miranda and Shelby of a plan to attack 28 Liberty Street, the location of CLF and the hostages. Miranda and Shelby oppose this plan. In flashbacks, the trainees are permitted to celebrate Thanksgiving outside the Farm if they create a successful cover story to protect their loved ones. Alex is officially cut from the FBI mission and she continues alone. Harry leaves for England. Ryan, Dayana, and León are given orders by the same mysterious contact, leading to an innocent's murder. The mission, which is successful, is for leverage; the contact threatens their ruin should they conduct any treason. In the present, Alex and Sebastian find the biological agent and realize it is only to be released in the crisis zone. After the others join them, CLF captures them all. Taken separately as a gunshot is heard, Ryan—who appears to be a CLF ally—kicks Alex out of the perimeter.
| 31 | 9 | "Cleopatra" | Gideon Raff | Marisha Mukerjee | January 23, 2017 | 2.90 |
Alex is taken back to FBI Headquarters, where she is questioned by Hannah Wyland about her involvement in the hostage crisis. She tells Hannah about her time at The Farm. Alex says Harry, Leon, Dayana, and Sebastien are still inside the crisis zone and that any of them could be a terrorist. Hannah refuses to believe Alex until she tells her Ryan is a terrorist. Hannah asks Shelby to review the recording of the interrogation to find evidence supporting Alex's story. Shelby discovers the terrorists are not the AIC but are hunting the AIC. She also discovers that Dayana and Mike Murray, who was killed during the terrorists' interrogation of Alex, were AIC agents who killed a CIA operative in Surabaya. Hannah and Shelby leave Alex alone in the room, from where Miranda takes her at gunpoint to a car. She tells Alex she is a terrorist and asks her to drive.
| 32 | 10 | "Jmpalm" | David McWhirter | Braden Marks | January 30, 2017 | 2.76 |
Miranda takes Alex back into the crisis zone, where they meet Nimah. Miranda brought Alex to find Lydia and the drives, but Nimah and Alex agree the hostages should be rescued. President Claire Haas reveals she inadvertently created the AIC and wants to cancel the planned air strike on them by having Shelby claim the AIC is fake. Shelby refuses and persuades the President to call off the strike. In flashbacks to The Farm, Harry pits Alex and Ryan against each other because Alex told Ryan she had her own AIC phone, and Miranda believes Alex may be an obstacle. After learning from Ryan about the AIC, Owen talks to Alex and reveals he is not the recruiter. Leon finds Nimah at Shelby's cover house; he knows they are FBI. Leon offers to work with the FBI and Nimah considers it. Later, Dayana, Leon, and Ryan meet other AIC recruits, as well as their recruiter, Lydia. Lydia tells Ryan Alex was not selected.
| 33 | 11 | "Zrtorch" | Kenneth Fink | Logan Slakter | February 6, 2017 | 2.68 |
At the Farm, Alex tries to persuade Owen that Lydia is an AIC member. Nimah tells Leon to get closer to Dayana so they can gather AIC information. Owen teaches the CIA recruits about extracting an asset. The recruits visit Germany for an exercise in extracting assets and collecting the asset's information. The asset is Owen, whom Alex works to protect and extract. Dayana and Leon are given an AIC mission to kill a woman they do not know; Leon stops Dayana from killing her. Back at the farm, Owen gives Alex a list of emails sent by Lydia, proving she is an AIC agent. In the present, Will, Ryan, and CLF members interrogate hostages until Will and Ryan stop them. Alex returns to the building to rescue Raina and they, Will, and Ryan start directing hostages to the exit. As they are leaving, Alex notices there are more hostages. Will explains that the CLF, after learning the interrogations have finished, have hidden themselves among the hostages.
| 34 | 12 | "Fallenoracle" | Ralph Hemecker | Jordon Nardino & Justin Brenneman | February 13, 2017 | 2.43 |
While escorting the hostages underground, Alex and Will find one man dead and another is missing. The dead man was a CLF member whom Will assumes was killed by the missing AIC member. They discover Sebastian's wife Carly is an AIC member; Carly holds Harry at gunpoint and threatens to kill him unless Alex hands over Will. Sebastian and Carly shoot each other; Carly dies and Sebastian is wounded. The FBI locates a group of hostages approaching the perimeter. Will and Dayana are missing. Alex finds Lydia, who has hidden the drives. In flashbacks to the Farm, Owen sends the recruits into an NSA building. Lydia gives Ryan an AIC mission to place a wiretap in the NSA. Alex asks Harry to cover for her to investigate Ryan's NSA task. In exchange, Alex gives Harry NSA information on wealthy Briton Sir Laurence Bishop. Alex finds a wiretap and puts a tracer on it. The recruits, except León, escape the building. Alex and Owen trace the wiretap to a building. As the two leave, someone enters the building, which explodes. Elliot stabs himself to death. León is ejected from the Farm.
| 35 | 13 | "Epicshelter" | Constantine Makris | Beth Schacter & Marisha Mukerjee | February 20, 2017 | 2.47 |
In flashbacks to the Farm, Harry cannot find incriminating information on Bishop. Harry decides to leave but his handler disagrees. Miranda has told Ryan to leave the Farm. The FBI arrives to investigate the death of Jeremy Miller, whom the FBI links to the CIA-owned wiretap. Sebastian gives Bishop's information to Director Keyes. Harry is ejected from the Farm and announces he is an MI6 agent. Owen takes responsibility for the wiretap and is arrested. Lydia ejects Alex from the Farm. In the present, Lydia takes Alex, Ryan, Harry, and León to find Dayana, Will, and the drives. Alex finds Dayana destroying the drives. Alex finds Will unconscious and the drives missing. Shelby interrogates Miranda and Nimah. Miller has faked his own death. The CIA instructors form a group—the CLF—to stop the AIC. The CLF recruited Miranda and learn the First Lady was involved with the AIC. Alex finds Lydia uploading data from one of the drives. Two weeks later, Alex, Dayana, Nimah, Shelby, and Ryan are called by Director Keyes and President Haas, who tell them the AIC is part of a larger threat and that they will be teamed up together.
| 36 | 14 | "Lnwilt" | Norman Buckley | Joshua Safran & Gideon Yago | March 20, 2017 | 3.31 |
The team learns they will be led by Keyes, Owen, and the President's son, Clay Haas. They learn the data Lydia uploaded was recently accessed to study the security and maintenance patterns of cargo airplanes. After a plane crashed in Kentucky, a company called GIP profited after short-selling the plane's cargo. The team attends a GIP party to find who was involved with the crash, but find GIP's goal was a Ponzi scheme. Alex is almost caught spying but is saved by Harry who, having been fired by MI6, is at GIP trying to find information on his own. Alex, with Harry's help, learns a company called ENGIN profited from both the crash and other attacks. León, convinced someone is hunting him, meets with Alex and Dayana, who believe he is paranoid. León is kidnapped leaving their meeting.
| 37 | 15 | "Mockingbird" | Patrick Norris | Cameron Litvack & Cami Delavigne | March 27, 2017 | 3.15 |
Lydia's data cache is accessed for information about emergency-response protocols, and is used to fake a chemical plant explosion in a Virginia city. The team learns a private military company Greypool hired Internet trolls to create the fake explosion, which Greypool uses to evacuate the city and hunt for a media guru, Mallory Haynes, who was hired by a U.S. Senator to create fake news. Nimah traces the cache information to Henry Roarke, the Speaker of the House. Meanwhile, Ryan deals with a journalist, Sasha Barinov, who threatens to expose him as a government agent unless he gives her a story. León is shown to have been killed.
| 38 | 16 | "Mktopaz" | Constantine Makris | Jon Derengowski & Sara Miller | April 3, 2017 | 2.96 |
The team finds one of the collaborators who accessed the cache, socialite Rebecca Sherman, who asks the team for help. A sniper kills Sherman and another collaborator, Thomas Roth. Harry searches for the sniper and finds Sebastian, who forces Harry at gunpoint to leave the team. Clay's fiancée gets upset when she realizes their upcoming wedding was used as a front to get to Rebecca; Shelby advises her to stay with him. Nimah tries to call Raina but, unbeknown to her, Raina is kidnapped and surrounded by planted evidence to frame her as a terrorist. Nimah confronts Ryan for revealing the Ponzi scheme to Sasha, who published the story.
| 39 | 17 | "Odyoke" | Steve Robin | Jordon Nardino | April 10, 2017 | 2.57 |
A shopping mall is the target of a terror attack, for which Raina is to be blamed. Raina escapes her kidnappers and asks Alex for help. The terror attack happens shortly before a vote on a Muslim registration bill; the team heads to Washington, D.C. to persuade voters to vote no. They fail and the bill is passed, but President Haas vetoes it. The team realizes the collaborators wanted Haas to veto it, making any future attack "her fault" and helping Henry Roarke become President. Nimah, realizing Raina will be arrested, switches places with her. Alex and Owen try to get information from one of Raina's kidnappers, but he is killed before they can get any information. Ryan, who has become close to Sasha, learns the FBI has marked her as an FSB asset.
| 40 | 18 | "Kumonk" | David McWhirter | Justin Brenneman | April 17, 2017 | 2.76 |
A series of civil disturbances occurs across America, one of which will help Roarke improve his reputation and destroy President Haas', favoring his bid to become President. Clay, believing his team will lose, goes to Claire to break up the team. Without Clay, Alex takes over as leader. The team finds a trial involving a bill Haas passed and realizes the trial may have been compromised by Roarke's collaborators. The jury passes a verdict, causing a riot outside the courthouse. Haas halts Roarke as he prepares to address the rioters and defame Haas, who gives her own address, improving her reputation nationwide. Sebastian sneaks into the team's bunker but Owen and Ryan find and interrogate him. Sebastian reveals he has been investigating Roarke's group and identifies the rest of the collaborators. Ryan still distrusts Sasha; Sasha claims she is on Ryan's side. Ryan goes to talk to Sasha but her car explodes as she enters it.
| 41 | 19 | "Mhorder" | Jennifer Lynch | Logan Slakter & Gideon Yago | April 24, 2017 | 2.59 |
Clay realizes the collaborators have been aware of, and ahead of, the team all along. The team decides to assemble the collaborators in one room by sending them each a Presidential invitation to Clay and Maxine's engagement party as a means of turning at least one of them against Roarke and the others. While the others fail, Ryan gets Alice Winter to confess to the murders of León and Sasha on tape, and apparently to cooperate. Alex thinks it is a trap, but the rest decide to continue with Ryan's plan. Owen suggests that, to catch the collaborators, Ryan should go to their side. Ryan goes to meet Alice Winter but finds a news reporter. The next day, news of the task force becomes public, threatening Haas' presidency. Alex erases all of the team's files on the collaborators and goes to meet them.
| 42 | 20 | "GlobalReach" | Cherien Dabis | Beth Schacter | May 1, 2017 | 2.65 |
Roarke uses the news to call for Claire Haas' impeachment or resignation. Clay and the team, minus Alex and Owen, try to find information on Roarke that would prevent him from becoming President. Raina tries to get Felix to help her find Nimah. Clay and Shelby fail to plant emails suggesting Roarke is collaborating with Russia on Felix's phone. Felix resigns from his job and breaks ties with Clay. Alex works with Alice Winter to force Keyes to resign from the CIA. As they are talking at the FBI, Alex realizes Alice has smuggled in a water bottle in her purse. The bottle contains gas that poisons the agents investigating President Haas, making her look guilty. Haas resigns as President but tells Alex to keep fighting.
| 43 | 21 | "Rainbow" | Patrick Norris | Cameron Litvack | May 8, 2017 | 2.54 |
Roarke signs thirty executive orders in five days and removes Lydia's cache from the Internet, leading Owen to realize the collaborators are near their endgame. Without Clay, Alex gets help from Will, Miranda, and Keyes to uncover Roarke's plans. Will learns ENGIN made profits from Avionics systems that have since been added to a number of airplanes. The team finds a hidden code in the software that allows a plane to be remotely controlled with a smartphone using popular, Collaborator-owned app. They realize Roarke's plan; on each of six flights are one person on Roarke's Muslim Registry Act with phones containing the app which, when connected to the plane's wi-fi, will allow the collaborators to control and crash the planes. Alex goes to Alice to find the flights while Shelby, with Raina's sacrifice, finds Clay to learn the FAA's code to request emergency landing. The team saves the flights but Roarke uses the team's success as an example; he announces their off-book operation was sanctioned and uses it to request a new Constitutional Convention to rewrite the U.S. Constitution.
| 44 | 22 | "Resistance" | Jim McKay | Joshua Safran | May 15, 2017 | 2.72 |
In the days before the Convention, the team starts vetting staff for Roarke's new government agency while secretly trying to stop Roarke from getting the votes needed to allow the Convention. Their plan is foiled by hidden microphones. With help from Will and Iris Chang, they decided to use an indirect approach. Will and Iris pick up Peter Theo at a bar and locate incriminating evidence on Roarke, which they give to the FSB, in exchange for which they ask Roarke to amend the new Constitution. At the Convention, Roarke's conversation with the FSB is recorded; Alex publicly broadcasts the recording and emails the evidence to the ACLU and other rights organizations before faking her death. Miranda is arrested for orchestrating Alex's fake death and Roarke, not willing to face the press or the police, commits suicide. Two months later, the rest of the team—including Maxine, Raina, and Nimah—are celebrating in the bunker. Ryan is absent, having joined Alex on a plane when she vanished.

== Cast ==
=== Main ===
- Priyanka Chopra as Alex Parrish
- Jake McLaughlin as Ryan Booth
- Aunjanue Ellis as Miranda Shaw
- Yasmine Al Massri as Nimah and Raina Amin
- Johanna Braddy as Shelby Wyatt
- Russell Tovey as Harry Doyle
- Pearl Thusi as Dayana Mampasi
- Blair Underwood as Owen Hall

=== Recurring ===
- Henry Czerny as Matthew Keyes
- Aarón Díaz as León Velez
- Tracy Ifeachor as Lydia Hall
- David Lim as Sebastian Chen
- Jay Armstrong Johnson as Will Olsen
- Graham Rogers as Caleb Haas
- Heléne Yorke as Leigh Davis
- Marcia Cross as Claire Haas
- Hunter Parrish as Clay Haas
- Krysta Rodriguez as Maxine Griffin
- Karolina Wydra as Sasha Barinov
- Jon Kortajarena as Felix Cordova
- Dennis Boutsikaris as Henry Roarke

=== Guest ===
- Eliza Coupe as Hannah Wyland
- Nolan Gerard Funk as Daniel Sharp
- Laila Robins as General Katherine Richards
- David Call as Jeremy Miller
- Donna Murphy as Rebecca Sherman
- Li Jun Li as Iris Chang
- Lara Pulver as Charlotte Bishop
- Javier Muñoz as Gabriel Carrera

== Production ==
=== Development ===
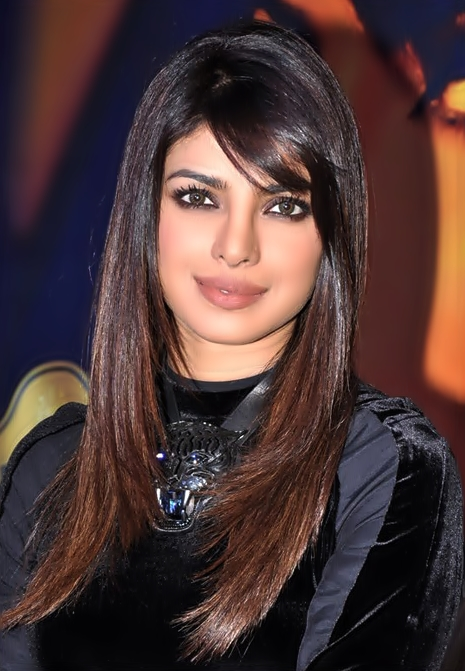
Priyanka Chopra plays the series' protagonist, Alex Parrish.

In March 2016, midway through the first season, American Broadcasting Company (ABC) announced that Quantico had been renewed for a second season. Following the season one finale, Joshua Safran told TV Guide the storyline of the second season, saying it will focus on the contrasting working ethics of the FBI and the CIA, saying:

"The CIA is very much about getting information and figuring things out before they happen and before they grow into something that will be a bigger problem, whereas the FBI is very much about an immediate problem that arises that they need to fix or keep under control. They work together really well and I thought that was something I hadn't really seen before."

Safran also said they were planning to make the second season more mature and darker than its predecessor to minimize confusion for the viewers. He called the second season more cohesive and said its structure would mirror the first season. In another interview, he confirmed the narrative would be slower than the previous season's, saying, "It will be a little bit of flash forward, but the majority will be, what I like to call, the present". In an interview with TVLine, Safran said the show's storyline would switch to a single timeline following the fourteenth episode; his intention after resolving all of the storyline. The second season was produced by ABC Studios in association with The Mark Gordon Company and Random Acts Productions. Safran, Mark Gordon, Robert Partner, Nicholas Pepper and Jorge Zamacona served as the executive producers.

=== Casting and filming ===
Following the season one finale, Safran confirmed the series regulars from the previous season would return. Safran expressed his interest in bringing back Cross's character Claire Haas; he thought it would be interesting to move her storyline forward. In early June 2016, Russell Tovey joined the show as a series regular, playing Harry Doyle, who was described as a "mischievous gadabout". The following month, Blair Underwood joined the regular cast, playing CIA officer Owen Hall. Pearl Thusi, the final new regular cast member, was cast as Dayana Mampasi, a "driven and disciplined type-A" attorney. Aarón Díaz was announced to have joined the series in a recurring role as photojournalist León Velez.

Following Díaz's casting, it was reported that Tracy Ifeachor and David Lim were cast in recurring roles as Lydia Hall and Sebastian Chen, respectively. In late July 2016, Henry Czerny, who played the CIA director Matthew Keyes in the season 1 finale, joined the cast in a recurring role. Safran revealed he was important for the second season storyline. The casting of Hunter Parrish and Krysta Rodriguez in the recurring roles of Clay Haas and Maxine Griffin, respectively, was announced in early 2017. In March 2017, it was announced that Spanish supermodel Jon Kortajarena would be joining the cast as Felix Cordova, a political operative.

For the second season, the production moved to New York City as Safran felt it was "much more a New York story". The second season was primarily shot at the Silvercup Studios and exterior scenes were filmed on location. Filming started on July 13, 2016, in New York and ended in mid-March 2017.

== Reception ==
=== Critical reception ===
The second season was well received by critics. Jasef Wisener of TVOvermind gave the premiere episode a rating of three and a half star, writing that it set up its sophomore season "effectively". Negative reactions included Allison Nichols of TV Fanatic, who was critical of the opening episode owing to the "confusing time jumps" and the "head-spinning plotlines". The episodes following the winter finale when the show's narrative switched to a single timeline garnered further praise by such critics as Madison Vain of the Entertainment Weekly and Kelsey McKinney of the New York Magazine, especially for its focus on character development. The latter thought the show finally found its groove and wrote, "for the first time since its first season, Quantico actually seems to know where it is headed. It's quite a welcome development, and the newfound confidence ... makes Quantico a much more enjoyable show to watch." In a full five-stars review of the sixteenth episode, McKinney wrote, "the show is grappling more and more with the emotions that make us all human, not just the ones that drive the story forward". The series' plotlines involving the current real-life political scenario such as a Muslim registry and Black Lives Matter were also praised.

=== Accolades ===
The second season was nominated for two People's Choice Awards at the 43rd People's Choice Awards: Favorite Network TV Drama and Favorite Dramatic TV Actress, winning the latter for Chopra.

=== Ratings ===
The season two premiere on September 25, 2016, had 3.64 million viewers, with a 1.0 rating among the adults 18–49 demographic; whereas the season one finale attracted 2.72 million viewers with 0.6 rating among adults 18–49. A few episodes into the season, the ratings started to fall below 3 million viewers. After the mid-season finale, the show moved to Mondays at 10:00 p.m. from January 23, 2017, where it continued to air for the rest of the season. The second season averaged 4.53 million viewers overall with a 1.3 rating among adults 18–49.

Viewership and ratings per episode of Quantico season 2
| No. | Title | Air date | Rating/share (18–49) | Viewers (millions) | DVR (18–49) | DVR viewers (millions) | Total (18–49) | Total viewers (millions) |
|---|---|---|---|---|---|---|---|---|
| 1 | "Kudove" | September 25, 2016 | 1.0/3 | 3.64 | 1.0 | 3.15 | 2.0 | 6.79 |
| 2 | "Lipstick" | October 2, 2016 | 1.0/3 | 3.57 | 1.0 | 2.87 | 2.0 | 6.44 |
| 3 | "Stescalade" | October 16, 2016 | 0.8/3 | 3.04 | 1.0 | 2.74 | 1.8 | 5.78 |
| 4 | "Kubark" | October 23, 2016 | 0.7/3 | 2.79 | 1.0 | 2.51 | 1.7 | 5.30 |
| 5 | "Kmforget" | October 30, 2016 | 0.6/2 | 2.43 | 0.9 | 2.66 | 1.5 | 5.09 |
| 6 | "Aquiline" | November 6, 2016 | 0.6/2 | 2.20 | 0.8 | 2.42 | 1.4 | 4.62 |
| 7 | "Lcflutter" | November 13, 2016 | 0.7/2 | 2.75 | 0.8 | 2.31 | 1.5 | 5.06 |
| 8 | "Odenvy" | November 27, 2016 | 0.7/2 | 2.29 | 0.7 | 2.28 | 1.4 | 4.57 |
| 9 | "Cleopatra" | January 23, 2017 | 0.8/3 | 2.90 | 0.9 | 2.21 | 1.7 | 5.13 |
| 10 | "Jmpalm" | January 30, 2017 | 0.7/3 | 2.76 | 0.8 | 1.98 | 1.5 | 4.74 |
| 11 | "Zrtorch" | February 6, 2017 | 0.7/2 | 2.68 | 0.7 | 1.88 | 1.4 | 4.49 |
| 12 | "Fallenoracle" | February 13, 2017 | 0.6/2 | 2.43 | —N/a | —N/a | —N/a | —N/a |
| 13 | "Epicshelter" | February 20, 2017 | 0.6/2 | 2.47 | 0.7 | 1.69 | 1.3 | 4.16 |
| 14 | "Lnwilt" | March 20, 2017 | 0.7/3 | 3.61 | 0.7 | 1.74 | 1.4 | 5.35 |
| 15 | "Mockingbird" | March 27, 2017 | 0.7/3 | 3.45 | 0.6 | —N/a | 1.3 | —N/a |
| 16 | "Mktopaz" | April 3, 2017 | 0.6/2 | 2.96 | 0.4 | 1.41 | 1.0 | 4.37 |
| 17 | "Odyoke" | April 10, 2017 | 0.6/2 | 2.57 | 0.5 | 1.61 | 1.1 | 4.18 |
| 18 | "Kumonk" | April 17, 2017 | 0.5/2 | 2.76 | 0.5 | 1.47 | 1.0 | 4.23 |
| 19 | "Mhorder" | April 24, 2017 | 0.5/2 | 2.59 | —N/a | —N/a | —N/a | —N/a |
| 20 | "GlobalReach" | May 1, 2017 | 0.6/2 | 2.65 | 0.5 | 1.43 | 1.1 | 4.08 |
| 21 | "Rainbow" | May 8, 2017 | 0.5/2 | 2.54 | 0.5 | 1.31 | 1.0 | 3.85 |
| 22 | "Resistance" | May 15, 2017 | 0.6/2 | 2.72 | 0.4 | —N/a | 1.0 | —N/a |
