= List of Quantico characters =

The cast of Quantico in the first season, from left to right: Josh Hopkins (Liam O'Connor), Aunjanue Ellis (Miranda Shaw), Priyanka Chopra (Alex Parrish), Jake McLaughlin (Ryan Booth), Yasmine Al Massri (Raina Amin), Tate Ellington (Simon Asher), Graham Rogers (Caleb Haas) and Johanna Braddy (Shelby Wyatt).

Quantico is an American television series created by Joshua Safran and produced by ABC Studios. Priyanka Chopra stars as Alex Parrish, a bright FBI recruit, who after graduating from the FBI Academy, joins the agency and later becomes a prime suspect of a terrorist attack on Grand Central Terminal.

The main cast include Priyanka Chopra, Jake McLaughlin, Yasmine Al Massri, Johanna Braddy, Tate Ellington, Graham Rogers, Anabelle Acosta as her fellow recruits, and Josh Hopkins and Aunjanue Ellis as their trainers at the FBI academy, Quantico, Virginia. In the second season, Russell Tovey, Pearl Thusi, and Blair Underwood were added to the main cast following the CIA plot elements. In the third season, Marlee Matlin and Alan Powell were added to the main cast.

== Overview ==
Character	Portrayed by	Season		
Character	Portrayed by	1	2	3
Main
Alex Parrish	Priyanka Chopra	Main	Main	Main
Liam O'Connor	Josh Hopkins	Main		
Ryan Booth	Jake McLaughlin	Main	Main	Main
Miranda Shaw	Aunjanue Ellis	Main	Main	
Caleb Haas	Graham Rogers	Main	Guest	
Nimah and Raina Amin	Yasmine Al Massri	Main	Main	
Shelby Wyatt	Johanna Braddy	Main	Main	Main
Simon Asher	Tate Ellington	Main		
Natalie Vasquez	Anabelle Acosta	Main		
Harry Doyle	Russell Tovey		Main	Main
Dayana Mampasi	Pearl Thusi		Main	
Owen Hall	Blair Underwood		Main	Main
Jocelyn Turner	Marlee Matlin			Main
Mike McQuigg	Alan Powell			Main
Recurring
Season 1
Elias Harper	Rick Cosnett	Recurring		
Clayton Haas	Mark Pellegrino	Recurring		
Brandon Fletcher	Jacob Artist	Recurring		
Hannah Wyland	Eliza Coupe	Recurring	Recurring	
Claire Haas	Marcia Cross	Recurring	Recurring	Recurring
Drew Perales	Lenny Platt	Recurring	Recurring	
Iris Chang	Li Jun Li	Recurring		
Will Olsen	Jay Armstrong Johnson	Recurring	Recurring	
Matthew Keyes	Henry Czerny		Recurring	
Season 2
León Velez	Aarón Díaz		Recurring	
Lydia Hall	Tracy Ifeachor		Recurring	
Sebastian Chen	David Lim		Recurring	
Clay Haas	Hunter Parrish		Recurring	
Maxine Griffin	Krysta Rodriguez		Recurring	
Henry Roarke	Dennis Boutsikaris		Recurring	
Season 3
Celine Fox	Amber Skye Noyes			Recurring
Jagdeep Patel	Vandit Bhatt			Recurring
The Widow	Jayne Houdyshell			Recurring

== Main characters ==
=== Alex Parrish ===
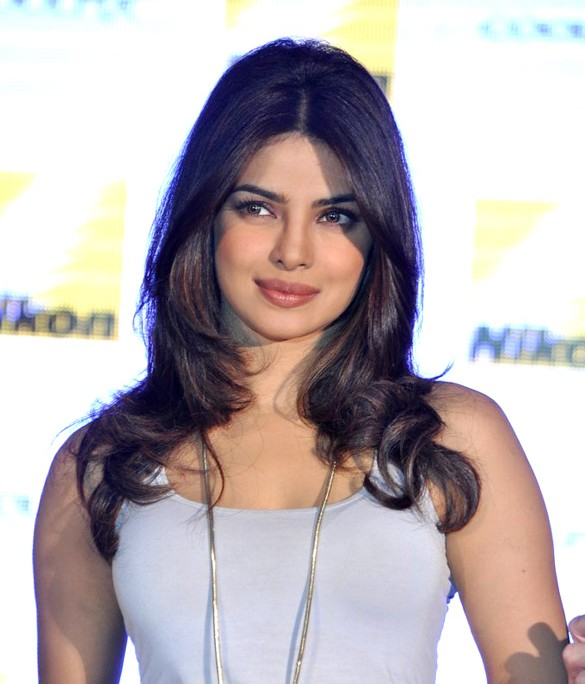
Priyanka Chopra

Alexandra "Alex" Parrish (portrayed by Priyanka Chopra), a former top recruit at Quantico as well as a promising FBI agent was considered a prime suspect in the Grand Central Terminal bombing. She was later pardoned after the real mastermind terrorist behind the Grand Central bombing and the Command Center bombing in New York was revealed.

After the negative publicity to the FBI stemming from Liam O'Connor's treachery as well as Simon Asher's death at Quantico, Alex is fired by the organization. Two months after the presidential election ended, Alex is approached by CIA director Matthew Keyes, who provides an opportunity for her to join and work for the organization. After working as a CIA analyst for six months, she is given an undercover assignment by the FBI. She is tasked to pose as a CIA recruit at The Farm in order to expose the rogue faction within the agency called the AIC.

Months after leaving The Farm, a hostage crisis at the G-20 summit in New York is declared by a terrorist group called the Citizens Liberation Front. Two weeks after the end of the crisis, former President Claire Haas and CIA director Matthew Keyes put forth a covert joint task force, between the CIA and FBI. Alex was reinstated to work as an FBI agent. Shortly after the task force is formed, Clay Haas was assigned as the leader of the group. Alex and the team were tasked to expose a syndicate of eight collaborators that were secretly involved in orchestrating the hostage crisis. After a national scandal involving the resignation of President Claire Haas along with the disbandment of the task force, Alex resorted to a final strategy. She released U.S classified intelligence to the public at the Constitutional Convention in Philadelphia, implicating newly inaugurated President Henry Roarke in a deadly conspiracy. As a result of her actions at the Convention, she is branded as a fugitive of the United States. After being issued a Red Notice for her arrest by Interpol, she leaves the country with Ryan Booth on a plane to Thailand in order to evade the authorities.

=== Liam O'Connor ===
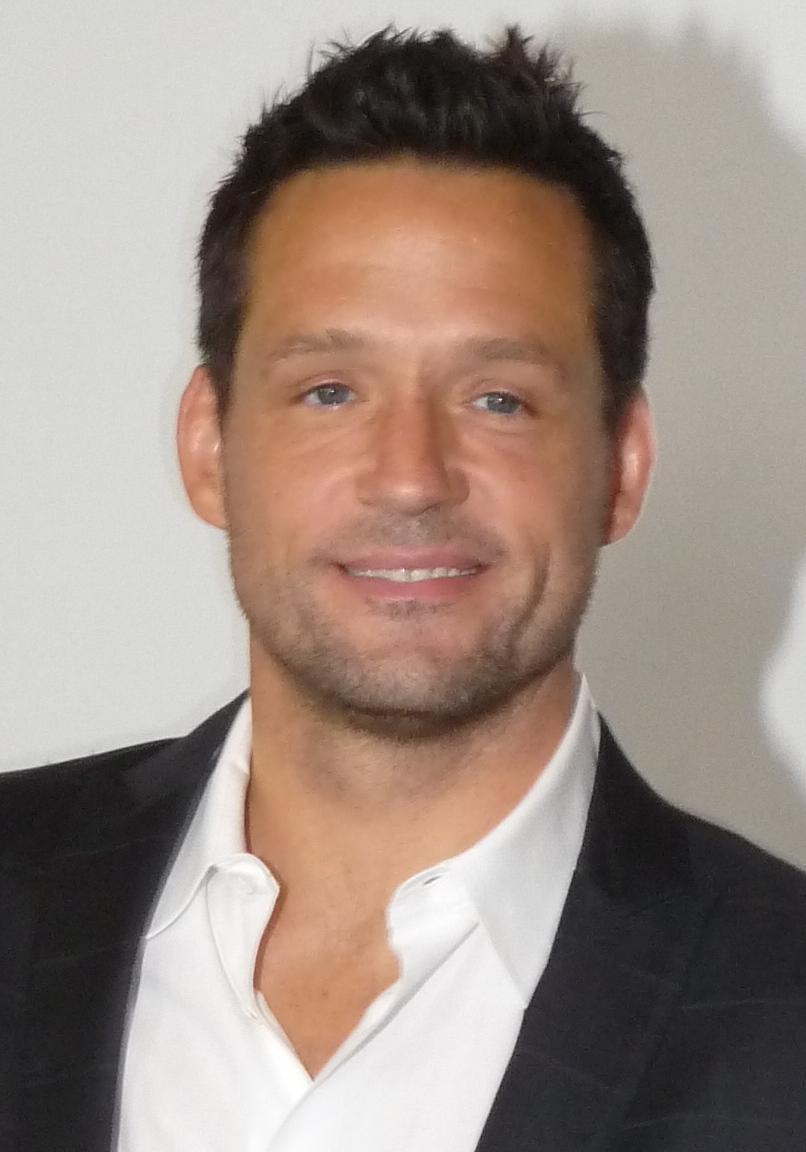
Josh Hopkins

Liam O'Connor (portrayed by Josh Hopkins; season 1), a seasoned FBI agent who had a fling with Miranda Shaw in the past. Years ago, he and Alex's father had graduated from the FBI academy together and one of their first undercover operations in Omaha was a blown sting killing over 200 people. Years later, he worked a sting operation against some militia groups in Chicago. Just before the case went south, ending in a shootout with three confirmed casualties including Drew's fiancée and unborn child, he had told Ryan that he would take the blame and that Ryan would be his replacement. However, it was later revealed that Ryan took the blame for the incident, later losing his position within the Bureau.

One year prior to the Grand Central bombing, it was revealed that Liam was demoted from his position within the Bureau. However, Miranda pulled strings to allow him to work as an instructor at the Academy. During his time at the Academy, he had a one-night stand with one of the recruits, Alex, on New Year's Eve. Although Miranda discovered the incident, she was shortly dismissed prior to pursuing the misconduct case with Liam. Sometime later Liam was promoted to the position of Assistant Director, replacing Miranda's former role at the Academy.

Months after Alex and the recruits graduated from Quantico, Liam was assigned to work in a field office based in Washington. After the Grand Central bombing occurred, Alex was considered a main suspect in the case. As a result, he pursued her until she managed to clear her name. Three months after the Command Center bombing occurred, it was revealed that he testified against Elias Harper in the congressional hearing case. Later Miranda discovered that he was the true terrorist behind the two bombings in New York, right before he shot her. It was subsequently revealed that he had used hidden cameras and tracking devices to plan the bombings, and had gathered intelligence to blackmail Elias and frame both Alex and Simon. His objective was to destroy the Bureau before the organization got an opportunity to destroy the country. Initially, he tried to frame Miranda, but Alex and the others discovered his plan to plant a bomb at the FBI Academy, the day the new recruits were graduating. He was unsuccessful; the bomb was later defused by Simon's actions. Subsequently, he was killed by Alex and Ryan.

=== Ryan Booth ===
Ryan Booth (portrayed by Jake McLaughlin) is a former Marine and FBI Special Agent. During his time at Quantico, Ryan was undercover as a recruit, tasked to surveil Alex by Liam, but fell in love with her instead. Liam later revealed to him that he was, in fact, in retraining. During this time, he has a relationship with Alex. Afterwards, he takes over Miranda's role as staff counselor.

After the Grand Central Terminal bombing, Ryan is working in the New York Office and is in a relationship with Natalie Vasquez and, along with their friends, helps Alex clear her name. However, when Alex persists in investigating when everyone believes Elias Harper was the terrorist, he becomes suspicious of her and is determined to stop her. After his ex-wife, Hannah Wyland, is suspended from active duty after an incident with Senator Haas, Ryan takes over her position under Liam's orders. He finally realizes Alex is innocent and helps the team find the true terrorist, Liam, and he and Alex shoot him. He and Alex reconcile thereafter, but their travel plans are thwarted by Alex's CIA job offer.

In the future timeline, he becomes a CIA case officer after completing his training at Camp Peary. At the end of the second season, he is branded as a criminal and leaves the United States in order to evade the authorities.

In season 3 he marries Shelby Wyatt (even though he still has feelings for Alex Parrish), as it is revealed in the premiere of the season. In this same episode Ryan tries to save Shelby, who has been kidnapped by The Widow (who will free her if he gives her a code Alex has).

=== Miranda Shaw ===
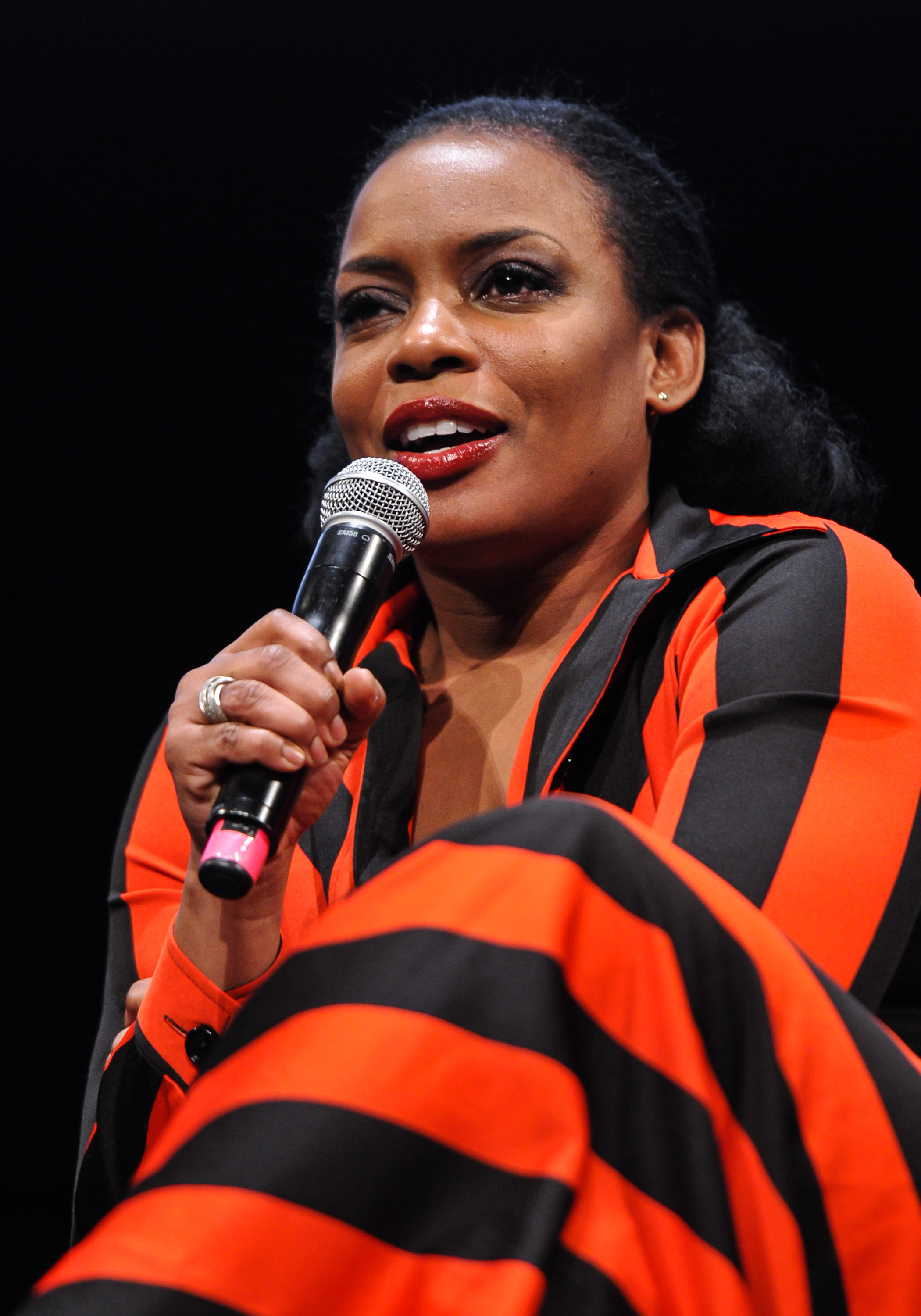
Aunjanue Ellis

Miranda Shaw (portrayed by Aunjanue Ellis; seasons 1 & 2), Assistant Director of the FBI Academy at Quantico, director of the training program at Quantico and Alex's mentor. She had a fling with Liam O'Connor when they both were married. She is removed from her prestigious role at Quantico after allowing an undercover operation involving a trainee, Raina, to continue.

After the Grand Central Terminal bombing, Miranda is one of the people who believes in Alex's innocence and takes great risks to help her. At the end of the first season, Miranda is named Deputy Director of the FBI.

In the future, she is shown to be a representative of the terrorist group, the Citizens Liberation Front. Sometime later, Miranda is incarcerated in a federal prison due to orchestrating what appears to be an attempted murder of Alex Parrish at the Constitutional Convention in Philadelphia.

=== Caleb Haas ===
Caleb Haas (portrayed by Graham Rogers; season 1, main; 2, guest) was an FBI trainee who originally flunked out of the Academy as an agent, but was brought back to train as an analyst, and then reinstated as an agent-trainee again. He is the son of FBI Deputy Director Clayton Haas and Senator Claire Haas.

At 17, he joined a cult called Sistemics but his father pulled him out. During his time at Quantico, he uses the name Mark Raymond in an undercover operation to infiltrate Sistemics, in an operation coordinated with his father to lure out Sistemics' leader and Kentucky bombing suspect Dan Berlin.

Prior to the Grand Central Terminal Attack, Caleb was stationed as an analyst in San Diego, but requested a transfer to New York. During the Command Center bombing, his father saved his life before he died when the building fell over him. As a result, Caleb became a drug addict and his mother locked him up at her home so he would not affect her election chances. Caleb left with Alex and he went through withdrawal, with Alex and Shelby's help. He later helped track down the true terrorist, Liam.

In the second-season premiere, Shelby mentioned that he resigned from the FBI and commenced study at a law school in UC Berkeley. After the 2018 Hostage crisis ended, it was revealed that Caleb vacated in Tulum, Mexico prior to visiting his mother and brother in Washington, D.C. During his visit, he gets into a brief physical fight with his brother Clay Haas. Later, Caleb agrees to a living arrangement with his brother at Camp Peary. Caleb helps the team with their mission in order to expose the collaborators associated with 2018 Hostage Crisis event. After the mission ends, he goes back to UCB to continue his studies.

=== Nimah and Raina Amin ===
Nimah and Raina Amin (portrayed by Yasmine Al Massri; seasons 1 & 2), twins brought into the program by Miranda, who masquerade as one person under Nimah's name. The aggressive and secular Nimah desperately wants to be a special agent but is not quite up to the physical and mental challenge, while the more religious Raina is better suited to the role, but only entered training because Nimah wanted it so much. Eventually, they are allowed to be revealed to the NATs. The main physical difference between the two is that Raina wears the hijab and is a devout Muslim and Nimah does not and is not.

In the future timeline, Nimah and Raina are working undercover in a terrorist cell. Three months after the second bombing hit, Nimah is working as an agent in the New York branch, and Raina has left the FBI because Nimah reported her for being too emotionally involved with Hamza, whose terrorist cell they were infiltrating prior to the Command Center bombing. Raina initially moved home to Dearborn, Michigan, but later became a high-level diplomatic translator, while Nimah stayed on at the FBI.

In the future, Nimah joins the terrorist organization, the Citizens Liberation Front, while Raina becomes the conference interpreter at the 2018 G-20 summit in New York. Shortly after the 2018 Hostage Crisis event, the twin sisters are arrested. Sometime later, they are freed from prison and pardoned for their earlier case arrests.

=== Shelby Wyatt ===
Shelby Wyatt (portrayed by Johanna Braddy) is Alex's best friend and an excellent markswoman. She is wealthy and her family owns the McGregor-Wyatt company. Shelby's parents were supposedly killed on 9/11, when she was 16, leading her to join the FBI to try to stop future terrorist attacks within the United States.

Shelby thought she had a half-sister named Samar Hashmi, who she sent money regularly until Caleb found out she was a con artist. Also with Caleb's help, she later learned her parents faked their deaths after unknowingly selling weapons software to the Taliban. Her parents meet her in Canada, but Caleb discovered they were only interested in conning more money from her. Though Caleb tried to protect her from the truth, when she learned it, she contacted Deputy Director Haas to bring them to justice. Her parents were eventually killed in a plane crash.

She had a relationship with Caleb in the Academy, and later, she had an affair with Caleb's father, FBI Deputy Director Clayton Haas, before he was killed in the second bombing. After the scandal, Shelby was no longer considered an FBI agent because her relationship with Clayton was exposed as part of the process of the congressional testimony for the Command Center bombing. She returned to running her family company. After she mended her friendship with Alex, she tried to infiltrate the FBI computer systems, in order to help Alex stop the mastermind terrorist from plotting another bombing. At the end of the first season, Miranda reinstates Shelby as an agent.

In the future, Shelby is working on a case to prevent further threats stemming from the hostage crisis, perpetuated by the Citizens Liberation Front. Sometime later, Shelby becomes a training instructor at the FBI academy in Quantico.

She is a member of Clay Hass' team during the second half of season 2. During that time she develops romantic feelings for him. However, knowing she's not the right woman for him (nor for any of the Hass men) she convinces Clay to marry his ex-fiancé.

It is revealed in the premiere of season 3 that she has married Ryan during the time Alex was in Italy.

=== Simon Asher ===
Simon Asher (portrayed by Tate Ellington; season 1) was an FBI recruit at Quantico. After graduating summa cum laude from Yale University, he worked as an accountant for his family's company, and later he spent almost two years in the Israel Defense Forces before applying to the FBI. He developed a fascination with Nimah and Raina, who discover that he spent part of his life in Gaza. Later on it is revealed that Raina and him are romantically involved.

After being kicked out of the FBI academy, he worked as an IT tech. When Alex is framed for the Grand Central bombing, she reached out to him to help her. Without her knowing, he was a deep cover FBI informant who had to turn her in, as an order from Clayton Haas. However, he believed and helped her, even falling in the hands of the terrorist, who forced him to build an atomic bomb. Drew helped him escape, at the cost of his own life, and Simon managed to get to Alex on time.

After the exposure of Liam O'Connor as the perpetrator of the attacks in New York, Simon tried to help his former classmates in defusing another bomb that was implanted by their former instructor at Quantico. Driving the truck with the nuclear bomb, he sacrifices himself in order to minimize the risk of radiation fallout.

=== Natalie Vasquez ===
Natalie Vasquez (portrayed by Anabelle Acosta; season 1) was Alex's former rival in academy standings and for Ryan's heart as well. Texas-born Natalie was a former border cop and was involved in a custody battle for her daughter Renata with her ex-husband. While at the Academy, she had a relationship with Brandon Fletcher.

In the events after the attack, she is shown to have become an FBI agent and is one of the agents hunting down Alex. She was also in a relationship with Ryan. Shortly after Natalie helps Alex discover the real terrorist, Natalie is killed by an explosion. Later, it was revealed that Liam O'Connor orchestrated the bomb that killed Natalie in "Clear".

=== Harry Doyle ===
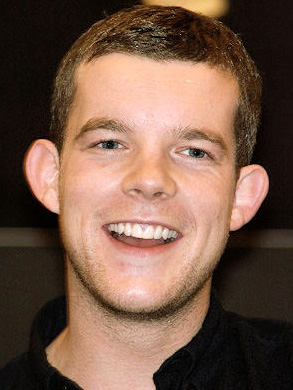
Russell Tovey

Harry Doyle (portrayed by Russell Tovey; seasons 2 & 3) is a mysterious character who is best described as part Thomas Crown, part grown-up Artful Dodger. After failing to complete his MI-6 sanctioned mission at Camp Peary, he attends the G-20 summit in New York as a private security expert for Barclays. After the 2018 Hostage Crisis ended, Harry was given an opportunity to join the task force headed by Clay Haas. Shortly after joining the team, he leaves the task force.

=== Dayana Mampasi ===
Dayana Mampasi (portrayed by Pearl Thusi; season 2) is a driven, disciplined, type-A lawyer working at her parents' Boston firm who struggles to fit into the world of espionage. After graduating from her CIA training, Dayana becomes a CIA case officer. After the 2018 Hostage Crisis ended, Dayana becomes part of the covert joint task force put forth by President Claire Haas and CIA director Matthew Keyes. After helping the task force with their missions, she goes back to her work life as a cover.

=== Owen Hall ===
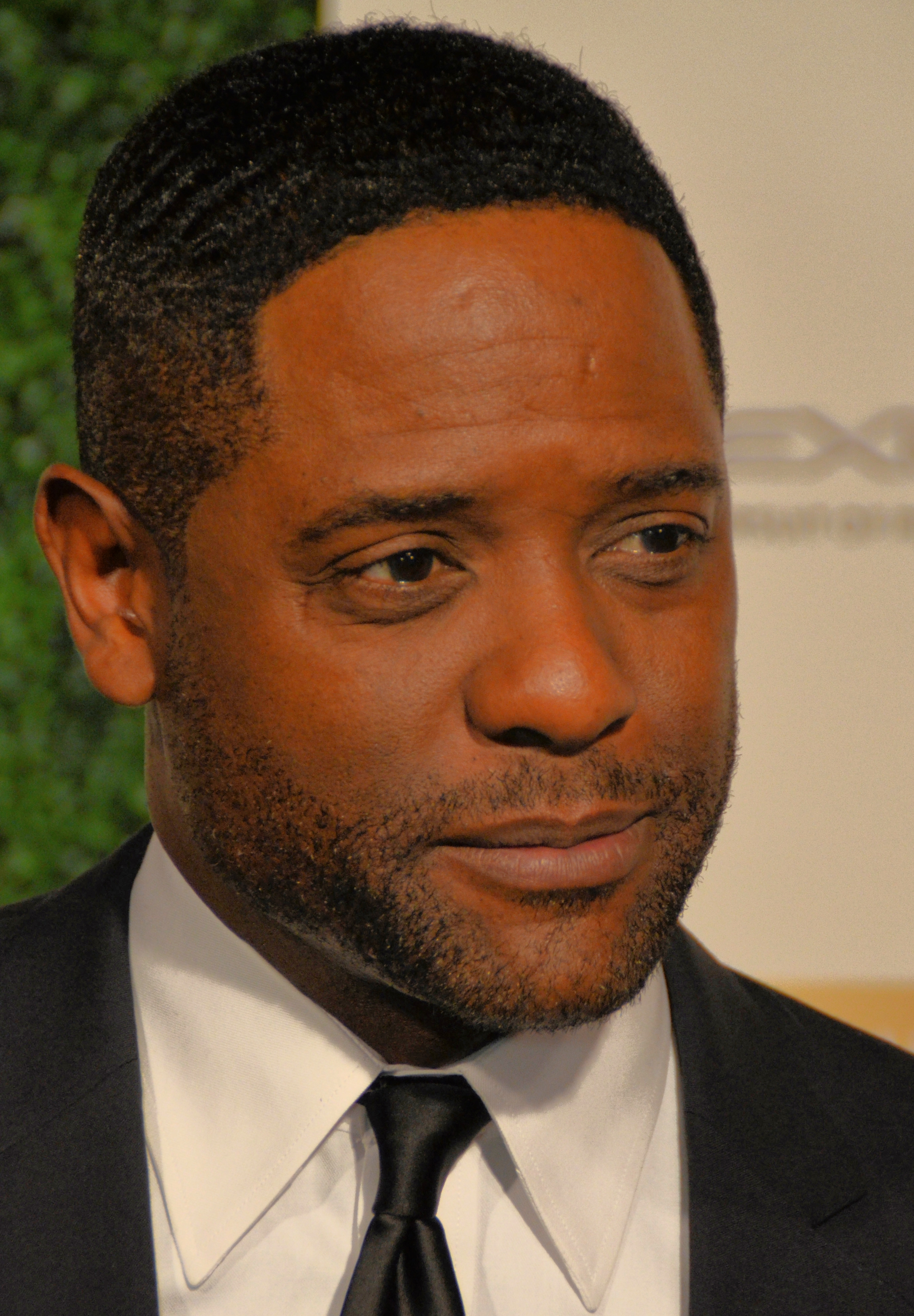
Blair Underwood

Owen Hall (portrayed by Blair Underwood; seasons 2 & 3), a charming, intelligent and inspirational CIA officer who every fledgling operative wishes he or she could learn from. In the future, it was revealed that he was forced out of the CIA for an incident and incarcerated in a federal prison as a result. Sometime later, Owen was pardoned for his false arrest in relation to the Jeremy Miller murder case. Shortly after, he was given an opportunity to serve in the role of the Deputy Director of the CIA. Sometime later, he left the Agency for a position at the Bureau as a Deputy Director.

=== Jocelyn Turner ===
Jocelyn Turner (portrayed by Marlee Matlin; season 3), an FBI agent with a brilliant career in undercover work. She was once the best in her field until an assignment involving the arms dealer known as "The Widow" left her deaf from a bombing after her cover was blown. Following this, Jocelyn was put to work as a Quantico instructor, but is recruited by old friend Owen Hall to assist in the rescue of Agent Shelby Wyatt from "The Widow", and later to be a part of a special black-ops team.

=== Mike McQuigg ===
Mike McQuigg (portrayed by Alan Powell; season 3), an "overly assertive" and adept FBI operative, with over two years of undercover work experience within a white supremacist militia in the South. He was called into action to help out the black ops team, having expertise and intelligence about the organization, who instigated a biological attack on a restaurant in a black community with weaponized tuberculosis with the intention of committing similar attacks. Following the takedown of the organization, Mike was assigned to the team on a permanent basis.

== Recurring characters ==
This is a list of recurring actors and the characters they portrayed in multiple episodes, which were significant roles. The characters are listed by the order in which they first appeared.

=== Introduced in season one ===
==== Elias Harper ====
Elias Harper (portrayed by Rick Cosnett) was a lawyer recruited by Miranda Shaw to work as an analyst at Quantico. He flunked out the Academy in "Go". He later framed Simon as the suspect of the Command Center bombing before committing suicide. It was later discovered that he'd been blackmailed by Liam O'Connor in "Yes".

==== Clayton Haas ====
Clayton Haas (portrayed by Mark Pellegrino) was an Executive Assistant Director of the FBI and the husband of Claire Haas, with whom he had three children: Clay, Caleb, and Cassandra. He had an affair with Shelby Wyatt. He was killed at the Command Center bombing after saving his son Caleb's life.

==== Brandon Fletcher ====
Brandon Fletcher (portrayed by Jacob Artist) is an African-American FBI trainee who later becomes an FBI agent. He comes from a wealthy family. He had a relationship with Natalie Vasquez.

==== Hannah Wyland ====
Hannah Wyland (portrayed by Eliza Coupe) is Ryan Booth's ex-wife and fellow FBI Special Agent. She left him because she had fallen in love with a woman. Previously, she worked at the field office in New York before being suspended from active duty due to orchestrating an incident involving former Senator Claire Haas. She was reprimanded for her actions as she caused a disturbance in the town hall where Mrs. Haas was at for her vice-presidential campaign and presentation. Later, she is reinstated to work again as a federal agent in the 2018 Hostage Crisis case.

==== Claire Haas ====
Claire Haas (portrayed by Marcia Cross) is Caleb's mother and Clayton Haas' wife. An ambitious woman and former FBI agent, she was a senator and Democratic vice presidential nominee. At the end of the first season, it was revealed that Claire assisted Liam O'Connor in the execution of his plans so that it would politically benefit her vice presidential campaign. Shortly after Liam's death, Claire becomes the vice president of the United States. In "Lcflutter", she is sworn in as president, invoking the 25th Amendment following the resignation of President Todd. However, she is forced to resign in "Globalreach" as a result of a national scandal.

==== Drew Perales ====
Drew Perales (portrayed by Lenny Platt) was a retired NFL player and FBI recruit, before leaving the academy due to a medical condition. While at Quantico, he had a short-lived romantic relationship with Alex Parrish. He was blackmailed and later captured by Liam O'Connor, who used his voice to disguise his trail. He helped Simon escape and warned Alex, but he was killed when the FBI burst in the room that he was held in, triggering a bomb trap in "Right".

==== Iris Chang ====
Iris Chang (portrayed by Li Jun Li) is a Shanghai-born, Queen Bee-type tech maven from a wealthy family who founded six startups in college, two of which were sold to Google. Later, she becomes an FBI recruit at Quantico. After the graduation ceremony at the end of the first season, she becomes an FBI agent.

==== Will Olsen ====
Will Olsen (portrayed by Jay Armstrong Johnson) is a former FBI trainee and CIA asset. He graduated from Harvard University with a Ph.D. at the age of 22, who once worked in the JPL. Years ago, he lost his sister in a car accident, after their parents, who were Christian Science followers, refused to allow a blood transfusion. He did not graduate from Quantico and was later held by the CIA for seven months, until Alex and Simon helped him escape. The terrorist forced him and Simon to go with him and help him build an atomic bomb. He was later released with radiation sickness, but he recovered. Afterwards, he became an IT security expert at the Semple Institute and, later, joined the Citizens Liberation Front.

==== Matthew Keyes ====
Matthew Keyes (portrayed by Henry Czerny) is the director of the CIA who offered Alex Parrish a position within the organization. Shortly after the 2018 Hostage Crisis ended, it was revealed that he worked with Claire Haas in setting up the Presidential Covert Joint Task Force.

=== Introduced in season two ===
==== León Velez ====
León Velez (portrayed by Aarón Díaz) was a photojournalist and CIA recruit, before leaving Camp Peary as a result of failing a training assignment. Sometime later, León attends the 2018 G-20 summit in New York. As a photojournalist, he covered the events at the summit prior to the hostage takeover by the Citizens Liberation Front. Shortly after the crisis ended, it was revealed that he was murdered by assailants connected to the AIC.

==== Lydia Hall ====
Lydia Hall (portrayed by Tracy Ifeachor) is a CIA case officer and co-instructor at The Farm. Originally posing as just another recruit with the surname Bates, she and Owen Hall revealed her true role as a lesson to the others. As co-instructor, she's pushed Alex Parrish really hard during the training exercises. Towards the end of the 2018 Hostage Crisis, it was revealed that she uploaded contents of a hard drive containing top secret classified information of the United States. As a result of her actions, she was incarcerated in a federal prison, where she was murdered by Conor Devlin's men.

==== Sebastian Chen ====
Sebastian Chen (portrayed by David Lim) is a former priest and CIA recruit. After graduating from his CIA training, Sebastian becomes a CIA case officer. Sometime later, he attends the 2018 G-20 summit in New York. During the summit, a hostage crisis erupts and Sebastian is later injured. Shortly after the crisis ended, it was revealed that Sebastian attempted to research the identities of The Collaborators who benefited from the 2018 Hostage Crisis event.

==== Clay Haas ====
Clayton "Clay" Haas Jr. (portrayed by Hunter Parrish) is a political advisory strategist, responsible for leading the Presidential Covert Joint Task Force that was set up by the CIA Director Matthew Keyes and Madam President Claire Haas. In "Resistance", it was revealed that his former team members from the task force were able to implicate Henry Roarke by exposing his connection to the Russian Federal Security Service. During the second half of season 2 he grows emotionally involved with Shelby Wyatt. However Shelby convinces him to marry his ex-fiance.

==== Maxine Griffin ====
Maxine Griffin (portrayed by Krysta Rodriguez) is an intelligent, passionate and fiercely driven founder of “the Roster”, a network and visibility platform for professional women committed to helping one another rise. At the end of the second season, it was revealed that she eloped with Clay Haas.

==== Henry Roarke ====
Henry Roarke (portrayed by Dennis Boutsikaris) was a former U.S President and the Speaker of the United States House of Representatives. He was identified as one of the eight collaborators behind the group that initially planned on instigating the 2018 Hostage Crisis event at the G-20 summit in New York. At the Constitutional Convention in Philadelphia, it was revealed that a scandal emerged about Roarke being involved with the Federal Security Service who provided intelligence to amend the United States Constitution. Shortly after the publicized scandal, Roarke committed suicide by shooting himself.

=== Introduced in season three ===
==== Celine Fox ====
Celine Fox (portrayed by Amber Skye Noyes) was a new recruit of an elite FBI black ops team. She was accidentally killed by Jocelyn Turner when the two were pitted against each other in a blindfolded fight by a sadistic arms dealer.

==== Jagdeep Patel ====
Jagdeep Patel (portrayed by Vandit Bhatt) was a new recruit of an elite FBI black ops team. He resigned from the team following Celine's death, and due to being unable to handle the seemingly cold-blooded mentality of the veteran team members.

==== The Widow ====
The Widow (portrayed by Jayne Houdyshell) took over her husband's arms dealer business after his death and made great strides in networking with various clients in the arms industry. Her associates kidnapped Shelby in an attempt to have her colleagues, Alex and Ryan, work for them in order to obtain a mysterious object called the Conscience Code.
