= Alex Parrish =

Fictional character in Quantico

- Quantico character
- Priyanka Chopra as Alex Parrish
- First appearance: "Run"
- Last appearance: "Who Are You"
- Created by: Joshua Safran
- Portrayed by: Priyanka Chopra

In-universe information
- Full name: Alexandra Parrish
- Nickname: Alex
- Species: Human
- Gender: Female
- Occupation: FBI agent; Former CIA analyst
- Family: Michael Parrish (father); Sita Parrish (mother)
- Significant other: Ryan Booth (ex-fiancé)
- Nationality: Indian American

Alexandra Parrish is a fictional character and the protagonist of the American television drama thriller series Quantico on ABC. The character was created by Joshua Safran and is portrayed by Indian actress Priyanka Chopra. Her casting has received widespread praise and media attention, crediting ABC for bringing more diversity to a mainstream American series on a big network.

The focal point of the series, Alex was introduced as a recruit at the FBI Academy, Quantico, Virginia. Alex eventually became an FBI field agent and later the prime suspect for a terrorist attack on Grand Central Terminal. Despite clearing her name, she was fired from the Bureau and went on to join the CIA, where she was later named a fugitive for releasing classified U.S. intelligence to the public. The series focuses on her struggle to keep her country safe, while juggling her career and maintaining her on and off relationship with boyfriend Ryan Booth and her friendship with her best friend Shelby Wyatt. Originally conceived as a white character, Alex's characterization changed significantly following Chopra's casting, which came as a result of a talent holding deal ABC Studios had with the actress.

The character has garnered positive reviews from critics and Chopra was immediately praised for portraying her, with James Poniewozik of The New York Times naming her the "strongest human asset" of the show, while other critics have called her "charismatic and commanding". For her performance as Alex, Chopra has won two People's Choice Awards: Favorite Actress in a New TV Series in 2016, making her the first South Asian to win a People's Choice Award, and Favorite Dramatic TV Actress in 2017.

== Character storyline ==
=== Early life ===
Alex was born on July 18, 1982. She grew up in Oakland, California, with her parents Michael and Sita. Her father was an alcoholic and physically abusive towards his wife. When Alex was in her pre-teenage years, Michael was killed during a violent episode against Sita. The police declined to press charges, unaware that Alex was responsible for Michael's death. Alex was then sent to live with Sita's family in Mumbai, India. Alex returned to the United States, where she enrolled at the FBI Academy in 2015. Unknown to the Bureau, Alex had discovered that her father was a former FBI agent and had applied to learn more about his past. Alex kept her activities a secret from Sita, telling her mother that she was starting graduate school. A stuffed bear wearing a UC Berkeley sweater can be seen on her desk in the fifteenth episode of the first season, suggesting that she may have attended the University of California, Berkeley, prior to enrolling at Quantico.

=== Training at Quantico ===
On her way to Quantico, Alex has sex with a stranger, Ryan Booth (Jake McLaughlin), only to discover that he, too, is a new trainee. At the academy, Alex befriends her fellow New Agent Trainees (NATs), particularly her roommate, Shelby Wyatt (Johanna Braddy), Nimah and Raina Amin (Yasmine Al Massri), Simon Asher (Tate Ellington), Eric Packer (Brian J. Smith), Brandon Fletcher (Jacob Artist), Elias Harper (Rick Cosnett), and Caleb Haas (Graham Rogers). She gains a rival in Natalie Vasquez (Anabelle Acosta), and begins a romantic relationship with Ryan. The NATs are trained vigorously on a daily basis, learning different lessons presented every week by the supervising training agent Liam O'Connor (Josh Hopkins) under the guidance of Deputy Director Miranda Shaw (Aunjanue Ellis). Alex discovers that Liam had hired Ryan to spy on her from day one and even earlier. She also learns the truth about her father.

After the merging of two different classes at Quantico, Alex is partnered with Drew Perales (Lenny Platt), who used to play for the Chicago Bears before joining the Bureau. Several other NATs are also included as part of the merge, including Iris Chang (Li Jun Li) and Will Olsen (Jay Armstrong Johnson). During her training at Quantico, Alex learns that Liam and Ryan were indirectly responsible for an incident of gang violence that took the life of Drew's girlfriend and led him to join the FBI, a source of tension between Liam and Drew. Later, Drew and Alex become romantically involved. After successfully completing their training at Quantico, Alex and her remaining classmates (Shelby, Raina, Nimah, Caleb, Brandon, and Iris) graduate from the academy with offers to work in field offices across the nation.

=== Accused ===
About a year after her arrival at Quantico and several months after the successful completion of her training, Alex is living in New York City and is preparing to work the security detail for the upcoming Democratic National Convention. On the morning of the convention, Alex awakes in the ruins of Grand Central Terminal, and discovers it was destroyed several hours earlier with high-grade explosives. Alex is taken into custody and learns that she is being charged with the terrorist attack on Grand Central. Alex's initial escape is orchestrated by Deputy Director Miranda Shaw (Aunjanue Ellis), her primary instructor at Quantico, who refuses to believe that she is responsible.

Alex is able to prove her innocence in the Grand Central Terminal bombing case with the help of her classmates at Quantico as well as from the rogue hacking group dubbed "The Unknown". Later, it is revealed that the suspected bomber was former FBI analyst-trainee Elias Harper (Rick Cosnett), who had planted the bomb under the instruction of a terrorist mastermind. Having cleared her name in a congressional hearing, Alex is reinstated as an FBI agent and assigned to the field office in New York City, specifically the operations section, and now strives to uncover the true mastermind behind the bombings as the 2016 Presidential election draws ever closer. Prior to the election day, the terrorist kills Natalie Vasquez and Drew Perales to force Alex into doing his bidding. At the end of the first season, Liam is revealed to be the traitor, with Alex and Ryan killing him in the finale. After the bombings, the ensuing publicity, and Simon Asher's death, Alex is fired from the FBI. Two months after the presidential election, Alex is approached by Matthew Keyes (Henry Czerny), the director of the CIA, who extends an offer for her to join and work for the organization.

=== Working for the CIA ===
In the second season, Parrish, who appears to have been fired from the FBI, is working a desk job as an analyst at the CIA while living with Shelby and continuing her relationship with Ryan, who later becomes her fiancé. Flashbacks reveal that she is working undercover for the FBI as a CIA recruit. She is tasked with uncovering a rogue faction of the CIA called the AIC. At The Farm, she is joined with other recruits, including Harry Doyle (Russell Tovey), Dayana Mampasi (Pearl Thusi), Sebastian Chen (David Lim), León Velez (Aarón Díaz), Leigh Davis (Heléne Yorke), and Jeremy Miller (David Call). Ryan later joins the other recruits at the site, much to Alex's surprise. Some time after her recruitment, Alex has a meeting with Matthew Keyes and Miranda Shaw. It is revealed that she was recruited by the CIA as part of a covert mission to establish any potential threats within the agency. Ryan is also recruited by the agency for the same mission. Owen Hall (Blair Underwood) is confirmed to be the primary CIA instructor for the training site at The Farm. In addition, Lydia Hall (Tracy Ifeachor) is later revealed to be another trainer on-site. Alex and the other recruits undergo a series of training assessments in order to become future case officers. After being kicked out of The Farm by Lydia, Alex goes back to working as an analyst. In addition, she breaks off her engagement with Ryan some time before the 2018 G-20 hostage crisis in New York.

=== Hostage crisis ===
During a hostage crisis at the 2018 G-20 summit in New York, Alex witnesses the execution of the First Lady before disguising herself as a member of the Citizens Liberation Front. She attempts to gain information about the terrorist group that was involved in orchestrating the crisis. Prior to escaping the financial district area, she manages to expose the conspirators within the FBI and CIA that are deeply connected to the Citizens Liberation Front as well as the AIC. The AIC is later revealed to be a rogue intelligence group within the CIA that had the backing of a shadow cabal syndicate to push a certain nefarious agenda.

=== Re-instated ===
Two weeks after the end of the hostage crisis, President Claire Haas (Marcia Cross) and CIA director Matthew Keyes put forth a covert joint task force between the FBI and CIA. President Haas mentions that there were eight collaborators within the shadowy cabal group who are secretly involved with the AIC. As a result of Lydia's actions, the collaborators gained access to sensitive U.S. intelligence. This information was vital to their goal of controlling certain areas within the government. As a response, the task force is assigned to uncover the conspiracy and expose the involvement of the collaborators in orchestrating the hostage crisis. Alex is hired to be a member of the task force along with Ryan Booth, Nimah Amin, Shelby Wyatt, and Dayana Mampasi. The leader of the group is Clay Haas (Hunter Parrish), a renowned political advisory strategist. Prior to the formation of the task force, Alex is re-instated as an FBI agent.

The team members are assigned missions to uncover the identities of the collaborators. They fail to achieve their goal after the media reports on the unsanctioned activities of the task force. Following the publicized accounts of the task force in the broadcast media, the Speaker of the House, Henry Roarke (Dennis Boutsikaris) takes the opportunity to criticize Claire's presidency and calls for her impeachment. After Haas resigns from her presidency as a result of the scandal, it is revealed that Roarke has succeeded in being appointed as the President of the United States. Shortly after his inauguration, he requests a new Constitutional Convention in order to rewrite the United States Constitution.

In the days leading to the Constitutional Convention, Alex and the rest of the task force try to stop Roarke from getting the votes needed to allow the convention to take place. After their initial plan fails, they resort to a final strategy. At the convention in Philadelphia, Alex publicly broadcasts Roarke's recordings with the Federal Security Service and emails the evidence to the ACLU and other rights organizations, before having Miranda fake her death by shooting her at the event. Roarke, not willing to face the press or the police, commits suicide.

=== Fugitive ===
Due to Alex committing treason by releasing classified U.S. intelligence to the public at the Constitutional Convention, she is branded as a fugitive of the United States. Sitting together in a car, Owen mentions to Alex that she needs to maintain her cover so as to evade capture from domestic and international law enforcement agencies as a result of being issued an Interpol Red Notice for her arrest. Along with Ryan, she leaves the country on a plane to Thailand.

=== Joining the FBI blacks ops team ===
After living in Thailand for sometime, Alex leaves Ryan without notice and heads to Montepulciano, Italy. Presumably, Ryan returns to the United States after Alex's disappearance. For three years, Alex stayed with a vineyard worker named Andrea (Andrea Bosca) and his daughter, Isabella. On a particular night, Alex encountered associates of a mysterious arms dealer known as The Widow, who successfully located her. After disarming the assailants, Alex attempted to escape to Zurich, Switzerland, in order to rendezvous with Ryan. During their conversation, Ryan mentioned that the associates of The Widow kidnapped Shelby Wyatt. Soon afterwards, they chart a plane back to the United States. Moments after their arrival, Alex encounters Owen Hall, who left his position at the CIA for a position at the Bureau as deputy director of the FBI. Soon afterwards, Owen with the help of Alex and Ryan, successfully recruits Harry Doyle and Jocelyn Turner (Marlee Matlin) to the team, in order to rescue Shelby and take down The Widow. After succeeding in saving Shelby, Owen offers Alex an opportunity to join a covert black ops team to help out the United States government and states that she is fully pardoned for her past crimes after the success of their operation in retrieving Shelby.

=== Pregnancy ===
After traveling back to the United States, Alex tries to prioritize the welfare of her romantic partner Andrea along with his daughter Isabella, over the course of the third, and final season. During a mission, Shelby has Ryan return her jacket to her duffel bag, but Ryan, unknowingly, opens Alex's duffel and notices a pregnancy text box on the top of her belongings. He goes to Shelby and asks her about the pregnancy test in her bag, but she says that she doesn't have one and didn't know about there being one. They both look at one another when their question is later answered, as Alex walks into the diner car of the train. Later, Shelby confronts Alex about the test, and Alex admits that it is hers, and Shelby realizes that Alex is scared to take it. Alex says that she isn't scared for herself, but for Andrea, for she fears that if the test is positive, she will have to tell him and put Andrea and Isabella into danger all over again.

Sometime later, Alex starts to take a pregnancy test, with the test result later being confirmed as positive. During another mission, Alex attends an AA meeting, to investigate a middleman connected to Garrett King, a persona non-grata to the U.S., who is planning on an assassination attempt of a North Korean defector with good intel that could prove useful for the U.S. government. She later uncovers the fact that David Quintana, her AA sponsor, works under Garrett, and discovers that he received orders to assassinate the defector Jun Ho Park. After some conversation going back and forth between King and Alex, King realizes that Alex is wearing a wire, and tries to kill her. She almost drowns and dies, and is taken to the hospital, and while in the ambulance, Shelby makes note to the doctors and Jocelyn that Alex is about 10 weeks pregnant. She ends up losing the baby, as she had too much water in her lungs, and her and the baby were deprived of oxygen. Later, Alex is consoled by Shelby.

In her most recent mission, Alex tries to locate Andrea and Isabella, who were taken by Conor Devlin (Timothy V. Murphy), an Irish criminal going after Ryan, who killed his son. Isabella was taken by Devlin, who wanted to trade her for Ryan instead. Before the trade happened in Ireland, Andrea and Alex have a conversation about Alex's lies and the fact that she really loves him and Isabella. Andrea says that if she ever had a child of her own, she would understand. They talked about him wanting, and needing to go after Isabella and being there for her. She started to say something, most likely about her past pregnancy, but was cut off by Mike McQuigg (Alan Powell), offering Andrea coffee as a peace offering. She never got to say anything about the pregnancy to Andrea before he was shot and killed by Devlin.

== Development ==
=== Creation and casting ===
Joshua Safran had initially envisioned Alex as one of the protagonists of Quantico. When he was writing the character, his personal struggle with not knowing whether one of his family members was a pathological liar or involved with a government agency helped Safran build Alex's perception of her own family. Safran wrote his own experience into Alex's struggle to learn the truth about her father. He said "I've always struggled with knowing that I would never know the truth, because there is no real such thing as the truth with regard to somebody who may or may not be telling the truth. That struggle informed the character of Alex."

Priyanka Chopra was cast in the role in February 2015, which was the result of a talent holding deal between Chopra and ABC Studios. The deal required ABC studios to either develop a project starring her or cast her in an existing show for the 2015 network television season. For quite some time, the casting executive at ABC, Keli Lee, had been trying to convince Chopra to do television in the United States, something that Chopra was not sure of. However, when Chopra was first considering the possibility of doing a television series in America, Lee learned that another studio was also trying to sign her, to which she reacted by saying, "No, you can't make this deal elsewhere. You're coming here. And I'm flying to India." Later, Lee traveled to India and was finally able to convince her to accept the offer. In an interview with Vanity Fair, Chopra revealed the only condition she put forward to Lee for doing a show was that she wanted them to find her a series that would put her in the same position that she currently enjoyed in India. She said "There were TV shows and movies that were offered [to me] before this one as well. But I wanted a part that put me on the same platform as [I had in] India. I wanted to play a leading part. I didn't want to settle for anything less."

She walked into the room, and it was like the molecules shifted in that way that superstars have. I was very confused because I didn't know who she was, but we all sat up straighter. We're like this is clearly a movie star; it's like every hair on the back of your neck stands up watching her act. When I went back home I couldn't think about anyone else. It wasn't even like I was thinking Priyanka has to play this, she had actually re-envisioned the character from my eyes.

— Safran on his first meeting with Chopra.

Chopra saw the deal as an opportunity to represent South Asians and break Indian stereotypes in Hollywood and the United States in general. In the process, she became the first South Asian to headline an American network drama series. She revealed that when she was in school [in America], she never saw anyone on television who looked like her, and she found it really weird because she thought there were so many people of South Asian descent in America and in other parts of the world. She also revealed that she did not want to be a stereotype of what Indians were usually seen as in global pop culture, saying that Indians never talk like Apu from The Simpsons. After signing the deal and being given all the 26 pilot scripts that ABC was developing for the 2015–2016 television season, Chopra chose Quantico. Having appeared in over fifty films at that time, the series was also Chopra's first ever audition, which she found very new and nerve-wracking at the same time.

Following Chopra's casting, the series underwent a significant change. Safran had initially intended to make the show as an ensemble drama with no obvious lead, but after Chopra's casting, Alex became the main character and the show was re-structured around her. The character was initially written to be white, which was also re-written, keeping Chopra in mind. The background of the character was tweaked by making her half-Indian, with an additional backstory of Alex having spent ten years in Mumbai, India. Apart from changing her ethnicity, Safran completely re-envisioned the character. For example, Alex was initially written as "jaded and brooding" but was re-written as "fun and warm". Earlier, the series was supposed to focus on the character's dark side because Safran had never imagined Alex having a positive side, which changed after Chopra stepped in the role. Safran said, "Priyanka came in and played all of that but as a character who was always in control. And still warm and vibrant because she knew no one was going to get through her walls. From that point on, Alex was the kind of character who can have humor, who can have heart."

=== Characterization ===
The series is told from Alex's point of view. The American Broadcasting Company describes her as a "fiercely competitive and naturally gifted" person, who can read people instantly which makes it hard for her to trust anyone, making her relationships short lived. At the 2015 Television Critics Associations Summer Press Tour, Chopra said that she chose the series as her first television project because of the character's appeal, comparing her to "the female Jason Bourne". Chopra chose to depict the character as tough but also feminine, saying "She's as smart as that, but she is also vulnerable and soft. I didn't want to make Alex extremely macho, I wanted to celebrate femininity. You can be an absolute woman and also be smart and tough and not lose your femininity."

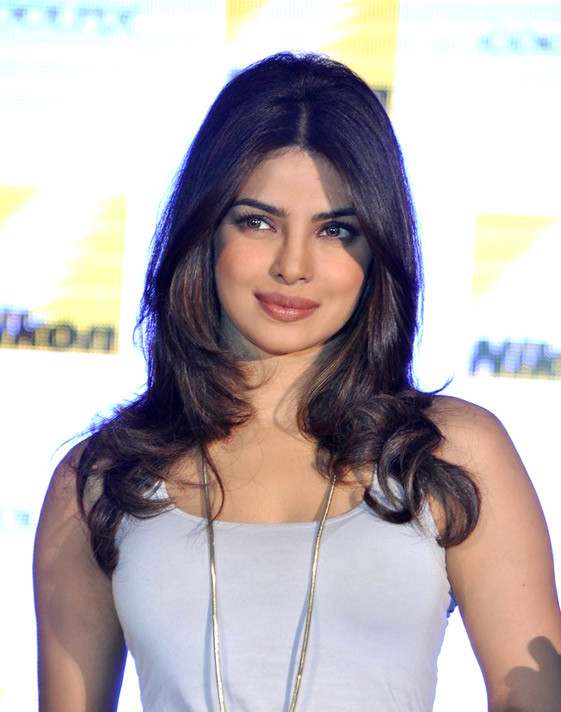
Alex was initially written as a white character and was re-written with Priyanka Chopra in mind.

Screen Rant wrote of the character: "Rather than beginning the series in a state of potential heroism, Alex begins the series as a potential villain. And yet, Alex is still a hero. Everything that follows is a desperate attempt at survival and at remaining one step ahead of those who are trying to harm her. In fact, Alex's narrative is one in which she is nearly immediately immersed in adventure and thrown headfirst into chaos." The character is also opinionated and outspoken. Chopra said "Alex is someone with a point of a view and she's a woman with an opinion and at the same time she's not afraid of being who she is. The modern woman today is different and Alex is definitely bold and expressive and she identifies herself as a human being of today, not a man or a woman. She's empowered and she's confident."

Alex has been depicted as someone who is not afraid of expressing her sexuality, and as a flawed human being who takes charge of her own life. Chopra told Cosmopolitan: "It's empowering in that way, which doesn't say that sexual freedom is what empowerment needs to necessarily be. It's extremely individual to each one of us. As for Alex, she happens to not care." The character treats men as dispensable entities, similar to how men usually treat women. She does not treat men as if they are the most important thing in her life because she is more focused on her work, with men just happen to come and go in her life. Chopra explained "I think that's extremely empowering on her end. It may not be something I personally agree with or something I do, but I think different people have different individual choices that they make."

Alex's friendships with her fellow trainees also form the crux of the character as well as the series, especially her friendship with her roommate and best friend Shelby. Johanna Braddy, who plays Shelby, told TV Guide that Shelby's friendship with Alex is a big part of Quantico. Safran talked to Entertainment Weekly that the idea for their friendship came from the similarity between the characters. He said "So for Alex and Shelby, you know, as roommates and as friends, we just really loved the idea of these two people from two different parts of the world, all these things that don't touch upon each other, but they actually at their core are both very driven, successful, smart, and kind humans that find each other." One of the other characters Alex is very close to, other than Shelby, was Simon, who is killed in the finale. Talking about losing a friend and its repercussions on the Season 2, Chopra explained: "She's extremely affected [but] doesn't believe in sharing her emotions or opening up with someone."

As the show progresses, Alex and Ryan's romance evolves into a relationship. When Alex confesses that her only motive to join the academy was to find out the truth about her father and was about to leave, Ryan makes her realize that she is meant to be an agent. Alex's on-again off-again relationship with Ryan has been described by Chopra as star-crossed. She said "Alex and Ryan are star-crossed lovers. You love them and they fight and have this intense passionate bond. But Alex is also a little self-destructive. She's a solitary person and she's not vulnerable enough, whereas Ryan really is. She's a little rough around the edges and whatever's happened in the past, she has trust issues. So that leads to issues in their relationship." Fans have dubbed Alex and Ryan "Ralex". On being asked about the possibility of having to choose between Ryan and saving the world, Chopra said "I'm pretty sure she'd pick saving the world, because she's that kind of person."

== Reception ==
The character of Alex Parrish received positive reviews and Chopra was praised for her portrayal. Describing the character as cool, charismatic, and complex, Sonia Saraiya of Salon said that Alex Parrish is the Indian-American heroine she had been waiting for. James Poniewozik of The New York Times described Chopra as the "strongest human asset" of the show, adding that "she is immediately charismatic and commanding." Buddy TV praised Alex's characterization, calling her "Bold and Sassy" and writing, "She's daring enough to hook up with a guy she just met in an airplane and sassy enough to call him out later in front of everyone when he pretends he just met her." The A.V. Club wrote, "Chopra is one of those performers who reduces you to the language of an old-Hollywood agent type. She's just got that thing. She's got zazz. She pops on screen. Chopra is not just gorgeous, she's naturally charismatic." An article published by SheKnows Media noted that although the show has many fascinating young characters, Alex in particular "sits at the center".

Alex Parrish has been a part of an unconventional hero's journey. She's flipping the typical narrative on its head and re-ordering the steps. In spite of the fact that her journey is not one that perfectly parallels the stereotypical hero's journey, Alex constantly believes in others and fights for justice. She is self-sacrificing and kind, genuinely caring about those around her. She's vulnerable and unapologetic in expressing her emotions.

— Screen Rant on the character's analysis.

Rob Lowman of Los Angeles Daily News was impressed with Chopra's performance, calling her "charismatic" and writing, "I was immediately struck by her dynamic screen presence. Chopra is someone worth keeping an eye on." Emily Canal of Forbes called Quantico "One Of The Most Feminist Shows" of the season, praising its female characters and writing, "Quantico not only highlights a handful of diverse women, but gives them more than just love interests to drive the plot. They're forceful, have storylines that propel their narrative and dialog that doesn't shy away from the double standards and hardships women face in reality." She also noted the fact that Alex takes control of her sexuality and decisions, saying, "What was set up as an uncomfortable situation where Booth was in charge, swiveled into a scenario that gave Parish the reins." TheWrap's Tim Grierson wrote, "Chopra has a poise and sexual spark as Alex that suggests a formidable potential FBI agent whose mind and beauty are equally stunning."

In 2015 BuddyTV ranked Alex Parrish number one on the list of "12 Breakout Characters of the Fall 2015 TV Season", writing, "Chopra shines in her starring role. Alex is a heroine to stand alongside ABC's other female leads like Meredith Grey, Annalise Keating, and Olivia Pope." It also declared Chopra's portrayal of Alex Parrish as the 2015 Sexiest Woman on Television. Entertainment Weekly adjudged Alex the 2015's number one "Butt-Kicking Woman in Movies/TV". TheTV Insider declared Alex as one of the Kick-Ass Women on Primetime television. In 2016 Screen Rant listed her seventh on the list of "12 Female TV Characters Redefining the Hero's Journey". The same year, InStyle ranked Alex as one of "The 16 Most Inspiring Female Characters on TV" and BuddTV named her one of the ten "Sexiest Female TV Characters".

Chopra has also received a number of accolades for her performance. At the 42nd People's Choice Awards, Chopra won a People's Choice Award for Favorite Actress in a New TV Series for the role, becoming the first South Asian Actress to win a People's Choice Award. She also received a Teen Choice Awards for Choice TV : Breakout Star nomination at the 2016 Teen Choice Awards. She won a second People's Choice Award at the 2017 ceremony, this time for Favorite Dramatic TV Actress.
