= S.W.A.T. (2017 TV series) =

American action crime drama television series

- Genre: Action thriller; Crime drama; Police procedural
- Based on: S.W.A.T. by: Robert Hamner; Rick Husky
- Developed by: Aaron Rahsaan Thomas; Shawn Ryan
- Starring: Shemar Moore; Stephanie Sigman; Alex Russell; Lina Esco; Kenny Johnson; Peter Onorati; Jay Harrington; David Lim; Patrick St. Esprit; Amy Farrington; Rochelle Aytes; Anna Enger Ritch; Niko Pepaj; Annie Ilonzeh
- Composer: Robert Duncan
- Country of origin: United States
- Original language: English
- No. of seasons: 8
- No. of episodes: 163 (list of episodes)

Production
- Executive producers: Shawn Ryan; Neal H. Moritz; Aaron Rahsaan Thomas; Marney Hochman; Danielle Woodrow; Pavun Shetty; Justin Lin; Paul Bernard
- Producers: Nicolas Bradley; Shemar Moore
- Camera setup: Single-camera
- Running time: 44 minutes
- Production companies: MiddKid Productions; Kansas ART Productions (seasons 1–4); Original Film; Perfect Storm Entertainment; CBS Studios (Note: Credited as CBS Television Studios from seasons 1 through 3.); Sony Pictures Television (Note: Credited as Sony Pictures Television Studios from seasons 4 through 6.)

Original release
- Network: CBS
- Release: November 2, 2017 – May 16, 2025

Related
- S.W.A.T. (1975 TV series); S.W.A.T. Exiles

S.W.A.T. is an American action drama television series based on the 1975–76 television series of the same name. Aaron Rahsaan Thomas and Shawn Ryan developed the new series, which premiered on CBS on November 2, 2017, and is produced by Original Film, CBS Studios and Sony Pictures Television (the latter is a successor to the producer of the original 1975 series, Spelling-Goldberg Productions). The series stars Shemar Moore with an ensemble cast and follows Sergeant Daniel "Hondo" Harrelson (Moore) and Twenty Squad, a police Special Weapons and Tactics (SWAT) team operating in Los Angeles, California.

The series was partially inspired by real-life experiences shared by police officers. It also draws inspiration from both the original 1975 series and the 2003 film adaptation, with the 2017 reboot maintaining a similar premise and reintroducing several characters from the 2003 film. S.W.A.T. exists in a shared television universe with Ryan's FX crime drama The Shield, solidified by an appearance from the character Detective Steve Billings (played by David Marciano) from The Shield.

The series received three Primetime Emmy Award nominations. In May 2023, the series was canceled after six seasons at CBS, only to be renewed for a seventh and final season at CBS a few days later. The seventh season premiered on February 16, 2024. In April 2024, the final season decision was reversed and the show was renewed for an eighth season. The eighth season premiered on October 18, 2024, and the series was cancelled for the final time in March 2025, with the series finale airing on May 16, 2025.

== Premise ==
The series centers on Los Angeles Police Department Sergeant Daniel "Hondo" Harrelson and Twenty Squad. A lifelong Los Angeles local and former Marine, Hondo has been tapped to lead a new "last stop" Special Weapons and Tactics unit of the LAPD. Hondo was raised in South L.A. and is loyal to both his "brothers in blue" and to the people they serve. Deadline's review of the series described Hondo as being "put in charge of a team of cop-show-standard misfits to soothe political tensions after an African-American teenager is shot by Hondo's white predecessor."

== Cast and characters ==
- Shemar Moore as Sergeant II Daniel "Hondo" Harrelson Jr., a Los Angeles native promoted to team leader in an attempt to ease tensions between the community and the LAPD after his former team leader shot an unarmed black teenager. He was demoted at the end of season 4 after leaking information of racism in the LAPD to the press before later regaining command early in season 5. As team leader, his callsign was 20-David but it changed to 27-David during his demotion. He's familiar with many members of the community and treats them with respect; because of this they usually give him information pertinent to his cases. He was briefly in a clandestine relationship with Jessica Cortez, but they were forced to break it off to protect their careers despite both expressing their love for each other. He later dated Nia Wells, an Assistant District Attorney, their relationship ended when Hondo was unable to keep his emotions in check while dealing with a man who tried to hurt his sister. He eventually went on to date Nichelle after crossing paths during a pursuit where they help an injured civilian together. At the end of the fifth season, Hondo learns that Nichelle is pregnant with their first child. She gives birth to their daughter Vivienne in the sixth season and the two marry in-between seasons six and seven.
- Stephanie Sigman as Captain Jessica Cortez (seasons 1–2), Commanding Officer of the LAPD Metropolitan Division and Hondo's lover, and then former lover. She is a respected officer who has plans to improve the relationship between the LAPD and the citizens of Los Angeles, despite some resistance from the rank and file. In the second-season finale, she accepts an offer for an FBI assignment and leaves the LAPD to go undercover. By the start of the third season, she has seemingly taken the assignment permanently, with the actress being confirmed as having exited the show.
- Jay Harrington as Sergeant II David "Deacon" Kay, a ten-year veteran of the S.W.A.T. team who was passed over for promotion in favor of Hondo in the aftermath of the Raymont Harris shooting. Although he takes the decision in stride, he later admits to Hondo he was resentful about being passed over, but made peace with it once he saw what an effective leader Hondo was. His callsign is 30-David. He acts as second in command of the team and serves as a mentor to his teammates and in the LAPD SWAT academy. He is fiercely dedicated to his job with SWAT and was awarded the LAPD Police Star at the end of Season 2. He is fiercely loyal to his team, particularly Hondo, all of whom he considers family. Deacon is 20-Squad's temporary leader in Hondo's absence, giving orders at SWAT HQ and in the field. His dedication extends to his wife Annie (Bre Blair) and their three children: Matthew, Lila and Samuel. In "School," it is revealed that his daughter, Lila, is named after a school shooting victim. Midway into Season 2, Annie gives birth to another daughter, Victoria. In Season 3, he takes on a second job working for a private security firm. In Season 7, Deacon starts to see his work life conflict with his family life, leading him and Annie to have disagreements over when he is needed most. After some soul-searching and advice from Hondo and Hicks, Deacon makes the tough decision to retire in order to spend more time with his family and allow Annie to pursue her dreams of becoming an attorney. However, he soon re-evaluates his decision following Luca's shooting and subsequent retirement, he eventually reverses his choice after Annie's sister moves in to help with the children.
- Alex Russell as Officer III James "Jim" Street (seasons 1–6; recurring season 7), a new transfer from the Long Beach Police Department. His call sign is 26-David. His mother Karen (Sherilyn Fenn) was in prison for murdering her abusive husband/Street's father; she was arrested by former S.W.A.T Team Leader Buck Spivey. He initially has trouble adjusting to being part of the team due to his impulsiveness and priority of his mother over his job, which eventually got him removed from SWAT. He managed to earn his way back on the team. He continues to have a strained relationship with his mother until her death in the fifth season. Throughout the show he has romantic tension with his teammate Chris Alonso, this romance is reciprocated not long before Chris leaves the team. In the Season 7 episode, "End of the Road", after helping the team stop a group of criminals, Street transferred back to LBPD to join Long Beach's SWAT team, becoming its new commanding officer after its previous leader died. It is revealed Street is engaged to Chris.
- Lina Esco as Officer III Christina "Chris" Alonso (seasons 1–5), a former canine officer and (originally) one of the two female cops assigned to S.W.A.T. Her callsign is 24-David. She serves as the Squad's sniper and becomes close friends with Street. Chris is openly bisexual, briefly engaging in a polyamorous relationship. Chris is the godmother to Deacon's daughter, Victoria. At the end of the fifth season, after starting a relationship with Street, she leaves SWAT and the LAPD to take over the duty of helping and housing illegal immigrant girls seeking asylum in the United States. Esco confirmed her departure from the series in order to pursue other job opportunities. But even after, Chris is still mentioned multiple times in season six, including being engaged to Street.
- Kenny Johnson as Officer III+1 Dominique Luca (seasons 1–6; recurring season 7), a third-generation S.W.A.T officer. His callsign is 22-David. He was originally the driver and mechanic of the team's vehicle "Black Betty" until an injury placed him in a tactical support role until he was allowed to be in the field again. Johnson previously appeared on The Shield, also created by Shawn Ryan. He discovers in the sixth season that officer Eva Durrant is his half-sister. In the last few minutes of the Season 7 episode, "Escape", while responding to a call concerning a robbery, Luca is shot. In "Last Call", Luca is revealed to have survived the shooting; however, he has suffered permanent damage to his hand and arm. Not wanting to be confined to a desk, Luca decides to retire from all policing duties.
- Peter Onorati as Sergeant II Jack Mumford (season 1; recurring season 2; guest seasons 4 and 7), the team leader of another S.W.A.T. team alongside Hondo's. His callsign was 50-David. He has been divorced three times; in "Payback," he gets engaged again. In the conclusion of the second season episode "Jack," he announces his retirement from SWAT and the LAPD after being shot earlier in the episode, and makes his retirement official two episodes later. In the fourth season episode "Positive Thinking," Mumford returns to work a 15-year-old cold case.
- David Lim as Officer III Victor Tan, a former officer with the LAPD Vice Squad. His callsign is 25-David. He joined S.W.A.T. three years prior to the series. Once on track for a prestigious career at the insistence of his parents, Tan instead decided to pursue his own path in life and chose to become a police officer instead. He is knowledgeable in the drug trade of Los Angeles from his time on Vice. In the season four finale, he marries his longtime girlfriend, Bonnie. They later split up halfway through the sixth season after Tan learns she had been cheating on him.
- Patrick St. Esprit as Commander Robert Hicks (seasons 2–8; recurring season 1), a senior officer with the LAPD Special Operations Bureau. He is a widower and a longtime friend of the Kay family. He has two grown children; a daughter named Molly and a son named J.P. St. Esprit was promoted to a series regular for season 2.
- Amy Farrington as Lieutenant Detective Piper Lynch (season 3; recurring season 4), an experienced detective from LAPD Hollywood Division appointed by the mayor as a tactical consultant to Hondo's team.
- Rochelle Aytes as Nichelle Carmichael (seasons 6–7; recurring seasons 3–5 and 8), a social worker at the local community center and Hondo's on-and-off love interest. As of the end of the fifth season, she is pregnant with her and Hondo's first child. In the sixth season episode "Stockholm," she gives birth to their daughter Vivienne. In the sixth season finale, she married Hondo.
- Anna Enger Ritch as Officer III Zoe Powell (seasons 7–8; recurring seasons 5–6), a new SWAT recruit who debuts during the fifth season and who takes Chris's place on 20-Squad on-and-off following her departure, before eventually joining the team permanently during the seventh season. She initially reminds Street of himself in the beginning due to her lone wolf attitude, recklessness, and disregard for protocol, but eventually opens up and becomes part of the team.
- Niko Pepaj as Officer III Miguel "Miko" Alfaro (season 8; recurring seasons 6–7), a new SWAT recruit who debuts during the sixth season and works with 20-Squad on-and-off until joining them for good at the end of the seventh season. He was formerly from Long Beach and worked with Street on the SWAT team there; the two had a rivalry, which came to a head after Alfaro filed an anonymous complaint against Street. The two ultimately settle their feud after Alfaro transfers to LAPD. Late in the seventh season, Alfaro falls out with Tan, who feels the former is using 20-Squad as a stepping stone to further his own career, though the two settle their difference in the finale.
- Annie Ilonzeh as Officer III Devin Gamble (season 8), a new SWAT recruit who debuts during the eighth season. Once a promising rookie LAPD officer from a family of mostly criminals, Gamble's reputation and prospects were ruined after her father murdered a Sheriff's Deputy. She eventually returns to the LAPD after Hondo personally recruits her to fill the last available slot on his team. She continues to face scrutiny from officers and personnel who hold her responsible for her father's actions and don't believe she belongs on the job.

== Episodes ==
Season	Episodes	Originally released	
Season	Episodes	First released	Last released
1	22	November 2, 2017	May 17, 2018
2	23	September 27, 2018	May 16, 2019
3	21	October 2, 2019	May 20, 2020
4	18	November 11, 2020	May 26, 2021
5	22	October 1, 2021	May 22, 2022
6	22	October 7, 2022	May 19, 2023
7	13	February 16, 2024	May 17, 2024
8	22	October 18, 2024	May 16, 2025

== Production ==
=== Development ===
On February 3, 2017, it was announced that CBS had greenlit production of a pilot episode of a television series inspired by the 2003 film adaptation of the 1970s ABC series S.W.A.T.. The pilot was written by Aaron Rahsaan Thomas and Shawn Ryan and directed by Justin Lin.

The new series was ordered by CBS on May 12, 2017. Co-creators and executive producers Thomas and Ryan would serve as the showrunners. On November 17, 2017, CBS picked up the series for a full season of 20 episodes and on December 1, 2017, CBS ordered two additional episodes for the first season bringing the total to 22 episodes. On March 27, 2018, CBS renewed the series for a second season.

On March 16, 2020, Sony Pictures Television suspended production of the third season due to the COVID-19 pandemic. On May 6, 2020, CBS renewed the series for a fourth season. On April 15, 2021, CBS renewed the series for a fifth season. On April 8, 2022, CBS renewed the series for a sixth season. On May 5, 2023, CBS canceled the series after six seasons. A few days later, CBS reversed its decision and renewed S.W.A.T. for a seventh and final season. On April 11, 2024, CBS reversed its decision of the seventh season being the final season days after announcing a series finale date and renewed the series for an eighth season. On March 6, 2025, it was reported that the show was ending on CBS after eight seasons.

=== Casting ===
In February 2017, Shemar Moore was announced as Daniel "Hondo" Harrelson, alongside new co-stars Kenny Johnson as Dominique Luca, who was originally named Brian Gamble, and Lina Esco as Christina "Chris" Alonso, who also originally named Sanchez. Several additional cast members were announced in March 2017. Jay Harrington plays Officer "Deacon" Kay, Alex Russell is James "Jim" Street, and finally, Peter Onorati was cast as Jack Mumford. On September 21, 2017, David Lim was cast in the role of Hondo's new co-member Victor Tan and was later promoted to series regular status for first season. On October 4, 2019, Stephanie Sigman announced her departure from the show and was subsequently replaced by Amy Farrington as series regular beginning with season three. On January 26, 2024, Anna Enger Ritch was cast in the role of Zoe Powell and has later promoted to series regular status for the seventh season. On July 18, 2024, Niko Pepaj was cast in the role of Miguel Alfaro and later promoted to series regular status for the eighth season.

=== Filming ===
Filming on the fourth season began on August 4, 2020.

== Broadcast and release ==
The series premiered in the United States on CBS on November 2, 2017. The second season premiered on September 27, 2018. The third season premiered on October 2, 2019. The fourth season was originally set to be a mid-season premiere. However, on July 14 it was announced that it would switch places with Survivor, and the fourth season premiered on November 11, 2020. The fifth season premiered on October 1, 2021. The sixth season premiered on October 7, 2022. The seventh season premiered on February 16, 2024. The eighth season premiered on October 18, 2024.

While airing on CBS, the most recent season was available on Paramount+. Previous seasons have been available on Netflix since 2023 after previously being available on Hulu.

Sony Pictures Television distribute the series internationally. In the United Kingdom, it airs on Sunday nights on Sky Max and made its We TV debut on November 12, 2023.

In Southeast Asia, Hong Kong, and Taiwan, the series was aired on Fox Asia from season 1 till 3. Then, it was moved to AXN Asia from season 4 onwards.

== Reception ==
=== Critical response ===
Season One garnered a mixed response from critics, with the review aggregation website Rotten Tomatoes reported a 48% approval rating for the season, with an average rating of 4.6/10 based on 27 reviews. The website's critical consensus reads, "Despite a commanding, charming performance from Shemar Moore, S.W.A.T. remains a simple procedural overrun with clichés." Metacritic, which uses a weighted average, assigned a score of 45 out of 100 based on 12 reviews, indicating "mixed or average reviews".

=== Ratings ===
Viewership and ratings per season of S.W.A.T.
Season	Timeslot (ET)	Episodes	First aired		Last aired		TV season	Viewership rank	Avg. viewers (millions)	Avg. 18–49 rating
Season	Timeslot (ET)	Episodes	Date	Viewers (millions)	Date	Viewers (millions)	TV season	Viewership rank	Avg. viewers (millions)	Avg. 18–49 rating
1	Thursday 10:00 p.m.	22	November 2, 2017	6.74	May 17, 2018	6.03	2017–18	35	9.13	1.7
2	Thursday 10:00 p.m.	23	September 27, 2018	4.70	May 16, 2019	5.75	2018–19	38	8.34	1.5
3	Wednesday 10:00 p.m.	21	October 2, 2019	4.03	May 20, 2020	4.82	2019–20	46	7.27	1.2
4	Wednesday 10:00 p.m.	18	November 11, 2020	2.75	May 26, 2021	3.17	2020–21	42	5.96	1.3
5	Friday 8:00 p.m. (1–8); Sunday 10:00 p.m. (9, 11–22); Sunday 10:30 p.m. (10)	22	October 1, 2021	4.86	May 22, 2022	3.36	2021–22	35	6.41	0.8
6	Friday 8:00 p.m.	22	October 7, 2022	4.76	May 19, 2023	4.65	2022–23	28	6.41	0.6
7	Friday 8:00 p.m. (1–4, 6–13); Friday 9:00 p.m. (5)	13	February 16, 2024	5.24	May 17, 2024	4.39	2023–24	27	6.14	0.5
8	Friday 8:00 p.m. (1–8); Friday 10:00 p.m. (9–18, 22); Friday 9:00 p.m. (19–21)	22	October 18, 2024	4.05	May 16, 2025	3.02	2024–25	TBD	TBD	TBD

=== Accolades ===
Year	Award	Category	Nominee	Result	Ref.
2018	National Film and Television Awards, USA	Best Actor in a TV Series	Shemar Moore	Nominated	
2019	Primetime Emmy Awards	Outstanding Stunt Coordination for a Drama Series, Limited Series or Movie	Charlie Brewer (stunt coordinator)	Nominated	
2019	Young Entertainer Awards	Best Guest Starring Young Actor 10-12 - Television Series	Evan Myles Horsley	Nominated	
2020	Primetime Emmy Awards	Outstanding Stunt Coordination for a Drama Series, Limited Series or Movie	Charlie Brewer & Austen Brewer	Nominated	
2021	Primetime Emmy Awards	Outstanding Stunt Coordination	Charlie Brewer & Austen Brewer	Nominated	
2021	Critics Choice Super Awards	Best Action Series		Nominated	
2021	Critics Choice Super Awards	Best Actor in an Action Series	Shemar Moore	Nominated	

== Sequel spin-off ==
In May 2025, it was reported that Sony Pictures Television would be producing a sequel/spin-off of the series to be titled S.W.A.T. Exiles with Shemar Moore set to reprise his role of Hondo and production to commence in the summer of 2025 in Los Angeles utilizing the entire crew of the original series, though without any confirmed network or streaming platform. The announcement of the spin-off and Moore himself received mixed reception due to none of the other regular cast returning with both Harrington and Lim confirming they were not involved in discussions on the spin-off and not made aware of it until a day before its public announcement. SPT President, Katherine Pope, announced there was a possibility for other cast members from the original series to return in the spin-off, but did not give detail as to who or in what capacity.

S.W.A.T. Exiles premiered on Starz on September 25, 2026.

== See also ==
- Flashpoint―Similar concept but focuses on a fictional elite tactical unit in Canada.
- S.W.A.T.—2003 movie also based on the original TV series.
