= Sharbari Zohra Ahmed =

Bangladeshi American writer

- Born: April 5, 1971 (age 55); Dhaka, Bangladesh
- Education: New York University
- Occupations: Writer; professor
- Notable work: Quantico

Sharbari Zohra Ahmed (born April 5, 1971) is a Bangladeshi American writer. She is known for being a writer on the ABC thriller Quantico, which made her one of the first Bangladeshi women to write for American network television. Ahmed has also published a book, fictional stories, and plays. Additionally, Ahmed is a professor at Manhatanville College's MFA program and Fairfield University. Her family fled Bangladesh when she was three weeks old due to the Bangladesh Liberation War.

== Early life ==
Sharbari Zohra Ahmed was born in Dhaka, Bangladesh on April 5, 1971. Her family fled Bangladesh when she was three weeks old due to the Bangladesh Liberation War, during which her father was targeted for execution by the Pakistani Army. She went to New York University for her master's degree in creative writing. She lived in Ethiopia for a while, her story "Pepsi" is set in Ethiopia and is about a daughter of a Bangladeshi diplomat trying to fit in the country.

== Career ==
Ahmed was on the writing team for the first season of the ABC show Quantico, making her the first woman of Bangladeshi origin to write for a network show.

She wrote a play, Raisins Not Virgins, which was adapted into a short film. Raisins Not Virgins was about being a young female American Muslim trying to make sense of her Islamic identity. She wrote the play in 2003 and adapted it for the stage. She produced the play and acted in it. In 2008, it was selected for the Tribeca All Access programme.

Her book, The Ocean of Mrs. Nagai, was released at the Hay Festival Dhaka in 2013. She is on the faculty of the MFA program at Manhattanville College. She defended Indian actor, Soha Ali Khan, after she was criticized by Muslim extremists for wearing a sari, which the extremist deemed un-Islamic. She presented in the AWP conference on postcolonial literature in Bangladesh in 2016. She is working on a new project called The Line with Ikhtisad Ahmed. Her fiction has appeared in numerous journals and anthologies including The Gettysburg Review, Painted Bride Quarterly and the Asian Pacific American Journal.

In 2017, she adapted Rickshaw Girl by Mitali Bose Perkins (Scholastic) for the screen. The film is produced by Sleeperwave Films and directed by Amitabh Reza Chowdhury.

In 2023, Ahmed worked as a producer on the limited-series adaptation of Nadeem Zaman's The Inheritors, which is a modern retelling of The Great Gatsby set in Dhaka.

== Bibliography ==
- The Ocean of Mrs. Nagai
- The New Anthem: A Subcontinent in its Own Words
- Lifelines
