= David Lim (actor) =

American actor and model (born 1983)

- Born: David Bradley Lim; September 23, 1983 (age 43); Oakland, California, U.S.
- Education: UC San Diego
- Occupations: Actor, model
- Years active: 2009–present
- Spouse: Marketa Kazdova (m. 2019)
- Website: davidblim.com

David Bradley Lim (born September 23, 1983) is an American actor and model. He is best known for portraying the role of Sebastian Chen in the second season of the ABC thriller Quantico (2016–2017) and as Victor Tan in the CBS television series S.W.A.T (2017–2025).

== Early life and education ==
Lim was born on September 23, 1983, in Oakland, California, USA. He is an American born of Chinese descent. He graduated from De La Salle High School at Concord in 2001. In 2005, Lim earned a bachelor of science degree in Electrical Engineering from the University of California, San Diego.

== Career ==
Lim started his entertainment career as a model. In 2009, Lim signed a contract with Ford Models, and moved to Los Angeles shortly after to pursue modelling and acting.

In 2016, Lim was cast in the recurring role of CIA recruit Sebastian Chen on the second season of ABC thriller Quantico.

On April 13, 2017, Lim joined the cast of the CBS television series, S.W.A.T. Lim starred in the role of S.W.A.T officer Victor Tan. On September 21, 2017, Lim was promoted to a series regular role, ahead of the premiere of the show, and remained a series regular for all eight seasons of the show.

== Personal life ==
Lim's wife is Marketa Kazdova, a model.

== Filmography ==
=== Film ===
- The Five Birds of Texas, California (2014), Walt
- 5th Passenger (2017), Li

=== Television ===
Year	Title	Role	Notes
2011	The Young and the Restless	Camera Guy	1 episode
2012	Hollywood Heights	Smith	Recurring role
2012	Castle	Agent Trahn	Episode: "Linchpin"
2012	Treelore Theatre	Wen	Episode: "Bus Stop: Wen"
2012	Soap in the City	Sato	TV movie
2013	90210	Prince Harry	Episode: "Scandal Royale"
2013	Beautiful Fools	George	Episodes: "Aristophanes" and "Blue Ruin (Peter)"
2013	Revenge	Fireman #2	Episode: "Truth Part 2"
2014	Agents of S.H.I.E.L.D.	Waiter	Episode: "The Magical Place"
2015	Supergirl	Agent Tsung	Episode: "Human for a Day"
2016	Criminal Minds	Kevin Bruner	Episode: "Drive"
2016–2017	Quantico	Sebastian Chen	Recurring role 15 episodes
2017–2025	S.W.A.T	Officer III Victor Tan	Series regular
2026	S.W.A.T. Exiles	Officer III Victor Tan	1 episode
