= Jay Armstrong Johnson =

American actor, singer, and dancer (born 1987)

- Johnson in 2026
- Born: September 1, 1987 (age 39); Fort Worth, Texas, US
- Education: New York University – Steinhardt
- Occupation: Actor
- Years active: 2007–present
- Website: jayarmstrongjohnson.org

Jay Armstrong Johnson (born September 1, 1987) is an American actor, singer, and dancer, known for starring roles on Broadway in musicals like Parade, On the Town, and The Phantom of the Opera and for his portrayal of Will Olsen in the ABC television series Quantico.

== Early life ==
Johnson was born on September 1, 1987, in Fort Worth, Texas. At the age of thirteen, he made his professional debut in the touring production of Cathy Rigby's Peter Pan. Johnson attended New York University's Steinhardt School of Music, where he appeared in a 2008 production of composer Adam Guettel and librettist Tina Landau's musical Floyd Collins, working directly with the composer. Johnson departed NYU before his senior year to play the role of Mark in the national tour of the Broadway revival of A Chorus Line.

== Career ==
=== Theatre ===
After joining the American national tour of A Chorus Line in the role of Mark, Johnson made his Broadway debut in the 2009 revival of Hair, as a Member of the Tribe and principal understudy for Gavin Creel in the leading role of Claude. Directed by Diane Paulus, the production won the 2009 Tony Award for Best Revival of a Musical. In 2010, he played Jack Kelly in one of the first readings of the musical Newsies.

In 2011, Johnson appeared in the original Broadway cast of the musical Catch Me If You Can as standby for the leading role of Frank Abagnale, played by Aaron Tveit. Johnson returned to Broadway in 2013, playing Greg Wilhote in the original cast of the musical Hands on a Hardbody.

In 2014, Johnson starred in the Lincoln Center and New York Philharmonic production of Stephen Sondheim's musical Sweeney Todd. In a New York Times review of the production, directed by Lonny Price, critic Charles Isherwood praised Johnson's performance.

From 2014 to 2015, Johnson starred as Chip in the Broadway revival of Leonard Bernstein, Betty Comden, and Adolph Green's On the Town, directed by John Rando at the Lyric Theatre. For his performance, Johnson received Astaire Award and Clive Barnes Award nominations.

In 2017, Johnson starred in the New York City Opera production of Leonard Bernstein's Candide, directed by Harold Prince. As the title character, he garnered acclaim for his performance.

In February 2018, Johnson appeared in the world premiere of Fire and Air, the final play by Tony Award-winner Terrence McNally, at Classic Stage Company. Johnson played Léonide Massine. The production was directed by Tony Award-winner John Doyle.

Johnson joined the Broadway company of The Phantom of the Opera on April 30, 2018, in the role of Raoul, Vicomte de Chagny, again directed by Harold Prince. Johnson played the role for over a year, departing September 3, 2019. During his run in Phantom, Johnson appeared in New York City Center's 75th Anniversary gala presentation of A Chorus Line, this time in the role of Bobby. The production, which recreated Michael Bennett's original Broadway production, was directed by Bob Avian and choreographed by Baayork Lee, and ran for seven performances at City Center in November 2018.

After departing Phantom in 2019, Johnson reunited with director Lonny Price in the world premiere of Adam Gwon and Michael Mitnick's musical Scotland, PA (based on the film of the same name) at Roundabout Theatre Company. For his performance as Banko (a version of Macbeth's Banquo), Johnson received nominations for the Drama Desk Award for Outstanding Featured Actor in a Musical and Lucille Lortel Award for Outstanding Featured Actor in a Musical. Johnson received an honor from the Outer Critics Circle Awards for Outstanding Featured Actor in a Musical for his performance.

In early 2020, Johnson returned to Lincoln Center's David Geffen Hall in a 50th anniversary presentation of Andrew Lloyd Webber's Joseph and the Amazing Technicolor Dreamcoat. Johnson played Reuben in the one-night-only event directed by Michael Arden and produced by Manhattan Concert Productions. Johnson appeared again in 2020 with Roundabout Theatre Company in the New York premiere of the musical Darling Grenadine, written by Daniel Zaitchik and directed by Michael Berresse. Laura Collins-Hughes, writing in The New York Times, praised Johnson's "fine acting" in the production.

In 2022, Johnson appeared as Curtis in the world premiere Second Stage Theatre production of To My Girls, a play written by JC Lee and directed by Stephen Brackett.

In the fourth quarter of 2022, Johnson appeared in the New York City Center Gala production of Jason Robert Brown and Alfred Uhry's musical Parade, directed by Michael Arden. Johnson played "sensationalist reporter" Britt Craig in a performance The New York Times called "superb". Johnson was set to reprise his role in the Broadway production, opening at the Bernard B. Jacobs Theatre, on March 16, 2023.

=== Concerts and recordings ===
In 2016, Johnson performed in a series of concerts at New York's 54 Below, featuring over a dozen musicians and guest appearances from other vocalists. Stephen Holden, reviewing the show in The New York Times, praised Johnson's vocal performance, stating, "He has the gift." Later that year, Broadway Records released an album of the concert, recorded live, entitled Jay Armstrong Johnson – Live at Feinstein's / 54 Below.

Johnson appeared on Todrick Hall's visual album Straight Outta Oz, released in 2016. He performed the song "Color", a duet with Hall.

In March 2017, Johnson made his Carnegie Hall debut with Michael Feinstein's Standard Time with Michael Feinstein. Johnson appeared again at Carnegie Hall in April 2017 in a MasterVoices production of Babes in Toyland.

Since 2016, Johnson has produced and starred in an annual Halloween-themed fundraiser, a musical parody of the beloved Disney film Hocus Pocus that has featured appearances by Broadway performers. The 2019 event, entitled I Put a Spell on You: The Return of the Sanderson Sisters, was held at New York's (Le) Poisson Rouge venue.

=== Television ===
In 2016, Johnson was cast in the recurring role of FBI recruit, Dr. Will Olsen, on the ABC thriller television series Quantico. He appeared as Olsen in all three seasons of the series.

== Personal life ==
Johnson is gay.

== Awards and nominations ==
In 2013, Johnson won a Drama Desk Award as part of the ensemble of Prospect Theatre Company's production of Working.

In 2020, Johnson received Lucille Lortel Award and Drama Desk Award nominations for his performance as Banko in Roundabout Theatre Company's production of Scotland, PA, a musical based on the film of the same name.

== Filmography ==
=== Film ===
Year	Title	Role	Notes
2009	Sex and the City 2	Wedding Chorus	

=== Television ===
Year	Title	Role	Notes
2007–2010	Law & Order: Special Victims Unit	Paul	Episode: "Trophy and Outsider"
2013	It Could Be Worse	Jay	Episode: "So, We Meet Again"
2014	Live from Lincoln Center	Anthony Hope	Episode: "Sweeney Todd: The Demon Barber of Fleet Street – In Concert with the New York Philharmonic"
2015	Seeking: the Web Series	Sam	Web series
2016–2018	Quantico	Will Olsen	Recurring role

=== Theatre ===
Year	Play	Role	Theatre	Notes
2007	Hairspray	Link Larkin	Weston Playhouse	Regional
2008	A Chorus Line	Mark	Various	US national tour
2010	Hair	Swing u/s Claude / Woof	Al Hirschfeld Theatre	Broadway
2010	Pool Boy	Nick	Barrington Stage Company	Regional
2010	Newsies	Jack Kelly	Unknown	Workshop
2011	Catch Me If You Can	Frank Abagnale Jr. (standby)	Neil Simon Theatre	Broadway
2011	Wild Animals You Should Know	Matthew	Lucille Lortel Theatre	Off-Broadway
2012	The Pirates of Penzance	Frederic	The Muny	Regional
2012	Working	Anthony Palazzo	59E59 Theaters	Off-Broadway
2013	Hands on a Hardbody	Greg Wilhote	Brooks Atkinson Theatre	Broadway
2013	On the Town	Chip	Barrington Stage Company	Regional
2014	Sweeney Todd: The Demon Barber of Fleet Street	Anthony Hope	Avery Fisher Hall	New York Philharmonic
2014	The Most Happy Fella	Herman	New York City Center	Encores!
2014	Hello, Dolly!	Barnaby Tucker	The Muny	Regional
2014–2015	On the Town	Chip	Lyric Theatre	Broadway
2016	42nd Street	Billy Lawlor	The Muny	Regional
2017	Candide	Candide	New York City Opera	Regional
2017	Newsies	Jack Kelly	The Muny	Regional
2017	The Mad Ones	Adam	59E59 Theaters	Off-Broadway
2018	Fire and Air	Leonide Massine	Classic Stage Company	Off-Broadway
2018–2019	The Phantom of the Opera	Raoul, Vicomte de Chagny	Majestic Theatre	Broadway
2018	A Chorus Line	Bobby	New York City Center	Encores!
2019	Scotland, PA	Banko	Laura Pels Theatre	Off-Broadway
2020	Darling Grenadine	Paul	Roundabout Underground	Off-Broadway
2020	Joseph and the Amazing Technicolor Dreamcoat	Reuben / One More Angel	David Geffen Hall	Off-Broadway
2021	Rent	Roger Davis	Shea's 710 Theatre	
2022	To My Girls	Curtis	Tony Kiser Theatre	Off-Broadway
2022	Parade	Britt Craig	New York City Center	Encores!
2023	Parade	Britt Craig	Bernard B. Jacobs Theatre	Broadway
2024	Anything Goes	Billy Crocker	The Muny	Regional
2025	Moulin Rouge! The Musical	Christian	Various	US national tour
2026	Heated Rivalry Unauthorized Musical Parody	Ilya Rozanov	The Club at the Culture Club	Off-Broadway
