= Jake McLaughlin =

American actor (born 1982)

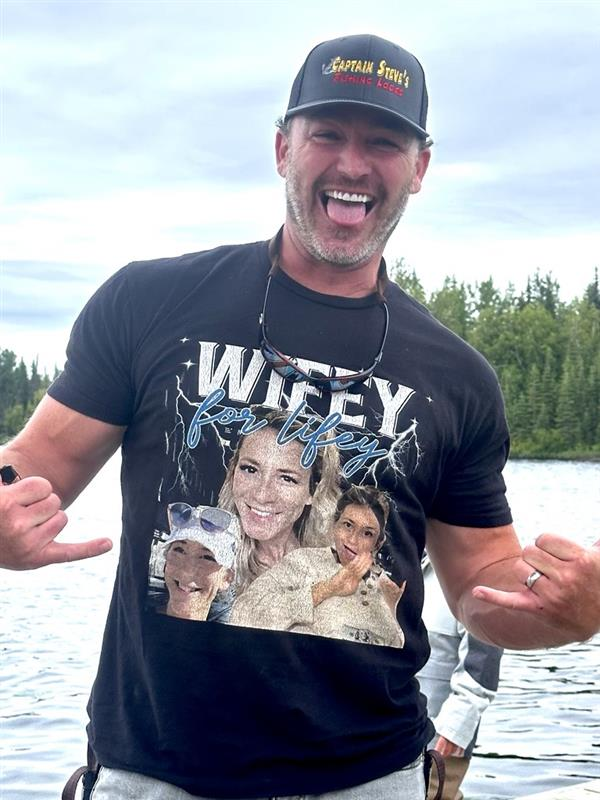
- Jake McLaughlin in 2025
- Born: Jacob Adam McLaughlin; October 7, 1982 (age 44); Paradise, California, U.S.
- Occupations: Actor; soldier
- Years active: 2002–present
- Spouse: Stephanie (m. 2004)
- Children: 5
- Military career
- Allegiance: United States
- Branch: United States Army
- Service years: Iraq War (2002–2006)
- Rank: Unknown
- Unit: 3rd Infantry Division
- Awards: Army Commendation Medal; Combat Infantry Badge; Global War on Terrorism Service Medal; Global War on Terrorism Expeditionary Medal; Army Good Conduct Medal; Army Achievement Medal (4)

Jacob Adam McLaughlin (born October 7, 1982) is an American actor. Following his military service, including action in the Iraq War, he came to attention for his role as Specialist Gordon Bonner in the 2007 film In the Valley of Elah – based on actual events involving American soldiers who served in the Iraq War. He also portrayed Alex Karev’s brother Aaron on Grey's Anatomy.

McLaughlin starred as Tate in the short lived NBC series Believe (2014). He has also been in the main cast for season 2 of Crash (2009), the series Quantico (2015–2018) and the series Will Trent (2023–present).

== Early life ==
McLaughlin is the son of John P. McLaughlin, of Irish descent, and wife Rebecca Kay De Victoria, of Cheyenne and Irish descent.

He attended Paradise Elementary School, Notre Dame Catholic School, and Chico High School in Chico, California. He moved to Southern California and obtained a GED from North Hollywood High School, in Los Angeles, California.

McLaughlin joined the United States Army as a Dismount Infantry Squad Automatic Weapon Gunner in 2002. He was part of the 3rd Infantry Division. During the Iraq War, his unit was one of the first to enter Baghdad.

== Acting career ==
After leaving the military, McLaughlin worked on a crab boat in Oregon and as a security guard at Universal Studios. He was living in Chico, California, doing concrete work and had only $200 in his checking account when he heard about the casting session for Paul Haggis's In the Valley of Elah. Being a former Dismount Infantry S.A.W. Gunner in Iraq in real life, he thought he would read for the role after hearing that Haggis was auditioning actual vets for several parts.

After the success of his first movie, McLaughlin made minor roles in movies such as The Day the Earth Stood Still and Cloverfield. He appeared in episodes of The Unit and CSI: Crime Scene Investigation. He got his first major role on TV in 2009, when he was cast in the television remake of the Oscar-winning film Crash. In the following years he made many appearances on television. In 2011, he was cast in Warrior which was followed by a supporting role in Safe House.

In February 2013, McLaughlin was cast as the male lead in Believe, a television pilot by Alfonso Cuarón which was picked to series in May 2013. The show premiered on NBC in March, 2014.

In March 2015, McLaughlin was cast in the role of Ryan Booth on the television pilot, Quantico, which was picked to series in May. The show premiered on the ABC network in September 2015.

In May 2022, it was announced that McLaughlin would join the main cast of the ABC series, Will Trent, which premiered in January 2023.

== Personal life ==
McLaughlin married Stephanie in 2004. They are parents to three daughters named Rowan, Reagan, and Freya and a son named Logan, and later expected a new son as their fifth child.

== Filmography ==
=== Film ===
Year	Title	Role	Notes
2007	In the Valley of Elah	Specialist Gordon Bonner	
2008	Cloverfield	Helicopter Pilot	
2008	The Day The Earth Stood Still	Soldier	
2011	Super 8	Merrit	
2011	Warrior	Mark Bradford	
2012	Safe House	Miller	
2012	Savages	Doc	
2013	Forever	Tom	
2014	Pain	Inquisitor	
2015	Black Dog, Red Dog	Paul	
2015	Forever	Tom	
2018	Another Time	Adam	
2020	Home	Marvin	
2024	Last Night on Earth	Ryan	
2025	Black Diamond	Jesse	
2025	Site	Neil Bardo	

=== Television ===
Year	Title	Role	Notes
2007	The Unit	Prison Guard	Episode: "Pandemonium: Part 1"
2007	CSI: Crime Scene Investigation	Matt Bartley	Episode: "A La Cart"
2008	CSI: Miami	Sam Laughlin	Episode: "Won't Get Fueled Again"
2008	Leverage	Cpl. Robert Perry	Episode: "The Homecoming Job"
2008	Criminal Minds	Officer Tom Kayser	Episode: "Brothers in Arms"
2008	Heroes	Sligo	Episode: "Into Asylum"
2009	Cold Case	James Addison	2 episodes
2009	Crash	Bo Olinville	Main role (season 2)
2009	Chasing a Dream	John Van Horn	Television film
2009	The Philanthropist	Cpl. Michael Whitmere	Episode: "San Diego"
2010	NCIS: Los Angeles	Keith Rush	Episode: "Full Throttle"
2010	Grey's Anatomy	Aaron Karev	Episode: "Sympathy for the Parents"
2011	The Mentalist	Rowdy Merriman	Episode: "Bloodsport"
2011	In Plain Sight	John Shears/John Stills	Episode: "Provo-Cation"
2012	The Frontier	Cooper Hale	Television pilot
2014	Believe	Tate	Main role
2014	Scorpion	Lt. James Corbett	Episode: "Talismans"
2015–2018	Quantico	Ryan Booth	Main role
2022	Black Bird	Gary Hall	Miniseries; 3 episodes
2023–present	Will Trent	Michael Ormewood	Main role
2024	Yellowstone	Cade McPhereson	2 episodes
