= List of Quantico episodes =

Quantico logo from the opening sequence of the first season.

Quantico is an American drama thriller series that premiered on September 27, 2015, on American Broadcasting Company (ABC). Created by Joshua Safran, who also served as showrunner and an executive producer along with Mark Gordon, Robert Sertner and Nicholas Pepper. In its third season, Safron was replaced by Michael Seitzman, who served as the showrunner as well as an executive producer. The series followed a group of young FBI recruits, or New Agent Trainees (NATs), each with a specific reason for joining the FBI Academy in Quantico, Virginia.

Priyanka Chopra stars as Alex Parrish who, after graduating from the academy, joins the agency. She later becomes a prime suspect for masterminding a bombing at the Grand Central Terminal, the biggest terror attack on New York City since the September 11 attacks. The series (up to the 35th episode) featured two timelines: the present, where Parrish runs from captivity to prove her innocence, and the past, which showed her and her fellow recruits training at the academy while revealing various detail about their previous lives. Halfway through the second season, it switched to one timeline. Every episode's title for the first season is the last word spoken in that episode, while for the second season, the episode's titles are CIA cryptonyms.

Quantico's first-season episodes were primarily shot in Montreal; the second season production was moved to New York. The series' episodes are available for download at the iTunes Store and Amazon Video. The episodes are also available to stream on Netflix. All episodes are approximately 43 minutes excluding commercials and are available in both high-definition and standard.

The first 30 episodes were broadcast on Sunday nights at 10:00 pm Eastern Standard Time (EST), before shifting to Monday nights at 10:00 pm. The series then moved to Thursday nights at 10:00 pm for its third season. On May 11, 2018, after only three of the thirteen episodes in the season had aired, ABC announced the cancellation of the series. However, the network announced that the remaining ten episodes would be burned off on Friday nights at 8:00 pm. The final episode of the series aired on August 3, 2018. During the course of the series, 57 episodes of Quantico aired.

== Series overview ==
| Season | Episodes | Originally released | | Rank | Average viewers (in millions) |
| Season | Episodes | First released | Last released | Rank | Average viewers (in millions) |
|---|---|---|---|---|---|
| 1 | 22 | September 27, 2015 | May 15, 2016 | 55 | 8.05 |
| 2 | 22 | September 25, 2016 | May 15, 2017 | 99 | 4.53 |
| 3 | 13 | April 26, 2018 | August 3, 2018 | —N/a | —N/a |

== Episodes ==
=== Season 1 (2015–16) ===
| No. overall | No. in season | Title | Directed by | Written by | Original release date | US viewers (millions) |
|---|---|---|---|---|---|---|
| 1 | 1 | "Run" | Marc Munden | Joshua Safran | September 27, 2015 | 7.14 |
| 2 | 2 | "America" | Stephen Kay | Joshua Safran | October 4, 2015 | 6.98 |
| 3 | 3 | "Cover" | Jennifer Lynch | Jordon Nardino | October 11, 2015 | 5.75 |
| 4 | 4 | "Kill" | Rachel Morrison | Cherien Dabis | October 18, 2015 | 5.30 |
| 5 | 5 | "Found" | David McWhirter | Jake Coburn & Justin Brenneman | October 25, 2015 | 5.10 |
| 6 | 6 | "God" | Peter Leto | Beth Schacter | November 1, 2015 | 4.05 |
| 7 | 7 | "Go" | Patrick Norris | Logan Slakter | November 8, 2015 | 4.38 |
| 8 | 8 | "Over" | James Whitmore, Jr. | Justin Brennenman & Sharbari Z. Ahmed | November 15, 2015 | 4.20 |
| 9 | 9 | "Guilty" | Stephen Kay | Cameron Litvack | November 29, 2015 | 4.07 |
| 10 | 10 | "Quantico" | Paul Edwards | Jordon Nardino | December 6, 2015 | 4.39 |
| 11 | 11 | "Inside" | Thor Freudenthal | Joshua Safran | December 13, 2015 | 4.56 |
| 12 | 12 | "Alex" | Jamie Payne | Jake Coburn | March 6, 2016 | 3.75 |
| 13 | 13 | "Clear" | Jamie Barber | Sharbari Z. Ahmed | March 13, 2016 | 3.96 |
| 14 | 14 | "Answer" | Jennifer Lynch | Beth Schacter | March 20, 2016 | 3.54 |
| 15 | 15 | "Turn" | David McWhirter | Cameron Litvack & Logan Slakter | March 27, 2016 | 3.39 |
| 16 | 16 | "Clue" | Steve Robin | Justin Brenneman | April 3, 2016 | 3.68 |
| 17 | 17 | "Care" | Felix Enríquez Alcala | Logan Slakter & Braden Marks | April 10, 2016 | 3.57 |
| 18 | 18 | "Soon" | P. J. Pesce | Cherien Dabis | April 17, 2016 | 3.66 |
| 19 | 19 | "Fast" | J. Miller Tobin | Dan Pulick | April 24, 2016 | 3.46 |
| 20 | 20 | "Drive" | Ron Underwood | Jake Coburn | May 1, 2016 | 3.37 |
| 21 | 21 | "Right" | Holly Dale | Cameron Litvack | May 8, 2016 | 3.48 |
| 22 | 22 | "Yes" | Larry Teng | Joshua Safran | May 15, 2016 | 3.78 |

=== Season 2 (2016–17) ===
| No. overall | No. in season | Title | Directed by | Written by | Original release date | US viewers (millions) |
|---|---|---|---|---|---|---|
| 23 | 1 | "Kudove" | Patrick Norris | Joshua Safran & Logan Slakter | September 25, 2016 | 3.64 |
| 24 | 2 | "Lipstick" | Patrick Norris | Cami Delavigne | October 2, 2016 | 3.57 |
| 25 | 3 | "Stescalade" | Jennifer Lynch | Beth Schacter | October 16, 2016 | 3.04 |
| 26 | 4 | "Kubark" | Steve Robin | Jordon Nardino | October 23, 2016 | 2.79 |
| 27 | 5 | "Kmforget" | Jennifer Lynch | Cameron Litvack | October 30, 2016 | 2.43 |
| 28 | 6 | "Aquiline" | Hanelle Culpepper | Jorge Zamacona | November 6, 2016 | 2.20 |
| 29 | 7 | "Lcflutter" | Steve Robin | Gideon Yago | November 13, 2016 | 2.75 |
| 30 | 8 | "Odenvy" | Reza Tabrizi | Justin Brenneman | November 27, 2016 | 2.29 |
| 31 | 9 | "Cleopatra" | Gideon Raff | Marisha Mukerjee | January 23, 2017 | 2.90 |
| 32 | 10 | "Jmpalm" | David McWhirter | Braden Marks | January 30, 2017 | 2.76 |
| 33 | 11 | "Zrtorch" | Kenneth Fink | Logan Slakter | February 6, 2017 | 2.68 |
| 34 | 12 | "Fallenoracle" | Ralph Hemecker | Jordon Nardino & Justin Brenneman | February 13, 2017 | 2.43 |
| 35 | 13 | "Epicshelter" | Constantine Makris | Beth Schacter & Marisha Mukerjee | February 20, 2017 | 2.47 |
| 36 | 14 | "Lnwilt" | Norman Buckley | Joshua Safran & Gideon Yago | March 20, 2017 | 3.31 |
| 37 | 15 | "Mockingbird" | Patrick Norris | Cameron Litvack & Cami Delavigne | March 27, 2017 | 3.15 |
| 38 | 16 | "Mktopaz" | Constantine Makris | Jon Derengowski & Sara Miller | April 3, 2017 | 2.96 |
| 39 | 17 | "Odyoke" | Steve Robin | Jordon Nardino | April 10, 2017 | 2.57 |
| 40 | 18 | "Kumonk" | David McWhirter | Justin Brenneman | April 17, 2017 | 2.76 |
| 41 | 19 | "Mhorder" | Jennifer Lynch | Logan Slakter & Gideon Yago | April 24, 2017 | 2.59 |
| 42 | 20 | "GlobalReach" | Cherien Dabis | Beth Schacter | May 1, 2017 | 2.65 |
| 43 | 21 | "Rainbow" | Patrick Norris | Cameron Litvack | May 8, 2017 | 2.54 |
| 44 | 22 | "Resistance" | Jim McKay | Joshua Safran | May 15, 2017 | 2.72 |

=== Season 3 (2018) ===
| No. overall | No. in season | Title | Directed by | Written by | Original release date | US viewers (millions) |
|---|---|---|---|---|---|---|
| 45 | 1 | "The Conscience Code" | Russell Lee Fine | Michael Seitzman | April 26, 2018 | 2.66 |
| 46 | 2 | "Fear and Flesh" | Alexandra Kalymnios | Dave Kalstein | May 3, 2018 | 2.15 |
| 47 | 3 | "Hell's Gate" | Constantine Makris | Tom Mularz | May 10, 2018 | 1.97 |
| 48 | 4 | "Spy Games" | Kevin Sullivan | Julia Cohen | May 25, 2018 | 2.62 |
| 49 | 5 | "The Blood of Romeo" | David McWhirter | Adam Armus | June 1, 2018 | 2.99 |
| 50 | 6 | "The Heavens Fall" | Russell Lee Fine | Michael Brandon Guercio | June 15, 2018 | 2.56 |
| 51 | 7 | "Bullet Train" | Rob Bowman | Tom Mularz & Gideon Yago | June 22, 2018 | 2.41 |
| 52 | 8 | "Deep Cover" | Jim McKay | Cole Maliska & Joe Webb | June 29, 2018 | 2.71 |
| 53 | 9 | "Fear Feargach" | P. J. Pesce | Dave Kalstein & Matthew Klam | July 6, 2018 | 2.76 |
| 54 | 10 | "No Place Is Home" | Kenneth Fink | Gisselle Legere & Julia Cohen | July 13, 2018 | 2.68 |
| 55 | 11 | "The Art of War" | Jennifer Phang | Adam Armus & Tom Mularz | July 20, 2018 | 2.64 |
| 56 | 12 | "Ghosts" | Russell Lee Fine | Julia Cohen & Matthew Klam | July 27, 2018 | 2.66 |
| 57 | 13 | "Who Are You?" | Russell Lee Fine | Dave Kalstein & Michael Seitzman | August 3, 2018 | 2.66 |

== Ratings ==
Quantico : U.S. viewers per episode (millions)
Audience measurement performed by Nielsen Media Research
