= Quantico season 1 =

Quantico
- Season 1
- Starring: Priyanka Chopra; Josh Hopkins; Jake McLaughlin; Aunjanue Ellis; Yasmine Al Massri; Johanna Braddy; Tate Ellington; Graham Rogers; Anabelle Acosta
- No. of episodes: 22

Release
- Original network: ABC
- Original release: September 27, 2015 – May 15, 2016

Season chronology
- Next → Season 2

The first season of the American drama thriller series Quantico premiered in the United States on the American Broadcasting Company (ABC) on September 27, 2015, and concluded on May 15, 2016. ABC Studios produced the season, with creator Joshua Safran, Mark Gordon, Robert Sertner, Nicholas Pepper and Jake Coburn serving as executive producers.

Consisting of twenty-two episodes, season one follows Alex Parrish, the brightest FBI recruit in her class, who becomes an FBI field agent after graduating from the FBI Academy at Quantico, Virginia, and later becomes a prime suspect after a terrorist attack on Grand Central Terminal. Told using dual timelines, the narrative switches between the present, where Parrish runs from captivity to prove her innocence, and the past, which shows her training at the academy with her fellow recruits as details about their lives and relationships with one another are revealed.

Season one aired on Sundays in the United States at 10:00 p.m. It debuted with strong numbers, averaging 8.05 million viewers and received positive reviews from critics. Priyanka Chopra won the 2016's People's Choice Award for Favorite Actress in a New TV Series for her portrayal of Alex Parrish, making her the first South Asian to win a People's Choice Award. Walt Disney Studios Home Entertainment released season one on DVD on September 13, 2016.

== Overview ==
Season one begins with Alex Parrish, a former FBI recruit, becoming a prime suspect following a terrorist attack on Grand Central Terminal. She is taken into custody and charged with treason. Her first escape is orchestrated by Deputy Director Miranda Shaw, her primary instructor at Quantico, who refuses to believe that she is guilty and feels someone from her class has framed her. Various flashbacks show Parrish and fellow agents, each having their secret reasons for joining the FBI, training at the FBI Academy. The present timeline focuses on the restrained relationship between Parrish and her boyfriend Ryan Booth and fellow trainees and friends, including: Shelby Wyatt, Nimah and Raina Amin, Natalie Vasquez, Simon Asher, Elias Harper and Caleb Haas, who all somehow seem connected to the bombing, while she is on the run to prove her innocence.

As the season progresses, Alex is able to prove her innocence with the help of her friends. She discovers that the suspected bomber is former FBI analyst-trainee Elias Harper, who planted the bomb on the instructions of a terrorist mastermind. Having cleared her name at a congressional hearing, Parrish is reinstated as an FBI agent and assigned to the field office in New York. In the operations section, she works to uncover the mastermind behind the bombings, as the 2016 presidential election nears. The supervising training agent Liam O'Connor is eventually revealed to be the responsible individual and is shot and killed by Parrish and Booth. Parrish is fired from the FBI because of the subsequent publicity of the bombings and Liam's treachery. Two months later, she is approached by Matthew Keyes, who offers her a position at the Central Intelligence Agency (CIA).

== Episodes ==
No. overall	No. in season	Title	Directed by	Written by	Original release date	US viewers (millions)
1	1	"Run"	Marc Munden	Joshua Safran	September 27, 2015	7.14
FBI recruit Alex Parrish is found amidst the ruins of Grand Central Terminal following a terrorist bombing. She is held by the FBI and questioned by Agent Jimenez. Flashbacks from nine months earlier show her training at Quantico with the other FBI recruits. One of them, Ryan Booth, is actually an undercover agent who is instructed by Special Agent O'Connor to surveil Alex. Alex had told O'Connor how she shot her abusive father, Jeff Michaels, while he fought her mother. He turns out to be an FBI agent. Back in the present, the FBI find Ryan unconscious, in Alex' apartment, shot with her gun, and evidence that points to her involvement in the attack. Alex is arrested. Miranda Shaw, her mentor from Quantico, helps her to escape.
2	2	"America"	Stephen Kay	Joshua Safran	October 4, 2015	6.98
Liam has caught Miranda, but Alex has escaped. She visits her apartment to collect evidence and is almost caught by Natalie. Alex calls Ryan at the hospital; he tells her he does not remember who shot him, but he knows it was not her. He offers to help her from the inside, but to do so, he must tell Liam that Alex is guilty. At Quantico nine months earlier, Miranda warns Nimah and Raina not to blow their cover. Elias finds out about Simon's past in Gaza, and Miranda finds out that Ryan is an undercover agent and worries that he is spying on her.
3	3	"Cover"	Jennifer Lynch	Jordon Nardino	October 11, 2015	5.75
Alex's mother, Sita, is brought in for questioning and reveals that Alex vanished for a year when she was in India. Liam convinces her to beg Alex to turn herself in during a television press conference. Meanwhile, Alex seeks help from Simon, who was kicked out of Quantico earlier. They discover that Alex was being set up from the beginning of her training. Simon helps her escape, but he is secretly working for FBI Director Clayton. At Quantico, Alex learns from Liam that her father was a special agent. The NATs (New Agent Trainees) complete psychological profiles of each other, but the exercise is a test set up by Miranda. Raina must step up to the plate when Nimah leaves Quantico. Miranda learns that her son, Charlie, who she had put into prison, may be paroled.
4	4	"Kill"	Rachel Morrison	Cherien Dabis	October 18, 2015	5.30
Simon helps Alex avoid being captured by the FBI. They track the wire in her apartment to one of Shelby's companies and search for evidence at her house. Shelby knows that Simon is officially undercover for Clayton; Ryan also discovers it. In the end, Alex holds Shelby hostage, Ryan and Simon plot together, and Clayton announces Alex' status as an escapee is now shoot-to-kill. At Quantico, Alex still struggles with what she learned about her father, and fails during the training raid part of a hostage situation. Liam wants Ryan to get Alex to quit Quantico. Ryan learns that his undercover assignment was never officially sanctioned. Meanwhile, Miranda asks Nimah to return to Quantico, and tells her how her son was influenced by extremist groups to plan an attack on his high school. Elias becomes more suspicious about Simon.
5	5	"Found"	David McWhirter	Jake Coburn & Justin Brenneman	October 25, 2015	5.10
At Quantico, Miranda sends the NATs on an undercover mission. They are each asked to pose as a person, infiltrate a company, and meet the CEO. Caleb destroys all of Shelby's efforts as a way of taking revenge, as he thinks she has revealed he was in the shooting arena in the beginning. At the end, Alex, Ryan, and Nimah are among the "winners" of the challenge. Nimah and Raina make up, and Nimah encourages Raina to pursue Simon. When Elias finds out that Simon has been lying about everything and wants to report him, Simon tells him he was in the Israeli Defense Force and is now living a lie to cope. In the present timeline, Alex broadcasts a video, with the help of Duncan Howell and Mia, who work for the hacktivist group The Unknown, stating her side of the story. Then she escapes from the venue, leaving Shelby behind. By then Shelby believes that Alex could not have bombed Grand Central and does not give up Simon and Ryan. Simon gets a message with the names of agents near the area at the time of the bombing and Caleb is on the list.
6	6	"God"	Peter Leto	Beth Schacter	November 1, 2015	4.05
Romances heat up between Alex and Ryan, and Caleb and Shelby at Quantico. The recruits learn the art of surveilling suspects. Meanwhile, Miranda Shaw must deal with her recently paroled, terrorist son Charlie, and decides to take advantage of the surveillance assignment to keep an eye on him. While surveying Shaw's home for an assignment, Alex finally learns that Liam has hired Booth to spy on her. Nimah plays matchmaker for Simon and Raina but, in the end, Simon catches the twins together in their room. In the present, Caleb takes over the investigation, prompting Simon to bug his computer, but it turns out that Shelby is the one Caleb is investigating. Simon and Alex find surveillance footage showing one of the twins at Grand Central before the attack.
7	7	"Go"	Patrick Norris	Logan Slakter	November 8, 2015	4.38
One of the twins is seen at Grand Central two days before the bombing. When Simon and Alex find one of them – Raina – she explains they have infiltrated a terrorist group across the street and are trying to find out when its next attack is planned. At Quantico, the trainees face a crucial test. They are locked in a classroom with a bomb left by Brandon Fletcher. The trainees work together to unlock the door, but are unable to defuse the bomb in time. However, they discover the bomb is a fake. Trainees who remained with the team as the bomb was being defused have passed the test, and demonstrated their readiness to sacrifice themselves for the country. Caleb is bumped back to NAT and the twins, Nimah and Raina, are officially introduced to the class by Miranda Shaw. In the present, Natalie suspects Ryan of helping Alex. She tracks him and leads the FBI to Alex. While trying to apprehend her, the FBI raid puts the twins and their operation in danger. It ends with Ryan being shot.
8	8	"Over"	James Whitmore, Jr.	Justin Brennenman & Sharbari Z. Ahmed	November 15, 2015	4.20
Ryan talks Alex through field surgery to save his life. When the FBI's files are hacked, Alex calls her friends from the Unknown to help sort out the data. Meanwhile, Clayton asks Caleb to erase any trace of his affair with Shelby, leading Caleb to stumble upon evidence that might exonerate Alex. At Quantico, the NATs are given personalized assignments that turn out to be part of a larger lesson at FBI headquarters. Ryan helps Alex get information on her father, leading to a confrontation with Liam, who reveals a secret from their fathers' pasts. Caleb accidentally reveals the existence of Shelby's half-sister to the FBI. Miranda tries to engage with her son Charlie, with tragic consequences. Simon and Raina are disappointed to learn that it is Nimah he is more interested in. In the present, Alex realizes that there is another deadlier bomb, and reluctantly turns herself in to inform the FBI of the threat.
9	9	"Guilty"	Stephen Kay	Cameron Litvack	November 29, 2015	4.07
Elias has been called by Alex before she surrenders and returns as her legal counsel. HIG, another government group, has a presidential executive order to interrogate Alex. They press her to confess by torturing Ryan, who was caught when his helicopter was intercepted. When Caleb examines Agent Goodwin's body, he notices that her phone is missing, and that her body was made to look like she was caught in the explosion. Caleb, Elias, Natalie, Liam, and the twins want to help Alex by establishing a timeline. They discover that she was kidnapped and drugged before supposedly being relocated by van to the explosion site. This is enough evidence for Liam to free her from HIG, but Alex agrees to plead guilty so that the real culprits still feel safe. At Quantico, Miranda is at the hospital after being attacked. Ryan is concerned with Alex constantly checking up on Liam, who is getting drunk because he was unable to prevent the terrorist attack when working with her father. Simon decides to report falsified evidence about a serial killer and is criticized by the other NATs.
10	10	"Quantico"	Paul Edwards	Jordon Nardino	December 6, 2015	4.39
The twins, Caleb, Shelby, Natalie, and Simon go to work investigating the rest of their class to find the real traitor. Liam frees Miranda and they convince Alex to put the others under surveillance since she is now the only NAT who cannot be guilty. Nimah discovers what they are up to and tells the others, while reprimanding Raina for her sympathy for the terrorist they were dealing with. Simon meets his Israeli bomb maker friend then reveals to everyone the Grand Central bombing is based on a dark plan he once devised. He denies knowing anything about the bombing itself. At Quantico, the NATs are assigned to help vet the next class. Alex and Ryan investigate Natalie who is called before the NAT review board under suspicion of lying on her application. Nimah learns the truth of Simon's past as an IDF assassin and forces him to reveal horrific details to the rest of the class. Ryan defends him, but accidentally reveals that Simon attacked him weeks earlier; Simon is dismissed from training and the academy. Natalie is allowed to continue. Ryan and Alex discuss their future before he departs.
11	11	"Inside"	Thor Freudenthal	Joshua Safran	December 13, 2015	4.56
At Quantico, the NATs are given a long weekend off for New Year's Eve. Alex, Natalie, Shelby and Nimah, all fleeing from family problems, try to spend the weekend drinking and reviewing cold cases. Nimah tries to have a heart-to-heart with Miranda about her son's potential abduction, with mixed results. When Miranda goes home, she finds Charlie injured on her doorstep. Caleb brings the others to a political soiree where Shelby finally meets his mother Senator Claire Haas, but his resentment toward his parents has disastrous consequences for his relationship with Shelby. Meanwhile, Alex encounters Ryan, undercover with his ex-wife Hannah, still pining for her. In the present, Alex, Nimah, and Natalie learn of Simon's disappearance from a battered Elias and find him with a detonator taped to his hand in the hotel where the Democratic delegates are staying. While Miranda works to defuse the bomb, Liam gets the delegates to the command center, where Senator Haas tells Shelby that she will ruin her for breaking Caleb's heart. Later, the agents are horrified to learn that there is a third bomb that detonates in the command center.
12	12	"Alex"	Jamie Payne	Jake Coburn	March 6, 2016	3.75
The bomb kills 32 FBI agents, including Clayton. His affair with Shelby has gone public, ruining her career. Duncan Howell commits suicide exclaiming that, like Elias, he "didn't have a choice". On trial, despite believing otherwise, Alex reverses her position stating that Elias had no accomplice. Alex receives a phone call from an anonymous individual who claims to be the one she is looking for and requests a meeting with her. At the specified location, the caller sends Alex the suicide video of Duncan and tells her that she will help to "finish what [they] started," right before Natalie shows up and reveals a bomb strapped to her. At Quantico, the NATs are in competition against another team of more experienced trainees including Will Olsen, Iris Chang, and Drew Perales. The trainees from both classes are to train and live together. Meanwhile, Charlie discloses to Raina the names of his kidnappers.
13	13	"Clear"	Jamie Barber	Sharbari Z. Ahmed	March 13, 2016	3.96
Alex and Natalie are contacted by the terrorist to steal information from the FBI's servers, which requires Ryan's keycard and Hannah's fingerprint. Using a fake bomb threat to get everyone out of the building, they get the information, but hide a worm inside it before sending it. Alex and Natalie track the terrorist's computer using the worm, but Natalie is killed by an explosion. At Quantico, the NATs are learning how to get informants to turn. Alex and Iris are the only ones to find a potential informant, but because they must compromise themselves, they fail the exercise. Meanwhile, Nimah is concerned with Raina's constant disappearances and, after finding her talking to someone online, follows her to their house. With help from Clayton, Caleb and Shelby try to find Samar and her kidnappers, only to learn that she has not been kidnapped. Their search for revenge ends up dry in Croatia. Iris gives Shelby a contact that could help. Miranda grants Natalie a leave of absence so she can fight for custody of her daughter.
14	14	"Answer"	Jennifer Lynch	Beth Schacter	March 20, 2016	3.54
Miranda tells Ryan and Nimah that Alex did not show up to work and that the FBI received a request for emergency leave from Natalie. Ryan and Nimah track Alex to Vermont, where she has gone to meet Simon. Alex asks Simon to help her, before Nimah drives her back home. Simon decides to destroy his cabin and comes to Alex's apartment. As the terrorist calls, Simon plugs something into Alex's phone and then tells her to pick up. At Quantico, the class works on suspect interrogation and court trials. Nimah finds that Raina has been meeting with Charlie's kidnappers, at Miranda's request, and Will finds that Caleb has a second persona which he uses to meet with Samar. Shelby reveals the story about Samar to Iris. Alex gets information about the FBI's Chicago case from Liam. This results in Drew confronting him during class, as Liam was responsible for supplying the guns used to shoot Drew's fiancée. Liam kicks Drew out and Miranda, who realizes that Liam slept with Alex during New Years, tells him that she expects his resignation letter first thing in the morning.
15	15	"Turn"	David McWhirter	Cameron Litvack & Logan Slakter	March 27, 2016	3.39
The terrorist gives Alex a pill bottle and tells her to swap it with the one in Senator Claire Haas' purse. Alex attempts to make the switch. Simon, who has recorded the terrorist's call, attempts to find their real voice. Alex's failed attempts cause her to run into Hannah. After Alex tells Hannah about the terrorist and Natalie's death, Hannah kicks her out. However, at Alex's house, the terrorist says that the switch was made. Hannah reveals that she made the switch and believes Alex. At Quantico, as Claire Haas is leading the week's exercise the terrorist cell Raina infiltrated attacks the academy. During the attack, Caleb and Will team up to save Shelby, and Drew kills a terrorist who nearly shot Liam. After the attack, Liam thanks Drew and says that he belongs at Quantico. Shelby learns that Samar was working for her parents, who faked their deaths. At Miranda's house, one of the terrorists holds her, Raina, and Charlie hostage. Charlie shoots the terrorist, but soon starts freaking out, as he will go to prison. Before the FBI agent outside can kill Charlie, Miranda shoots him.
16	16	"Clue"	Steve Robin	Justin Brenneman	April 3, 2016	3.68
When Senator Haas changes her schedule, Hannah and Alex realize that the terrorist (referred to as "the Voice") will move up their timetable. The two prevent Senator Haas' assassination at the cost of Hannah's suspension. Ryan, believing Alex responsible, warns her that he will be watching her. Simon learns that a lab near the auditorium of Claire's campaign office was broken into, suggesting the possibility that the assassination attempt was a cover. At Quantico, the class undergoes counseling after last week's attack. Raina and Miranda each have to speak with a group regarding Raina's infiltration of the cell. After an assignment which is a no-win scenario, Shelby breaks down and is comforted by Alex over her feelings about her parents. Meanwhile, Caleb tells Will that his alternate persona, Mark Raymond, is used for infiltrating a group called Sistemics so that he can rescue his friend. Miranda says in her interrogation that she assigned Raina and, as a result, is removed as teacher; Ryan is assigned to substitute for her.
17	17	"Care"	Felix Enríquez Alcala	Logan Slakter & Braden Marks	April 10, 2016	3.57
In their last mission for "the Voice," Simon and Alex must release an asset the FBI and CIA are trying to hide. Using a tracker on Ryan, they locate the asset: Will, who gained access to US military codes via hacking. Ryan fails to prove to Liam that Alex is to blame for the release of the asset. Will offers to go to the terrorists voluntarily, promising to work from the inside. At the time of the drop, the terrorist asks for Simon. The driver at the exchange is revealed to be Shelby. Meanwhile, at Quantico, the class must sneak back into the US without passports as if they were illegal immigrants. Caleb has already planned to take Shelby to meet her parents, who reveal they are on the run because they are accidental accessories to the 9/11 attacks. After learning that they only wanted more money to stay on the run, Caleb offers them $5 million if they agree not to contact Shelby ever again. Drew and Alex work together, despite being assigned different partners, to complete the mission. Nimah and Raina use the fact that they are twins to their advantage and win the exercise.
18	18	"Soon"	P. J. Pesce	Cherien Dabis	April 17, 2016	3.66
Alex finds out the car in which Shelby took Simon and Will was rented under the name "Mark Raymond". Ryan and Nimah spy on Alex using Ryan's desktop computer. Alex asks Raina, who is no longer working for the Bureau, to distract Ryan by pretending to be Nimah. When this fails, she warns Alex, who is soon picked up by an irritated Claire. The Senator takes Alex to her home and reveals Caleb, who is now a drug addict. Claire guiltily tells Alex that she will check him into rehab in four days when her campaigning is over; Caleb blames himself for his father's death and takes drugs to cope. Caleb sneaks out and tells Alex he will come with her, though his true loyalty remains murky. Back at Quantico, the NATs undergo a comprehensive medical and fitness test and later have their security clearances checked; Iris does not pass. Caleb's and Will's attempts to infiltrate Sistemics go wrong, resulting in Haas being forced to beat up Will with Shelby as a witness.
19	19	"Fast"	J. Miller Tobin	Dan Pulick	April 24, 2016	3.46
Ryan is visited by Natalie's mother, who has not heard from her since she took emergency leave. Ryan and Nimah find that Alex helped Natalie bypass security on the last day before she went missing. While Caleb rests at Alex's apartment, she finds Shelby at the Bureau, installing new software. The two work together to trace the caller to a definite location and find Will, who is sick, and says he created a nuke. At Quantico, the NATs are learning about different fields in which they can work. Liam gives the twins a handler who does not seem interested in them; they do not trust him. Alex sees Drew has tremors in his hands and wants to tell Liam and Ryan, but does not want to ruin his chances. Shelby goes to Sistemics to learn what Caleb is up to.
20	20	"Drive"	Ron Underwood	Jake Coburn	May 1, 2016	3.37
Ryan issues a warrant for Alex's arrest, as she was the last one to see Natalie. Meanwhile, Alex and Shelby find Drew with similar symptoms as Will's. Drew claims that Ryan is "the Voice" and gives Alex a decryption USB to search through Ryan's computer for evidence. Alex learns too late that Drew is "the Voice" and that the USB planted files to frame Ryan. Drew tells Alex to drive Ryan's truck, which has a nuclear bomb in it. In the past, the NATs visited an FBI post in Richmond. Alex and Brandon take down someone involved in child pornography, and Alex learns more of what happened to Ryan in Chicago. Iris learns the truth about Shelby's parents conning her from Caleb. After hearing this from Iris, Shelby confronts Caleb and calls Clayton to take down her parents. Nimah and Raina are assigned to find a specific contact in the Richmond office. While Raina meets the true contact, Nimah mistakes one of the other office members, but is able to persuade him not to tell their handler. They are eventually given their assignment to infiltrate the Islamic Front cell which Hamza Kouri leads.
21	21	"Right"	Holly Dale	Cameron Litvack	May 8, 2016	3.48
While Alex drives Ryan's truck, Shelby and Senator Haas work with the FBI to find Alex and Drew, "the Voice". However, Drew and Simon are tied up and "the Voice" has been using Drew's voice pattern to disguise himself again. Simon is able to escape, but Drew is caught in an explosion. Miranda is shot by Liam. At Quantico, Shelby and Alex switch key-cards, leading to Shelby forging documents to convince her parents to meet her in the US, where she plans on getting them arrested. Caleb intervenes and gets Shelby's mom to leave. Having switched with Shelby, Alex is able to access her dad's journals from Omaha. She learns that her dad and Liam made a critical mistake, and their handler burned a piece of evidence to keep the bureau out of further trouble. When Ryan finds out about Liam's mistake in Omaha, he tells him he will not go with him to D.C. Meanwhile, Nimah is ready to infiltrate Hamza's terrorist cell, but Raina is having second thoughts and considers leaving with Simon. She decides to stay with Nimah.
22	22	"Yes"	Larry Teng	Joshua Safran	May 15, 2016	3.78
The episode begins with a montage showing how Liam orchestrated the entire terrorist plot to frame Alex. In Quantico, the NATs are preparing to graduate. After Alex realizes that Ryan lied about his work assignment, she breaks off their relationship again. Meanwhile, Shelby, still upset at Caleb for ruining her chance at bringing her parents to justice, sabotages him by telling his mother his goings-on. In the present timeline, Ryan discovers that Miranda was being watched, which does not line up with their explanation for everything. After visiting Liam's home, Alex discovers that "the Voice" is Liam, who has kidnapped both Ryan and Miranda. He has taken them back to Quantico, where he plans to detonate the nuclear bomb. When they arrive, Liam explains his motives and Alex and Ryan manage to kill him. After the team discovers that the bomb cannot be stopped, Simon sacrifices himself by letting the bomb detonate in a lake, killing himself but saving countless lives. At Simon's funeral, Alex tells Claire that she knows she helped Liam. Two months later, after she leaves the FBI, Alex is approached by a man named Matthew Keyes who offers her a position in the CIA.

== Cast ==
=== Main ===
- Priyanka Chopra as Alex Parrish
- Josh Hopkins as Liam O'Connor
- Jake McLaughlin as Ryan Booth
- Aunjanue Ellis as Miranda Shaw
- Yasmine Al Massri as Nimah and Raina Amin
- Johanna Braddy as Shelby Wyatt
- Tate Ellington as Simon Asher
- Graham Rogers as Caleb Haas
- Anabelle Acosta as Natalie Vasquez

=== Recurring ===
- Anna Khaja as Sita Parrish
- Eliza Coupe as Hannah Wyland
- Mark Pellegrino as Clayton Haas
- Marcia Cross as Senator Claire Haas
- Lenny Platt as Drew Perales
- Li Jun Li as Iris Chang
- Jay Armstrong Johnson as Will Olsen
- Rick Cosnett as Elias Harper
- J. Mallory McCree as Charlie Price
- Kelly Rutherford as Laura Wyatt
- Kevin Kilner as Glenn Wyatt
- Jacob Artist as Brandon Fletcher

=== Guest ===
- Peter Michael Dillon as Fred Baxter
- Anthony Ruivivar as Agent Jimenez
- Brian J. Smith as Eric Packer
- Johnathon Schaech as Michael Parrish
- Oded Fehr as Griffin Wells
- Ariane Rinehart as Louisa O'Connor
- Anna Diop as Mia
- David Alpay as Duncan Howell
- Anne Heche as Dr. Susan Langdon
- Michael Aronov as Hamza Kouri
- Mandy Gonzalez as Susan Coombs
- Henry Czerny as Matthew Keyes
- Mark Ghanimé as Danny

== Production ==
=== Development ===
Joshua Safran pitched the series to ABC, describing the show as "Grey's Anatomy meets Homeland". On September 17, 2014, ABC announced the network had bought the original concept for the drama series from ABC Studios, and creator Safran and producer Mark Gordon. ABC ordered the pilot on January 23, 2015, for the 2015–16 television season. In May 2015, the show was ordered to series, with an initial order of 13 episodes for the 2015 network-television season. Good ratings led ABC to pick up the show for a full season on October 13, 2015, with an additional six episodes, increasing the episode count to 19, with the possibility of more episodes. The next month, the season was extended to 22 episodes.

The first season was produced by the ABC Studios in association with The Mark Gordon Company and Random Acts Productions. Safran, Gordon, Robert Sertner, Nicholas Pepper and Jake Coburn served as the executive producers. The show was designed to have a flashback narrative, shifting between two timelines. Safran incorporated the flashforward storytelling technique as he thought it allowed them to spread out the plot points.

=== Casting ===
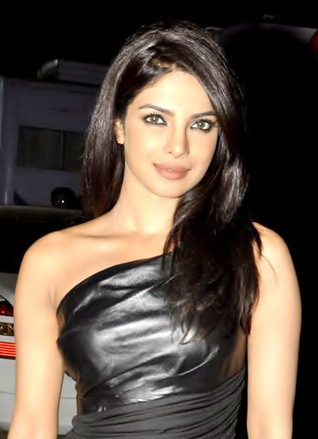
Priyanka Chopra plays the series' protagonist, Alex Parrish.

The casting began in February 2015, with Priyanka Chopra landing the role of protagonist Alex Parrish. Tate Ellington was the first actor to be cast to play one of the FBI trainees – Simon Asher. After his casting, Graham Rogers was cast as FBI trainee Caleb Hass. Aunjanue Ellis was signed to play Miranda Shaw, the assistant director of the Academy, and overseer of the new recruits' training; Dougray Scott was cast as Miranda's former partner and subordinate. In early March, Jake McLaughlin was chosen to play Alex's love interest Ryan Booth, while Johanna Braddy and Yasmine Al Massri rounded out the cast in the final co-starring roles as trainees Shelby Wyatt and the twins Nimah and Raina Amin, respectively. With the series order in May, ABC announced that Dougray Scott, who played Liam O'Connor, would be re-cast in the show. In July 2015, Josh Hopkins joined the cast in the role of Liam O'Connor. The same month, Anabelle Acosta and Rick Cosnett were cast in recurring roles as Natalie Vasquez and Elias Harper. Later, Acosta was promoted to series regular. In September 2015, Jacob Artist was cast in the recurring role of an FBI agent-in-training. In November 2015, Marcia Cross joined the cast as Caleb's mother Claire Haas. Jay Armstrong Johnson, Lenny Platt and Li Jun Li were cast for three recurring characters in November 2015.

Initially conceived as an ensemble drama, Chopra's casting played a key role in the design of the show. Apart from becoming the show's face, and featuring heavily in its publicity campaign, it was specially re-written to center around her as the main character.

=== Filming ===
The pilot episode was filmed extensively in Atlanta in March 2015, with two more days of filming in New York City. The later episodes were filmed in Montreal, Quebec, using settings within downtown Montreal and Sherbrooke, Quebec to stand in for New York City and Quantico. Production began in late July 2015 and ended in mid-April 2016. Scenes of the Quantico Academy were shot at the campus of the Université de Sherbrooke, which stood in for the FBI Academy in Quantico, Virginia, where the show is based. The series was shot both in studio at Mel's Cité du Cinéma and on location. Colleen Sharp, Nicholas Erasmus, Terilyn A. Shropshire and Lori Ball were the editors for multiple episodes. Allyson C Johnson and Vanessa Procopio edited one episode each. The Director of Photography was Anthony Wolberg, who has provided cinematography for the maximum episodes. Other cinematographers include Anastas N. Michos and Todd McMullen. Joel J. Richard provided the music.

== Reception ==
=== Critical response ===
The first season of Quantico received positive reviews, with most praising Priyanka Chopra's performance. The review aggregator website Rotten Tomatoes reported an 82% approval rating with an average rating of 6.9/10 based on 56 reviews. The website's critical consensus reads, "Obvious copycatting aside, Quantico provides ludicrously entertaining thrills from a well-balanced cast." Metacritic, which uses a weighted average, assigned a score of 70 out of 100 based on 25 critics, indicating "generally favorable" reviews.

Newark Star-Ledger's Vicki Hyman declared it to be the best new show of the season, giving it an "A". She felt the show was "taut and terrifically calibrated" noting it has "at least one deadly effective twist you won't see coming". The San Francisco Chronicle praised the series, calling it a winner and wrote: "The plot is intricate and compelling, the characters magnetic and mysterious at the same time." James Poniewozik of The New York Times wrote about Chopra's performance, describing her as the "strongest human asset" of the show, and added that "she is immediately charismatic and commanding". He added that "the narrative gymnastics make the first half-hour of Quantico pass quickly and entertainingly. Too much of this, though, keeps you from investing much in the characters." Robert Bianco from USA Today gave it a three out of four, praising the diversity of the cast and Chopra's and Ellis' performances, writing "There are times when Quantico feels a shade mechanical, in moments when you can practically hear the plot gears moving. But it accomplishes what the opener of a whodunit needs to do: establish a wide range of plausible suspects and spark our interest in the mystery and the hero." In contrast, TheWrap's Tim Grierson, who although felt that the show "provides sexy fun", was less impressed, writing that the show often succumbed to "lame-brained plotting" and an unconvincing portrayal of the setting. He concluded saying that the fluffy material did not fit well with the darker tones "meant to be struck by the introduction of a cataclysmic terrorist attack."

=== Accolades ===
Season one was nominated for two People's Choice Awards at the 2016 ceremony: Favorite New TV Drama and Favorite Actress in a New TV Series which Chopra won making her the first South Asian to win a People's Choice Award. The first season was also nominated for two Teen Choice Awards: Choice Breakout Series and Choice TV: Breakout Star for Chopra. People and Vanity Fair listed the first season among the Best Television Shows of 2015.

=== Ratings ===
The season one premiere on September 27, 2015, attracted 7.14 million viewers with a 1.9 rating among adults 18–49 to rank as the highest-rated scripted telecast on Sunday night opposite Sunday Night Football. It also built by 36% on its lead-in Blood & Oil, which had a 1.4 rating. The pilot episode was also a huge gainer for DVR playback, with over 5 million, a 79% rise for a total 3.4 rating among adults 18–49 and a viewer total of 12.15 million. The show continued to perform well during live viewing while registering strong gains in DVR playback, more than doubling several times in season one. The finale episode garnered 3.78 million viewers with a 1.0 rating among adults in the 18–49 demographic, with a DVR boost of 120% for a total 2.2 rating among adults 18–49 and a total of 6.70 million viewers. Overall, the first season averaged 8.05 million viewers with a 2.6 rating among adults in the 18–49 demographic. It was the third best new series of the season among the adults 18–49 demographic.

Viewership and ratings per episode of Quantico season 1
No.	Title	Air date	Rating/share (18–49)	Viewers (millions)	DVR (18–49)	DVR viewers (millions)	Total (18–49)	Total viewers (millions)
1	"Run"	September 27, 2015	1.9/6	7.14	1.5	5.01	3.4	12.15
2	"America"	October 4, 2015	1.9/6	6.98	1.7	4.93	3.6	11.91
3	"Cover"	October 11, 2015	1.6/5	5.75	1.8	4.90	3.4	10.65
4	"Kill"	October 18, 2015	1.6/5	5.30	1.6	4.59	3.2	9.89
5	"Found"	October 25, 2015	1.5/4	5.10	1.6	4.38	3.1	9.48
6	"God"	November 1, 2015	1.2/3	4.05	1.6	4.65	2.8	8.70
7	"Go"	November 8, 2015	1.3/4	4.38	1.7	4.43	3.0	8.81
8	"Over"	November 15, 2015	1.3/4	4.20	1.8	4.45	3.1	8.65
9	"Guilty"	November 29, 2015	1.2/4	4.07	1.5	4.23	2.7	8.30
10	"Quantico"	December 6, 2015	1.2/4	4.39	1.1	3.12	2.3	7.51
11	"Inside"	December 13, 2015	1.3/4	4.56	1.3	3.68	2.6	8.24
12	"Alex"	March 6, 2016	1.1/4	3.75	1.3	3.87	2.4	7.62
13	"Clear"	March 13, 2016	1.1/4	3.96	1.2	3.38	2.3	7.34
14	"Answer"	March 20, 2016	1.0/3	3.54	1.2	3.44	2.2	6.98
15	"Turn"	March 27, 2016	0.9/3	3.39	1.1	3.13	2.0	6.52
16	"Clue"	April 3, 2016	1.0/3	3.68	1.1	3.06	2.1	6.74
17	"Care"	April 10, 2016	1.1/3	3.57	1.1	3.25	2.2	6.82
18	"Soon"	April 17, 2016	1.0/4	3.66	1.1	2.85	2.1	6.50
19	"Fast"	April 24, 2016	1.0/3	3.46	1.1	3.00	2.1	6.46
20	"Drive"	May 1, 2016	1.0/3	3.37	1.0	2.92	2.0	6.30
21	"Right"	May 8, 2016	0.9/3	3.48	1.1	2.98	2.0	6.46
22	"Yes"	May 15, 2016	1.0/4	3.78	1.2	2.92	2.2	6.70

== Home media release ==
The first season of Quantico was released on DVD and Blu-ray on September 13, 2016, in Region 1.

Quantico: The Complete First Season
Set details	Special features	
22 Episodes; English, French and Spanish subtitles	"Run" Video Commentary; Welcome to Quantico; Who Did It? False Leads, Theories and Red Herrings; Bloopers; Deleted Scenes	
DVD release dates
Region 1	Region 2	Region 4
September 13, 2016	TBA	TBA
