= Quantico (TV series) =

2015 American thriller drama TV series

- Genre: Terrorism thriller; Drama; Conspiracy thriller
- Created by: Joshua Safran
- Showrunners: Joshua Safran; Michael Seitzman
- Starring: Priyanka Chopra; Josh Hopkins; Jake McLaughlin; Aunjanue Ellis; Yasmine Al Massri; Johanna Braddy; Tate Ellington; Graham Rogers; Anabelle Acosta; Russell Tovey; Pearl Thusi; Blair Underwood; Marlee Matlin; Alan Powell
- Composers: Joel J. Richard; Joseph Trapanese; Clinton Shorter
- Country of origin: United States
- No. of seasons: 3
- No. of episodes: 57 (list of episodes)

Production
- Executive producers: Mark Gordon; Robert Sertner; Nicholas Pepper; Joshua Safran; Michael Seitzman
- Producer: Cherien Dabis
- Production locations: Montreal, Quebec; Sherbrooke, Quebec; New York City
- Cinematography: Anthony Wolberg; Anastas N. Michos; Todd McMullen
- Editors: Colleen Sharp; Nicholas Erasmus; Daniel A. Valverde; Terilyn A. Shropshire; Shelby Siegel
- Running time: 43 minutes
- Production companies: ABC Studios; Mark Gordon Company; Random Acts Productions (2015–17); Maniac Productions (2018)

Original release
- Network: ABC
- Release: September 27, 2015 – August 3, 2018

Quantico is an American thriller drama television series which aired on ABC from September 27, 2015, to August 3, 2018, with 57 episodes broadcast over three seasons. Produced by ABC Studios, the series was created by Joshua Safran, who also served as the showrunner. Mark Gordon, Robert Sertner, Nicholas Pepper and Safran are its executive producers. Michael Seitzman replaced Safran as the new showrunner and an executive producer in its third season, with Safran remaining as an executive producer.

Priyanka Chopra stars as Alex Parrish, who joins the FBI after graduating from the FBI Academy and becomes a prime suspect in a terrorist attack on Grand Central Terminal. Quantico initially had two timelines: the present, when Parrish flees from captivity to prove her innocence, and the past, with her and her fellow recruits training at the academy, during which details of their individual lives are learned. The series switched to a single timeline from the middle of the second season onward.

In addition to Chopra, the first South Asian to headline an American network drama series, the original cast—which changed significantly as the series progressed—included Jake McLaughlin, Yasmine Al Massri, Johanna Braddy, Tate Ellington, and Graham Rogers as her fellow recruits, with Josh Hopkins and Aunjanue Ellis as their trainers at the FBI Academy in Quantico, Virginia. The series' first season was produced primarily in Montreal, with downtown Montreal and Sherbrooke, Canada standing in for New York City and Quantico, Virginia in the United States. Production moved to New York during the second season, with a few episodes being shot in Italy and Ireland for its third season.

Quantico received positive reviews from critics, with praise for Chopra's performance and the diversity of the cast. The "confusing dual timelines" were criticized by some. The series was nominated for four People's Choice Awards, including Favorite Network TV Drama, with Chopra winning two: Favorite Actress in a New TV Series in 2016—making her the first South Asian to win a People's Choice Award—and Favorite Dramatic TV Actress in 2017. ABC canceled the series in May 2018, and it ended after three seasons.

== Series overview ==
FBI agent Alex Parrish becomes a prime suspect after a terrorist attack on Grand Central Terminal and is arrested for treason. In flashbacks, she and her fellow recruits (each with their own reason for joining the Bureau) train at the FBI Academy. The present-day timeline focuses on Parrish's strained relationship with her friends while she is on the run and attempting to prove her innocence, even as additional violent attacks take place.

In the second season, Parrish has apparently been fired by the FBI. In flashbacks, she works undercover for the FBI as a CIA recruit at The Farm to uncover the AIC, a rogue faction within the agency. In the present timeline, a hostage crisis at a G-20 summit in New York City is initiated by the Citizens Liberation Front, a terrorist group. Two weeks after the crisis, President Claire Haas and CIA director Matthew Keyes form a covert CIA-FBI task force (led by Clay Haas) to expose eight conspirators who were secretly involved in orchestrating the hostage crisis.

The third season is set three years after the events of the Constitutional Convention. After living anonymously in Italy, Parrish is forced to return to the United States after Ryan Booth shares information to her about Shelby Wyatt's kidnapping by a notorious international arms dealer known as The Widow. In order to save Wyatt, Booth and Parrish recruit Owen Hall and Harry Doyle to help them with their mission. Hall invites Jocelyn Turner to the team as the former FBI agent has intelligence about the arms dealer, due in part to their past history. Owing to the extreme circumstances of the covert operation, the team must retrieve Wyatt at all costs, before time runs out.

Season	Episodes	Originally released		Rank	Average viewers (in millions)
Season	Episodes	First released	Last released	Rank	Average viewers (in millions)
1	22	September 27, 2015	May 15, 2016	55	8.05
2	22	September 25, 2016	May 15, 2017	99	4.53
3	13	April 26, 2018	August 3, 2018	—N/a	—N/a

== Cast and characters ==
- Priyanka Chopra as Alex Parrish, a promising FBI agent who becomes a prime suspect in the Grand Central Terminal bombing case
- Josh Hopkins as Liam O'Connor, a seasoned FBI agent who was demoted to work at the FBI academy as a teacher (season 1)
- Jake McLaughlin as Ryan Booth, an undercover FBI agent tasked with tracking Alex
- Aunjanue Ellis as Miranda Shaw, former assistant director of the FBI Academy at Quantico (seasons 1–2)
- Graham Rogers as Caleb Haas, a former FBI agent (season 1, guest season 2)
- Yasmine Al Massri as Nimah and Raina Amin, twins recruited by Miranda for the FBI (seasons 1–2)
- Johanna Braddy as Shelby Wyatt, Alex's best friend and fellow FBI agent
- Tate Ellington as Simon Asher, Alex's fellow FBI trainee (season 1)
- Anabelle Acosta as Natalie Vasquez, an FBI trainee and Alex's former rival at the academy (season 1)
- Russell Tovey as Harry Doyle, a former MI6 agent and one of the CIA recruits at The Farm (seasons 2–3)
- Pearl Thusi as Dayana Mampasi, an attorney and one of the CIA recruits at The Farm (season 2)
- Blair Underwood as Owen Hall, a former CIA lead instructor at The Farm and current Deputy Director of the FBI (seasons 2–3)
- Marlee Matlin as Jocelyn Turner, an ex-FBI agent and undercover expert whose career was derailed after she was rendered deaf from a bombing (season 3)
- Alan Powell as Mike McQuigg, an overly assertive and adept FBI operative with several years of undercover experience (season 3)

== Production ==
=== Development ===
To me this series is like those high octane summer blockbuster movies we used to have in the '80s and '90s with all of the action and stuff, but there's also like this Trojan horse quality to it as well in that within all the action you get to talk about domestic terrorism, religion, politics, and belief systems. If we go to seasons two and three, that will stay the same, but what the horse is made of will change.

— Safran's plan for Quantico

Series creator Joshua Safran wanted a "straightforward action show" different from his past work, which included the soapy dramas Gossip Girl and Smash. He revealed that he wanted to do something with a law enforcement theme such as a political thriller about the NYPD after the September 11 attacks. He based protagonist Alex Parrish, whose complex family history haunts her throughout the series, on a relative of his; Safran wove his own struggle to understand his family member into Alex's desire to learn the truth about her father.

Safran said,

"I have a family member who either is a pathological liar or has been involved with a government agency my whole life. I've always struggled with knowing that I would never know the truth, because there is no real such thing as the truth with regard to somebody who may or may not be telling the truth. That struggle informed the character of Alex."

He described the series as a sexy romance and a political thriller, adding "It's like, what would Die Hard be if Die Hard was weekly and was also a soap."

Safran offered the series to ABC. On September 17, 2014, the network announced that it had bought the concept for a drama series from ABC Studios and Safran and produced by Mark Gordon, describing it as "Grey's Anatomy meets Homeland." ABC ordered a pilot on January 23, 2015, for the 2015–16 television season. The series was picked up from the pilot, with an initial order of 13 episodes for the 2015 network television season. Good ratings led ABC to pick up Quantico for a full season in October with an additional six episodes (increasing the episode count to 19), with an option for more. In November, the season was extended to 22 episodes. In March 2016, ABC announced that it had renewed Quantico for a second season, also consisting of 22 episodes.

The series was produced by ABC Studios in association with The Mark Gordon Company and Random Acts Productions. Safran, Gordon, Robert Sertner and Nicholas Pepper were the executive producers, with Cherien Dabis as one of the producers. Safran served as the head writer of the series. The writing staff of Quantico consisted of Justin Brenneman, Cami Delavigne, Cameron Litvack, Logan Slakter, Gideon Yago, Beth Schacter, Jordon Nardino, and Cherien Dabis, all of whom wrote multiple episodes for the series. Various directors had worked on several episodes, notably Patrick Morris, Jennifer Lynch, David McWhirter, Stephen Kay and Steve Robin. Colleen Sharp, Nicholas Erasmus, Daniel A. Valverde, Terilyn A. Shropshire and Shelby Siegel edited multiple episodes. The Director of Photography was Anthony Wolberg, who provided cinematography for most episodes. Other cinematographers include Anastas N. Michos and Todd McMullen. Joel J. Richard and Joseph Trapanese wrote the music.

In May 2017, ABC renewed the series for a third season of 13 episodes. The renewal was based on the international popularity of star Priyanka Chopra, who made the series a strong international seller for ABC Studios. As part of the renewal process, Safran stepped down as showrunner but remained as a consultant. The following month, it was announced that Michael Seitzman would be showrunner and that Safran would be credited as an executive producer. ABC canceled the series in May 2018. Seitzman had plans in the works for a fourth season when the series was cancelled.

=== Casting ===
Quantico had a racially diverse cast as FBI recruits who deal with their individual problems. Safran had wanted the series to be diverse from the beginning, saying,

"You're not just watching people who have struggled to achieve places of power and they're there. This show is about the struggle to achieve that. Their politics and their racial makeup and their religious backgrounds are very important to their characterizations and who they are. I really am interested in looking at how every culture handles stress — and in particular, how people from all these different backgrounds find their place in the FBI, an agency that has historically-fraught relationships with gay people and people of color."

The first actor cast in the series was Tate Ellington as FBI trainee Simon Asher. Graham Rogers was then cast as another FBI trainee, Caleb Haas. It was announced that Aunjanue Ellis had signed to play Miranda Shaw, assistant director and training supervisor of the academy. Dougray Scott was cast as Liam O'Connor, Miranda's former partner and current subordinate.

Indian actor Priyanka Chopra was cast as series protagonist Alex Parrish, the result of a talent holding deal with ABC Studios which required the company to develop a starring project for her or cast her in an existing project for the 2015 television season. ABC casting executive Keli Lee had long tried to persuade Chopra to perform on television in the United States. When the actress began considering U.S. TV, Lee learned that Chopra had been approached by another studio: "I said [to Chopra], 'No, you can't make this deal elsewhere. You're coming here. And I'm flying to India.'" Lee went to India and convinced Chopra to accept ABC's offer. The actress said about Lee: "I told her, the only way I would do it is if you find me a show and a path which first will put me in the same position that I am in India."

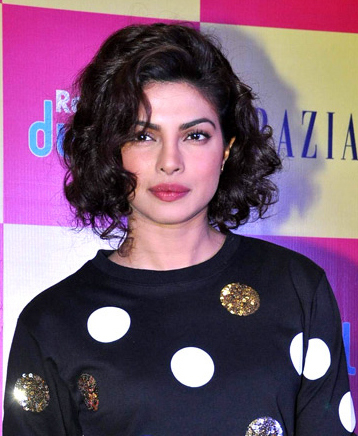
Priyanka Chopra plays series protagonist Alex Parrish.

Chopra saw the deal as an opportunity to represent South Asia and challenge Indian stereotypes in Hollywood and the United States, saying,

"When I was in school [in the U.S.], you never saw anyone who looked like us that was on TV. And that was really weird for me because there's so many people of South Asian descent in America – in the world. I didn't want to be this stereotype of what Indian people are usually seen as in global pop culture. We don't just have to be Apu from The Simpsons."

After being given all 26 pilot scripts which ABC was filming for the 2015–2016 television season, she chose Quantico. Despite having appeared in more than 50 films, she was required to audition for the first time, which she found nerve-wracking.

Safran was impressed by Chopra's audition, which helped him re-envision the character, adding,

"She walked into the room, and it was like the molecules shifted in that way that superstars have. I was very confused because I didn't know who she was, but we all sat up straighter. We're like, this is clearly a movie star; it's like every hair on the back of your neck stands up watching her act. When I went back home I couldn't think about anyone else."

Chopra became the first South Asian to headline an American network drama series.

Jake McLaughlin was chosen to play Ryan Booth, Alex's love interest, and Johanna Braddy and Yasmine Al Massri were cast in the final co-starring roles of trainees Shelby Wyatt and Nimah and Raina Amin. ABC announced after it picked up the pilot that the Liam O'Connor character would be re-cast with Josh Hopkins replacing Dougray Scott in July 2015. That month, it was announced that Anabelle Acosta was cast in a recurring role for a multi-episode story arc as Quantico recruit and former police officer Natalie Vasquez. Rick Cosnett was also signed for a recurring role as Elias Harper, a former defense attorney-analyst recruit. Prior to the premiere, Acosta was promoted to a series regular. In September 2015, Jacob Artist was cast in a recurring role as Brandon Fletcher, an FBI agent-in-training. Marcia Cross was cast as Senator Claire Haas, vice presidential candidate, Caleb's mother, and the wife of FBI Deputy Director Clayton Haas. In November, Jay Armstrong Johnson, Lenny Platt and Li Jun Li were cast as recurring characters who would be added after the mid-season break.

Following the season one finale, Safran confirmed that all series regulars would return for the second season, except for Acosta, Ellington and Hopkins, whose characters were killed off. Safran also expressed interest in bringing back Cross' Claire Haas after it was revealed that she was involved in the bombing plot. Safran discussed the return of Henry Czerny, who played CIA director Matthew Keyes in the season one finale, since the character was important to the storyline. In July 2016, Czerny joined the cast in the recurring role. The series added three regulars to the cast: Russell Tovey as Harry Doyle, Blair Underwood as CIA officer Owen Hall and Pearl Thusi as type-A attorney Dayana Mampasi. In July 2016, Aarón Díaz joined the series in a recurring role as photojournalist León Velez, and it was reported that Tracy Ifeachor and David Lim were cast in recurring roles as Lydia Hall and Sebastian Chen. In early 2017, Hunter Parrish and Krysta Rodriguez were cast in the recurring roles of Clay Haas and Maxine Griffin.

After the third season renewal announcement, it was reported that Al Massri and Thusi would leave the series, and in June 2017, it was reported that Ellis and Tovey would not return as part of a creative overhaul. However, in August 2017, it was confirmed that Tovey would in fact be returning as a series regular. In late July 2017, Marlee Matlin joined the show as a series regular in the role of ex-FBI agent Jocelyn Turner in the third season. Alan Powell joined the cast in November 2017 as series regular Mike McQuigg, an undercover agent. The next month, Amber Skye Noyes joined the third season in the recurring role of Celine Fox. In January 2018, Vandit Bhatt joined in the recurring role of Jagdeep Patel. On February 16, 2018, it was confirmed that Aunjanue Ellis had exited the series.

=== Writing ===
Although Safran initially intended the series to be an ensemble, with Alex the lead protagonist, this changed after Chopra was cast. As the series's "face" and featured in its publicity campaign, Alex dominated the storyline and became the main character. Although she was initially written as Caucasian, Safran completely rewrote her character with Chopra in mind, tweaking her background as she became half-Indian and spent 10 years in Mumbai. Her casting also helped change Alex's personality; in one change, the "jaded and brooding" Alex became "fun and warm". Safran initially focused on the character's dark side, saying that he had never imagined a positive side: "Priyanka came in and played all of that but as a character who was always in control. And still warm and vibrant because she knew no one was going to get through her walls. From that point on, Alex was the kind of character who can have humor, who can have heart."

Quantico was designed with over a half-dozen core characters, in addition to Alex Parrish, for pacing reasons. It was intended to have a flashback narrative, shifting between "the present day with Parrish navigating her way through a class of FBI New Agent Trainees to the near future as the truth and repercussions of the attack emerge." Safran also used flashforwards to spread out the series' plot points. He said in a 2015 interview that although the series is "intricately plotted", it does not intend to overwhelm the viewer: "It is tightly structured and moves quickly between two, sometimes three, time periods, but we made sure that it's not so complicated that it just feels like too much. I like to say that we have a lot of tributaries, but they all lead to one ocean."

The series' diverse cast helped its writers create a variety of storylines and plot points. According to a Variety article on Safran and Quantico, "The show delves below the surface into those disparate backgrounds to explore how each character's personal stories influence their motivations for joining the FBI and in their perspective on the search for truth in the terrorism investigation. That offers a wealth of engaging material for writers to mine." Safran modeled Quantico on Buffy the Vampire Slayer in structure, with self-contained story arcs from season to season. Its producers said that each season would have a specific storyline, with Alex the series' focal point surrounded by a new cast.

Safran called the second season more cohesive, mirroring the first season and "... keep[ing] the two-storyline structure." In an interview, he confirmed that the structure would be "a little bit of flash-forward, but the majority will be what I like to call the present." According to Safran, the producers aimed at a more mature, darker second season which would be "less confusing" to viewers. Safran had plotted an upcoming plot point as the first season ended, which saw Alex clearing her name, getting fired by the FBI and receiving a job offer by the CIA director. He revealed that the season two storyline would focus on the contrasting work ethics of the FBI and the CIA. Safran elaborated about the differences between the FBI and CIA, saying, "We're very interested in the fact that the FBI's so much about being honest, truthful and living up to your badge. And the CIA is the opposite. You succeed if you can deceive. So it's going to be interesting to see. It's like a funhouse mirror of what we've seen." He announced that the series would switch to a single timeline after the fourteenth episode. Safran said that the second season was always designed to adopt a single timeline after the resolved storyline and the aftermath of the hostage crisis, adding, "When we broke Season 2, we knew we were going to go to one timeline, because it's about the [terrorist] event, and then it's about what happens after the event. And you can't flashback to the Farm after the crisis is over." He said that the change was also due to viewer complaints that the first season's dual timeline was confusing.

=== Filming ===
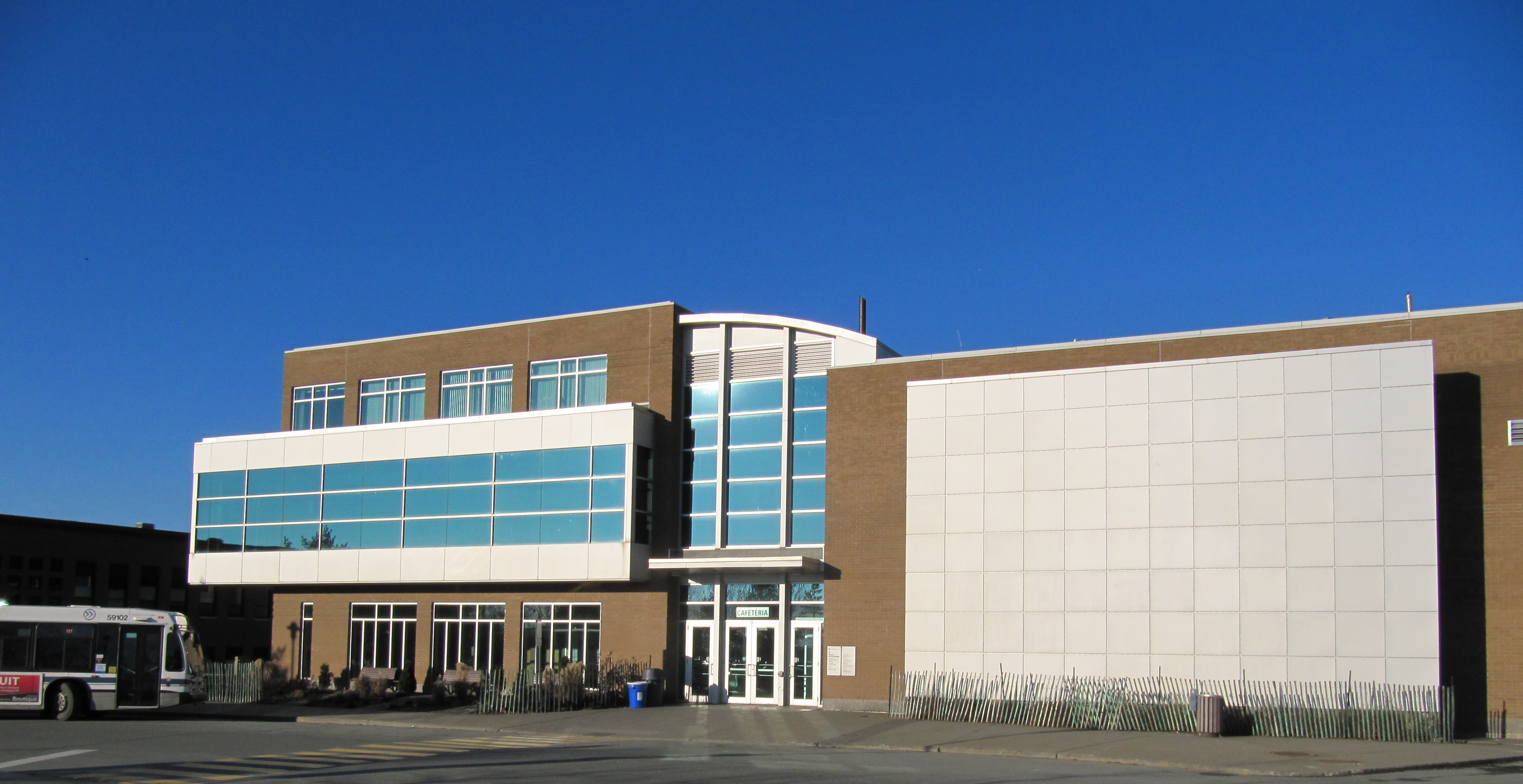
Exterior scenes of the FBI Academy were shot at the Université de Sherbrooke.

Quantico's pilot episode was filmed in Atlanta from March 11 to 26, 2015, with two days of filming in New York. It was announced that the series would be filmed in downtown Montreal and Sherbrooke, which stood in for New York and Quantico, respectively. The first schedule began in late July and ended in late December 2015. Quantico Academy exteriors were filmed on the Université de Sherbrooke campus. The series was shot in Mel's Cité du Cinéma studio and on location. Its second shooting schedule began in January 2016 and continued in Montreal until mid-April.

In April 2016, it was reported that production would move to New York City for its second season; according to Safran, "Season 2 is going to be very much more a New York story." Second season filming, which began in New York on July 13, 2016, was shot at Silvercup Studios and on location. Filming ended in mid-March 2017. Filming for the third season started on October 10, 2017. Certain scenes of the third-season premiere featuring Chopra were shot on location in Italy. The last few episodes of the third season were shot on location in Ireland. Filming for the third season ended in April 2018.

== Release ==
=== Broadcast and distribution ===
Quantico, initially scheduled to air Tuesdays at 10:00 pm, was moved to Sundays at 10:00 pm due to a retooling of Of Kings and Prophets. The series premiered on ABC on Sunday, September 27, 2015. The series debuted in Canada on CTV on the same day as its American premiere. The episodes, about 43 minutes in length, were broadcast in standard and high definition. In Australia, it premiered on the Seven Network on October 11, 2015. The series was acquired by Alibi in the United Kingdom. Season two premiered on September 25, 2016. After the mid-season finale, it moved to Mondays at 10:00 p.m. on January 23, 2017. The third season premiered on April 26, 2018. After the cancellation, it was announced that the network would air the remaining episodes of the third season as previously scheduled.

Standard- and high-definition episodes are available for download at the iTunes Store and Amazon Video. The episodes were available via video on demand on Xfinity. ABC video-on-demand released recent episodes temporarily after their premiere. Season one episodes were on Hulu. The first season became available for streaming on Netflix in a number of countries on August 23, 2016, the second season became available in the U.S. on June 15, 2017 and the third season became available in the U.S. on September 2, 2018. All three seasons were scheduled to leave Netflix in September 2022.

=== Home media ===
The first season of Quantico was released on DVD and Blu-Ray on September 13, 2016, in Region 1 by Walt Disney Studios Home Entertainment.

== Reception ==
=== Critical response ===
The first season of Quantico received positive reviews with most critics praising Chopra's performance. The review aggregator website Rotten Tomatoes reported an 82% approval with an average rating of 6.9/10 (based on 56 reviews). According to the website consensus, "Obvious copycatting aside, Quantico provides ludicrously entertaining thrills from a well-balanced cast." The series has a score of 70/100 (based on 25 reviews) on Metacritic, indicating "generally favorable reviews". The Newark Star-Ledger's Vicki Hyman called Quantico the best new show of the season and graded it an "A". Hyman wrote that the show was "taut and terrifically calibrated ... with at least one deadly effective twist you won't see coming." David Wiegand from San Francisco Chronicle also praised the series: "The plot is intricate and compelling, the characters magnetic and mysterious at the same time." Robert Bianco of USA Today rated Quantico three out of four, calling its cast "an appropriately diverse group, brought to life by generally fine performances, led by Chopra's and Ellis. [. ... ] There are times when Quantico feels a shade mechanical, in moments when you can practically hear the plot gears moving. But it accomplishes what the opener of a whodunit needs to do: establish a wide range of plausible suspects and spark our interest in the mystery and the hero."

James Poniewozik of The New York Times called Chopra the series' "strongest human asset", calling her "immediately charismatic and commanding." Melissa Maerz of Entertainment Weekly called Quantico the best Shonda Rhimes drama that Rhimes never touched and wrote that "Chopra's bound to be a breakout star." Rob Lowman of the Los Angeles Daily News enjoyed the show and Chopra's performance, saying, "Although a bit over-frenetic at times, the series seems to take inspiration from a man-on-the-run Hitchcock thriller. Only in Quantico's case, it's a woman, and they have a charismatic star in Chopra. I was immediately struck by her dynamic screen presence. So far it's one of the most promising new shows, and Chopra is someone worth keeping an eye on." Tim Goodman of The Hollywood Reporter, in a lukewarm review, found its pilot "just good enough to make you watch another." Although TheWrap's Tim Grierson wrote that the show "provides sexy fun", he went on to write: "For a show about highly trained, incredibly intelligent agents, Quantico often succumbs to lame-brained plotting and a less-than-convincing portrayal of its specialized milieu. This new show's fluffy, which doesn't fit so well with the darker, somber tones meant to be struck by the introduction of a cataclysmic terrorist attack."

The second season also received positive reviews. Jasef Wisener of TVOvermind gave the premiere episode a rating of three and a half stars, writing that it set up its sophomore season "effectively". However, Allison Nichols of TV Fanatic was critical of the opening episode owing to the "confusing time jumps" and the "head-spinning plotlines". The episodes following the winter finale when the show's narrative switched to a single timeline garnered further praise by such critics as Madison Vain of Entertainment Weekly, especially for its focus on character development. Kelsey McKinney of New York magazine noted that the show had finally found its groove, writing, "For the first time since its first season, Quantico actually seems to know where it is headed. It's quite a welcome development, and the newfound confidence ... makes Quantico a much more enjoyable show to watch." In a five-star review of the sixteenth episode, Kelsey McKinney of New York wrote that "the show is grappling more and more with the emotions that make us all human, not just the ones that drive the story forward." The series' plot lines, involving current political situations, were also praised.

==== Critics' Top Ten lists – 2015 ====
- No. 8 – People Magazine
- Vanity Fair

=== Ratings ===
==== United States ====
Quantico's season one premiere garnered 7.14 million viewers and a 1.9 rating among adults 18–49, the highest-rated scripted telecast on Sunday night opposite Sunday Night Football. It improved 36 percent on its lead-in, Blood & Oil, which had a 1.4 rating. The pilot episode was also popular for DVR playback with over five million viewers, a 79 percent increase, for a total 3.4 rating among adults 18–49 and total viewership of 12.15 million. The series, which continued to do well in live viewing, more than doubled its viewership several times in DVR playback during the season. The finale had 3.78 million viewers with a 1.0 rating among adults 18–49 and a 120 percent DVR increase for a 2.2 adult 18–49 rating and a total of 6.7 million viewers. The first season averaged 8.05 million viewers with a 2.6 rating among adults 18–49.

The second-season premiere had 3.64 million viewers and a 1.0 rating among adults 18–49. The finale attracted 2.72 million viewers with a 0.6 rating among adults 18–49. The season averaged 4.53 million viewers with a 1.3 rating among adults 18–49. The third-season premiere and series finale both attracted 2.66 million viewers, with a 0.5 and 0.4 rating among adults 18–49 demographic, respectively.

Viewership and ratings per season of Quantico
Season	Timeslot (ET)	Episodes	First aired		Last aired		TV season	Viewership rank	Avg. viewers (millions)	18–49 rank	Avg. 18–49 rating
Season	Timeslot (ET)	Episodes	Date	Viewers (millions)	Date	Viewers (millions)	TV season	Viewership rank	Avg. viewers (millions)	18–49 rank	Avg. 18–49 rating
1	Sunday 10:00 p.m.	22	September 27, 2015	7.14	May 15, 2016	3.78	2015–16	55	8.05	23	2.6
2	Sunday 10:00 p.m. (1–8); Monday 10:00 p.m. (9–22)	22	September 25, 2016	3.64	May 15, 2017	2.72	2016–17	99	4.53	89	1.3
3	Thursday 10:00 p.m. (1–3); Friday 8:00 p.m. (4–13)	13	April 26, 2018	2.66	August 3, 2018	2.66	2017–18	N/A	N/A	N/A	N/A

==== International ====
Quantico continues to be popular in Australia, Canada, France and India. The premiere episode had 2.6 million viewers in Canada, the largest audience for a new television series that year. It was the most-watched episode behind The Big Bang Theory (which had 2.8 million). Averaging 2.17 million viewers, Quantico was Canada's most-watched drama series, most-watched new series and second most-watched series (after The Big Bang Theory) in 2015. It was the most-watched drama series of 2015 in Australia and the second most-watched series overall (after The Big Bang Theory). In France, the series premiered to 4.9 million viewers (a 21 percent audience share) and averaged 3.1 million viewers during its first season. According to a Business Insider report, Quantico was the 12th-most popular TV show of 2016 based on ratings, peer-to-peer sharing, social-media chatter and viewer demand.

=== Accolades ===
By winning the People's Choice Award for Favorite Actress in a New TV Series at the 42nd People's Choice Awards, Chopra became the first South Asian to win a People's Choice Award.

Year	Award	Category	Nominee(s)	Result
2016	People's Choice Awards	Favorite Actress in a New TV Series	Priyanka Chopra	Won
2016	People's Choice Awards	Favorite New TV Drama	Quantico	Nominated
2016	Teen Choice Awards	Choice TV : Breakout Star	Priyanka Chopra	Nominated
2016	Teen Choice Awards	Choice Breakout Series	Quantico	Nominated
2017	People's Choice Awards	Favorite Dramatic TV Actress	Priyanka Chopra	Won
2017	People's Choice Awards	Favorite Network TV Drama	Quantico	Nominated
