= Evan Mock =

American model, actor, and skateboarder

- Born: April 8, 1997 (age 29); Waimea Bay, Hawaii, U.S.
- Occupations: Model; actor; skateboarder
- Years active: 2019–present

Evan Mock is an American model, actor, and skateboarder. He is known for starring in the HBO Max series Gossip Girl.

== Life and career ==
Evan Mock was born in Waimea Bay on Oahu in Hawaii. His mother is Filipino, while his father is American and a surfboard fin maker. Mock was homeschooled. Growing up, he aspired to be a professional surfer or skater. Mock relocated to California at age 18 to professionally skateboard. He rose to prominence after singer Frank Ocean posted a video of him skating.

Mock modeled in fashion shows for the brands Louis Vuitton and 1017 Alyx 9SM and launched a clothing line called Sorry in Advance in 2019. He then appeared in advertisements for fragrances by the retailer the Aldo Group and fashion designer Paco Rabanne. Mock starred in a modeling campaign for a clothing collection by fashion designer Giuseppe Zanotti the following year. In June 2021, he launched a collection with the clothing company RVCA. Mock starred as private school student Akeno "Aki" Menzies in the teen drama television series Gossip Girl, which premiered on HBO Max in July 2021 and ran for two seasons. The series marked his first acting role. Its creator Joshua Safran created the part for Mock to portray.

== Personal life ==
Mock splits his time between Oahu and New York City. Despite playing a character who explores his sexuality on Gossip Girl, Mock is heterosexual. His pink hair has been regarded as his signature look.

== Filmography ==
Year	Title	Role	Notes	Ref.
2021–2023	Gossip Girl	Akeno "Aki" Menzies	Main role	
2024	Fantasmas	Z	1 episode	
2025	Marked Men: Rule + Shaw	Jet Teller	Supporting role	

=== Music videos ===
List of music video credits
Year	Title	Artist	Director	Ref.
2024	"Toxic Till the End"	Rosé	Ramez Silyan	
