= Resident Advisors =

Resident Advisors may refer to:

- Resident assistant, a supervisor in a group housing facility
- Resident Advisor, an online music magazine
- Resident Advisors (TV series), an American comedy series
