= Gossip Girl (2021 TV series) =

American teen drama television series (2021–2023)

- Genre: Teen drama
- Based on: Gossip Girl by Cecily von Ziegesar
- Developed by: Joshua Safran
- Starring: Jordan Alexander; Whitney Peak; Tavi Gevinson; Eli Brown; Thomas Doherty; Emily Alyn Lind; Evan Mock; Johnathan Fernandez; Adam Chanler-Berat; Zión Moreno; Savannah Lee Smith; Jason Gotay; Todd Almond; Laura Benanti; Grace Duah; Megan Ferguson
- Narrated by: Kristen Bell
- Music by: Ariel Rechtshaid
- Country of origin: United States
- Original language: English
- No. of seasons: 2
- No. of episodes: 22

Production
- Executive producers: Joshua Safran; Stephanie Savage; Josh Schwartz; Leslie Morgenstein; Gina Girolamo; Karena Evans; April Blair
- Producers: Ashley Wigfeld; Billy Redner; Kelli Breslin
- Production locations: United States; Italy
- Cinematography: Jeffrey Waldron; Jamie Cairney; Crille Forsberg; Tom Clancey; JP Wakayama; Trevor Forrest
- Editors: Alec Smight; Vanessa Procopio; Allyson C. Johnson; Jacqueline J. Basse; Lori Ball; Karen K.H. Sim
- Running time: 52–61 minutes
- Production companies: Random Acts Productions; Fake Empire; Alloy Entertainment; CBS Studios; Warner Bros. Television

Original release
- Network: HBO Max
- Release: July 8, 2021 – January 26, 2023

Related
- Gossip Girl (2007–2012)

Gossip Girl is an American teen drama television series developed by Joshua Safran for HBO Max. Based on the original CW television series of the same name, itself based on the novel written by Cecily von Ziegesar, it serves as a standalone series in a shared universe. The series is executive produced by original series co-creators Josh Schwartz and Stephanie Savage, along with Safran, who was an executive producer on the first series and who also serves as showrunner. The series is narrated by Kristen Bell, who reprised her role as the voice of Gossip Girl, an anonymous and omniscient blogger. It features an ensemble cast led by Jordan Alexander, Whitney Peak, Tavi Gevinson, Eli Brown, Thomas Doherty, Emily Alyn Lind, Evan Mock, Zión Moreno, Savannah Lee Smith, and Grace Duah.

It was given a straight-to-series order in July 2019 by HBO Max. Filming took place in New York City and was originally scheduled to begin in March 2020 before being delayed until November 2020 due to the COVID-19 pandemic.

Gossip Girl premiered on HBO Max on July 8, 2021, to mixed reviews but broke the record for the most-watched HBO Max original series over its launch weekend. The first season consisted of 12 episodes, split into two six-episode parts, with the second half debuting on November 25, 2021. In September 2021, the series was renewed for a second season, which premiered on December 1, 2022. In January 2023, the series was canceled after two seasons.

== Premise ==
Nearly a decade after the conclusion of the original series, a new cast of Manhattan private schoolers takes the lead under the watchful eye of Gossip Girl, while demonstrating how social media – and New York City itself – has changed in the intervening years. Gossip Girl features more adult content than the original series on The CW, owing to the standards of the HBO Max streaming service.

In regard to continuity, executive producer and showrunner Joshua Safran stated that it is officially in the same continuity of the original Gossip Girl run. However, rather than a direct continuation of the story, it is instead set in the same world where previous characters existed and can be freely referenced and potentially reappear, but stars a different set of characters from a different point of view.

== Cast and characters ==
=== Main ===
- Jordan Alexander as Julien Calloway, an influencer and it girl who goes to Constance Billard as the queen bee. At the beginning of the series, she's dating Obie and is recently united with her half-sister, Zoya.
- Whitney Peak as Zoya Lott, a morally upstanding scholarship freshman at Constance Billard who moved to Manhattan on her half-sister's request. She later forms a relationship with Obie.
- Tavi Gevinson as Kate Keller, an English teacher at Constance Billard who, tired of being bullied by her students, leads a ring of teachers as "Gossip Girl"
- Eli Brown as Otto "Obie" Bergmann IV, an extremely wealthy do-gooder who is considered a guilty rich. He forms a relationship with Zoya after his break up with Julien.
- Thomas Doherty as Max Wolfe, a pansexual and headstrong flirt who has feelings for both Aki and Audrey
- Emily Alyn Lind as Audrey Hope, a dismissive teenager and avid literature reader who is Julien's best friend and Aki's girlfriend with an interest in Max
- Evan Mock as Akeno "Aki" Menzies, a bisexual skateboarder and movie enthusiast who is Obie's best friend and Audrey's boyfriend with an interest in Max
- Johnathan Fernandez as Nick Lott, Zoya's caring father who is a lawyer
- Adam Chanler-Berat as Jordan Glassberg, a Computer Science teacher at Constance Billard who helps run the Gossip Girl account. He is interested in Kate.
- Zión Moreno (Note: Moreno does not appear in 1x07 and 1x11 and is not credited.) as Luna La, a transgender trendsetter from Mexico City who serves as Julien's stylist and friend
- Savannah Lee Smith (Note: Smith does not appear in 1x06, 1x07 and 1x11 and is not credited) as Monet de Haan, the intimidating and powerful friend to Julien and Luna who serves as the former's PR representative
- Jason Gotay (Note: Gotay is only credited as "Starring" from 1x01 to 1x07, after that he does not appear and is not credited.) as Rafa Caparros (season 1), a Classics teacher at Constance Billard who sexually preys on his students
- Todd Almond (Note: Almond is only credited as "Starring" in episodes he appears in.) as Gideon Wolfe, Max's father and a theater impresario
- Laura Benanti (Note: Benanti is only credited as "Starring" in episodes she appears in.) as Kiki Hope, an athleisure wear designer and Audrey's alcoholic mother. She has a complicated relationship with her daughter following her divorce after her husband's cheating.
- Grace Duah as Shan Barnes (season 2; guest season 1), Zoya's new best friend
- Megan Ferguson as Wendy (season 2; recurring season 1), an administration staff at Constance Billard with a strong knowledge of the original Gossip Girl blog who goes on to help Kate and Jordan run the new Gossip Girl account

The series is narrated by Kristen Bell as the voice of "Gossip Girl", an online anonymous figure, reprising her role from the 2007 series.

=== Recurring ===
- John Benjamin Hickey as Roy Sachs, Max's father who works as a landscaper
- Carla Hall as Rocky
- Donna Murphy as Vivian Burton, the Headmistress of Constance Billard
- Luke Kirby as Davis Calloway, Julien's music mogul father and Lola's ex-fiancé
- Elizabeth Lail as Lola Morgan (season 1), a singer-songwriter and Davis Calloway's ex-fiancée
- Ella Rubin as Bianca Breer, Julien's rival from another school
- Katherine Reis as Pippa Sykes, Bianca's best friend
- Lyne Renée as Helena Bergmann, Obie's mother who is an extremely wealthy real estate mogul
- Malcolm McDowell as Roger Menzies, father of Aki, Jake, Hamish, and Eliza as well as Jodi's ex-husband who is a widely known media tycoon
- Edmund Donovan as Scott, a teacher from another school who's involved in "Gossip Girl"
- Angelic Zambrana as Tati
- Cole Doman as Rex Huntington
- Kathryn Gallagher as Heidi Bergmann, Obie's sister who took Max's virginity
- Amanda Warren as Camille de Haan, Monet's mother and a powerful biotechnologist billionaire
- Anna Van Patten as Grace Byron, the daughter of Virginia state senator, Charlotte Byron and Obie's new girlfriend
- Pico Alexander as Mike Shubin (season 2), a teacher at Constance Billard who just returned from a long sabbatical
- Rick Worthy as Greyson de Haan (season 2), Monet's father
- Jarvis Tomdio as Graham (season 2), Julien's love interest

=== Guest ===
- Jeremy O. Harris as himself (season 1)
- Princess Nokia as herself (season 1)
- Billy Porter as himself (season 1)
- Marc Shaiman as himself (season 1)
- Hettienne Park as Jodie Menzies (season 1), former wife of Roger and Aki's biological mother
- Lucy Punch as Saskia Bates (season 1), Max's surrogate mother and an actress
- Elizabeth Stanley as Charlotte Byron (season 2), Grace's mother and a controversial senator
- Charli XCX as herself (season 2)
- Andy Cohen as himself (season 2)
- LaChanze as Mimi (season 2), Julien and Zoya's aunt
- Lukas Gage as himself (season 2)
- Aaron Dominguez as Phillip Price/Pip/Pablo (season 2)
- Gonzalo Aburto de la Fuente as Alejandro (season 2)

=== Guest characters from Gossip Girl (2007) ===
- Yin Chang as Nelly Yuki, a high-ranking employee at a magazine company and a former member of Blair Waldorf's clique
- Azhy Robertson as Milo Sparks (season 1), Georgina Sparks's son who helps Zoya get revenge on Julien. This character was introduced in the 2007 series played by uncredited child actors.
- Zuzanna Szadkowski as Dorota Kishlovsky (season 1), the Waldorfs' Polish housekeeper
- Wallace Shawn as Cyrus Rose (season 1), Gideon's lawyer and Blair Waldorf's stepfather
- Margaret Colin as Eleanor Waldorf-Rose, a former fashion designer and Blair Waldorf's mother
- Aaron Schwartz as Vanya (season 1), Dorota's husband and former doorman of the van der Woodsens' apartment
- Michelle Trachtenberg as Georgina Sparks (season 2), a manipulative socialite who blackmails Kate. This was Trachtenberg's final television role before her death in 2025.
- Matt Doyle as Jonathan Whitney (season 2), Eric van der Woodsen's husband

== Episodes ==
=== Series overview ===
Season	Episodes	Originally released	
Season	Episodes	First released	Last released
1	12	July 8, 2021	December 2, 2021
2	10	December 1, 2022	January 26, 2023

=== Season 1 (2021) ===
No. overall	No. in season	Title	Directed by	Written by	Original release date
1	1	"Just Another Girl on the MTA"	Karena Evans	Teleplay by : Joshua Safran	July 8, 2021
After the COVID-19 pandemic, weary teachers create an anonymous "Gossip Girl" Instagram account to regain control. They target Julien Calloway, an influencer, and secretly admit her half-sister, Zoya. Julien and Zoya unite but keep their social media history hidden. "Gossip Girl" exposes their secret friendship and implicates Zoya with Julien's boyfriend, Obie. Julien plans to clear Zoya's name at a fashion show, but Monet and Luna scheme to oust Zoya. Julien doesn't help, leading to their friendship's demise. Zoya plans to overthrow Julien, getting close to Obie after he breaks up with Julien. Audrey and Aki develop attractions to Max.
2	2	"She's Having a Maybe"	Karena Evans	April Blair	July 15, 2021
As the teachers prepare for parent–teacher conferences, Audrey is disappointed after her mother, Kiki, fails to show up. Audrey convinces Kiki to attend the school's black-tie fundraiser, but is enraged when Kiki becomes drunk and acts inappropriately. Meanwhile, Obie attempts to form a relationship with Zoya. After "Gossip Girl" posts a picture of the two together, Julien photoshops a picture of herself and Obie together, causing "Gossip Girl" to be denounced as a liar. When it appears Zoya will have to leave the school, Julien steps in to apologize to Zoya and convince their fathers to let Zoya stay. Elsewhere, Max sets his sights on Rafa despite the fact he is a teacher. He makes multiple advances, including making out with Aki at a bathhouse to make Rafa jealous, before Rafa agrees that they can hook up after Max graduates. Audrey then sleeps with Max after she is angered by Aki.
3	3	"Lies Wide Shut"	Jennifer Lynch	Lila Feinberg	July 22, 2021
After a night out, Julien and Max discover Max's father cheating and Julien's father's secret girlfriend, Lola. Obie convinces Nick to let Zoya and Obie go on a date, but Zoya faces backlash online and seeks Luna's help for a makeover. "Gossip Girl" exposes cheating in relationships, causing Audrey and Aki to suspect their affairs with Max are revealed. Max asks Aki to create a fake dating profile as Rafa to catch his father cheating. Max and Julien secretly invite Rafa and Lola to a Broadway play. Max exposes Roy's cheating, then, high and heartbroken, reveals Aki and Audrey's infidelities. Julien and Davis decide not to hide Lola anymore. The school hires an intelligence team to track "Gossip Girl," but Kate and Jordan trick Reema into posting, leading her to take the blame.
4	4	"Fire Walks with Z"	Jennifer Lynch	Courtney Perdue & Baindu Saidu	July 29, 2021
It is revealed by "Gossip Girl" that it is Zoya's 15th birthday, however Zoya dismisses her birthday as it is also the anniversary of the death of her and Julien's mother. Audrey and Aki begin to avoid each other. Max uses drugs and sex to deal with his parents' split, to which he actively pursues Rafa, who isn't appeased. Kate begins to complain about the workload of running "Gossip Girl" and Jordan and Wendy convince her to let them take some of the workload of "Gossip Girl". After Zoya accuses Julien of trying to get her and Nick evicted from their apartment, Julien decides to take her down, with Luna and Monet suggesting she throw a party. Zoya throws her own party in contest with Julien's and enlists the help of Milo Sparks, Georgina Sparks's son from the original Gossip Girl series. Nick and Davis decide to merge the parties together after their daughters attempt to overthrow each other's party. At the party, Julien publicly humiliates Zoya by showing a video, given to her by “Gossip Girl”, which involves Zoya destroying the school property of her old school in Buffalo. Julien realizes how much damage this caused and deems herself a “bully”. Later on, Zoya explains to Julien the backstory of the video and the two reconcile. After avoiding each other for sometime, Aki confides that he think he might be bisexual and he Audrey apologize to each other and make up. In the end, Rafa gives in to Max's sexual pursuits and the two begin a student-teacher affair.
5	5	"Hope Sinks"	Pamela Romanowsky	Aaron Fullerton	August 5, 2021
Obie questions his relationship with Zoya as she becomes distant and befriends Simon. Financial issues force Kiki and Audrey to argue about moving. Pippa and Bianca exploit a gun incident for sympathy, challenging Julien and Zoya at Hulaween. Despite Kate's orders, Jordan continues Gossip Girl, leading Kate to deactivate the account. Aki confronts Max about Rafa, leading to a confrontation. Audrey tries to prevent her mom from meeting Kiki's friends, resulting in humiliation. Julien and Zoya's Hulaween plans are thwarted by Pippa and Bianca, and suspicions arise about Simon. Max discovers Rafa's pattern, confronting him and ending their affair. Luna exposes Monet's betrayal, and Audrey learns about Kiki's hospitalization. Following advice from Nick, Kate sets new boundaries for Gossip Girl, disabling comments.
6	6	"Parentsite"	Pamela Romanowsky	Ashley Wigfield	August 12, 2021
After Davis questions Julien's influencer path post-PSAT failure, she arranges a serious business meeting. Aki and Max struggle with Audrey's worries about Kiki. Kate expands "Gossip Girl," lying to Jordan and Wendy. Jordan posts Kate and Nick, leading to their breakup. Obie's mother disapproves of his breakup with Julien. Zoya clashes with Obie's mother and Aki's father, causing tensions. Audrey accidentally outs Aki but is called to the hospital. Kiki admits to struggling, reconciles with Audrey. Obie protests his mother's company, leading to a clash with Julien. Obie sleeps with Julien after a violent protest. Aki's father exploits his son's sexuality. Rafa spreads lies about Max on "Gossip Girl." Max exposes his affair with Rafa, causing drama. Audrey hosts a thank-you dinner, leading to a night together with Max and Aki.
7	7	"Once Upon a Time in the Upper West"	Joshua Safran	Elaine Loh	November 25, 2021
Aki and Audrey struggle post-threesome, sleeping with Max again. Julien and Obie keep their encounter secret, but Obie confesses love for Zoya and later kisses Julien, revealing conflicted feelings. Max schemes with his birth mother to reunite Roy and Gideon. Rafa locks others out of "Gossip Girl" to conceal affair, blackmailing them. Kiki starts recovery with Audrey's support. Thanksgiving dinner reveals Davis' interference with Nick and Lola's engagement. Aki confronts Obie about post-coming out behavior, damaging their friendship. Max reveals Rafa's actions, filmed by Jordan, leading to Rafa quitting. Lola is uncertain about Davis' proposal. Zoya discovers Julien and Obie's secret, ending their friendship.
8	8	"Posts on a Scandal"	Kenny Leon	Eric Eidelstein	November 25, 2021
Max struggles with exclusive commitment, seeking emotional connection with Luna's encouragement. Obie apologizes for the riot at his mother's company. Julien reconciles with Monet, but tensions persist with Zoya. Aki rejects Obie's attempts to repair their friendship, citing his self-centeredness. Kate, influenced by Jordan and Wendy, posts allegations about Davis being a predator on "Gossip Girl," causing turmoil. Davis denies the accusations, warning of their destructive impact. Zoya clashes with Nick, while Aki discovers his dad knew about the allegations. Julien believes her dad is innocent, but Kate, as "Gossip Girl," continues posting based on Zoya's information. Obie stands up to his mother, reconciling with Aki. Teachers oust Kate from "Gossip Girl" due to perceived loss of objectivity. Julien finds evidence of Davis' questionable actions and confronts him, though he denies wrongdoing.
9	9	"Blackberry Narcissus"	Satya Bhabha	Amos Mac	November 25, 2021
Julien's lawyer deems evidence against her father insufficient, and public opinion turns against her on "Gossip Girl." Julien tricks the account to meet a woman from her father's past, but she refuses to come forward. Audrey encourages Aki to explore beyond Max, leading to struggles. Gideon's new relationship discomforts Max, prompting him to consider honesty with Aki and Audrey. Kate faces frustration and seeks re-entry to "Gossip Girl," backed by Jordan. Julien and Nick ask a famous singer not to come forward about Davis, fearing repercussions on the case. The interaction is misconstrued on "Gossip Girl," sparking rumors of Julien silencing survivors.
10	10	"Final Cancellation"	Craig Johnson	Ryan Koehn	December 2, 2021
Julien faces online harassment after the "Gossip Girl" post, prompting Luna and Monet to suggest a charity party. Organizing proves challenging due to venue reluctance. Zoya's lies to boost attendance lead to protests, resulting in the cancellation of her scholarship. Obie confesses love to Julien, who rejects him. Kiki seeks career revival, and Audrey urges Max to help her, which he reluctantly agrees to. Max aids Aki in a near-arrest incident. Roy's attempt to reconcile with Gideon fails. Audrey and Aki reconsider their stance on Max, but he rejects them for using him. Kate manipulates a teacher to re-enter "Gossip Girl" and undo negative posts about Julien. Lola informs Julien of Davis' breakup and departure.
11	11	"You Can't Take It with Jules"	Erica Watson	JaNeika James & JaSheika James	December 2, 2021
As Christmas approaches, Davis transfers assets to Julien and names her grandparents as legal guardians. Julien's grandmother arrives, planning for Julien to leave the city. Zoya befriends Shan, causing Julien's plan to backfire. Aki and Audrey search for a third but struggle to find someone like Max. Max teams up with Obie to expose his sister's engagement as a lie out of jealousy. Inspired by Shan, Zoya reconciles with Nick and convinces Julien's grandmother to let her stay. Kate, Jordan, and Wendy regain control of "Gossip Girl" and reveal the identities of anonymous sources.
12	12	"Gossip Gone, Girl"	Darren Grant	Kelli Breslin	December 2, 2021
Chaos ensues as people learn who betrayed them to "Gossip Girl," leading to a halt in tip-offs. Julien discovers Obie has a new girlfriend, Grace, prompting Monet and Luna to scheme, but it backfires. Max, affected by his parents' divorce, spirals out of control, finding support from Aki and Audrey. Max admits feeling expendable but later considers a three-way relationship. Davis offers Nick money to help Zoya and him stay in New York, initially rejected but later accepted. Kate criticizes Davis for compromising principles, but he stands firm. Monet plans a coup against Julien, believing she has changed too much. Julien proposes a partnership with "Gossip Girl," offering dirt on peers while trying to uncover the true identity. Kate, as "Gossip Girl," agrees with one condition.

=== Season 2 (2022–23) ===
No. overall	No. in season	Title	Directed by	Written by	Original release date
13	1	"Deb Brawl in a Blue Dress"	Joshua Safran	Ashley Wigfield	December 1, 2022
Julien feeds information to "Gossip Girl" and settles into life at Nick and Zoya's. Kate, frustrated as the sole operator, is ousted by new teacher Mike. Monet schemes to replace Julien's void and disrupt the debutante ball. Zoya feels neglected by Nick favoring Julien, leading to conspiracy with Shan to disrupt the ball. Kate apologizes to Nick and attends the ball to spy for "Gossip Girl." Monet's plans to humiliate Julien are overshadowed by Zoya and Shan's protest, leading to a fight. Kate and Mike record Camille admitting to bribing the school. Max breaks up with Aki and Audrey, but Luna convinces him to let them take it at their own pace. Frustrated, "Gossip Girl" ends her association with Julien. Monet vows to take Julien down publicly.
14	2	"Guess Who's Coming at Dinner"	Joshua Safran	Sigrid Gilmer	December 1, 2022
After avoiding friends, Obie returns to Constance Billiard at Grace's insistence. Monet attempts to establish a social hierarchy, causing conflict with Luna. Julien humiliates Monet, who reveals she manipulated events for publicity. "Gossip Girl" exposes Zoya's lies to Nick, straining their relationship. Rumors about the throuple intensify as Max struggles with others. Aki, Audrey, and Max's plan to mislead "Gossip Girl" backfires, revealing their relationship to Kiki, Roy, Gideon, and "Gossip Girl." Mike seeks to end corruption at the school, confronting Headmistress Burton, who admits and asks to be reported. Kate gets Burton fired against Mike's wishes.
15	3	"Great Reputations"	Sophia Takal	Pilar Golden	December 8, 2022
Monet solidifies her influence at school, vying with Julien for Grace's friendship. Jordan and Wendy encourage Mike to give Kate another chance. Mike connects with Kate over her alcoholic father, hinting at a potential reconciliation. Zoya suspects Nick's dishonesty, inadvertently jeopardizing his job prospects. Shan uncovers Davis financially assisting Nick to stay in New York. Obie meets Grace's Senator mother, Charlotte, who warns against drama affecting her re-election. At an Amnesty International event, Julien reconciles with Obie and Grace to avoid a scene. Monet exposes an influencer for queerbaiting, mending her relationship with Julien. Max, facing reduced status, distributes drugs at the event. Simultaneous issues prompt Charlotte to advise Obie to distance himself from Julien for the sake of his relationship with Grace. After reconciling with Kate, Mike texts an unknown number about getting closer to "Gossip Girl"'s identity.
16	4	"One Flew Over the Cucks's Nest"	Sophia Takal	Amos Mac	December 15, 2022
"Gossip Girl" obtains evidence of Greyson cheating, and Kate informs Camille, who denies the issue. Despite threats, Kate posts the pictures, leading to confrontation. Monet learns her parents are involved with the same woman, facing Camille's anger. Aki's withdrawal raises suspicions of cheating, but he reveals seeking advice about PrEP. Julien exposes Grace's cheating at a party, revealing her involvement with her brother. Charlotte takes Grace away, devastating Obie. Luna advises Monet to be kinder to stay popular, revealing her loneliness. Shan confesses about Nick to Zoya, causing her to move out. Julien vents to Graham, a married man. Kate sleeps with Mike, discovering he aims to expose "Gossip Girl."
17	5	"Games, Trains, and Automobiles"	Satya Bhabha	Ryan Koehn	December 22, 2022
Graham engages in an affair with Julien, who claims to be separated from his wife. Kate and Jordan attempt to uncover Mike's accomplice, but he confesses to being blackmailed. Jordan falls into a trap set by Mike, but Kate warns him in time. Mike accuses Kate of colluding with "Gossip Girl." Nick tries to reconcile with Julien and Zoya, who needs time to process information. Zoya, pretending to be Monet, attends a rave and fears she might be pregnant. Audrey worries about her relationship with Aki and Max. Obie discovers his mother's suspicious dealings and cuts ties. Jordan takes the blame for being "Gossip Girl" to protect others.
18	6	"How to Bury a Millionaire"	Satya Bhabha	Kelli Breslin	December 29, 2022
19	7	"Dress Me Up! Dress Me Down!"	Jennifer Lynch	Tiffany So	January 5, 2023
20	8	"Y Lu's Mamá También"	Jennifer Lynch	Joe Fazzio	January 12, 2023
Luna lands the chance to style Julia Fox for her film's premiere at the Tribeca Film Festival. She discovers her mother, Dolarez, is the movie's star but kept her arrival a secret. Dolarez asks Luna to be her stylist, but Luna is hurt to find out Dolarez already has one. Monet suggests Dolarez might be jealous and urges Luna to attend the red carpet against Dolarez's wishes. Luna is banned from the after-party, leading to more hurt. Luna discovers her grandmother posing as a Spanish maid, revealing Dolarez left her alone in New York at age nine for career reasons. Dolarez admits she supports Luna but can't stand having a daughter. Aki, ignored by Audrey and Max, works at the festival. Audrey plots to ruin Julien at Jessica's shop opening. Zoya and Shan attend the festival to seek Taylor Swift's help against Gossip Girl but instead find Aki kissing his friend. After witnessing Dolarez's behavior, Monet apologizes to her mother and asks Kate to involve teachers in exposing students via "Gossip Girl."
21	9	"I Know What You Did Last Summit"	Joshua Safran	Eric Eidelstein	January 19, 2023
22	10	"I Am Gossip"	Joshua Safran	Sigrid Gilmer & Pilar Golden	January 26, 2023

== Production ==
=== Development ===
WarnerMedia ordered a revival of the series for HBO Max in July 2019. Although called a "reboot", it was revealed to be a continuation of the original story by Josh Schwartz. On November 2, 2020, it was announced that Karena Evans would direct the first two episodes of the series. On September 9, 2021, HBO Max renewed the series for a second season. On January 19, 2023, the series was cancelled after two seasons.

=== Writing ===
The creator and executive producer of the sequel, Safran, says that his priorities for the series are "to focus on stories that are not limited to one demographic". He also stated "I wanted to be more inclusive; I wanted to showcase a more diverse universe; I wanted to tell more queer stories.".

=== Casting ===
In November 2019, it was announced Bell would be returning as the voice of Gossip Girl in the new series. In March 2020, it was reported that Emily Alyn Lind, Peak, Brown, Fernandez and Gotay were cast. Later that month, Gevinson, Doherty, Chanler-Berat and Moreno were reported to have joined as well. In April 2020, it was reported Smith had joined the cast. In August 2020, Jordan Alexander joined the cast in a starring role. In October 2020, Evan Mock was cast as a series regular, while Benanti was cast in an undisclosed capacity. In March 2021, Lail joined the cast in an undisclosed role. In May 2021, Renée joined the cast in a recurring role. In June 2021, Ferguson and Harris joined the cast in an undisclosed capacities. In June 2022, Michelle Trachtenberg is set to reprise her role from the original series as Georgina Sparks in an undisclosed capacity for the second season. In October 2022, it was announced that Grace Duah has been promoted to series regular for the second season.

=== Filming ===
Filming for the series was scheduled to begin in March 2020 in New York City but was put on hold due to the impact of the COVID-19 pandemic in the United States, and as a result, the release date was pushed back to 2021. Production for the series began on November 2, 2020.

Filming for the second season began on February 4, 2022, in New York City. The series was also shot in Rome, Italy, in August 2022.

== Release ==
Gossip Girl premiered on HBO Max on July 8, 2021. The first six episodes of the series aired weekly, while the second slate of six episodes was released on November 25, 2021. The first-season finale was released on December 2, 2021. In June 2021, it was announced that The CW would broadcast the first episode of the sequel on July 9, the day after it premieres on the streaming service, with the episode available to stream on The CW's online platforms after its broadcast. The second season premiered on December 1, 2022.

The series is available to watch in Asia via HBO Go. The series was acquired by BBC One and BBC iPlayer for the United Kingdom. For Canada, it was acquired by Crave. In Belgium, the series was released on Streamz on July 9, 2021. The series was released on Amazon Prime Video India on July 21, 2022.

== Reception ==
On Rotten Tomatoes, the first season holds an approval rating of 38% based on 56 critic reviews, with an average rating of 4.9/10. The website's critical consensus reads, "An ambitious misfire, Gossip Girl stutters more than it struts, stranding a stacked cast in a sumptuous sea of rudderless drama." On Metacritic, the first season has a weighted average score of 51 out of 100, based on 29 critics, indicating "mixed or average reviews".

On Rotten Tomatoes, the second season has an approval rating of 90% based on 10 critic reviews, with an average rating of 7.1/10. On Metacritic, the second season holds a weighted average score of 68 out of 100, based on 5 critics, indicating "generally favorable reviews".

According to Samba TV, 550,000 US households watched the new series in its first four-day streaming on HBO Max.
