= Careful What You Wish For (film) =

2015 film by Elizabeth Allen Rosenbaum

- Theatrical release poster
- Directed by: Elizabeth Allen Rosenbaum
- Written by: Chris Frisina
- Produced by: Ashok Amritraj; Michael A. Helfant; Robert L. Stein; Bradley Gallo; Kirk D'Amico
- Starring: Nick Jonas; Isabel Lucas; Paul Sorvino; Kandyse McClure; Graham Rogers; Dermot Mulroney
- Cinematography: Rogier Stoffers
- Edited by: Padraic McKinley; Geofrey Hildrew
- Music by: Josh Debney; The Newton Brothers; John Debney (main theme)
- Production companies: Troika Pictures; Hyde Park Entertainment; Amasia Entertainment; Roberi Media; Image Nation; Merced Media Partners; Myriad Pictures; Ashok Amritraj Productions
- Distributed by: Starz Digital
- Release dates: April 3, 2015 (Germany); June 10, 2016 (United States)
- Running time: 90 minutes
- Country: United States
- Language: English
- Budget: $4.5 million

Careful What You Wish For is a 2015 American erotic thriller film directed by Elizabeth Allen Rosenbaum, and starring Nick Jonas, Isabel Lucas, Graham Rogers, and Dermot Mulroney. The film was released on June 10, 2016, by Starz Digital. Its plot is heavily inspired by the 1981 film Body Heat.

== Plot ==
Doug Martin (Nick Jonas) is a 17-year-old teenager spending the summer with his parents Emily Martin (Kiki Harris) and Brian Martin (David Sherrill) at their lake house. When wealthy investment banker Elliot Harper (Dermot Mulroney) moves in next door, Doug finds himself immediately drawn to Elliot's young wife, Lena Harper (Isabel Lucas). Elliot hires Doug to work on his sailboat, and this gives Doug an excuse to interact with Lena, who is often alone due to Elliot traveling for business. Eventually Lena and Doug begin an affair, starting with Doug losing his virginity to her. Lena gets them pre-paid cellphones to communicate on, and constantly warns Doug about Elliot's possessive and jealous nature. Lena also shows signs of physical abuse, which she says are from Elliot.

One night Lena calls Doug over to her house, where he finds Elliot dead on the floor. Lena claims he attacked her and she accidentally killed him when she fought back. After some major trepidation on Doug's part, Lena convinces him to help her cover up her part in Elliot's death. Soon after, an insurance investigator named Angie Alvarez (Kandyse McClure) shows up to investigate Elliot's death, due to the US$ 10 million settlement Lena is set to receive from his life insurance policy. Suspicion quickly falls on Doug, and he grows nervous from the increased attention on him by both Angie and the town Sheriff (Paul Sorvino). Eventually he realizes that Lena has been manipulating him the whole time, intending to frame him for Elliot's murder; she claims that instead of a consensual affair Doug had been stalking her and raped her, and then killed Elliot in a jealous rage. Doug's attempts to prove his innocence are thwarted at every turn, presumably by Lena. For example, a gardener of the Harpers who had seen Doug and Lena together turns up murdered before the police can talk to him.

With the police ready to arrest him and with Lena having received the insurance money, Doug follows her to a hotel she is at with Angie, intending to retrieve one of the pre-paid cellphones he and Lena used from her person for evidence. It is there that Doug realizes that Angie is actually Lena's lover and has been her accomplice since the beginning. At first it seems that Lena will leave Doug to take the rap, however in an act of love she decides to leave Doug the cell phone, which contains the exonerating evidence he needs. Angie and Lena flee the country on a private plane.

In the closing voice-over, Doug explains how he was eventually sent to prison, but on reduced charges for a short period of time. Lena and Angie are still on the run. He contemplates if he would do it all over again.

== Cast ==
- Nick Jonas as Doug Martin
- Isabel Lucas as Lena Harper
- Paul Sorvino as The Sheriff
- Kandyse McClure as Angie Alvarez
- Graham Rogers as Carson
- Dermot Mulroney as Elliott Harper
- Marc Macaulay as Gordon
- John Driskell Hopkins as Gus
- Alex ter Avest as Emma Shalloway
- David Sherrill as Brian
- Kiki Harris as Emily Martin
- Jay Potter as Richard

== Production ==
Jake Nava had initially been set to direct the film for Troika Pictures, and shooting was set to begin in July 2010.

In September 2012, it was announced that Isabel Lucas had joined the cast of the film, with Elizabeth Allen directing the film from a script by Chris Frisina, and with Hyde Park-Image Nation, Troika Pictures and Merced Media Partners financing and producing the film. In January 2013, a casting call for the film was held. In March 2013, it was announced that Nick Jonas had joined the cast of the film, portraying a man who starts an affair with the wife of an investment banker. That same month, it was announced that Dermot Mulroney had joined the cast of the film, portraying an investment banker who is married to Lena. In April 2013, it was announced that Graham Rogers had joined the cast of the film, in the role of Doug's best friend. That same month, it was also announced that Paul Sorvino had been cast in the film, portraying a sheriff.

== Filming ==
Production on the film began on April 22, 2013, in North Carolina, and concluded in May 2013. The film was partially financed by $1,193,150 (approximately 25% of the film's costs) in film production tax credits allocated by the State of North Carolina's Department of Revenue.

== Release ==
Prior to production on the film, Hyde Park International sold international distribution rights to the film in Germany, Latin America, Eastern Europe, Middle East, Turkey, Portugal, South Africa and Indonesia. The film aired in Spain on August 22, 2015, to a success of 1.4 million viewers during the first airing. In March 2016, Starz Digital acquired U.S. distribution rights to the film. The film was scheduled to be released on June 10, 2016.

== Critical response ==
On review aggregator Rotten Tomatoes, the film holds an approval rating of 17% based on 24 reviews. The site's critical consensus reads "Audiences yearning for a modern update on the erotic thriller formula will be sorely disappointed by this turgid incarnation, hobbled by stale plotting and a curious lack of sensuality."
