= Soundtrack (TV series) =

2019 American musical drama streaming television series

- Genre: Musical drama
- Created by: Joshua Safran
- Starring: Paul James; Callie Hernandez; Marianne Jean-Baptiste; Jenna Dewan; Jahmil French; Megan Ferguson; Isaiah Givens; Madeleine Stowe; Campbell Scott
- Composers: Andrew McMahon; Zac Clark; James S. Levine
- Country of origin: United States
- Original language: English
- No. of seasons: 1
- No. of episodes: 10

Production
- Executive producers: Joshua Safran; Megan Ellison; Ali Krug
- Producer: Ellen Marie Blum
- Cinematography: Jas Shelton; Tom Clancey; Alex Nepomniaschy
- Editors: Bill Henry; Jo Francis; Allyson C. Johnson; Brad Katz; Lori Ball
- Camera setup: Single-camera
- Running time: 51–60 minutes
- Production companies: Random Acts Productions; Annapurna Television; 20th Century Fox Television

Original release
- Network: Netflix
- Release: December 18, 2019

Soundtrack is an American musical drama television series created by Joshua Safran, that premiered on Netflix on December 18, 2019. The series is executive produced by Safran alongside Megan Ellison and Ali Krug and stars Paul James, Callie Hernandez, Marianne Jean-Baptiste, Jenna Dewan, Jahmil French, Megan Ferguson, Isaiah Givens, Madeleine Stowe, and Campbell Scott. In January 2020, the series was canceled after one season.

== Premise ==
Soundtrack takes a look at "the love stories connecting a diverse, disparate group of people in contemporary Los Angeles through the music that lives inside their hearts and minds."

== Cast and characters ==
=== Main ===
- Paul James as Samson "Sam" Hughes, a widower who works several jobs and has a son
- Callie Hernandez as Eleanor "Nellie" O’Brien, an aspiring artist
- Marianne Jean-Baptiste as Annette Sands, Sam's aunt who is a manager at a restaurant
- Jenna Dewan as Joanna Kassem, a former struggling dancer who is now a social worker
- Jahmil French as Dante Sands, Sam's cousin and Annette's eldest son who recently got out of prison and is a struggling to get a job as a convicted felon
- Megan Ferguson as Jean Dubrowski (assumed name is Gigi Dumont), Nellie's best friend
- Isaiah Givens as Barry Hughes, Sam and Nellie's six-year-old son who is having a hard time coping with his mother's death
- Madeleine Stowe as Margot Weston, Nellie's mother and Sam's mother-in-law
- Campbell Scott as Frank O’Brien, Nellie's father

=== Recurring ===
- Christina Milian as De'Andra Green, Dante's ex-girlfriend who is in medical school and married to a doctor
- Juliet G. James as Leah Sands, Annette's youngest daughter who is a high school student
- Robbie Fairchild as Troy, as Nellie and Gigi's friend
- Deron J. Powell as Arthur
- Sammy A. Publes as Mr. Hernandez
- Brian Keys as Carver
- Amy J. Carle as Stella, Joanna's colleague
- James McDaniel as Moses, Barry's soccer coach and Annette's love interest

=== Guest ===
- Leonard Wu as Stephen

== Production ==
=== Development ===
On January 19, 2018, it was announced that Fox had given the production a pilot order. The pilot episode was written by Joshua Safran who was also set to executive produce alongside Megan Ellison and Sue Naegle. Ali Krug was set as a co-executive producer. Production companies involved with the pilot were expected to include Annapurna Television. On February 8, 2018, it was reported that Jesse Peretz would direct the pilot.

On May 11, 2018, Safran announced on Twitter that Fox had passed on the pilot and declined to order the production to series. Later that month, it was confirmed that the production was being shopped to other potential outlets. On July 2, 2018, it was announced that Netflix had given the production a straight-to-series order for a first season consisting of ten episodes. It was also reported that Ali Krug would now serve as an executive producer and that 20th Century Fox Television and Fox 21 Television Studios were now serving as additional production companies for the series. On January 31, 2020, it was announced that the series was canceled after one season.

=== Casting ===
In February 2018, it was announced that Madeleine Stowe and Callie Hernandez had joined the pilot's main cast. In March 2018, it was reported that Megan Ferguson, Jenna Dewan, Raúl Castillo had also joined the main cast of the pilot. Alongside the announcement of the series order in May 2018, it was reported that Castillo's role would be recast. On December 13, 2018, it was announced that Paul James had been cast to replace Castillo.

== Episodes ==
No.	Title	Directed by	Written by	Original release date	Prod. code
1	"Track 1: Nellie and Sam"	Jesse Peretz	Joshua Safran	December 18, 2019	1LBK01
2	"Track 2: Joanna and Nellie"	Karen Gaviola	Beth Schacter	December 18, 2019	1LBK02
3	"Track 3: Sam and Dante"	Ti West	Khiyon Hursey; Harrison Richlin	December 18, 2019	1LBK03
4	"Track 4: Margot and Frank"	Joe Swanberg	Joshua Safran	December 18, 2019	1LBK04
5	"Track 5: Dante and Annette"	Ti West	Lauren Yee	December 18, 2019	1LBK05
6	"Track 6: Joanna and Eleanor"	Darren Grant	Richard Kramer	December 18, 2019	1LBK06
7	"Track 7: Sam and Frank"	Joe Swanberg	Lauren Yee; Khiyon Hursey; Harrison Richlin	December 18, 2019	1LBK07
8	"Track 8: Gigi and Jean"	Joshua Safran	Allyn Rachel	December 18, 2019	1LBK08
9	"Track 9: Margot and Annette"	Darren Grant	Korde Tuttle	December 18, 2019	1LBK09
10	"Track 10: Finale"	Karen Gaviola	Joshua Safran; Beth Schacter	December 18, 2019	1LBK10

== Reception ==
On Rotten Tomatoes, the series holds an approval rating of 44% with an average rating of 4.83/10, based on 9 reviews. On Metacritic, it has a weighted average score of 58 out of 100, based on 4 critics, indicating "mixed or average reviews".
