= Grace Duah =

American actress

- Born: 1997 (age 27–28); Virginia, United States
- Occupation: Actress
- Years active: 2020–present

Grace Duah is an American actress. She is best known for playing Shan Barnes in the HBO Max teen drama series Gossip Girl.

== Early life ==
Harris was born in Virginia to first generation Ghanaian parents. Her parents moved to the states when her mother was 5-6 months pregnant with her. Both of her parents worked as nurses. Originally planning on becoming an engineer she was inspired to get into acting after her theater teacher in high school told her she could become a star. She attended Pace University in New York City to study screen acting, graduating in 2020.

== Career ==
Prior to starting out as an actress Duah worked as a personal assistant on The Late Show With Stephen Colbert and in marketing for six months at BET. Her biggest role so far has been playing Shan Barnes in Gossip Girl. She revealed she was crying after she got the phone call saying she got the role. Originally cast to be a guest star she was upped to a series regular for season 2.

== Personal life ==
Her favourite actors are Keke Palmer and Daniel Kaluuya, who is also her celebrity crush. Her favourite songs are Got to Be Real by Cheryl Lynn and Ku Lo Sa by the Nigerian singer Oxlade. She can't swim.

== Filmography ==
=== Film ===
Year	Title	Role	Notes
2020	Want This	Grace	Short
2023	Memoirs of a Bruised Mind	April Bailey	Short
2024	Meal Ticket	Kim	Short
2025	The Off-Brands	Constance McKinney	Short

=== Television ===
Year	Title	Role	Notes
2021-2023	Gossip Girl	Shan Barnes	9 episodes
