= Megan Ferguson =

American actress (born 1982/1983)

- Born: 1982 or 1983 (age 42–43)
- Education: Yale University
- Occupation: Actress
- Spouse: Nico Evers-Swindell (m. 2011)
- Children: 2

Megan Ferguson (born 1982 or 1983) is an American actress.

== Personal life ==
In 2011, Ferguson married fellow actor Nico Evers-Swindell.

== Filmography ==
=== Film ===
Year	Title	Role	Notes
2007	American Fork	Young and Plain	
2010	Love & Other Drugs	Farrah	
2013	A Likely Story	Rosalind	Short
2014	Let's Get Digital	Rachel	Short
2014	Are You Talking About Bey and Jay?		Short
2016	The Fundamentals of Caring	Peaches	
2016	Bad Moms	Tessa	
2017	Handsome	Amanda	
2017	Suburbicon	June	
2017	The Disaster Artist	Jessie	
2018	Maude	Priscilla	Short
2020	The Broken Hearts Gallery	Randy	
2025	The Housemaid	Jilianne	

=== Television ===
Year	Title	Role	Notes
2010	Boardwalk Empire	Claudia	"The Ivory Tower"
2010	Law & Order: LA	Toni Parre	"Hollywood"
2011	Happily Divorced	Monica	"Anniversary"
2011	Hound Dogs	Maybird	Television film
2012	The Frontier	Peyton	Television film
2012–2015	Hart of Dixie	Daisy Conover	6 episodes
2013	Mad Men	Aimee Swenson	2 episodes
2013	Almost Human	Maya Vaughn	"Blood Brothers"
2013	Dumb Girls	Cassie	TV film
2014	The League	Crazy Tiffany	"Ménage à Cinq"
2015	Battle Creek	Tina	"Old Flames"
2015	The Comedians	Esme	Main role
2015	The Walker		"Real Friends Do Brunch"
2015	Good at Life	Becca	Television film
2016	The Skinny	Brie	Miniseries
2016	Sebastian Says	Chloe	Television film
2017	Love	Natasha	"The Long D"
2017–2019	Easy	Samantha	2 episodes
2017–2018	Grace and Frankie	Nadia	3 episodes
2018	9-1-1	Melora	"Heartbreaker"
2018	Casual	Rita	"4.1"
2018–2020	Dream Corp, LLC	Bea	15 episodes
2018	The Cool Kids	Jennifer	"Margaret Turns 65"
2019	LA's Finest	Michelle Walker	Farewell..."
2019	Soundtrack	Gigi Dumont	Main role
2020	Curb Your Enthusiasm	Alice	4 episodes
2020	Upload	Mildred Kannerman	"Welcome to Upload"
2021–2023	Gossip Girl	Wendy	Main role (season 2); recurring (season 1)
