= Rick Cosnett =

Australian actor (born 1983)

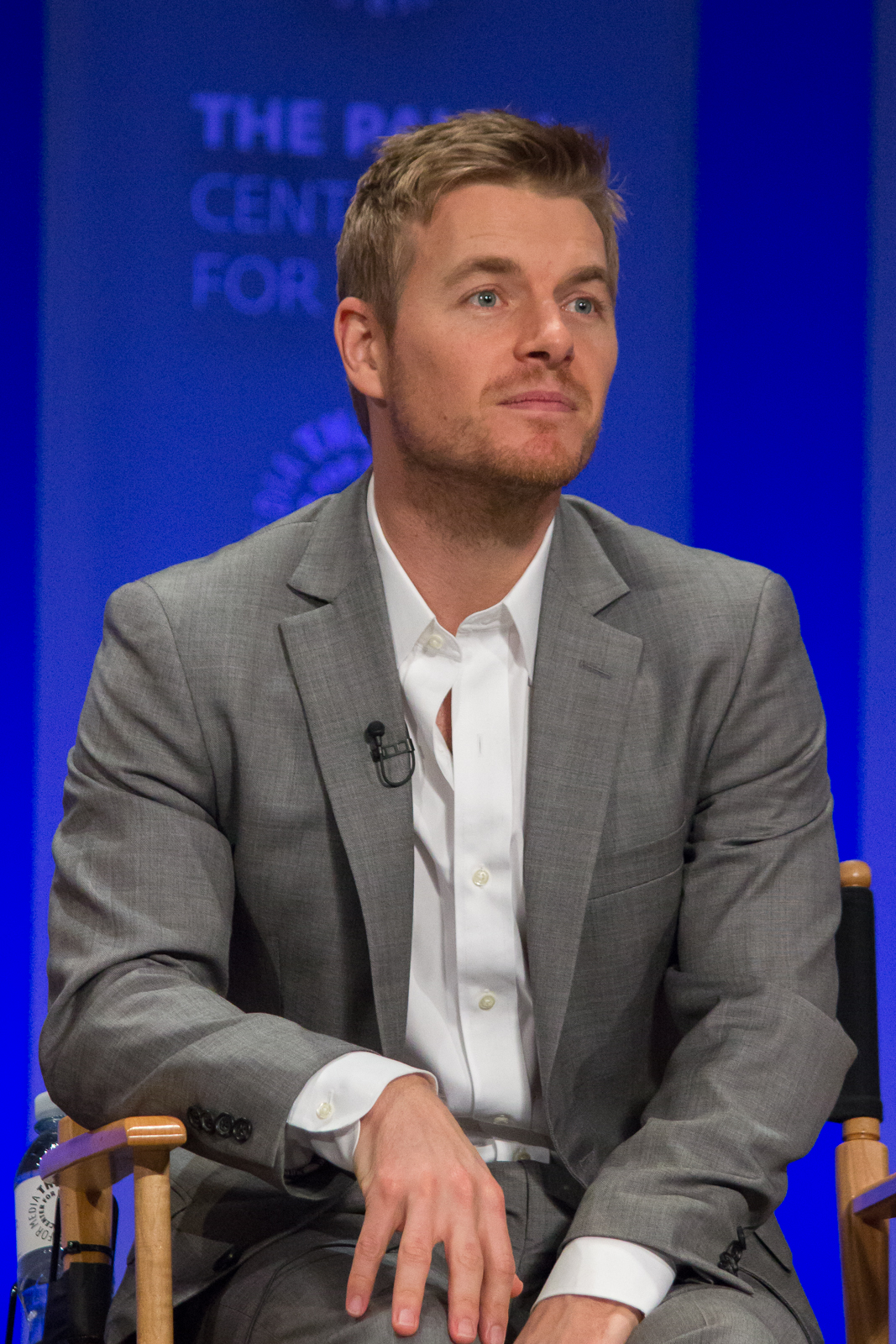
- Cosnett in 2015
- Born: Richard James Cosnett; 6 April 1983 (age 43); Chegutu, Zimbabwe
- Occupations: Actor, producer
- Years active: 2004–present
- Relatives: Hugh Grant (third cousin)

Richard James Cosnett (born 6 April 1983) is a Zimbabwean-Australian actor and producer. He is known for playing the roles of Wes Maxfield in The Vampire Diaries, Elias Harper in Quantico, Eddie Thawne in The Flash and voicing Prince Ahzrak in the 2025 video game Doom: The Dark Ages.

== Early life and education ==
Cosnett was born on 6 April 1983 and was raised on a farm in Chegutu, Zimbabwe. His family took part in community musical theater there, which made him interested in acting from an early age. When he was seventeen, his family decided to move to Queensland, Australia, in large part due to land reforms in Zimbabwe.

Cosnett attended the Queensland University of Technology in Brisbane. He originally received a scholarship to study music but graduated with a Bachelors of Fine Arts in Acting.

== Personal life ==
Cosnett is a third cousin of Hugh Grant. On 13 February 2020, Cosnett publicly came out as gay on his Instagram account.

== Filmography ==
Key
‡	Denotes works that have not yet been released

=== Film ===
Year	Title	Role	Notes
2006	The Bet	Mike Voss	
2008	The Terrorist	Dave	short
2009	The Neighbour		short
2010	The Elephant in the Room	Curtis	short
2012	The Timing of Love	Simon	
2013	Continuing Fred	Brian	
2017	Zim High	Hawk	
2017	Happily Never After	Josh	TV movie
2017	Skybound	Matt	
2018	El Mirador	Ryan	
2019	I Miss You	Chase	
2019	The Wrong Husband	Derrick / Alex	TV movie
2019	Softer	Charlie	short
2021	The Border	Vince	short
2022	Master Gardener	Stephen Collins	
2022	To Go to the Moon	Thomas	short
2023	Shoulder Dance	Roger	
2023	TV in Bed	Ty Kirby	
2024	The Holiday Exchange	Oliver Whitlock	TV movie

=== Television ===
Year	Title	Role	Notes
2004	Forensic Investigators	Mal Henshall	3 episodes
2005	headLand	Brad Partridge	3 episodes
2007	East West 101	Greg Small	Episode: Death at the Station
2008	The Trojan Horse	Will Tullman	2 episodes
2008–2009	The New Inventors	The Inventor	5 episodes
2013–2014	The Vampire Diaries	Dr. Wesley "Wes" Maxfield	Recurring role (season 5)
2014–2017, 2022–2023	The Flash	Eddie Thawne / "Malcolm Gilmore" / Cobalt Blue	Main cast (season 1); Special guest star (seasons 2–3, 8–9); 33 episodes
2015–2016	Quantico	Elias Harper	Recurring role (season 1)
2016	Castle	Victor Crowne	Episode: "Hell to Pay"
2018	NCIS	Sean Parks	Episode: "Fallout"
2024-2026	Palm Royale	Sergeant Tom Sanka	5 episodes (Season 1); 5 episodes (Season 2)
2024	9-1-1	Julian Enes	Recurring role (season 7)
2024–2025	Doctor Odyssey	Corey	7 episodes

=== Video game ===
Year	Title	Role	Notes
2025	Doom: The Dark Ages	Prince Ahzrak	

=== As producer ===
Year	Title	Cast	Language	Notes
2016	The Letter Carrier	Candus Churchill, Julia Harnett, Tyler Layton-Olson	English	
