= Graham Rogers (actor) =

American actor

- Born: December 17, 1990 (age 35); West Chester, Pennsylvania, U.S.
- Occupation: Actor
- Years active: 2009–present
- Spouse: Synnøve Årdal (m. 2025)

Graham Rogers (born December 17, 1990) is an American actor, known for his roles as Scott Thomas in the comedy film Struck by Lightning (2012), Danny Matheson in NBC's science fiction series Revolution, Al Jardine in the biopic Love and Mercy (2014), Carson in the thriller Careful What You Wish For (2015), and Tyler Stone in Hulu's comedy series Resident Advisors.

Rogers had a recurring role as Evan Chapin in the Netflix series Atypical, and previously starred as Caleb Haas in ABC's drama-thriller series Quantico. He appears as Tyler, son of lead character Leanne on the Netflix comedy Leanne, which debuted in July 2025.

== Early life ==
Rogers was born in West Chester, Pennsylvania, to John and Susan Rogers. He has four siblings: one older sister, two older brothers, and one younger brother. Rogers attended West Chester East High School. When he was eighteen, he moved to Los Angeles, California, to pursue an acting career.

== Career ==
Rogers made a guest appearance in an episode of the TNT drama series Memphis Beat. In 2012, he played Scott Thomas, a flamboyant member of Clover High's drama department, in the film Struck by Lightning. In 2013, Rogers co-starred as Henry Iris in the film Crazy Kind of Love, which is also known as Long Time Gone. He then landed a television role as Danny Matheson in the NBC drama series Revolution. In 2014, Rogers appeared in a biographical film about the life of singer-songwriter Brian Wilson of The Beach Boys, Love and Mercy. The following year, Rogers co-starred in the independent thriller film Careful What You Wish For (2015), alongside Nick Jonas. That same year, he had a main role in the Hulu comedy series Resident Advisors as Tyler Stone. Also in 2015, Rogers was cast in ABC's thriller series Quantico, portraying FBI recruit Caleb Haas. In 2017, Rogers had a recurring role as Smitty in the fifth season of Showtime's crime drama series Ray Donovan. On April 2, 2018, it was announced by Deadline, that Rogers was promoted to a series regular role, ahead of the premiere of the sixth season of Ray Donovan.

== Personal life ==
Rogers dated Pretty Little Liars star Lucy Hale, which was revealed by her in an interview with Us Weekly. In July 2013, it was rumored that the couple had ended their relationship after 3 months. He married Norwegian model Synnøve Årdal in 2025.

== Filmography ==
=== Film ===
Year	Title	Role	Notes
2011	1313: Haunted Frat	Brad	
2012	Struck by Lightning	Scott Thomas	
2013	Crazy Kind of Love	Henry Iris	
2014	Almost aWake	Johndra	Short film
2014	Love and Mercy	Al Jardine	
2015	Careful What You Wish For	Carson	
2017	1 Mile to You	Kevin	
2023	Girl You Know It's True	Todd Headlee	

=== Television ===
Year	Title	Role	Notes
2011	Memphis Beat	Damon Eagan	Episode: "Flesh and Blood"
2012–2013	Revolution	Danny Matheson	Main role (season 1)
2014	Red Zone	Jake Jordan	Television movie
2015	Zombie Basement	Guffy	2 episodes
2015	Resident Advisors	Tyler Stone	Main role
2015–2017	Quantico	Caleb Haas	Main role (season 1); guest role (season 2)
2017–2021	Atypical	Evan Chapin	Recurring role
2017–2020	Ray Donovan	Smitty	Recurring role (season 5); main role (season 6–7)
2017	Angie Tribeca	Eric	Episode: "Murder Gras"
2017	Silicon Valley	Bryce	Episode: "The Blood Boy"
2017	SMILF	Casting Director	Episode: "A Box of Dunkies and Two Squirts of Maple Syrup"
2018	Love	Mike	Episode: "Bertie's Birthday"
2018–2019; 2021	The Kominsky Method	Jude	Recurring role
2022	Ray Donovan: The Movie	Smitty	Television movie
2024	High Potential	Kyle	Episode: "Dirty Rotten Scoundrel"
2025	Doctor Odyssey	Sam	Episode: "Sophisticated Ladies Week"
2025–2026	Leanne	Tyler	Main role (season 1); recurring (season 2)
