= Gideon Yago =

American television reporter

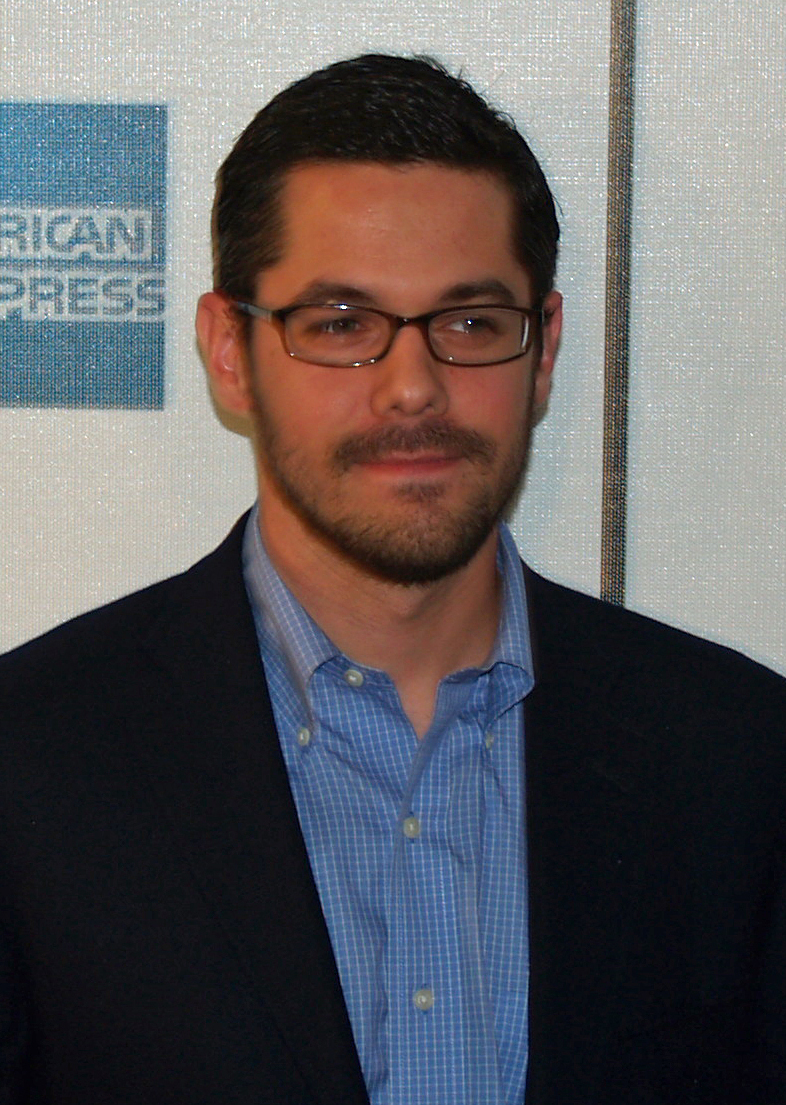
- Yago in 2007
- Born: February 19, 1978 (age 48); Madison, Wisconsin
- Education: Columbia University (BA)
- Known for: MTV News Correspondent

Gideon Yago (born February 19, 1978) is an American writer and former correspondent for MTV News and CBS News though he is most recognized for his contributions to MTV.

== Background ==
Yago was born in Madison, Wisconsin to a German-born, Roman Catholic mother and a Jewish father who met in Israel. His mother was a psychoanalyst and his father an economist. He grew up in Queens, New York and graduated from the Kew-Forest School where he wrote and published a zine called Corpuscle. He graduated from Columbia University, where he was a member of the Philolexian Society, and began working for MTV News during the presidential election of 2000. At the age of 21, during the end of his senior year at Columbia, he had a full-time position at MTV.

== Career ==
=== Journalism ===
Initially, Yago worked primarily as a writer for the MTV News department. From 2002-2003, Yago wrote and produced the MTV News magazine The Wrap on MTV2. As his time at MTV progressed, Yago switched gears and began focusing on politics, rather than music, on MTV News. Yago has worked on award-winning documentaries on sexual health, the 9/11 attacks, fighting in Afghanistan, hate crimes, the 2000 and 2004 elections, and the war in Iraq. These awards include: 2003 Peabody Award Winner for his programming on MTV's "Fight For Your Rights: Protect Yourself" sexual health campaign, a 2004 Emmy for MTV's Choose or Lose Programming, 2006 Emmy nomination for web coverage of the 2005 earthquake in Kashmir. In 2005 Yago covered the aftermath of Hurricane Katrina in New Orleans and the devastating Kashmir earthquake in Pakistan and India.

Towards the end of his career at MTV, Yago devoted most of his time to covering issues surrounding the Iraq War and its effect on young veterans. In 2004 he told Charlie Rose he thought the war was the top issue for young people in America. His 2006 MTV Special "Iraq Uploaded" unintentionally helped change Pentagon policy denying wartime access to social networking sites as MTV is the only non-filesharing or social networking site mentioned in the subsequent ban. Yago also discussed Iraq Uploaded with Stephen Colbert in August 2005.

After years as a full-time member of MTV News, Yago left the network in January 2007 writing:

"We are lucky to have an audience that treats us as peers. Though it might be seductive to play the short game with their trust in return for stacked favors and immediate gains, please keep fighting for them and thinking of them in the fine work that you all do. They deserve as much."

Throughout his career Yago has interviewed many politicians, musicians, and other celebrities including former president George W. Bush, former president Bill Clinton, former senator John Kerry, former secretary of state Colin Powell, former vice president Al Gore, and Senator John McCain, as well as other prominent figures, including former ambassador L. Paul Bremer III and Bill Gates. Yago's writing has appeared in Spin, Rolling Stone, and VICE magazines. Several of Yago's pieces of writing have later become the basis for documentary material. For example, his 2003 article "No War For Heavy Metal" became the basis for Vice Film's 2007 documentary "Heavy Metal in Baghdad". Also, Yago's piece for PRI's "This American Life" about a teenaged propagandist for Saddam Hussein became the basis for their "Talk To An Iraqi" segment on the second season of "This American Life" on Showtime.

=== Writer ===
In 2006 Focus Features acquired his script "Underdog" about veterans returning home from war. It has no set production or release date. Yago also completed a short series with IFC. The IFC Media Project is "a user's guide to how the news gets made" promising to expose the tactics used by media giants to "sell" the news. Yago returned as host of the second season of The IFC Media Project, in May 2009.

Yago co-wrote the third episode of The Newsroom with Aaron Sorkin, entitled "The 112th Congress." He also worked on Narcos, Quantico and the finale of series one of The Mosquito Coast.
