= Resident Advisors (TV series) =

- Genre: Sitcom
- Created by: Alex J. Reid; Taylor Jenkins Reid; Natalia Anderson
- Starring: Andrew Bachelor; Jamie Chung; Juliette Goglia; Ryan Hansen; Alison Rich; Graham Rogers; Romy Rosemont
- Composer: Emeen Zarookian
- Country of origin: United States
- Original language: English
- No. of seasons: 1
- No. of episodes: 7

Production
- Executive producers: Michael Petok; Natalia Anderson; Elizabeth Banks; Max Handelman; Ira Ungerleider
- Producer: Danny Harris
- Camera setup: Single-camera
- Running time: 21–23 minutes
- Production companies: Brownstone Productions; 301 Productions; Relief Productions; Paramount Digital Entertainment; Hulu Originals

Original release
- Network: Hulu
- Release: April 9, 2015

Resident Advisors is an American sitcom that premiered on April 9, 2015, on Hulu. The series was created by Alex J. Reid, Taylor Jenkins Reid, and Natalia Anderson and follows a group of resident advisors at a college.

== Synopsis ==
The show follows a group of resident advisors in a college dormitory.

== Cast and characters ==
=== Main ===
- Ryan Hansen as Doug Weiner, a 30-something resident advisor (RA) who is pursuing his fifth master's degree.
- Jamie Chung as Olivia Blunt, the no-nonsense Residence Director of Hutcherson Dormitory with aspirations of moving to Silicon Valley.
- Andrew Bachelor as Sam Parker, a smart and competent RA who is putting himself through college.
- Juliette Goglia as Rachel Cunningham, a female freshman who grew up in a polygamist family, and assigned to room with Leslie, a male student.
- Alison Rich as Amy Willard, a quirky and self-conscious RA who loves dogs.
- Graham Rogers as Tyler Stone, the girl-crazy and testosterone-fueled RA in Hutcherson.
- Daryl Sabara as Leslie Flowers, a male student who is accidentally roomed with a female resident, Rachel.

=== Recurring ===
- Romy Rosemont as Dean Berber
- Jacob Wysocki as Jack, Charles
- Vanessa Lengies as Marissa Penson-Weiner, Doug Weiner's ex-girlfriend who is not over him
- Esther Povitsky as Emily White
- Matt Shively as Mike Shelton
- David Del Rio as Ian
- Echo Kellum as Campus Security Officer Dillerson

=== Guest starring ===
- Ryan Malgarini as Beep Hutcherson, the benefactor of Hutcherson Dorm
- Alex Newell as Morgan, a genderfluid freshman
- Chrissie Fit as Squatting Resident
- Hana Mae Lee as PJ (Paula-Jean)
- Anna Camp as Constance Renfro
- Michael Blaiklock as Rooster
- Nicole Byer as Kiki
- Colton Dunn as Fill-In Doug Weiner
- Jayma Mays as Dr. Michaela Roberts
- Elizabeth Banks as Leslie's Penis Doctor
- Brea Grant as Olivia's Bitchy Friend
- Kelley Jakle as Girl Leslie
- Jeff Meacham as Fred Flaterman

== Episodes ==
No.	Title	Directed by	Written by	Original release date
1	"Movin In Day"	Ira Ungerleider	Alex J. Reid, Taylor Jenkins Reid, and Natalia Anderson	April 9, 2015
2	"Sexiled"	Ira Ungerleider	Dave Horwitz and Marisa Pinson	April 9, 2015
3	"Conflict Resolution"	Ira Ungerleider	Ira Ungerleider	April 9, 2015
4	"The Motivational Speaker"	Ira Ungerleider	Alex J. Reid and Taylor Jenkins Reid	April 9, 2015
5	"Alcohol Awareness"	Ira Ungerleider	Alex J. Reid	April 9, 2015
6	"Halloween"	Ira Ungerleider	Taylor Jenkins Reid	April 9, 2015
7	"The Fire"	Ira Ungerleider	Alex J. Reid, Taylor Jenkins Reid, and Natalia Anderson	April 9, 2015
