= Anabelle Acosta =

Cuban actress

- Born: February 28, 1987 (age 39); Havana, Cuba
- Occupation: Actress
- Years active: 2008–present

Anabelle Acosta (born February 28, 1987) is a Cuban actress. She played Annabella in the HBO television series Ballers and Natalie Vasquez in the ABC television series Quantico.

== Career ==
In 2015, Acosta played the recurring role of Annabella in the HBO's comedy series Ballers, she played the role of the girlfriend of Ricky Jerret, played by John David Washington.

Acosta starred as FBI recruit Natalie Vasquez in ABC's thriller series Quantico.

== Personal life ==
In 2018, Acosta began dating former Criminal Minds actor and current S.W.A.T. actor Shemar Moore.

Later on in 2018, Acosta rekindled a past relationship with a Dominican actor, Algenis Perez Soto.

== Filmography ==
=== Film ===
Year	Title	Role
2008	The Next Hit	Hot Bartender
2012	Freelancers	Cyn
2012	Construction	Lori
2012	We Made This Movie	Kelly Acevedo
2014	By the Gun	FBI Agent Sarah Ramsey
2017	Fat Camp	Abby
2019	Kill Chain	The Woman in Red
2020	The Subject	Jess Rivas
2021	Construction	Lori

=== Television ===
Year	Title	Role	Notes
2011	Grace	Eden Grace	TV movie
2012	Breaking In	Phoebe	1 episode
2012	GCB	Lucia	1 episode
2013	Second Generation Wayans	Destiny	1 episode
2013	Perception	Eva	1 episode
2014	Supernatural	Maritza	1 episode
2014	Castle	Holly	Episode: "Law & Boarder"
2015–2016	Ballers	Annabella	Recurring role; 7 episodes
2015–2016	Quantico	Natalie Vasquez	Main role
2017	The Arrangement	Amelia Briggs / Jaq	Recurring role; 3 episodes
2017	Chicago P.D.	Camila Vega	Recurring role; 3 episodes
2019	God Friended Me	Denise	Episode: "Miracle in 123rd Street"
2020	MacGyver	Paula	Episode: "Resort + Desi + Riley + Window Cleaner + Witness"
2021	Thirtysomething(else)	Angelica	Series pilot
2022	The Garcias	Sofia	Episode: "Back to the Roots"
