= Joshua Safran =

American television producer

- Education: New York University
- Occupations: Producer; screenwriter
- Notable work: Soundtrack, Quantico, Gossip Girl and Smash

Joshua Safran is an American television screenwriter and executive producer.

== Education ==
Safran attended the Horace Mann School prior to graduating from NYU Tisch with a Bachelor of Fine Arts in playwriting. He has stated he is Jewish.

== Career ==
Safran was an executive producer and writer on The CW television series Gossip Girl, for which he was the showrunner for the series' fourth and fifth seasons, and was the executive producer and showrunner for the second season of the NBC television series Smash. He shared writing credits with director Shana Feste for the screenplay of the 2014 remake of the 1981 film Endless Love.

Safran was the creator, executive producer and showrunner (seasons one and two) of the ABC thriller drama series Quantico. Recently, he was credited as the creator, executive producer and showrunner for the Netflix musical television series Soundtrack.

He served as creator, executive producer, and showrunner of the 2021 sequel series Gossip Girl for HBO Max.

In 2026, Safran created Line of Fire, which premiered on NBC on September 21, 2026.

== Personal life ==
Safran is openly gay.

== Filmography ==
=== Film ===
Title	Year	Credited as			Notes
Title	Year	Writer	Director	Producer	Notes
Endless Love	2014	Yes	No	No	

=== Television ===
The numbers in directing and writing credits refer to the number of episodes.

Title	Year	Credited as					Network	Notes
Title	Year	Creator	Director	Writer	Showrunner	Executive producer	Network	Notes
Gossip Girl	2007–12	No	No	Yes (18)	Yes	Yes	The CW	
Smash	2013	No	No	Yes (3)	Yes	Yes	NBC	
Quantico	2015–18	Yes	No	Yes (7)	Yes	Yes	ABC	Also consultant (season 3)
Soundtrack	2019	Yes	Yes (1)	Yes (3)	Yes	Yes	Netflix	
Gossip Girl	2021–23	Developer	Yes (5)	Yes (1)	Yes	Yes	HBO Max	
Line of Fire	2026–present	Yes	TBA	Yes	Yes	Yes	NBC	
