= Jordon Nardino =

American television screenwriter

Jordon Nardino is a television writer, best known as the showrunner of Glamorous on Netflix. He has worked on several television series, including ABC's Desperate Housewives and NBC's Smash. He has also worked on Gilmore Girls, Threat Matrix, and, more recently, 10 Things I Hate About You.

He graduated from St. Mark's School (Massachusetts) in 1996 and Georgetown University in 2000.
