= I Can See You (song) =

2023 song by Taylor Swift

Promotional single by Taylor Swift

from the album Speak Now (Taylor's Version)
- Released: July 7, 2023
- Studio: Electric Lady (New York); Rough Customer (Brooklyn)
- Genre: Indie rock; soft rock
- Length: 4:33
- Label: Republic
- Songwriter: Taylor Swift
- Producers: Taylor Swift; Jack Antonoff

Music video
- "I Can See You" on YouTube

"I Can See You" (Note: Officially titled "I Can See You (Taylor's Version) (From the Vault)") is a song written and recorded by the American singer-songwriter Taylor Swift from her third re-recorded album, Speak Now (Taylor's Version) (2023). It is one of the album's "From the Vault" tracks that was intended for but excluded from her third studio album, Speak Now (2010). Produced by Swift and Jack Antonoff, "I Can See You" is an indie rock and soft rock song with elements of funk. Distorted guitars, meandering bass, and synthesizers constitute its midtempo production. The lyrics are sexually suggestive and contain flirtatious innuendos, describing Swift's attraction to a person she comes across often.

The song garnered positive comments from most critics who reviewed Speak Now (Taylor's Version), several of whom found it an engaging listen. It has been highly placed in publication rankings of Swift's "From the Vault" tracks. Commercially, "I Can See You" peaked at number four on the Billboard Global 200; it charted in the top 10 and received certifications in Australia, New Zealand, and the United Kingdom.

Swift wrote and directed the music video for "I Can See You", which premiered on July 7, 2023, at the first Eras Tour show in Kansas City, Missouri. The video depicts a heist by Joey King, Taylor Lautner, and Presley Cash to free the Speak Now-era Swift from a highly guarded vault in a museum. Critics interpreted it as a metaphor for the support from Swift's fans following the dispute over the sale of the masters of her albums. The Grammy Museum at L.A. Live hosted a pop-up exhibit containing costumes and props from the video, in celebration of Swift's six sold-out Eras shows at the SoFi Stadium.

== Background and release ==
The American singer-songwriter Taylor Swift released her third studio album, Speak Now, on October 25, 2010, under Big Machine Records. She released three more studio albums under Big Machine, as per her recording contract, which expired in November 2018. Swift subsequently withdrew from Big Machine and signed a new deal with Republic Records, which secured her the rights to own the masters of any new music she would release. In 2019, the American music executive Scooter Braun acquired Big Machine; the ownership of the masters to Swift's first six studio albums, including Speak Now, transferred to him. In August 2019, Swift denounced Braun's purchase and announced that she would re-record her first six studio albums so as to own their masters herself. She began the re-recording process in November 2020.

On May 5, 2023, at the first Nashville date of her sixth concert tour, the Eras Tour, Swift announced Speak Now (Taylor's Version) and its release date of July 7. She subsequently said in social media posts, "I love this album because it tells a tale of growing up, flailing, flying and crashing ... and living to speak about it". Swift emphasized the hardships she faced in her life during the time she wrote the record, among them "brutal honesty, unfiltered diaristic confessions and wild wistfulness". On June 5, 2023, Swift announced the track-list of the album, which consists of 22 songs. Among them are six "From the Vault" songs that were written for the 2010 album but did not make the final track-list, including "I Can See You". Speak Now (Taylor's Version) was released by Republic on July 7, 2023. On August 3, Swift performed the track as a "surprise song" at an Eras Tour show in Los Angeles. She sang it again as part of a mashup with her song "Mine" (2010) at an Eras Tour show in Liverpool. On August 2, 2024, she performed the track for a third time in Warsaw. It was mashed up this time with "I Can Fix Him (No Really I Can)" (2024).

== Music and lyrics ==
"I Can See You"
A sample of "I Can See You", exhibiting the midtempo production consisting of distorted guitars, meandering bass, and synthesizers.

"I Can See You" has a duration of four minutes and thirty-three seconds. Featuring a midtempo production, it contains distorted guitars with a surf rock guitar riff, which critics described as "choppy" and "edgy". Meandering bass and synthesizers also accompany the track. The lyrics and style have been called sultry, flirtatious, and sexually suggestive. Swift uses innuendos while describing a "cataclysmic" crush, receiving comparisons to Swift's song "Dress" from her album Reputation (2017).

Several critics commented on the sound of "I Can See You". Mike DeWald from Riff Magazine characterized the song as indie rock, while The Independent's Annabel Nugent thought it evokes an "indie-rock mood" that differs from its immediate predecessors. Jason Lipshutz of Billboard and Chris Willman of Variety said the track has elements of funk. Danica Bryant from Universal Music New Zealand dubbed it a soft rock number, reminiscent of the music by Arctic Monkeys and Fleetwood Mac. For Pitchfork, Vrinda Jagota wrote that it sounded more like the "inky, lilting" trap-pop sound of Reputation rather than the overall sound of Speak Now (Taylor's Version).

== Critical reception ==
In reviews of Speak Now (Taylor's Version), "I Can See You" was well-received by most critics. The track was found to be "danceable" by Nugent and DeWald, who also considered it as "a fun change of pace" within the album. Nugent hailed it as the best song among the album's "From the Vault" tracks, and so did Lipshutz, lauding the composition and lyrics and saying that it "would have been an excellent addition" to the original album. In The i Paper, Kate Solomon dubbed the track a "classic". Sputnikmusic's staff Sowing thought it had the most infectious guitar line and rhythm from a Swift song since "Style" (2015). Bobby Olivier from Spin opined that the theme of lust added a new aspect to Swift's songwriting. Laura Snapes of The Guardian was less positive of the track, criticizing it as "actively bad Maroon 5-core".

"I Can See You" was placed within the top five in rankings of Swift's "From the Vault" tracks by Lipshutz, Jake Viswanath of Bustle, Nylon, Time, and Josh Kurp of Uproxx. Variety's Chris Willman listed the song at seventh on a ranking of her bonus tracks, praising Antonoff's production and dubbing it one of the "slinky bops" of 2023 and of Swift's discography. Viswanath opined that the track "wouldn't have sounded this way in 2010" if it was not for Antonoff's "hypnotic guitar riff" complementing the "suggestive pick-up lines". In Nylon, Lauren McCarthy deemed the song the catchiest of the "From the Vault" tracks as well as the sexiest, believing that Swift was so engaged with her lust that "she somehow forgot she was recording a song". Time's Moises Mendez II said that the production brought forth a mysterious atmosphere and thought Swift "perfectly captured" the emotions of a "forbidden love". For Kurp, the song was the one from the album that sounded the most like the band Fall Out Boy and felt that Swift's voice featured an "determined, reserved quality" that was uncommon on the original album.

== Commercial performance ==
"I Can See You" peaked within the top ten in Ireland (4), New Zealand (4), Singapore (7), Canada (8), and Japan (8). On the Billboard Global 200, the song entered at its peak of number four with 52.9 million streams and 6,000 sales worldwide. "I Can See You" and "Back to December (Taylor's Version)" simultaneously marked Swift's 16th and 17th top-ten entries on the Global 200.

In the United States, the song debuted and peaked at number five on the Billboard Hot 100, with 24.7 million streams, 4,000 sales, and 361,000 airplay audiences; it made Swift the first artist since the Beatles in 1964 to chart songs from three different albums in the top ten at the same time. (Note: Other songs by Taylor Swift present within the top ten on the chart were "Cruel Summer" from Lover (2019) and "Karma" from Midnights (2022).) The song is also her 26th top-five entry and the second "Taylor's Version" track to chart within the top 10, after "All Too Well (Taylor's Version)" (2021). In Australia, the song reached number five on the ARIA Singles Chart and received a gold certification from the Australian Recording Industry Association (ARIA). In the United Kingdom, it reached number six on the UK Singles Chart and was certified silver by the British Phonographic Industry (BPI).

== Music video ==
Taylor Lautner and Joey King freeing Swift from the vault in the heist-inspired music video

At the Eras Tour show in Kansas City, Missouri on July 7, 2023, Swift premiered the music video for "I Can See You", with co-stars Joey King, Taylor Lautner, and Presley Cash appearing onstage with Swift; the video was released via YouTube on July 8. Cash and King previously starred in Swift's 2011 video for "Mean", while Lautner and Swift briefly dated and starred in the 2010 film Valentine's Day prior to the release of the original Speak Now album. At the show, Swift revealed that she had come up with the concept for the video over a year and a half before its eventual release. Filming occurred in April 2023 in Liverpool, England, at locations such as the Cunard Building, the Tobacco Warehouse and the National Westminster Bank. She stated that she wanted to create a visual story that depicted how her fans helped her reclaim her music. The video depicts a heist, carried out by Cash, King and Lautner, to rescue Swift, who is imprisoned in a vault. The video is a metaphor for Swift's fans helping reclaim her music following the 2019 public dispute over her masters. Swift directed the video, and Jonathan Sela served as director of photography.

The video received positive comments from journalists. Alexa Camp of Slant Magazine said, the "action-packed" music video saw Swift "take control" of her artistry. Lauren Huff of Entertainment Weekly praised the action theme of the "jam-packed" video. The A.V. Club's William Hughes called it a "barely-a-metaphor" video with outfits and memorabilia from Swift's Speak Now era. To honor Swift's record-setting six sold-out shows of the Eras Tour at SoFi Stadium, the Recording Academy hosted a special pop-up exhibit, titled I Can See You (Taylor's Version), at the Grammy Museum, Los Angeles, from August 2 to September 18, 2023. The exhibit is an immersive experience into the "I Can See You" music video, displaying 11 costumes—all of which were worn by Swift during the Speak Now era—and two music instruments from the video.

== Credits and personnel ==
Credits are adapted from the liner notes of Speak Now (Taylor's Version).

Studios

- Recorded at Electric Lady Studios (New York City) and Rough Customer Studio (Brooklyn)
- Mixed at MixStar Studios (Virginia Beach)
- Mikey Freedom Hart's performance recorded by David Hart at Big Mercy Sound (Brooklyn)
- Sean Hutchinson's performance recorded by himself at Hutchinson Sound (Brooklyn)
- Evan Smith's performance recorded by himself at Pleasure Hill Recording (Portland, Maine)
- Swift's lead vocals recorded by Christopher Rowe at Kitty Committee Studio (London)

Personnel

- Taylor Swift – vocals, songwriting, production
- Jack Antonoff – production, engineering, programming, acoustic guitar, bass guitar, electric guitar, 12-string acoustic guitar, keyboards, synthesizer, background vocals
- Evan Smith – saxophone, engineering
- Mikey Freedom Hart – electric guitar, synthesizer, Wurlitzer
- Sean Hutchinson – drums, percussion
- David Hart – engineering
- Laura Sisk – engineering
- John Rooney – engineering assistance
- Jon Sher – engineering assistance
- Megan Searl – engineering assistance
- Christopher Rowe – vocal engineering
- Serban Ghenea – mixing
- Bryce Bordone – mix engineering
- Randy Merrill – mastering

== Charts ==
=== Weekly charts ===
Weekly chart performance for "I Can See You"
Chart (2023–2024)	Peak position
Australia (ARIA)	5
Austria (Ö3 Austria Top 40)	58
Canada Hot 100 (Billboard)	8
Croatia International Airplay (Top lista)	64
Germany (GfK)	90
Global 200 (Billboard)	4
Greece International (IFPI)	13
Ireland (IRMA)	4
Japan Hot Overseas (Billboard Japan)	8
Lebanon (Lebanese Top 20)	19
Malaysia (Billboard)	22
Netherlands (Single Top 100)	87
New Zealand (Recorded Music NZ)	4
Philippines (Billboard)	13
Portugal (AFP)	62
Singapore (RIAS)	7
Sweden Heatseeker (Sverigetopplistan)	1
Switzerland Streaming (Schweizer Hitparade)	91
UK Singles (Official Charts)	6
US Billboard Hot 100	5
US Hot Country Songs (Billboard)	3
Venezuela Airplay (Record Report)	69

=== Year-end charts ===
Year-end chart performance for "I Can See You"
Chart (2023)	Position
US Hot Country Songs (Billboard)	54

Year-end chart performance for "I Can See You"
Chart (2024)	Position
Venezuela Rock (Record Report)	9

== Certifications ==
Certifications for "I Can See You"
Region	Certification	Certified units/sales
Australia (ARIA)	Platinum	70,000^{‡}
Brazil (Pro-Música Brasil)	2× Platinum	80,000^{‡}
New Zealand (RMNZ)	Gold	15,000^{‡}
United Kingdom (BPI)	Silver	200,000^{‡}
^{‡} Sales+streaming figures based on certification alone.
