= Mean (song) =

2011 single by Taylor Swift

Single by Taylor Swift

from the album Speak Now
- Released: March 7, 2011
- Genre: Country; country pop; bluegrass
- Length: 3:57
- Label: Big Machine
- Songwriter: Taylor Swift
- Producers: Taylor Swift; Nathan Chapman

Taylor Swift singles chronology
"Back to December" (2010)	"Mean" (2011)	"The Story of Us" (2011)

Music video
- "Mean" on YouTube

"Mean" is a song written and recorded by the American singer-songwriter Taylor Swift for her third studio album, Speak Now (2010). Big Machine Records released it to country radio in the United States as the album's third single on March 7, 2011. Produced by Swift and Nathan Chapman, "Mean" is a banjo-led country, country pop, and bluegrass track that incorporates fiddles, mandolins, hand claps, and multitracked vocals. In the lyrics, Swift addresses her detractors, recognizes her shortcomings, and strives to overcome the criticism and achieve success.

Some music critics saw "Mean" as an anti-bullying anthem and praised the production as airy and catchy, while others considered the narrative ineffective. Several media publications have retrospectively listed it as one of the best country songs. "Mean" won Best Country Song and Best Country Solo Performance at the 2012 Grammy Awards, and also received other industry awards and nominations. The track reached the national charts of Australia, Canada, and the United States, peaking at number two on the country music charts in the latter two countries. It received certifications in Australia, Brazil, Canada, New Zealand, the United Kingdom, and the United States.

The music video for "Mean" was directed by Declan Whitebloom, who wrote its treatment with Swift. Featuring themes of self-empowerment and anti-bullying, the video received a mixed response from critics, who generally criticized its viewpoint on bullying as stereotypical and deemed its concept confusing. The video received nominations at the MTV Video Music Awards, the Academy of Country Music Awards, and the Country Music Association Awards. Swift included "Mean" in the set lists of the Speak Now World Tour (2011–2012) and the Red Tour (2013–2014), and performed it on some dates of her later tours.

Following a 2019 dispute regarding the ownership of her back catalog, Swift re-recorded the song as "Mean (Taylor's Version)" for her third re-recorded album, Speak Now (Taylor's Version) (2023). The track peaked at number 33 on the Billboard Global 200 and reached the national charts of Australia, Canada, New Zealand, the Philippines, Singapore, and the United States.

== Production and release ==
Taylor Swift began working on her third studio album, Speak Now (2010), two years before its release. She conceived it as a loose concept album about the things she wanted to tell certain people but never had a chance to. Swift described the songs as "diary entries" reflecting the emotions that assisted her in navigating adulthood. The confessional lyrics she wrote for Speak Now were more straightforward and confrontational compared to those on her previous albums. Swift was inspired by her detractors to write the album's sixth track, "Mean", explaining that although she acknowledged constructive criticism, she was bothered by critics who "attack everything about a person" and were "just being mean". She wrote the song by herself and produced it with Nathan Chapman.

"Mean" was released for digital download on October 19, 2010, as part of a three-week iTunes promotional countdown for Speak Now. Big Machine Records released the track to country radio in the United States on March 7, 2011, as the third single from the album.

== Music and lyrics ==
"Mean"
A sample of "Mean", featuring a banjo-led country and bluegrass production, hand claps, and multitracked vocals

"Mean" is 3 minutes and 57 seconds long. Music journalists regarded it as the most country-sounding track on Speak Now (Note: Crtitics such as American Songwriter's Rick Moore, The Star-Ledger's Tris McCall, The Washington Post's Allison Stewart, Rolling Stone's Grady Smith, and Roughstock's Matt Bjorke) and in Swift's discography. (Note: Critics such as Smith, McCall, Taste of Country's Billy Dukes, The Independent's Roisin O'Connor, and the Boston Herald's Jed Gottlieb) Set over a tempo of 160 beats per minute, "Mean" is a banjo-led country pop and bluegrass song that incorporates several acoustic instruments associated with country music, such as fiddle and mandolin. (Note: Attributed to Stewart, Billboard's staff, the musicologist James E. Perone, and the music analysts Nate Sloan and Charlie Harding) Swift said that the song's prominent use of banjo was a response to criticism that she was "not country enough". The production features an upbeat arrangement, acoustic guitar strums, brush-played drums, hand claps, multitracked vocals, and roots music influences. The music critic Annie Zaleski described Swift's country vocal twang in the song as "overly saccharine". Stephen Thomas Erlewine from AllMusic thought that the country-leaning composition evoked the music of the Dixie Chicks.

The musicologist James E. Perone deemed "Mean" the only Speak Now track that aligns with Swift's self-identity as a country musician, contrasting with the album's dominant mainstream pop and rock music styles. Analyzing the song structure, Perone noted the instrumental sliding up a whole step in open fifths at the end of each refrain, as well as the whole-step slide up from the lowered-seventh scale-step to tonic, which evokes the Mixolydian mode typically found in Anglo-American folk music. According to Perone, the refrain uses a short melodic motif, which creates its catchiness. Toward the end of the bridge ("drunk and grumbling on about how I can't sing"), Swift incorporates a three-note motif in the lyric "I can't sing"; for each word, the three notes descend a short distance (B−G♯) before dropping significantly (G♯−C♯). The music analysts Nate Sloan and Charlie Harding viewed this variation as Swift's signature melodic motif and thought that it captured "the sad cycle of bullying" in "Mean".

The lyrics address the critics who questioned Swift's vocal ability following her live performances in 2009 and 2010. During the verses, she accuses them of pointing out the flaws of which she is self-aware, which makes her walk "with [her] head down" and feel "wounded". In the refrain, Swift promises her detractors that she will achieve success to the point that their comments will no longer affect her; she asserts that she will move to a "big old city" one day, which Perone noted as congruent with a recurring theme in Appalachian music of poor people moving to big cities to escape poverty. Swift concludes by directly confronting her critics at the song's climax: "All you are is mean / And a liar, and pathetic, and alone in life." Writing for the Los Angeles Times, the music critic Ann Powers viewed the track as a reflection on the implications of mean behavior.

== Critical reception ==
Critics praised "Mean" for its airy bluegrass and country production; Mandi Bierly from Entertainment Weekly believed that it rendered Swift's emotions more authentic and emphasized the lyrical narrative. The Village Voice's Theon Weber described the track as "huge, and hugely compassionate, and fearless". Now's Kevin Ritchie and Entertainment Weekly's Seija Rankin picked it as the best Speak Now song, and South China Morning Post's Finley Liu considered it one of the album's standout tracks. Several journalists lauded "Mean" for its themes of self-empowerment and deemed it an anti-bullying anthem. (Note: Critics such as Bjorke, O'Connor, Vulture's Nate Jones, NME's Hannah Mylrea, Billboard's Glenn Rowley, Variety's Chris Willman, and The Philadelphia Inquirer's Dan DeLuca) Glenn Rowley from Billboard dubbed it an "anthem tailor-made for every starry-eyed dreamer who was ever bullied for not belonging". Variety's Chris Willman and Taste of Country's Billy Dukes similarly commended its ability to resonate with various bullying experiences. Critics also praised the production as catchy; (Note: Critics such as DeLuca, Dukes, Uproxx's Josh Kurp, the Wausau Daily Herald's Scott Hansen, Paste's Liz Stinson, Taste of Country's Ashley Iasimone, and iVillage's Donna Kaufman) Dukes particularly highlighted the "irresistible" hook.

Some commentators regarded the narrative of "Mean" as ineffective. Slant Magazine's Jonathan Keefe stated that the song showcased Swift's "lack of self-awareness", criticizing her for focusing on the people who highlighted her vocal issues rather than improving her vocal pitch. Scott Hansen of the Wausau Daily Herald described the track as "counterproductive" and similarly criticized it for "calling out bullies in a way that makes Swift a bully." Kim Hong Nguyen, a scholar in communication arts, regarded "Mean" as a representation of "mean girl feminism" and how white women can reclaim negative traits to assert a feminist identity while simultaneously distancing themselves from the implications of racism.

"Mean" received further recognition in retrospective assessments. It appeared in rankings of Swift's discography by Willman (13 out of 75), Vulture's Nate Jones (18 out of 245), Billboard's staff (20 out of 100), NME's Hannah Mylrea (28 out of 161), Uproxx's Josh Kurp (30 out of 50), The Independent's Roisin O'Connor (50 out of 100), Rolling Stone's Rob Sheffield (72 out of 286), and Paste's Jane Song (82 out of 158). Rolling Stone ranked "Mean" at number 24 on its 2014 list of the "100 Greatest Country Songs of All Time", the highest ranking for a song released in the 21st century. Perone stated that while the ranking was "particularly noteworthy", it was "surprising and at least a little controversial", given that the song achieved a high position in less than five years. In a 2024 update, Rolling Stone placed the track at number 20 on its revised list of the "200 Greatest Country Songs of All Time". Taste of Country named "Mean" the 15th-best country song of the 2010s, and Parade considered it the 50th-best country track of all time. The Tennessean included the song in a 2019 unranked list of the 100 best country songs of all time.

== Commercial performance ==
In the United States, "Mean" debuted and peaked at number 11 on the Billboard Hot 100 chart dated October 30, 2010, the highest debut of the week. This made Swift the first artist to have the Hot 100's highest chart entry in three consecutive weeks, following the debuts of "Speak Now" and "Back to December". The track debuted at number 55 on the Hot Country Songs chart dated November 13, 2010, the highest entry of the week. It reached number nine on the week ending May 14, 2011, making Swift the second female artist to have 13 singles reach the top 10 of the chart. "Mean" reached its peak position of number two on the Hot Country Songs chart issued for June 25, 2011.

In August 2011, "Mean" became Swift's thirteenth song to sell more than one million copies in the United States—more than any other country music artist in digital history. By the end of 2011, "Mean" had sold 1.2 million digital copies and reached number 24 on the year-end Hot Country Songs chart. It was certified triple platinum by the Recording Industry Association of America in August 2014. As of November 2017, "Mean" had sold 2.5 million digital copies in the United States, the best-selling Speak Now track.

"Mean" reached number 2 on the Canada Country chart and number 10 on the Canadian Hot 100 chart, receiving a gold certification from Music Canada. It peaked at number 45 on the Australian Singles chart and was certified double platinum by the Australian Recording Industry Association. "Mean" was certified platinum in New Zealand, gold in Brazil, and silver in the United Kingdom.

== Music video ==
=== Background and release ===
The music video for "Mean" was directed by Declan Whitebloom, who wrote its treatment with Swift. It was filmed over two days at the Orpheum Theatre in Los Angeles. Swift wanted to convey the experience of being bullied by showcasing the stories of others rather than her own narrative, allowing a broader audience to connect with its message. Whitebloom characterized the video as sketches that resemble Broadway performances and are influenced by various time periods, ranging from those reminiscent of the vaudeville era to those that recall the 2000 musical film O Brother, Where Art Thou?. The music video, which stars Joey King and Presley Cash, premiered on Country Music Television on May 6, 2011. Behind-the-scenes footage of the music video's production aired on Great American Country in July 2011 and was included on a Target-exclusive edition of Swift's live video album Speak Now World Tour – Live, released on November 21, 2011.

=== Synopsis ===
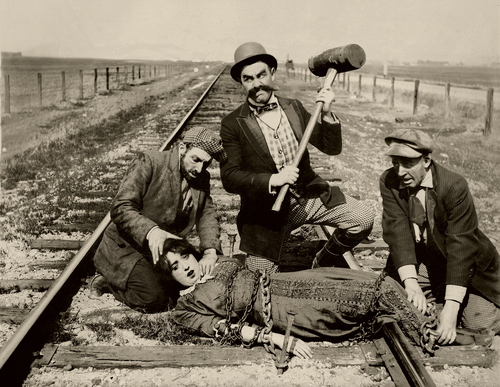
The music video features a damsel in distress imagery.

The music video begins with Swift playing a banjo guitar in a theater alongside her band, all dressed in vintage-style outfits. The video then shows a young male who is being bullied by football team members for reading a fashion magazine. Swift is seen donning a white 1920s-inspired dress, tied to railroad tracks by an antagonist who mocks her with his friends. A young female (played by Cash), earning money for college by wearing a costume to promote a fast food restaurant, is shown being bullied by her peers who throw food at her. Another girl (played by King) cannot join a group of girls during lunch because she is wearing a different colored ribbon around her waist and is forced to eat in the school bathroom.

The theater stage transforms into a luxurious nightclub, where Swift performs in a sparkling flapper dress with her band. The video then reveals that the fashion-magazine reader has become a renowned fashion designer, the restaurant employee has become an executive, and the female with the unique-colored ribbon is the only audience member in the theater, watching and applauding Swift's performance.

=== Reception ===
The music video was met with a mixed response from critics, who generally criticized Swift's perspective on bullying. Kyle Anderson of Entertainment Weekly deemed its narrative confusing and criticized her for likening a professional critic's review to bullying someone for being different. Donna Kaufman of iVillage described the video's characters as "shallow stereotypes" and commented that Swift "doesn't seem at all vulnerable": "Her smirking to the camera about how successful she is, and how much of a loser her imaginary bully is, seems a bit like gloating." In a more positive review, Ashley Iasimone of Taste of Country praised the video's vintage-style aesthetic for complementing its artistic direction. The video's themes of self-empowerment and anti-bullying also received positive feedback within the LGBTQ community, specifically for the part where the young male character becomes a famous fashion designer and is seen presenting a runway fashion show with his designs of women's clothing. Less enthusiastic commentators criticized the depiction of the young male character as weak and overly feminine.

== Awards and nominations ==
"Mean" won Best Country Song and Best Country Solo Performance at the 2012 Grammy Awards, and Choice Country Song at the 2011 Teen Choice Awards. The Nashville Songwriters Association International included the track among its 2011 list of "Songs I Wish I'd Written", voted by the organization's songwriter members. At the 2012 BMI Country Awards, "Mean" was one of the 50 award-winning songs and helped its publisher, Sony/ATV Music Publishing, earn the award for Publisher of the Year. It was nominated for Female Single of the Year at the 2011 American Country Awards, and Song of the Year and Music Video of the Year at the 2011 Country Music Association Awards. The music video was also nominated for Best Video with a Message at the 2011 MTV Video Music Awards and Video of the Year at the 2012 Academy of Country Music Awards.

== Live performances ==
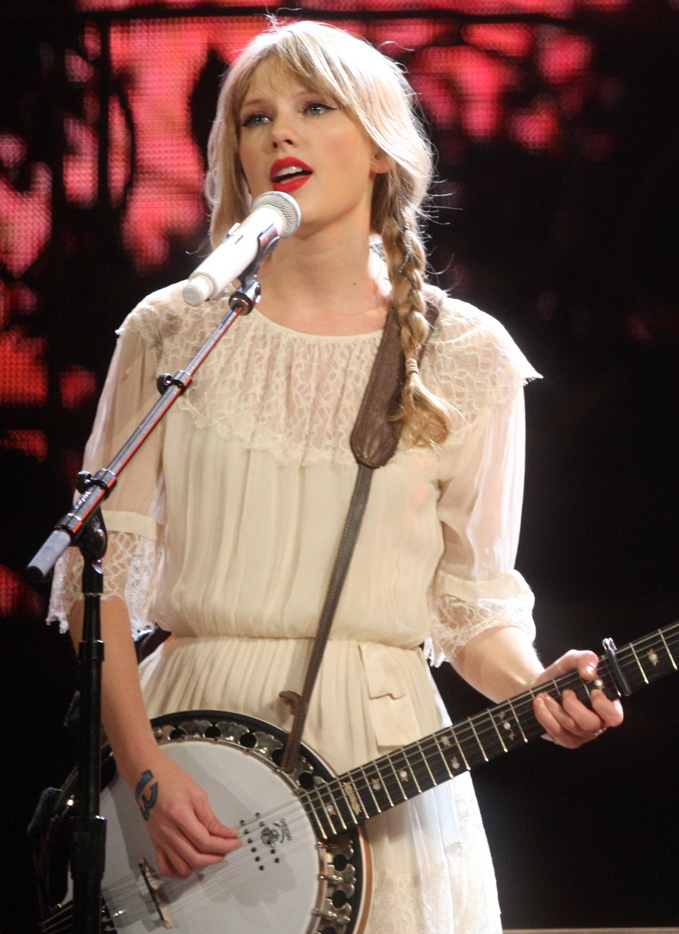
Swift performing "Mean" at the Speak Now World Tour

Swift performed "Mean" for the first time as part of NBC's 2010 Thanksgiving television special, which premiered on November 25, 2010. The special showcased the making of Speak Now along with live performances in New York City and Los Angeles. Swift played the track on a banjo guitar at the 46th Academy of Country Music Awards in April 2011, accompanied by a six-piece band. She performed it on The Ellen DeGeneres Show the next month. Swift sang "Mean" at the CMA Music Festival in June 2011 and June 2013, and at the iHeartRadio Music Festival in September 2012. She played it as part of Late Show with David Letterman and VH1 Storytellers episodes that were taped in October 2012. Swift performed "Mean" at the 54th Grammy Awards in February 2012, changing the lyric "But someday I'll be living in a big old city" to "But someday I'll be singing this at the Grammys". The performance received a standing ovation from the audience.

Swift included "Mean" in the set list of the Speak Now World Tour (2011–2012), where she performed it on a banjo guitar and danced alongside a fiddle-playing band member. The performance was recorded and released as part of the album Speak Now World Tour – Live. She included the song in the set list of the Red Tour (2013–2014) and played it on a banjo guitar. She performed it on acoustic guitar at the 1989 World Tour in 2015 at concerts in Saint Paul, Los Angeles, Seattle, and Houston. Swift sang an acoustic rendition of "Mean" at the first Dublin show of the Reputation Stadium Tour in June 2018; Rolling Stone's Andy Greene picked it as one of the tour's ten best acoustic performances. She performed the track on acoustic guitar at the Eras Tour (2023–2024) at the third Tampa show in April 2023, and as part of a mashup with her song "Thank You Aimee" (2024) at the second London show in June 2024. A recording of the mashup was released in August 2024 as part of a limited-time digital edition of Swift's album The Tortured Poets Department (2024).

== Personnel ==
Credits shown below are adapted from the liner notes of Speak Now.

- Taylor Swift – songwriter, producer, vocals
- Nathan Chapman – producer

== Charts ==
=== Weekly charts ===
Weekly chart performance
Chart (2010–2011)	Peak position
Australia (ARIA)	45
Canada Hot 100 (Billboard)	10
Canada Country (Billboard)	2
US Billboard Hot 100	11
US Hot Country Songs (Billboard)	2

=== Year-end chart ===
Year-end chart performance
Chart (2011)	Position
US Hot Country Songs (Billboard)	24

== Certifications ==
Certifications
Region	Certification	Certified units/sales
Australia (ARIA)	2× Platinum	140,000^{‡}
Brazil (Pro-Música Brasil)	Gold	30,000^{‡}
Canada (Music Canada)	Gold	40,000^{*}
New Zealand (RMNZ)	Platinum	30,000^{‡}
United Kingdom (BPI)	Silver	200,000^{‡}
United States (RIAA)	3× Platinum	3,000,000^{‡}
^{*} Sales figures based on certification alone.^{‡} Sales+streaming figures based on certification alone.

== "Mean (Taylor's Version)" ==
"Mean (Taylor's Version)"

Song by Taylor Swift

from the album Speak Now (Taylor's Version)
- Released: July 7, 2023
- Studio: Blackbird (Nashville); Prime Recording (Nashville); Kitty Committee (London)
- Genre: Country pop
- Length: 3:58
- Label: Republic
- Songwriter: Taylor Swift
- Producers: Taylor Swift; Christopher Rowe

Lyric video
- "Mean (Taylor's Version)" on YouTube

Swift departed from Big Machine and signed with Republic Records in November 2018. She began re-recording her first six studio albums in November 2020. The decision followed a public dispute in 2019 between her and Scooter Braun, who acquired Big Machine including the masters of her albums which the label had released. By re-recording the albums, Swift had full ownership of the new masters, which enabled her to control the licensing of her songs for commercial use and therefore substitute the Big Machine–owned masters. The re-recorded version of "Mean", subtitled "Taylor's Version", was released as part of her third re-recorded album, Speak Now (Taylor's Version), on July 7, 2023.

=== Production and composition ===
Swift produced the re-recording with Christopher Rowe, who recorded her vocals at Kitty Committee Studio in London. David Payne recorded the track at Blackbird Studio in Nashville; Derek Garten provided additional engineering at Prime Recording Studio in Nashville, assisted by Lowell Reynolds. The song was mixed by Serban Ghenea at MixStar Studios in Virginia Beach, Virginia; engineered for mix by Bryce Bordone; and mastered by Randy Merrill at Sterling Sound Studios in Edgewater, New Jersey. Musicians who played instruments include Amos Heller (bass guitar), Paul Sidoti (acoustic guitar), Mike Meadows (banjo, mandolin), Max Bernstein (acoustic guitar), Matt Billingslea (drums, percussion), and Jonathan Yudkin (fiddle). Heller, Meadows, and Billingslea provided handclapping, while Swift, Liz Huett, and Caitlin Evanson provided background vocals. A country pop track, "Mean (Taylor's Version)" is 3 minutes and 58 seconds long. The production has a few differences: the fiddle is mixed lower, the vocal harmonies are softer, and Swift sings without a country vocal twang.

=== Reviews ===
Some critics, such as Amelia Eqbal from CBC.ca and Maura Johnston from Rolling Stone, praised Swift's mature vocals as intriguing; The Daily Telegraph's Poppie Platt felt they "can seem jarring, at first, to hear". The Guardian's Laura Snapes thought that the re-recording sounds "more conciliatory" compared to the original version due to its mature and softer vocals. Mark Sutherland of Rolling Stone UK considered it one of the tracks from Speak Now (Taylor's Version) that retained the intensity that made Speak Now a standout album: "The wounded distress [...] still cuts every bit as deep." Kate Solomon from the newspaper i stated that the re-recording made her appreciate the song's "silly satisfaction".

=== Chart performance ===
"Mean (Taylor's Version)" debuted at number 33 on the Billboard Global 200 chart dated July 22, 2023. In the United States, it reached number 17 on the Hot Country Songs chart and number 39 on the Billboard Hot 100 chart. The track charted in the Philippines (10), Singapore (27), New Zealand (28), Australia (30), and Canada (41). In the United Kingdom, it peaked at number 57 on the Audio Streaming chart.

=== Personnel ===
Credits shown below are adapted from the liner notes of Speak Now (Taylor's Version).

- Taylor Swift – songwriter, producer, lead vocals, background vocals
- Christopher Rowe – producer, Swift's vocal recording engineer
- David Payne – recording engineer
- Derek Garten – additional recording engineer
- Lowell Reynolds – assistant recording engineer
- Serban Ghenea – mixer
- Bryce Bordone – mixing engineer
- Randy Merrill – mastering engineer
- Matt Billingslea – drums, percussion, handclapping
- Amos Heller – bass guitar, handclapping
- Paul Sidoti – acoustic guitar
- Mike Meadows – banjo, mandolin, handclapping
- Max Bernstein – acoustic guitar
- Jonathan Yudkin – fiddle
- Liz Huett – background vocals
- Caitlin Evanson – background vocals

=== Charts ===
Chart performance for Taylor's version
Chart (2023)	Peak position
Australia (ARIA)	30
Canada (Canadian Hot 100)	41
Global 200 (Billboard)	33
New Zealand (Recorded Music NZ)	28
Philippines (Billboard)	10
Singapore (RIAS)	27
UK Streaming (OCC)	57
US Billboard Hot 100	39
US Hot Country Songs (Billboard)	17

=== Certifications ===
Certifications for Taylor's version
Region	Certification	Certified units/sales
Australia (ARIA)	Gold	35,000^{‡}
^{‡} Sales+streaming figures based on certification alone.
