= Run the Tide =

2016 American drama film

- Official poster
- Directed by: Soham Mehta
- Written by: Rajiv Shah
- Produced by: Pilar Savone
- Starring: Taylor Lautner; Constance Zimmer; Kenny Johnson; Johanna Braddy; Nico Christou
- Cinematography: John T. Connor
- Edited by: Rick Grayson
- Music by: Tommy Simpson
- Production companies: Vicarious Entertainment; 1821 Pictures
- Distributed by: Orion Pictures; Momentum Pictures
- Release date: December 2, 2016
- Running time: 96 minutes
- Country: United States
- Language: English

Run the Tide is a 2016 drama film directed by Soham Mehta, written by Rajiv Shah, and starring Taylor Lautner, Constance Zimmer, Kenny Johnson and Johanna Braddy. The film was produced by Pilar Savone and 1821 Pictures. The film focuses on Rey Hightower, a young man who learns that his former abusive drug-addicted mother has been released from prison and is planning on fixing her broken relationship with her two sons (who she has not seen or talked to in six years since her incarceration). Not wanting to have anything to do with his mother, Rey and his younger brother Oliver decide to pack up their bags and run away from home to California to live a better life together.

== Plot ==
A young man named Rey Hightower (Lautner), is a college drop-out who has been raising his ten-year-old younger half-brother, Oliver, ever since their mother was sent to prison for drug-related charges six years prior; her first husband—Rey's father—had abandoned them long before. Rey's high school sweetheart is in town for her late father's memorial service. She has graduated from college and is working for a tech company in San Francisco, while Rey works in his home town at a fuel station. They spend the night together on a lookout tower before her imminent return; she has told him to visit her and she'll help get him started in something (pitying his plight). Their mother has just been released, hopefully rehabilitated, and determined to rebuild their family. Rey acts very bitter toward her, with no intention of reconciling, and while trying to protect his brother, he "kidnaps" him and heads for the California coast; also with the intention of connecting with his hopefully rekindled relationship. Upon visiting her workplace, Rey is rebuffed by his friend, who had been insincere (she is engaged to another) and is surprised he showed up. After a while, Oliver is soon resentful, as he had hoped to bond with his estranged mother. The boys are being pursued by her and her second husband (to whom she was married throughout her incarceration). After soul searching Rey contacts them—not far away as his mom had deduced they were headed for San Francisco from a map poster Rey marked where he dreamed of traveling—and directs them to his and his brother's location. Rey's mother, her husband and his brother Oliver head back home, while Rey strikes out on his own in California, against a panorama of the Pacific Ocean.

== Cast ==
- Taylor Lautner as Reymund Hightower
- Constance Zimmer as Lola
- Kenny Johnson as Bo
- Johanna Braddy as Michelle Turner
- Nico Christou as Oliver Hightower
- David Barrera as TJ
- Derek Krantz as Michael
- K.C. Clyde as Dave
- Paul Sanchez as Big Biker
- Romi Diaz as Angela
- Sean Rey as Buster

== Reception ==
Run the Tide received negative reviews. On Rotten Tomatoes, the film has an 11% approval rating based on 9 reviews, with an average rating of 4.1/10. Metacritic reports a 33 out of 100 rating based on 5 critics, indicating "generally unfavorable reviews".

Dennis Harvey of Variety gave the film a negative review, saying "Tide is smoothly packaged in tech and design departments, but its 90-odd minutes wash over the viewer and recede without leaving a lasting impression."
