= Love Struck =

Single by V Factory
- Released: February 3, 2009
- Length: 4:06
- Label: Reprise
- Songwriters: Darin Zanyar, David Jassy
- Producer: Twin

"Love Struck" is a pop song by American boy band V Factory. It is their first official single from their debut album.

== Song information ==
The song was written by David Jassy and Darin Zanyar. The single was released on iTunes on February 3, 2009.

== Music video ==
The music video for "Love Struck" was released officially on May 22, 2009 on AOL Music.

== Track listing ==
Promo Remixes

1. "Love Struck" (Main Version) — 4:05
2. "Love Struck" (Extended Version) — 6:06
3. "Love Struck" (Jason Nevins Club Mix) — 8:15
4. "Love Struck" (Dave Aude Club Mix) — 7:05
5. "Love Struck" (Tracy Young Club Mix) — 7:55
6. "Love Struck" (Gomi & RasJek Club Mix) — 7:37

== Release history ==
Region	Date	Label	Format
United States	January 25, 2009	Reprise	Airplay
United States	February 3, 2009	Reprise	Digital download

== Charts ==
Chart (2009)	Peak position
Canadian Hot 100	94
Swedish Singles Chart	47
U.S. Billboard Hot Dance Club Play	44
U.S. Billboard Mainstream Top 40	37
U.S. Billboard Pop 100	70
