= Jared Murillo =

American professional dancer (born 1988)

- Born: Jared Makaio Murillo; August 6, 1988 (age 37); Honolulu, Hawaii
- Occupation: Dancer

Jared Makaio Murillo (born August 6, 1988) is an American professional dancer known for his work in the High School Musical series; he was also the lead singer in a boy band called V Factory.

As a member of V Factory, Murillo signed a Warner Bros. Records deal later that year and was under the management of Tommy Page until the group disbanded in 2011.

Murillo trained at the Center Stage Performing Arts Studio in Orem, Utah. He later became a principal dancer and assistant choreographer for Disney's High School Musical and High School Musical 2. In 2007, he performed in a 47-city tour with High School Musical, later dancing on the South American leg of the tour.

Murillo has won several dance titles, including a World and U.S. Swing Championship, and a U.S. Youth Latin Ballroom Championship.

== Strictly Come Dancing ==
Murillo joined BBC One's Strictly Come Dancing as a professional dancer in 2010, staying with the show for one series.

Series	Partner	Place	Average
8	Tina O'Brien	11th	26.8

=== Performances with Tina O'Brien ===
Week	Dance & song	Judges' score				Total	Result
Week	Dance & song	Horwood	Goodman	Dixon	Tonioli	Total	Result
1	Cha-cha-cha / "California Gurls"	5	7	6	6	24	No elimination
2	Foxtrot / "On the Sunny Side of the Street"	6	6	7	7	26	Safe
4 (Note: The couple was excused from competition in Week 3 due to illness, and were granted a bye to the following week.)	Charleston / "You Give a Little Love"	7	7	8	7	29	Safe
5	Argentine tango / "Beautiful Monster"	6	8	7	7	28	Eliminated
