= Prom Night (2008 film) =

2008 slasher film by Nelson McCormick

- Theatrical release poster
- Directed by: Nelson McCormick
- Written by: J. S. Cardone
- Based on: Prom Night by Robert Guza Jr.
- Produced by: Neal H. Moritz; Toby Jaffe
- Starring: Brittany Snow; Scott Porter; Jessica Stroup; Dana Davis; Collins Pennie; Kelly Blatz; James Ransone; Brianne Davis; Johnathon Schaech; Idris Elba
- Cinematography: Checco Varese
- Edited by: Jason Ballantine
- Music by: Paul Haslinger
- Production companies: Screen Gems; Original Film; Newmarket Films; Alliance Films; Prom Productions
- Distributed by: Sony Pictures Releasing
- Release date: April 11, 2008
- Running time: 88 minutes
- Countries: Canada; United States
- Language: English
- Budget: $20 million
- Box office: $57.2 million

Prom Night is a 2008 slasher film directed by Nelson McCormick. It is the fifth and final installment of the Prom Night film series and serves as a reboot, mainly taking inspiration from the original 1980 film. The film stars Brittany Snow, Scott Porter, Jessica Stroup, Dana Davis, Collins Pennie, Kelly Blatz, James Ransone, Brianne Davis, Johnathon Schaech, and Idris Elba. Prom Night follows Donna Keppel (Snow) and her friends during their senior prom as they are attacked by Richard Fenton (Schaech), an escaped convict who murdered Donna's family three years prior.

Prom Night was released in the United States by Screen Gems on April 11, 2008, and was panned by critics, who criticized its predictability and PG-13 rating and compared it unfavorably to the 1980 film. However, the film was a box office success, grossing $57.2 million worldwide on a $20 million budget.

== Plot ==
In Bridgeport, Oregon, high school freshman Donna Keppel returns home one evening to find her father and younger brother have been murdered. She later witnesses her mother being killed by an unseen assailant who later attacks Donna as she tries to get help. The assailant is revealed to be her former biology teacher Richard Fenton, who became obsessed with her during her school term, which resulted in him being fired and given a restraining order. After being arrested, Richard gloats that he'll always "love" Donna and that "nothing can separate us".

Three years later, Donna lives with her uncle Jack and aunt Karen while undergoing therapy for her trauma. She and her friends prepare for their senior prom at a 5-star hotel. Meanwhile, police detective Winn learns that Fenton has escaped from a mental hospital. Knowing he will come after Donna, Winn arrives at the hotel with his partner Nash. Fenton acquires a master card key from one of the maids after killing her and breaks into the friends' shared hotel suite, where he first kills Donna's friends Claire and Michael. Later, Donna's other friend Lisa and her boyfriend Ronnie bump into Fenton on their way up to the suite; Lisa soon recognizes him and runs to warn Donna, only to be trapped in the stairwell by him. Fenton chases Lisa on the mezzanine floor, under construction for repairs, where he slits her throat.

Winn finds the body of the man whose name Fenton has been using in the trunk of the man's car in the parking lot of the hotel. Winn then goes up to the room Fenton booked and finds the maid's body. As Winn has the hotel evacuated, Donna goes back up to her room to find Lisa and retrieve her mother's shawl; while there, she runs into Fenton and escapes. One of Donna's classmates, Chrissy, who was vying for prom queen and organized the prom to be held at the hotel, discovered that Lisa was elected to win the crown, much to her dismay. The SWAT team search the hotel but find no sign of him. Winn soon realizes that Fenton slipped past them disguised as a bellhop.

Donna and her boyfriend Bobby are escorted back to Donna's house, where Winn orders back up protection. Inside, Donna has a dream that Fenton is in the bathroom with her. Waking up, she goes to the bathroom and closes the window. Upon heading back into her bedroom, Donna discovers Bobby's corpse, his throat slashed. She retreats to her closet to hide, only to find Fenton inside already. Winn shows up and looks for Fenton, realizing his partner Nash is dead. Donna tries to escape Fenton; as he is about to stab her, Winn shoots Fenton several times, killing him for good.

== Cast ==
- Brittany Snow as Donna Keppel
- Scott Porter as Bobby Jones
- Jessica Stroup as Claire Davis
- Dana Davis as Lisa Hines
- Collins Pennie as Ronnie Heflin
- Kelly Blatz as Michael Allen
- James Ransone as Detective Nash
- Brianne Davis as Crissy Lynn
- Kellan Lutz as Rick Leland
- Mary Mara as Mrs. Waters
- Ming-Na Wen as Dr. Elisha Crowe
- Johnathon Schaech as Richard Fenton
- Idris Elba as Detective Winn
- Jessalyn Gilsig as Aunt Karen Turner
- Linden Ashby as Uncle Jack Turner
- Jana Kramer as April
- Rachel Specter as Taylor
- Valeri Ross as Mrs. Hines
- Lori Heuring as Mrs. Keppel
- Nicholas James (credited as Nick James) as Denny Harper
- Joshua Leonard as Bellhop

== Production ==
The film was originally announced in 2004 with the script being written by Stephen Susco. The final script was written by J. S. Cardone. The budget for the film was $20 million. It was produced by Original Film and Newmarket Films in association with Alliance Films, which holds the rights to the original franchise, along with sequel rights.

The film was mostly shot in Los Angeles, with overhead shots taking place in Newport, Oregon.

== Release ==
Prom Night was released by Sony Pictures and Screen Gems. The film grossed $20,804,941 in 2,700 theaters in the United States and Canada, ranking No. 1 at the box office in its opening weekend and averaging $7,705 per theater. It grossed $43,869,350 in the U.S. and a $12,728,210 in other territories for a worldwide total of $56,597,560.

== Reception ==
On the review aggregator website Rotten Tomatoes, 9% of 68 critics' reviews are positive. The website's consensus reads: "A dim and predictable remake of an already dull slasher film, this Prom Night fails to be memorable." Metacritic, which uses a weighted average, assigned the film a score of 17 out of 100, based on 12 critics, indicating "overwhelming dislike". Audiences polled by CinemaScore gave the film an average grade of "B−" on an A+ to F scale.

Mark Olsen of the Los Angeles Times wrote: "This is as listless, mindless and utterly useless a piece of corporate brain-clog as one is likely to come across for quite some time."

=== Home media ===
The DVD and Blu-ray Disc was released on August 19, 2008, in theatrical (88 minutes) and unrated (89 minutes) versions. Both formats contain deleted scenes and an alternate ending. It was released in Australia on Blu-ray and 2 Disc DVD Edition on August 27, 2008. In F.Y.E. stores in the U.S., the unrated edition came with a bonus disc called "Body Count: Investigating the Murders of Prom Night," a 22-minute documentary about the murders of various characters in the film, as well as various techniques the director used to make the murders scarier. The home media release also includes interviews with Nelson McCormick (director) and other members of the cast of the film.
