= The Get Together =

- Poster
- Directed by: Will Bakke
- Written by: Will Bakke; Michael B. Allen
- Starring: Alejandro Rose-Garcia; Johanna Braddy; Jacob Artist; Courtney Parchman
- Distributed by: Vertical Entertainment
- Release date: October 2020 (Austin)
- Running time: 74 minutes
- Country: United States
- Language: English

The Get Together is a 2020 American comedy film directed by Will Bakke and starring Alejandro Rose-Garcia, Johanna Braddy, Jacob Artist and Courtney Parchman.

== Cast ==
- Alejandro Rose-Garcia as Caleb
- Johanna Braddy as Betsy
- Jacob Artist as Damien
- Courtney Parchman as August
- Stephanie Hunt as Nora
- Bill Wise as Rick
- Luxy Banner as McCall

== Release ==
The film premiered in October 2020 at the Austin Film Festival.

== Reception ==
The film has a 90% rating on Rotten Tomatoes based on ten reviews.

Selome Hailu of The Austin Chronicle awarded the film three and a half stars out of five and wrote, "The college archetypes get a bit on-the-nose, and some lingering underwater scenes feel jammed in to match other coming-of-agers. But ultimately, the imperfections just feel cute."

Tara McNamara of Common Sense Media awarded the film two stars out of five.

Cat Cardenas of Texas Monthly gave the film a negative review and wrote, "Though the premise of each film is a party, The Get Together fails to deliver on heart."
