= Johanna Braddy =

American actress

- Born: Atlanta, Georgia, U.S.
- Occupation: Actress
- Years active: 2004–present
- Spouse: Josh Blaylock (m. 2012, divorced) Freddie Stroma (m. 2016)

Johanna Braddy is an American actress. She played the leading role in the 2009 horror film The Grudge 3, and has appeared in Pop Rocks (2004), Hurt (2009), Easy A (2010), Paranormal Activity 3 (2011), The Levenger Tapes (2011), and Superman (2025). She starred as Jenny Matrix in the web series Video Game High School from 2012 to 2014. In 2015, Braddy co-starred as Anna Martin in the Lifetime dark comedy-drama series Unreal. She also starred as Shelby Wyatt in the ABC thriller series Quantico.

== Early life ==
Braddy was born in Atlanta, Georgia; the daughter of Jo Beth, a preschool music teacher and a vocalist, and Steve Braddy, an engineer. Braddy has one brother, Cole Braddy. Braddy attended McIntosh High School in Peachtree City, Georgia, and graduated in 2005.

== Career ==
Braddy made her screen acting début in the ABC Family television film Pop Rocks playing Olivia Harden. She made her voice acting debut in Avatar: The Last Airbender playing the role of Princess Yue. Braddy also played small parts in films Broken Bridges, Home of the Giants and Whore. On television, she had recurring roles in the FX drama The Riches, ABC Family teen comedy-drama, Greek, and VH1 soap Hit the Floor. She also guest starred on Cold Case, Southland, CSI: Crime Scene Investigation, Suburgatory, and Shameless.

In 2009, Braddy had her first leading role in the horror film The Grudge 3, a third installment in The Grudge franchise, released direct-to-video. The following year, she played a supporting role in the teen comedy Easy A starring Emma Stone. She had roles in horror films Hurt, The Levenger Tapes, Paranormal Activity 3, and The Collection. From 2012 to 2014, she co-starred in the web series Video Game High School.

In 2013, Braddy was cast opposite Constance Zimmer and Shiri Appleby in the Lifetime dark comedy-drama, Unreal. The series premiered on June 1, 2015 with positive reviews from critics. Also in 2015, Braddy was cast as a series regular in the ABC thriller Quantico along with Priyanka Chopra, Yasmine Al Massri, Graham Rogers, Jake McLaughlin and Aunjanue Ellis.

== Personal life ==
Braddy began dating her Video Game High School co-star Josh Blaylock after shooting the first season, having first met during the auditions. They got engaged on May 1, 2012 and married on November 11, 2012. After two years of marriage, they divorced sometime between late 2014 and early 2015.

Braddy began dating her Unreal co-star, Freddie Stroma, in the summer of 2015. Braddy and Stroma became engaged in May 2016 and married on December 30, 2016, in Atlanta, Georgia.

== Filmography ==
=== Film ===
Year	Title	Role	Notes
2006	Broken Bridges	Kayla Chartwell	
2007	Surf's Up	Additional voices	Voice role
2007	Home of the Giants	Freshman	
2007	Penny Dreadful	Willa Fowler	Short film
2008	Whore	Margot	
2009	The Grudge 3	Lisa	Direct-to-video
2009	Fame	Katie	Uncredited
2009	Wild About Harry	Lucy Carmichael	
2009	Ponyo	Additional voices	English dub
2009	Hurt	Lenore Coltrane	
2010	Easy A	Melody Bostic	
2011	The Levenger Tapes	Amanda	
2011	Paranormal Activity 3	Lisa	
2011	Born to Race	Rachel	
2012	The Collection	Missy Solomon	
2014	Believe Me	Callie	
2016	Cardboard Boxer	Clean Cut Girl	
2016	Run the Tide	Michelle Turner	
2018	Miss Arizona	Rose	
2020	The Get Together	Betsy	
2021	Saving Paradise	Charlie Clark	
2025	Superman	Metropolis Citizen #1	

=== Television ===
Year	Title	Role	Notes
2004	Pop Rocks	Olivia Harden	Television film
2005	Surface	Lisa	Episode: "Pilot"
2005–2007	Avatar: The Last Airbender	Princess Yue, additional voices (voice)	Voice role, 5 episodes
2007	Cold Case	Hilary West (1964)	Episode: "The Good-Bye Room"
2007	The Riches	Tammy Simms	Recurring role, 6 episodes
2007	Drake & Josh	Emily	Episode: "Dance Contest"
2007	Samantha Who?	Teenage Samantha	Episode: "The Restraining Order"
2008	The Oaks	Young Jessica	Unsold Fox pilot
2008	Danny Fricke	Jennifer Stockwell	Unsold A&E pilot
2009	Lie to Me	Jacquelin Mathis	Episode: "Pilot"
2009	Greek	Jordan Reed	Recurring role, 15 episodes
2009	A Marriage	Sophie	Unsold CBS pilot
2009–2010	Southland	Olivia Sherman	2 episodes
2010	Detroit 1-8-7	Elizabeth Fadden	Episode: "Lost Child/Murder 101"
2010	CSI: Miami	Lucy Strickland	Episode: "Wheels Up"
2011	Leverage	Hayley Beck	Episode: "The 10 Li'l Grifters Job"
2011	Friends with Benefits	Grace	Episode: "The Benefit of Mardi Gras"
2011	Criminal Minds	Tammy Bradstone	Episode: "Proof"
2012	CSI: Crime Scene Investigation	Carly Green	Episode: "Play Dead"
2012–2014	Video Game High School	Jenny Matrix	Web series; main role
2013	Suburgatory	Leslie	Episode: "Go, Gamblers!"
2013	Necessary Roughness	Cindy Luck	Episode: "Gimme Some Lovin'"
2013	Hit the Floor	Mia Sertner	Recurring role, 4 episodes
2013	Perception	Ashley Damlison	Episode: "Asylum"
2014	Shameless	Shelley	Episode: "My Oldest Daughter"
2015	Unreal	Anna Martin	Main role, 10 episodes
2015–2018	Quantico	Shelby Wyatt	Main role, 57 episodes
2019	Soundtrack	Crying Judge	Episode: "Track 2: Joanna and Nellie"
2021–2022	Chicago Med	Avery Quinn	Recurring role
2023	Gossip Girl	Jessica Bradley	2 episodes
2023	A Million Little Things	Claire Fisher	3 episodes
2024	Law & Order: Special Victims Unit	Maggie Andrews	Episode: "Excavation"
2024	Mo	Austin	2 episodes
