= Asher Monroe =

American dancer and actor

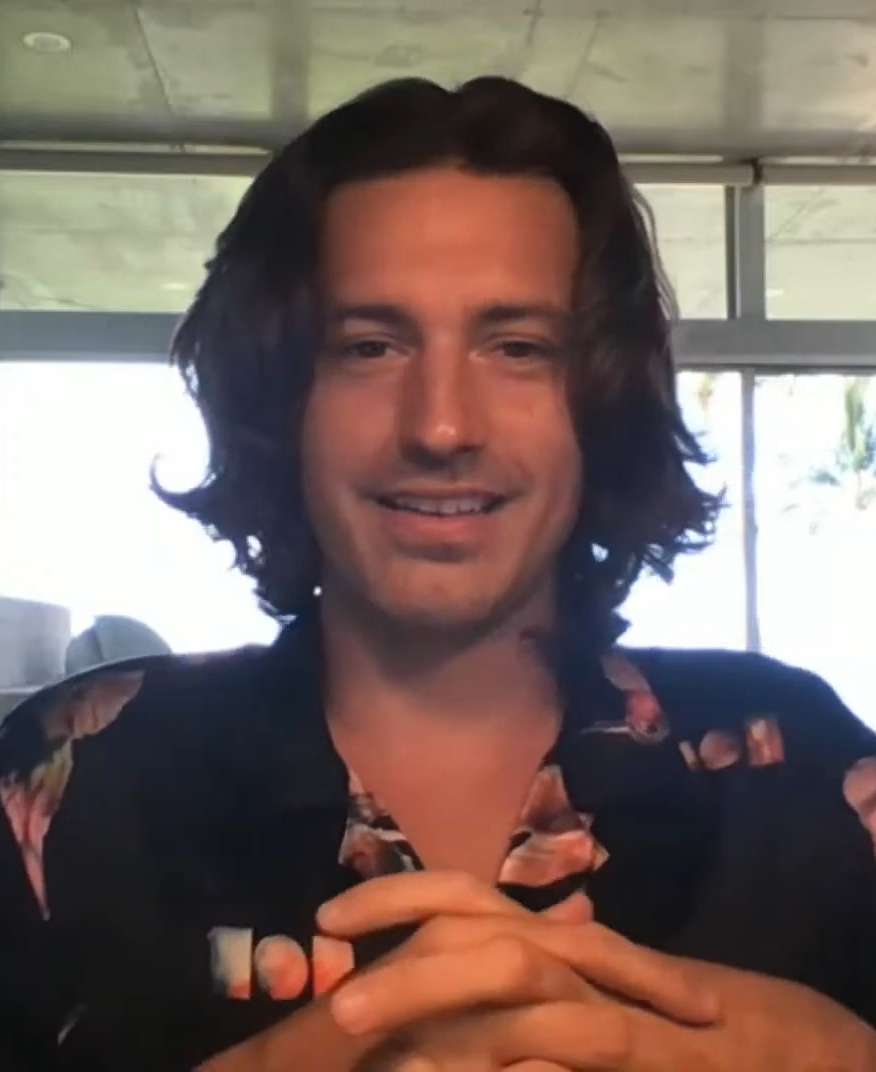
- Monroe in 2022

Background information
- Born: Asher Monroe Book; September 18, 1988 (age 38); Arlington, Virginia, U.S.
- Genres: Pop, R&B, soul, reggae
- Occupations: Recording artist, actor, dancer
- Instrument: piano
- Years active: 1995–present
- Labels: D Empire Entertainment, Warner Bros. Records
- Website: www.ashermonroe.com

Asher Monroe Book (born September 18, 1988), known professionally as Asher Monroe, is an American singer-songwriter, dancer, and actor. In 2006, after starring in an extensive run of national tours including The Sound of Music, Oliver!, and The Prince and the Pauper, Monroe signed to Warner Bros. Records, under which he released his first top 40 single "Love Struck" as lead singer for the boy band V Factory. From 2006 to 2009, he starred in multiple prime time TV & film roles including Parenthood on NBC the MGM remake of Fame and The Mentalist on CBS, after which he signed on as the flagship solo artist to the music label D Empire Entertainment. In 2011, under new label and management, he was named one of MTV's Top Ten Artists, alongside other artists such as Frank Ocean, Lana Del Rey, and Avicii. In December 2012, he appeared on the sponsored cover of Billboard magazine, after he which he released his two latest singles: Here With You (co-written by Monroe and produced by OneRepublic frontman Ryan Tedder) and Hush Hush (co-produced by Monroe). Monroe began recording collaborations in late 2013 with Chris Brown and Sean Kingston in Los Angeles, CA for a solo album.

== Early life ==
At the age of seven, he landed the role of “Chip” in the first national tour of the Broadway Production of Beauty and The Beast.

At the age of 16, he made his film debut in the role of Liam in the ABC Family TV movie Pop Rocks. He played the son of an 80s rockstar, who is unknowingly following in his father’s footsteps.

== Career ==
=== V Factory ===
Monroe became lead singer of V Factory shortly after high school. On April 29, 2008, their These Are The Days EP was released on iTunes, including "Round and Round", "She Bad" (featuring E-40), and the namesake, "These Are the Days" produced by Bryan Todd. In May 2008, V Factory performed on Johnny Wright's Bandemonium Tour alongside Menudo and NLT. V Factory's first single, "Love Struck", was released to iTunes on February 3, 2009. The single broke top 40 on mainstream radio peaking at No. 37 and No. 70 on the Pop 100.[4] The song was produced by Swedish production team Twin. V Factory shared the stage with other notable artists such as Kelly Clarkson, Pitbull, M.C. Hammer, and Flo Rida before ultimately disbanding in 2009.

=== Solo Recording career ===
In 2011, under the shortened name 'Asher Monroe', he began co-writing and producing new songs with various Los Angeles based talent. When Monroe's first solo music video for "Like I Do" was released on YouTube, it garnered up more than 1.6 million views, half of them within the first 24 hours. His second music video "Hello Baby" was featured on the Huffington Post and Forbes. "Every Night" (released in late February 2012) garnered over 2.5 million views just prior to a 20 city co-headlining national tour. After the tour, Monroe founded independent music label D Empire Entertainment with global activist and entrepreneur Diana Jenkins. In August 2012, Monroe collaborated with frontman for OneRepublic, Ryan Tedder on "Here With You". The song was added to full rotation on nationally broadcast radio station SiriusXM, and entered the top ten on Billboard charts. In Feb 2013, Monroe released a remix EP for "Here With You" featuring remixes by Grammy nominated DJ, Dave Aude and Sick Individuals. Monroe co-wrote and produced his next July 2013 release "Hush Hush" alongside Alon Levitan in Hollywood Hills, CA. Monroe filmed the music video for "Hush Hush" in Bosnia Herzegovina with Academy Award winner Danis Tanovic. "Hush Hush" became a top 10 Billboard song and was featured on MTV and Perez Hilton. "Hush Hush" was Monroe's first D Empire Entertainment release with new distribution partner Ingrooves/Fontana.

In December 2012, D Empire Entertainment secured a joint venture/album collaboration between Monroe, Chris Brown and Senior VP of A&R for Def Jam, Bu Thiam.

In late 2013, Monroe wrote and recorded new material with Chris Brown and recording artist Sean Kingston at the Record Plant in Los Angeles, CA.

In December 2013, Monroe released his "Christmas Is Here To Stay" EP on iTunes, featuring the title track as well as the ballad "Warm Winter Night". Both songs included music videos directed by Giuliano Bekor.

In February 2014, Monroe released the music video "Memory" featuring Chris Brown (co-written by Monroe, Justin Tarin, and Chris Brown)

== Discography ==
=== Albums ===
- Inner Warrior (2017)
- Talk with God (2021)
- Windows of Time (2022)

=== Extended Plays ===
- On My Way Pt. I (2014)
- On My Way Pt. II (2015)
- Elev8ted (2019)

=== Singles ===
Year	Title
2011	"Back For More" (feat. Hot For Words): Released: May 10, 2011; Label: D Empire Entertainment; Formats: CD, digital download
2011	"Love Away": Released: May 11, 2011; Label: D Empire Entertainment; Formats: CD, digital download
2011	"So High": Released: May 11, 2011; Label: D Empire Entertainment; Formats: CD, digital download
2011	"Like I Do": Released: November 3, 2011; Label: D Empire Entertainment; Formats: CD, digital download
2012	"Hello Baby": Released: January 13, 2012; Label: D Empire Entertainment; Formats: CD, digital download
2012	"Every Night": Released: February 25, 2012; Label: D Empire Entertainment; Formats: CD, digital download
2012	"Here With You": Released: August 29, 2012; Label: D Empire Entertainment; Formats: CD, digital download
2013	"Hush Hush": Released: July 9, 2013; Label: D Empire Entertainment; Formats: CD, digital download
2014	"Memory" (featuring Chris Brown): Released: March 4, 2014; Label: D Empire Entertainment; Formats: Dance radio

== Theater ==
Year	Production	Role	Dates
1995	Beauty and the Beast (musical)	Chip	November 7, 1995 – March 7, 1999

== Filmography ==
=== Movies ===
Year	Title	Role	Producer
2004	Pop Rocks	Liam	Patricia Clifford
2005	Come Away Home	Chris	Doug McKeon
2009	Fame	Marco Ramone	Kevin Tancharoen

=== Television ===
Year	Title	Role	Season(s)	Episode(s)
2003	Dora the Explorer	Cloud Prince & Saltador star	4	1
2005	Zoey 101	Glen Davis	1	12
2006	Close to Home	Alex Towers	1	11
2007	Eight One Eight	Chris		
2007	Medium	Wyatt Forrester	3	7
2009	Xpose	Himself		
2009	The Wendy Williams Show	Himself		
2009	Entertainment Tonight	Himself		
2010	Parenthood	Steve Williams	1	04,05,07,09,10,11,12,13
2010	The Mentalist	Jackson Winter	3	4
2022	The Real Housewives of Beverly Hills	Himself	12	Appearing as Diana Jenkins' fiancé (guest)
