= Taylor Lautner =

American actor (born 1992)

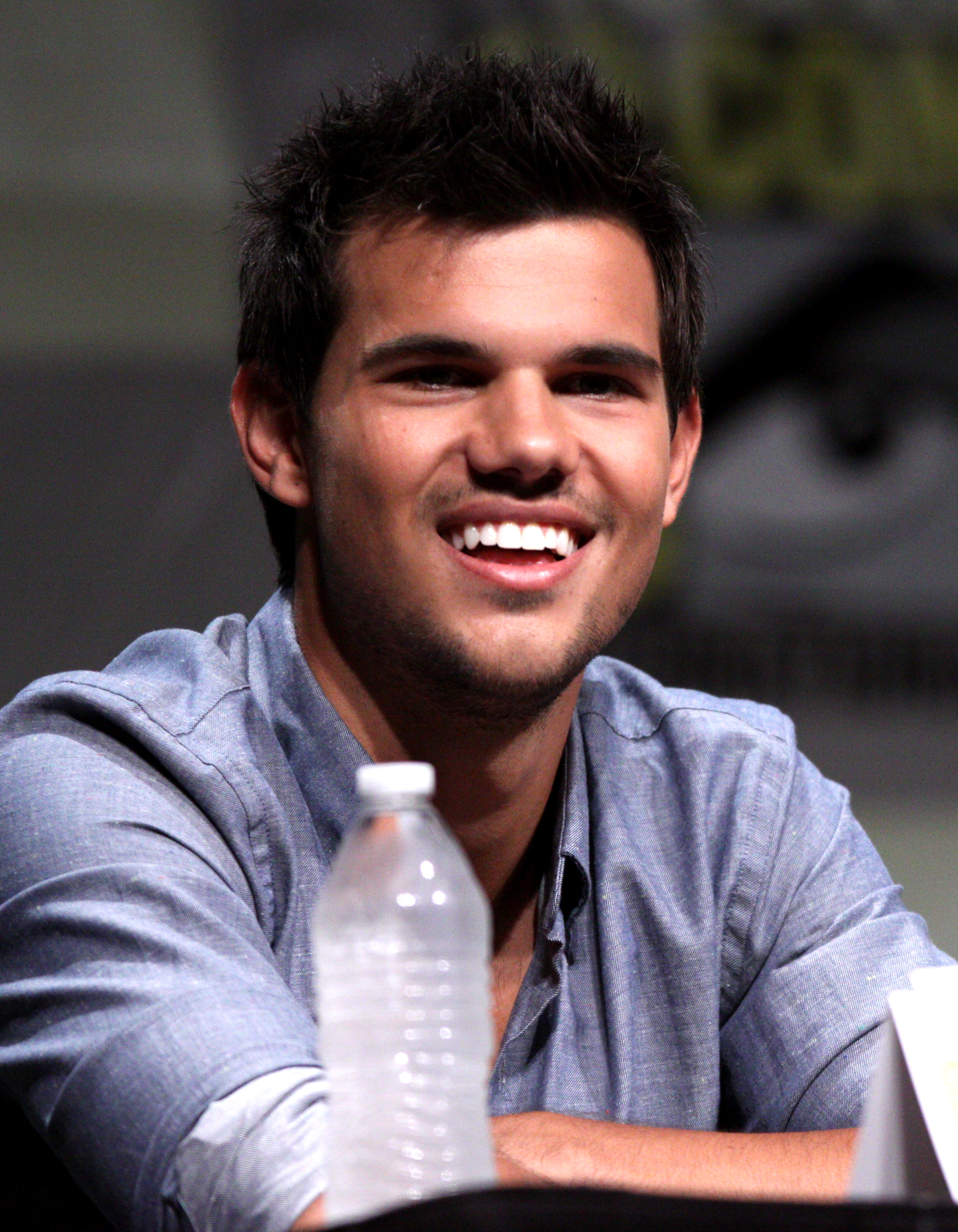
- Lautner at the 2012 San Diego Comic-Con
- Born: Taylor Daniel Lautner; February 11, 1992 (age 34); Grand Rapids, Michigan, U.S.
- Occupations: Actor; martial artist; producer
- Years active: 2001–present
- Spouse: Taylor Dome (m. 2022)
- Children: 1

Taylor Daniel Lautner (/ˈlaʊtnər/ LOWT-nər; born February 11, 1992) is an American actor, martial artist, and producer. He is best known for playing the werewolf Jacob Black in The Twilight Saga film series (2008–2012). His accolades include a Scream Award, seven Teen Choice Awards, two People's Choice Awards, and an MTV Movie Award.

Born in Grand Rapids, Michigan, Lautner began practising martial arts at the age of six. He became a black belt at the age of 10, and by the age of 14, he was a four-time world champion. He began his acting career playing bit parts in comedy series such as The Bernie Mac Show (2003) and My Wife and Kids (2004), before having voice roles in television series like What's New, Scooby-Doo? (2005) and Danny Phantom (2005). In 2005, he got his big break when he landed the role of Sharkboy in the film The Adventures of Sharkboy and Lavagirl. Also that year, he starred in Cheaper by the Dozen 2.

The late 2000s saw Lautner become a teen idol and sex symbol, after extensively changing his physique to keep the role of Jacob Black in further Twilight installments and generating media attention for his looks. In 2010, he was ranked second on Glamour's "The 50 Sexiest Men of 2010" list, and fourth on People's "Most Amazing Bodies" list. Also in the same year, Lautner was named the highest-paid teenage actor in Hollywood.

In 2011, Lautner starred in the action film Abduction, in which he did almost all of his stunts. In 2013, he appeared in the comedy film Grown Ups 2. From 2014 to 2018, Lautner starred in the BBC sitcom Cuckoo as the son of the titular character. In 2015, he starred in the action film Tracers and the comedy film The Ridiculous 6. The following year, he portrayed Dr. Cassidy Cascade in the second season of Fox black comedy series Scream Queens.

== Early life ==
Taylor Daniel Lautner was born on February 11, 1992, in Grand Rapids, Michigan, the son of Deborah (née Bos) and Daniel Lautner. His mother works for a software development company, while his father was a Midwest Airlines pilot. He has one younger sister named Makena. Raised as a Roman Catholic, Lautner has Dutch, French, and German ancestry. He has claimed that he has "distant" Native American ancestry (specifically Ottawa Indian and Potawatomi) through his mother. This claim is challenged by scholars. He grew up in Hudsonville, Michigan, a town near Grand Rapids. He has stated that he was bullied in school because he was an actor. He commented, "I just had to tell myself 'I can't let this get to me. This is what I love to do. And I'm going to continue doing it.'"

Lautner took his first karate class at the age of six. A year later, he attended the national karate tournament in Louisville, Kentucky, where he met Michael Chaturantabut, the founder of Xtreme Martial Arts. Chaturantabut invited Lautner to a camp he held at University of California, Los Angeles. Lautner trained with Chaturantabut for several years, earning his black belt by the age of eight, and winning several junior world championships. He appeared in an ISKA karate event, the US Open ISKA World Martial Arts Championships, televised on ESPN in 2003 that was later lampooned on the sports-comedy show Cheap Seats that first aired in 2006.

In junior high, Lautner—who was involved in karate, baseball and hip-hop dance—won the award for "Best Smile" and played in the school's Turkey Bowl American Football game. He went to public school at Valencia High School in Santa Clarita, California until his sophomore year. Chaturantabut, who once portrayed the Blue Ranger in Power Rangers Lightspeed Rescue, suggested to Lautner that he take up acting. For a few years, the Lautners flew from Michigan to Los Angeles for auditions when his talent agency called, and returned to Grand Rapids for school sometimes the same day. Lautner balanced karate and acting with being on the football and baseball teams at his school, and taking up jazz and hip-hop dance. After that became tiring, Lautner and his family decided to move to California for a month to try it out, before moving to Santa Clarita in 2002.

== Career ==
=== 2001–2007: Career beginnings ===
In his first months after moving to Los Angeles, Lautner appeared in small film and television roles, as well as advertisements and commercials. In 2001, Lautner first appeared in the made-for-television film, Shadow Fury. He then got a voice-over job in a commercial for Rugrats Go Wild and also appeared in many small roles on television shows, including The Bernie Mac Show, My Wife and Kids, and Summerland. Lautner then earned voice-over roles in animated series such as Danny Phantom, Duck Dodgers, and What's New, Scooby-Doo?.

In 2005, Lautner earned his first breakout role, starring in the film, The Adventures of Sharkboy and Lavagirl. Lautner spent three months on location in Austin, Texas, to film the movie, which was received with negative reviews from critics and was a minor international success. However, Lautner was nominated at the 27th Young Artist Awards for Best Performance in a Feature Film by a Leading Actor. For the film, Lautner choreographed all of his fight scenes after director Robert Rodríguez learned of his extensive martial arts training. Months later, he played Eliot Murtaugh in Cheaper by the Dozen 2, which was panned by critics, being named one of the "Worst Films of the 2000s" by Rotten Tomatoes.

After returning from Canada filming the latter movie, Lautner said he realized his newfound fame, from Sharkboy and Lavagirl. In 2006, he appeared in the show Love, Inc. and the TV special He's a Bully, Charlie Brown. Two years later, Lautner appeared in a lead role in the short-lived NBC drama My Own Worst Enemy, portraying Christian Slater's son, Jack Spivey. Rolling Stone coined his early roles as either "the popular kid, jock, or bully."

=== 2008–2009: Breakthrough and The Twilight Series ===
In 2007, filmmakers began a search for actors to portray Jacob Black, a Native American friend of lead character Bella Swan in Twilight, the first film in The Twilight Saga film series. In January 2008, an open casting call was held in Portland, Oregon. Lautner had not heard of the Twilight series before, but was urged by his agent to audition. At his audition, he read lines with Kristen Stewart, who had already been cast as Bella, and they acted out scenes from The Twilight Saga: New Moon and The Twilight Saga: Eclipse. The film was a commercial success, earning $69 million its opening weekend, and has grossed $392 million worldwide. It received mixed reviews from critics, having a "Rotten" rating with a weighted average of 5.5/10. In describing the critical consensus, it stated: "Having lost much of its bite transitioning to the big screen, Twilight will please its devoted fans, but do little for the uninitiated." On Metacritic, which assigns a weighted mean rating out of 100 reviews from film critics, it has an average score of 56 from the 37 reviews. At the 2009 MTV Movie Awards, Lautner was nominated for Male Breakthrough Performance, which was won by co-star Robert Pattinson.

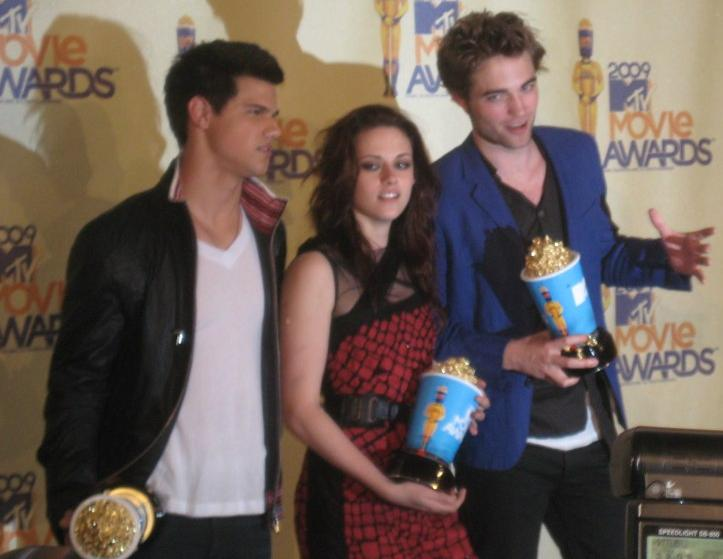
Lautner with Twilight costars Kristen Stewart and Robert Pattinson at the 2009 MTV Movie Awards

Initially, director Chris Weitz wanted to recast the role of Jacob Black for Twilight's sequel, The Twilight Saga: New Moon, due to the major physical changes that occur in Black between the two novels, and have an actor that would accurately portray "the new, larger Jacob Black." Black's role in the novel also increases significantly, with him falling in love with Bella and becoming a shapeshifter, putting the actor in a starring role. Representatives for Weitz had stated that they would make a full effort to recast the "high-profile gig", and MTV News confirmed that Weitz was looking at Michael Copon to take on the role; however, Summit Entertainment said a decision had not been made. In an attempt to keep the role, Lautner weight-trained extensively and gained approximately 30 pounds of muscle. In January 2009, Weitz and Summit Entertainment announced that Lautner would continue to play the role of Jacob in the sequel. In an interview, fellow cast member Stewart talked about Lautner's transformation saying, "He's an entirely different person physically." Stewart later said, "He gets a lot of attention because he's buff, but I think as soon as the movie comes out, people are going to realize that's not why he got the job." Co-star Pattinson said after seeing Lautner's body, "I saw him and thought 'Jesus, I'm going to get fired.'" In an interview with The Wrap, Weitz said Lautner deserved a lot of credit for the movie's box office, stating, "If you look at the movie, it should have been the weakest in the franchise, because Robert Pattinson doesn't play as big a role." Weitz said Lautner had to "pick up that slack, and if his character hadn't been emotionally, not just physically, appealing, the movie wouldn't have been as big a hit." The commercial performance of the film outpaced the first film, setting several box office records including the biggest midnight opening in North America and the biggest single-day opening. The opening weekend of New Moon is the third highest opening weekend in domestic history with $142,839,137. New Moon also has the sixth highest worldwide opening weekend with $274.9 million total. Critical reception was less favorable, with the movie getting a 4.6/10 average from Rotten Tomatoes, and a 44 on Metacritic. Lautner won Favorite Breakout Movie Actor at the 35th People's Choice Awards.

Although it began after the release of the first film, upon release of New Moon, Lautner and his co-stars Stewart and Pattinson transitioned to teen idol status, with Lautner particularly admired by teens for his new physical characteristics, becoming a sex symbol. The trio appeared on many covers and televised appearances together. In between the second and third films in the Twilight series, Lautner was a part of the ensemble cast in the movie Valentine's Day as Willy Harrington, acting alongside his rumored girlfriend at the time, American singer-songwriter Taylor Swift. The duo was nominated at the 2010 MTV Movie Awards for Best Kiss. Although it received generally negative reviews, the film grossed $213 million and had the second biggest opening in the United States for a romantic comedy film. Lautner presented at the 2009 MTV Video Music Awards and the 82nd Academy Awards. Lautner hosted Saturday Night Live on December 12, 2009, making him one of the youngest celebrity hosts in the show's history.

=== 2010–present: Continuing Twilight, later projects, and hiatus ===
Lautner returned for the third Twilight film, The Twilight Saga: Eclipse, in 2010. Despite receiving mixed reviews from critics, the film surpassed its predecessor to become the highest-grossing film of the franchise and the highest-grossing romantic fantasy, shapeshifter and vampire movie of all time at the North American box office. It ranked as the 36th highest-grossing film of all-time in the U.S. and Canada. The popularity of Lautner and his cast members continued to summit, especially via the "Team Edward vs. Team Jacob" campaign that promoted the film. Lautner's fanbase also began to expand to older audiences. Lautner won Best Fantasy Actor at the 2010 Scream Awards, and he is nominated for Favorite Movie Actor for his role in Eclipse at the 37th People's Choice Awards. By the end of the year, Lautner was considered to be the highest-paid teen actor in Hollywood. In November 2010, The Hollywood Reporter named Lautner as one of the young male actors who are "pushing – or being pushed" into taking over Hollywood as the new "A-List".

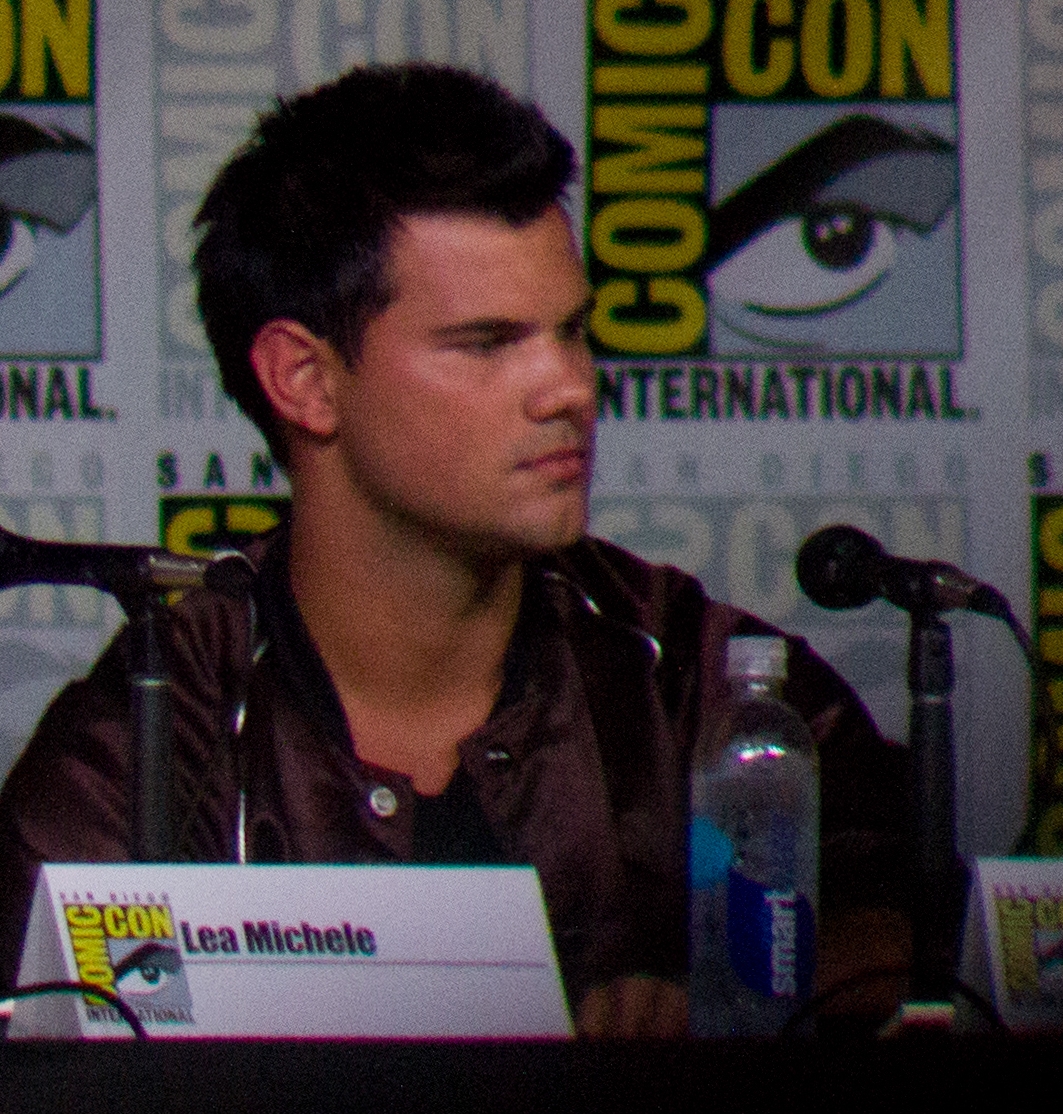
Lautner at the 2016 San Diego Comic-Con

Lautner was initially supposed to be in two films, Northern Lights and a movie based on Max Steel, but pulled out of both films due to scheduling conflicts and better offers. Other planned projects were the lead in a movie about Stretch Armstrong and a hostage thriller, Cancun. Lautner filmed a Bourne Identity-esque spy film with Lily Collins, entitled Abduction. It was released in September 2011 to universally negative reviews from critics and Lautner's performance was mostly criticised. For Abduction, Lautner won a Teen Choice Award for Choice Action Actor in 2012. He appeared in the remaining parts of the Twilight series, The Twilight Saga: Breaking Dawn films, which were released over a two-year period from 2011–2012. Lautner then filmed Grown Ups 2 alongside Adam Sandler and Chris Rock. It was released in September 2013.

In February 2014, it was confirmed that Lautner would be joining the BBC Three comedy series Cuckoo, replacing Andy Samberg. Lautner has continued in this role, co-starring for three series. From September to December 2016, Lautner co-starred on the Ryan Murphy comedy horror series Scream Queens.

On July 7, 2023, Lautner appeared onstage after singer Swift premiered a new music video for the song "I Can See You" at The Eras Tour in Kansas City. The video stars Lautner, Joey King, and Presley Cash. Lautner inspired her Speak Now album's single "Back to December".

== Public image ==
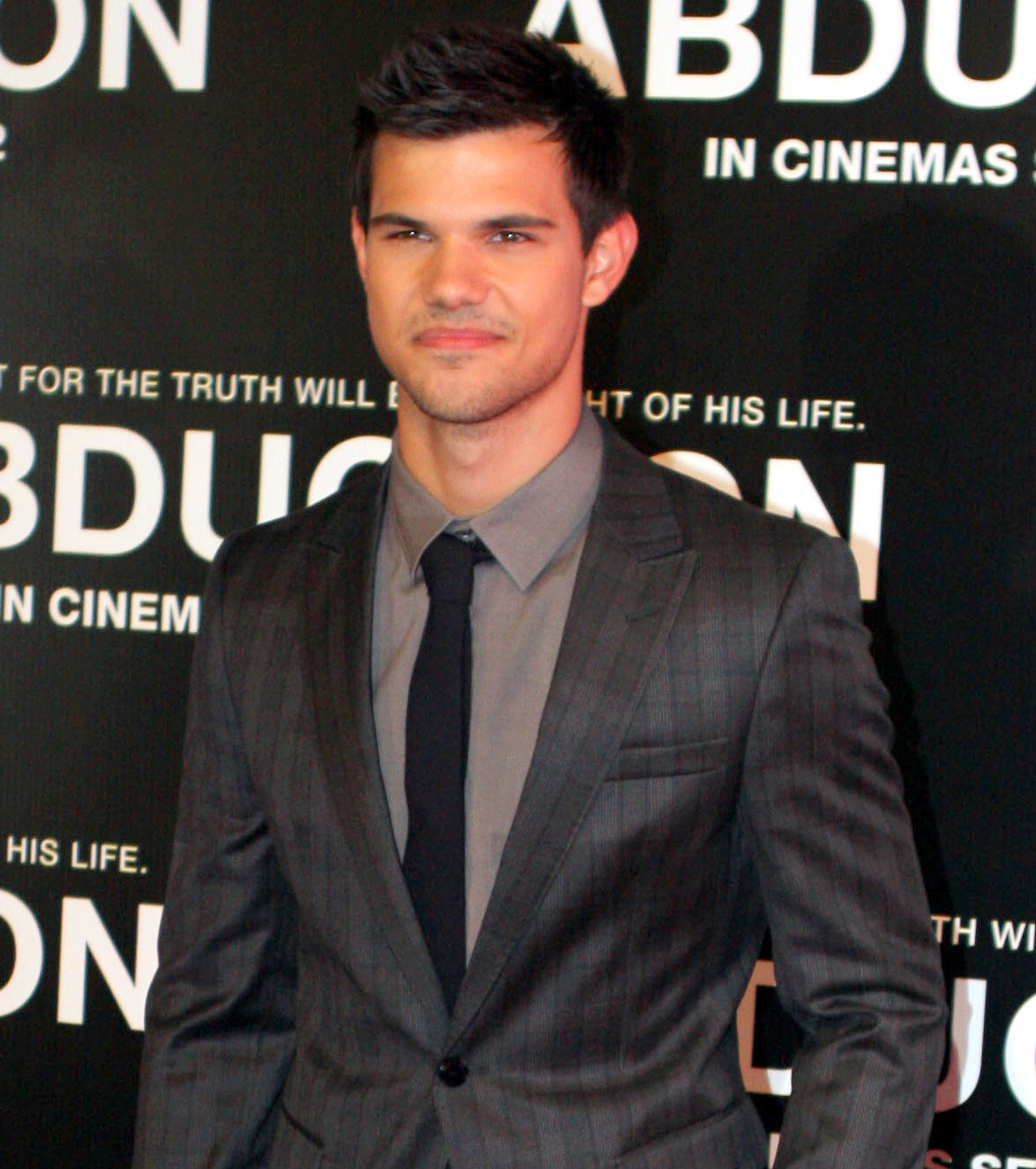
Lautner at the Abduction premiere, 2011

Publications such as GQ, Rolling Stone, and People have referred Lautner as a sex symbol, with the latter publication calling the actor a future epitome of pop culture. He has been called the new young adult star that can "both woo the girls with his intensity and impress the boys with his rugged agility." According to Mickey Rapkin of GQ, the use of Lautner's physique in films has been compared to Megan Fox in her work. After his massive physical change following Twilight, Lautner became a tabloid teen idol with his co-stars Robert Pattinson and Kristen Stewart. Lautner, determined to stay in the series, worked out every day and gained over 30 pounds (14 kg) of muscle in order to bulk up for the role of Jacob Black in the remaining films in The Twilight Saga. Michelle Lanz of MSN Wonderwall said that Lautner's change may have saved his career. Several critics credit Lautner's physical characteristics for much of the success of the Twilight series, with critic Sharon Waxman stating, "as a tabloid teen idol, he certainly deserves some credit for New Moon's $700 million worldwide gross." Lautner's abs in particular have been subject to media attention, with The Wrap stating that companies bidding for the actor in movies in 2011 would "shell out for the young actor's much-on-display though mostly untried abs." Rapkin of GQ said, "the film's marketing issues were solved when Lautner's "abdominal muscles became New Moon's main talking point, not to mention his calling card." He was named number one on Access Hollywood's "Top 5 Hollywood Abs" list.

Before the actor turned 18, his sexualized image was often critiqued, and subject to controversy. In December 2009, Lautner appeared on the cover of Rolling Stone in a wet T-shirt. Jennifer Cady of E! Online said to wait a few months when Lautner would "be of age, which will make this whole operation you got going on completely legal." In his interview with the magazine, after declining to talk about whether he was dating Taylor Swift, the magazine pressed Lautner on rumors of him being gay, which he brushed off. Brent Hartinger, a columnist for AfterElton, blasted the magazine, calling the questioning "unimaginably irresponsible", commenting that Lautner was just "a 17-year old kid" and that while the rumors were baseless and speculation from certain blogs and fans, it was disappointing that a "legitimate media outlet" would print gossip. Hartinger said the magazine reached a "new low" and did not have common decency, noting that the line between child and adult "is there for a good reason".

Lautner has stated that he does not want to be just known for his looks, as some have attributed his popularity to that and not his actual acting skill. In an interview, the actor revealed that he was originally supposed to have a baring scene in the movie Valentine's Day. He stated, "The script said we were walking into school and Willy takes off his shirt. I said, 'Whoa, whoa, whoa. Time out. He's gonna take off his shirt in the middle of school? No, no, no. The reason I took off my shirt for New Moon is because it's written in the book that way. And there's reasons behind it." Lautner later said he would not bare his chest for any role that did not call for it. In June 2010, Lautner covered GQ magazine. The actor was lampooned in conservative writer Laura Ingraham's satirical The Obama Diaries, commenting to have Lautner as a mascot for the White House Easter Egg Roll, to fit their health-conscious theme, and have Lautner don a furry bunny head and appear shirtless. In 2010, Lautner was ranked number two on Glamour's "50 Sexiest Men of 2010 " list. Men's Health ranked him at third on their list of "Top 10 Summer Bodies". Additionally in 2010, he was ranked fourth on People's "Most Amazing Bodies" list.

== Personal life ==
Lautner has an intensive workout regimen, which was profiled by Men's Health, and follows a specific diet developed while preparing for his role in The Twilight Saga: New Moon. As of the early 2010s, he continued to train in martial arts regularly. Around the same time, Lautner stated that he does not use drugs or alcohol.

Lautner is a fan of the Detroit Lions.

While filming Valentine's Day in October 2009, Lautner began a romantic relationship with his co-star Taylor Swift; they ended the relationship later that year. After working with Lily Collins on Abduction, he began dating her in November 2010, and they separated in September 2011. From 2013 to 2015, he was in a relationship with Canadian actress and Tracers co-star Marie Avgeropoulos. Lautner began dating actress and Scream Queens co-star Billie Lourd in December 2016; they separated in July 2017.

Lautner announced in 2018 that he was in a relationship with Taylor Dome, a nurse. The couple married on November 11, 2022, at Epoch Estate Wines in California. Before their wedding, Lautner stated that Dome planned to take his surname, resulting in both partners being named Taylor Lautner. She often goes by the nickname "Tay", which helps distinguish between them. In September 2026, their first child, a daughter, was born.

== Filmography ==
=== Film ===
Year	Title	Role	Notes
2005	The Adventures of Sharkboy and Lavagirl	Sharkboy	
2005	Cheaper by the Dozen 2	Elliot Murtaugh	
2008	Twilight	Jacob Black	
2009	The Twilight Saga: New Moon	Jacob Black	
2010	Valentine's Day	Willy Harrington	
2010	The Twilight Saga: Eclipse	Jacob Black	
2011	Field of Dreams 2: Lockout	Iowa Farmer	Short film
2011	Abduction	Nathan Harper	
2011	The Twilight Saga: Breaking Dawn – Part 1	Jacob Black	
2012	The Twilight Saga: Breaking Dawn – Part 2	Jacob Black	
2013	Grown Ups 2	Frat Boy Andy	Uncredited
2015	Tracers	Cam	
2015	The Ridiculous 6	Lil' Pete	
2016	Run the Tide	Reymond Hightower	
2022	Home Team	Troy Lambert	
TBA	The Token Groomsman †	Scott	Filming

Key
†	Denotes films that have not yet been released

=== Television ===
Year	Title	Role	Notes
2001	Shadow Fury	Young Kismet	Television film
2003–2004	The Bernie Mac Show	Aaron	Episodes: "Bernie Mac Rope-a-Dope" and "Being Bernie Mac"
2004	The Nick & Jessica Variety Hour	Mouseketeer	Unsold television pilot
2004	My Wife and Kids	Tyrone	Episode: "Class Reunion"
2004	Summerland	Boy on beach	Episode: "To Thine Self Be True"
2005	What's New, Scooby-Doo?	Ned / Dennis	Voice role; 2 episodes
2005	Duck Dodgers	Terrible Obnoxious Boy / Reggie Wasserstein	Voice role; 2 episodes
2005–2007	Danny Phantom	Youngblood	Voice role; 3 episodes
2006	Love, Inc.	Oliver	Episode: "Arrested Development"
2006	He's a Bully, Charlie Brown	Joe Agate	Voice role; television special
2008	My Own Worst Enemy	Jack Spivey	Main role
2014–2018	Cuckoo	Dale Ashbrick Jr	Main role (series 2–4)
2016	Scream Queens	Dr. Cassidy Cascade	Main role (season 2)
TBA	Werewolf Hunter †	TBA	

=== Music videos ===
Year	Song	Artist	Role
2023	"I Can See You"	Taylor Swift	Robber

== Awards and nominations ==
Year	Nominated work	Award	Category	Result	Refs
2005	The Adventures of Sharkboy and Lavagirl in 3-D	Young Artist Awards	Best Performance in a Feature Film – Young Lead Actor	Nominated	
2009	Twilight	Scream Awards	Male Breakout Performance	Won	
2009	Twilight	MTV Movie Awards	Best Breakthrough Performance – Male	Nominated	
2009	Himself	Teen Choice Awards	Choice Fresh Face – Male	Won	
2010	The Twilight Saga: New Moon	People's Choice Awards	Favorite Breakout Actor	Won	
2010	The Twilight Saga: New Moon	Nickelodeon Kids' Choice Awards	Favorite Movie Actor	Won	
2010	The Twilight Saga: New Moon	Nickelodeon Kids' Choice Awards	Cutest Couple Shared with Kristen Stewart	Won	
2010	The Twilight Saga: New Moon	Golden Raspberry Awards	Worst Screen Couple Shared with Kristen Stewart	Nominated	
2010	The Twilight Saga: New Moon	Young Artist Awards	Best Performance in a Feature Film – Young Lead Actor	Nominated	
2010	Valentine's Day	MTV Movie Awards	Best Kiss Shared with Taylor Swift	Nominated	
2010	Himself	Teen Choice Awards	Male Hottie	Won	
2010	Himself	Teen Choice Awards	Red Carpet Fashion Icon – Male	Won	
2010	Himself	Teen Choice Awards	Choice Smile	Won	
2010	The Twilight Saga: Eclipse	Teen Choice Awards	Choice Movie Actor: Fantasy	Won	
2010	Valentine's Day	Teen Choice Awards	Choice Movie: Liplock Shared with Taylor Swift	Nominated	
2010	Valentine's Day	Teen Choice Awards	Choice Movie: Chemistry Shared with Taylor Swift	Nominated	
2010	The Twilight Saga: Eclipse	Scream Awards	Best Fantasy Actor	Nominated	
2010	The Twilight Saga: Eclipse	Nickelodeon Australian Kids' Choice Awards	Fave Kiss Shared with Kristen Stewart	Nominated	
2010	Himself	Nickelodeon Australian Kids' Choice Awards	Hottest Hottie	Won	
2011	The Twilight Saga: Eclipse	People's Choice Awards	Favorite Movie Actor	Nominated	
2011	The Twilight Saga: Eclipse	People's Choice Awards	Favorite On-screen Team Shared with Robert Pattinson and Kristen Stewart	Won	
2011	The Twilight Saga: Eclipse & Valentine's Day	Golden Raspberry Awards	Worst Actor	Nominated	
2011	The Twilight Saga: Eclipse	Golden Raspberry Awards	Worst Ensemble Shared with the entire cast	Nominated	
2012	The Twilight Saga: Breaking Dawn – Part 1 & Abduction	Golden Raspberry Awards	Worst Actor	Nominated	
2012	The Twilight Saga: Breaking Dawn – Part 1	Golden Raspberry Awards	Worst Screen Couple Shared with Kristen Stewart	Nominated	
2012	The Twilight Saga: Breaking Dawn – Part 1	Golden Raspberry Awards	Worst Ensemble Shared with the entire cast	Nominated	
2012	The Twilight Saga: Breaking Dawn – Part 1	Nickelodeon Kids' Choice Awards	Favorite Buttkicker	Won	
2013	The Twilight Saga: Breaking Dawn – Part 2	Golden Raspberry Awards	Worst Supporting Actor	Won	
2013	The Twilight Saga: Breaking Dawn – Part 2	Golden Raspberry Awards	Worst Screen Couple Shared with Mackenzie Foy	Won	
2013	The Twilight Saga: Breaking Dawn – Part 2	Golden Raspberry Awards	Worst Ensemble Shared with the entire cast	Won	
2013	The Twilight Saga: Breaking Dawn – Part 2	MTV Movie Awards	Best Shirtless Performance	Won	
2013	The Twilight Saga: Breaking Dawn – Part 2	Teen Choice Awards	Actor Sci-Fi/Fantasy	Won	
2013	Himself	Teen Choice Awards	Male Hottie	Nominated	
2013	Himself	Teen Choice Awards	Smile	Nominated	
2014	Grown Ups 2	Golden Raspberry Awards	Worst Supporting Actor	Nominated	
2014	Grown Ups 2	Golden Raspberry Awards	Worst Screen Combo Shared with the entire cast	Nominated	
2017	Run the Tide	Teen Choice Awards	Choice Movie Actor: Drama	Nominated	
2017	Scream Queens	Teen Choice Awards	Choice Scene Stealer	Nominated	
