= Presley Cash =

American actress and musician

- Born: Megan Haun; June 13, 1997 (age 27); Missouri, US
- Years active: 2007–present

Presley Cash (born June 13, 1997) is an American musician and actress, known for starring in Taylor Swift's music videos for the songs "Mean" and "I Can See You".

== Early life ==
Cash was born on June 13, 1997, with the name "Megan Haun", but changed her name to "Presley Cash" because she felt it better represented her. Her grandmothers loved Elvis Presley, and the name "Cash" is a family name. When Cash was 8, she and her mother, Sandra Haun, moved from Sunrise Beach, Missouri to Hollywood to work in the entertainment industry. For the first three years they lived there, they slept on the floor of their apartment. Cash spent her teenage years living in the Oakwood apartments, a temporary housing complex for child actors in Los Angeles.

== Career ==
Cash and her mother were featured in the documentary, The Hollywood Complex, and the TLC special, Raising Fame, which were both about families trying to help their children become famous in Hollywood. In 2021, Cash hosted the talk show, Coffee and Contemplation Live.

=== Work with Taylor Swift ===
In 2011, at age 13, Cash starred alongside Joey King in Swift's music video for "Mean" from the album Speak Now. Cash played a character who was bullied as a child, and grows up to be successful. In 2023, Cash starred with King and Taylor Lautner in Swift's video for the song "I Can See You" from the re-recorded album Speak Now (Taylor's Version). Cash played a character plotting to free Swift from a vault she was trapped in, and assist her in a heist. The video was filmed in Liverpool and directed by Swift. On July 7, 2023, Swift debuted the video at a concert at her The Eras Tour in celebration for the release of Speak Now (Taylor's Version), and invited Cash, King, and Lautner on stage.

== Discography ==
Singles
Title	Year	Reference
La La La I Can't Hear You	2023	
Christmas Lights	2021	
Spoonful of Sugar	2021	
Above Ground Swimming Pool	2020	
Gun	2019	
Broken Heart Land	2011	

== Filmography ==
Movies
Title	Year	Reference
A Star Is Born	2018	
Abide in Me	2011	
Geist	2011	
Taylor Swift: Speak Now World Tour Live	2011	
The Hollywood Complex	2010	
Choose Connor	2007	

Music videos
Title	Year	Artist	Reference
I Can See You	2023	Taylor Swift	
Mean	2011	Taylor Swift	

Television shows
Title	Year	Reference
Coffee and Contemplation Live	2021	
Raising Fame	2013	
Anderson	2012	
Chelsea Lately	2007	
