= The Story of Us (song) =

2011 single by Taylor Swift

Single by Taylor Swift

from the album Speak Now
- Released: April 7, 2011
- Genre: Pop-punk; power pop; dance-pop; new wave
- Length: 4:27
- Label: Big Machine
- Songwriter: Taylor Swift
- Producers: Taylor Swift; Nathan Chapman

Taylor Swift singles chronology
"Mean" (2011)	"The Story of Us" (2011)	"Sparks Fly" (2011)

Music video
- "The Story of Us" on YouTube

"The Story of Us" is a song written and recorded by the American singer-songwriter Taylor Swift for her third studio album, Speak Now (2010). The international mix was released to radio in Europe on April 7, 2011 and the original version was sent to US pop radio on April 19, 2011, as the fourth single from the album. Produced by Swift and Nathan Chapman, the track combines pop-punk, power pop, dance-pop, and new wave with a production consisting of fast-paced drums and dynamic electric guitars. For the lyrics, which are about the awkwardness between two parted lovers, Swift was inspired by her encounter with an ex-boyfriend at an awards show.

In contemporary reviews, music critics praised the uptempo production, but a few commented that it is indiscernible from other radio-friendly pop songs. The single peaked at number 41 on the US Billboard Hot 100 and number 70 on the Canadian Hot 100. It also reached the top 30 on Billboard's airplay charts including Adult Contemporary and Mainstream Top 40. It was certified platinum by the Recording Industry Association of America (RIAA) for surpassing one million digital units.

Noble Jones directed the song's music video, which was filmed at Vanderbilt University in Nashville, Tennessee, and premiered on May 24, 2011. In the video, Swift and her ex-boyfriend, both college students, try to avoid each other when they are in the same library together. Swift performed the track on The Ellen DeGeneres Show and included it in the setlist of the Speak Now World Tour (2011–2012). A re-recorded version, titled "The Story of Us (Taylor's Version)", was released as part of Swift's third re-recorded album Speak Now (Taylor's Version) on July 7, 2023.

== Background and release ==
The American singer-songwriter Taylor Swift began work on her third studio album, Speak Now (2010), two years prior to its release. According to Swift, the album is a collection of songs about the things she had wanted to but could not make to the people she had met in real life. "The Story of Us" was inspired by her encounter with an ex-boyfriend at an awards show. Even though she wanted to strike a conversation with him, she was unable to do so because of the awkwardness she felt. Upon returning home, she told her mother, "I felt like I was standing alone in a crowded room," and then proceeded to write the lyrics. "The Story of Us" was the last track Swift wrote for Speak Now. In an interview with Brian Mansfield for USA Today, Swift said that the subject behind "The Story of Us" was also that behind "Dear John", another Speak Now track.

Before the album's release, Xfinity premiered a preview of "The Story of Us" on October 22, 2010. The song was released as a single to US pop radio on April 19, 2011, by Big Machine Records. A limited-edition CD single was released exclusively through Swift's online store. It was later included in another package that was exclusive to Swift's official store; the package includes the Target exclusive deluxe edition of Speak Now, a free pair of headphones, and one of the three singles for "Sparks Fly", "The Story of Us", or "Mean" CD single.

== Composition ==
"The Story of Us" (2011)
"The Story of Us" is an uptempo track combining pop-punk, power pop, dance-pop, and new wave with dynamic electric guitars and fast-paced drums.

"The Story of Us" is four minutes and 28 seconds long. In contemporary reviews, music critics categorized the song as pop-punk, power pop,, dance-country, dance-pop, and new wave. It has a prominent uptempo pop production incorporating dynamic electric guitars, fast-paced drums, and a post-punk disco beat. Some critics, including Matt Bjorke from Roughstock and Brittany McKenna from Billboard, commented that "The Story of Us" is one of the many Speak Now tracks that lean towards pop music departing from Swift's country music image.

Lyrically, the song is about the awkwardness between two people after they break up. In the narrative, the protagonist and the love interest both attempt to ignore each other while being close in proximity. The protagonist presents each verse as "chapters" in a story, and as the song proceeds, it turns into a "tragedy". Chris Willman of Yahoo! Music thought the key lyrics of the song are "I'd tell you I miss you but I don't know how / I've never heard silence quite this loud," and "I would lay my armor down, if you would say you'd rather love than fight." Leah Greenblatt of Entertainment Weekly considered the lines, "I used to know my place was the spot next to you / Now I'm searching the room for an empty seat / 'Cause lately I don't even know what page you're on," as one of the best lyrics on Speak Now. In PopMatters, Heaton observed that Swift's exploration of the disconnect between fantasy and real life on "The Story of Us" represents the central theme of Speak Now, where she learned to face the disappointment of real life.

== Reception ==
In Speak Now album reviews, some critics were not impressed with the pop-leaning production of "The Story of Us" and commented that the album's strength is the country-leaning songs that play to Swift's strengths. Some others were more receptive, noting the mature perspective departing from the idealistic notion of adolescent romance on Swift's previous album, Fearless (2008). Slant Magazine's Jonathan Keefe, on the contrary, opined that the romantic theme of "The Story of Us", as well as other Speak Now tracks, confined Swift's artistic persona within love and relationships with men, and thus limited her songwriting ability.

On a more positive side, Amanda Hensel of Taste of Country praised the radio-friendly uptempo production. Theon Weber of The Village Voice described the track as "giddy and bombastic". Pitchfork's Sam Sodomsky appreciated the lyrics for displaying Swift's songwriting with specific details resulting in universal feelings. In The Arizona Republic, Ed Masley deemed it one of Swift's catchiest and most relatable singles. Josh Kurp from Uproxx ranked "The Story of Us" sixth on his 2021 ranking of all songs in Swift's discography, particularly praising the production and lyrics.

Following the release of Speak Now, "The Story of Us" debuted and peaked at number 41 on the US Billboard Hot 100 chart dated November 13, 2010. Following its single release, the song re-entered Billboard Hot 100 at number 98 on the week ending May 28, 2011 and reached number 66 on the week ending June 25, 2011. On Billboard's airplay charts, the single peaked within the top 30 of the Mainstream Top 40 (21) and Adult Contemporary (23) charts. It was certified platinum by the Recording Industry Association of America (RIAA) for surpassing one million digital units. Elsewhere, "The Story of Us" peaked at number 70 on the Canadian Hot 100, 33 on the Mahasz chart in Hungary, and 15 on the Ultratip chart in Belgian Flanders.

== Live performances ==
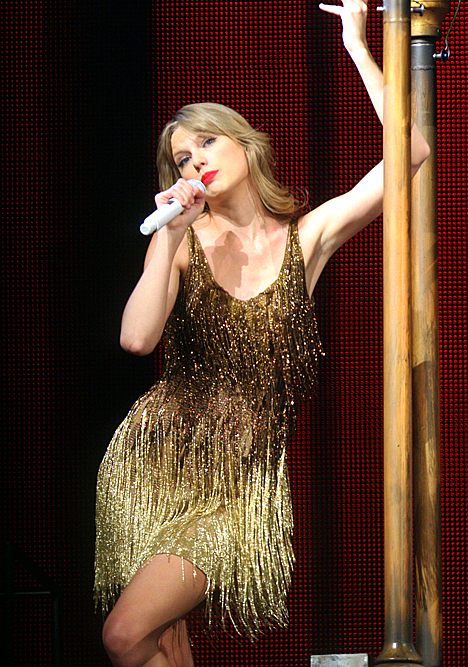
Swift singing "The Story of Us" on the Speak Now World Tour

Swift performed "The Story of Us" for an NBC Speak Now Thanksgiving Special, which broadcast on November 25, 2010. The television special showcased the making of the album along with live performances on a rooftop in New York City. On April 5, 2011, Swift performed an acoustic version of "The Story of Us" for BBC Radio 1's Live Lounge, where she also covered Mumford & Sons's song "White Blank Page" from their album Sigh No More. After its single release, she sang "The Story of Us" on The Ellen DeGeneres Show in May 2011. On the Speak Now World Tour (2011–2012), Swift included it in the setlist. The performance was recorded and released on Swift's live album, Speak Now World Tour – Live (2011). On September 8, 2018, she played the song as a "surprise song" at the Kansas City show of her Reputation Stadium Tour (2018). On June 17, 2023, she performed the song on acoustic guitar at the second show in Pittsburgh during the Eras Tour (2023) as one of the set's two surprise songs. On March 3, 2024, she performed the song again at the second show in Singapore as an acoustic guitar mashup with "Long Story Short" from Evermore (2020).

== Music video ==
The music video for "The Story of Us" was directed by Noble Jones, starring Swift (as the protagonist) and Caleb Campbell (as the ex-boyfriend). Media outlets reported that the video was filmed at Vanderbilt University in Nashville. Prior to the release of the video, Universal Music Group released a promotional music video featuring the European leg of Swift's Speak Now World Tour. In the video, Swift plays a college student. MTV previewed the video on May 20, 2011. The video, as well as an interview with Swift, premiered on MTV four days later. During the interview, Swift said that the video shoot encountered some problems since tornadoes were hitting Nashville. She also said that although all of her previous music videos ended with happy endings, the narrative of "The Story of Us" does not.

In the video, Swift is seen performing while standing in a library, sitting on a desk, and lying across a table with a stack of books next to her. Throughout the video, scenes of her and her ex-boyfriend are juxtaposed with those of the band playing. Swift chooses a seat in the library, but after finding her ex sitting across the table from her, she hides behind a book then looks away, pulling on her clothes and playing with her hair in an attempt to go unnoticed. Unbeknownst to her, he has noticed her and attempts to avoid her as well. The video ends with the students in the library dancing to the song, as Swift and her ex-boyfriend arrive face to face with each other, but eventually they both shrug and walk away.

Some media noticed that the college setting of "The Story of Us" marked a departure from Swift's previous high school-themed music videos. Taste of Country's Amanda Hensel noted that the video's tone is less bright and more somber than that of Swift's previous ones. Kyle Anderson of Entertainment Weekly praised the video for being "a lovely and clever bit of film for Swift" and deemed it a sequel to the music video of "You Belong with Me" (2009), a high school-themed video about an unrequited love.

== Charts ==
Weekly chart performance
Chart (2010–2011)	Peak position
Australia (ARIA)	65
Belgium (Ultratip Bubbling Under Flanders)	15
Canada Hot 100 (Billboard)	70
Canada CHR/Top 40 (Billboard)	44
Canada Hot AC (Billboard)	34
Hungary (Rádiós Top 40)	33
US Billboard Hot 100	41
US Adult Contemporary (Billboard)	23
US Adult Pop Airplay (Billboard)	31
US Country Digital Song Sales (Billboard)	3
US Pop Airplay (Billboard)	21

== Certifications ==
Certifications
Region	Certification	Certified units/sales
Australia (ARIA)	Platinum	70,000^{‡}
Brazil (Pro-Música Brasil)	Gold	30,000^{‡}
New Zealand (RMNZ)	Gold	15,000^{‡}
United Kingdom (BPI)	Silver	200,000^{‡}
United States (RIAA)	Platinum	1,000,000^{‡}
^{‡} Sales+streaming figures based on certification alone.

== "The Story of Us (Taylor's Version)" ==
"The Story of Us (Taylor's Version)"

Song by Taylor Swift

from the album Speak Now (Taylor's Version)
- Released: July 7, 2023
- Studio: Blackbird Studio (Nashville, TN); Kitty Committee Studio (London, England); Prime Recording (Nashville, TN)
- Length: 4:27
- Label: Republic
- Songwriter: Taylor Swift
- Producers: Taylor Swift; Christopher Rowe

Lyric video
- "The Story of Us (Taylor's Version)" on YouTube

After signing a new contract with Republic Records, Swift began re-recording her first six studio albums in November 2020. The decision came after a 2019 public dispute between Swift and the talent manager Scooter Braun, who acquired Big Machine Records, including the masters of Swift's albums the label had released. By re-recording her catalog, Swift had full ownership of the new masters, including the copyright licensing of her songs, devaluing the Big Machine-owned masters.

A re-recorded version of "The Story of Us", titled "The Story of Us (Taylor's Version)", was released on July 7, 2023, via Republic Records as part of Speak Now (Taylor's Version), Swift's third re-recorded album. "The Story of Us (Taylor's Version)" features the identical arrangement as the original, but it has an indie rock edge to it.

=== Personnel ===
Adapted from Speak Now (Taylor's Version) digital album inline notes

- Taylor Swift – vocals, background vocals, songwriter, producer
- Christopher Rowe – producer, vocal engineer
- David Payne – recording engineer
- Lowell Reynolds – assistant recording engineer, editor
- Derek Garten – engineer, editor, programming
- Serban Ghenea – mixing
- Bryce Bordone – mix engineer
- Randy Merrill – mastering
- Matt Billingslea – drums, percussion
- Amos Heller – bass guitar
- Paul Sidoti – electric guitar
- Mike Meadows – acoustic guitar, Hammond B-3, mandolin, background vocals
- Max Bernstein – acoustic guitar, synthesizer
- Liz Huett – background vocals

=== Charts ===
Chart performance for Taylor's version
Chart (2023)	Peak position
Australia (ARIA)	32
Canada Hot 100 (Billboard)	44
Global 200 (Billboard)	31
New Zealand (Recorded Music NZ)	32
Philippines (Billboard)	8
Singapore (RIAS)	20
UK Streaming (OCC)	60
US Billboard Hot 100	42
US Hot Country Songs (Billboard)	20

=== Certifications ===
Certifications for Taylor's Version
Region	Certification	Certified units/sales
Australia (ARIA)	Gold	35,000^{‡}
^{‡} Sales+streaming figures based on certification alone.
