= Collins Pennie =

American actor

Collins Curtis Pennie
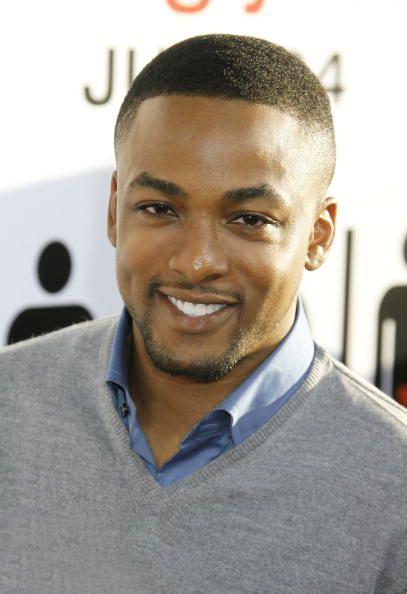
- Collins Pennie in 2010
- Born: June 20, 1985 (age 41); Brooklyn, New York, U.S.
- Occupation: Actor
- Years active: 2002–2015

Collins Pennie (born June 20, 1985) is an American former actor. He is known for his roles in Prom Night as Ronnie Heflin, and in In Time as Time Keeper Jaeger. He also starred in the films Fame and Stomp the Yard: Homecoming.

== Early life ==
Pennie was born in Fort Greene, Brooklyn. He is of Trinidadian descent.

== Career ==
Pennie began his career with roles on NBC's hit drama Law & Order and as a drug-addicted thief on Without a Trace. His television work quickly caught the eye of Ford Model Management, who signed Pennie, leading him to a successful "ck one" fragrance campaign for Calvin Klein.

Pennie currently resides in Los Angeles, New York and Atlanta. While not on camera, he spends most of his time dancing, writing and mastering his many crafts.

Pennie hit the stage in the summer of 2010, appearing in Rent with actors Neil Patrick Harris and Wayne Brady, performing in a three-day limited engagement at the Hollywood Bowl. Pennie's prolific dance moves also landed him the lead male role in Beyonce's "Run the World (Girls)" video, which was released May 18, 2011.

Pennie has also continued to work in film, appearing in Ryan Fleck's award-winning Half Nelson (2007) opposite Ryan Gosling and Shareeka Epps. He had lead roles in Prom Night (2008) and the musical Fame (2009), an adaptation of the 1980 cult classic. In 2010, Collins had the lead role in Stomp the Yard: Homecoming, in which he played Chance Harris, a college student struggling to balance between his school, work, relationships and opportunity to perform in the national step competition. On television, Collins starred on the hit series hospital drama Hawthorne, where he worked alongside Jada Pinkett Smith and Michael Vartan. He also appeared in the Fox Feature film In Time, starring opposite Justin Timberlake, Amanda Seyfried and Cillian Murphy. In early 2013 Collins made his return to television in Regina King's directorial debut, Let The Church Say Amen. The film was based on ReShonda Tate Billingley's 2005 novel of the same name. Royal Ties, the company King runs with her sister, Reina King, produced this film for BET Networks alongside Queen Latifah's Flava Unit Company.

=== Television ===
In 2004, Pennie made his television debut on the long-running NBC crime-drama Law & Order. He has since starred on other television shows such as Without a Trace, and played Marcus Leeds in the hospital drama Hawthorne.

=== Film ===
Pennie has appeared in Half Nelson (2007), the 2008 version of Prom Night, and the musical Fame, an adaptation of the 1980 cult classic. In 2010, he had the lead role in Stomp the Yard: Homecoming. In 2011, he appeared in the film In Time, starring Justin Timberlake and Amanda Seyfried.

In September 2012, Pennie starred in actress Regina King's directorial debut Let The Church Say Amen which is adapted from ReShonda Tate Billingsley's 2005 best-selling novel. The film premiered on BET in 2013. Pennie retired from acting in 2015.

=== Theater ===
In the summer of 2010, Pennie appeared in Rent with actors Neil Patrick Harris and Wayne Brady in a three-day limited engagement at the Hollywood Bowl.

==== Music video ====
Pennie played the lead male role in Beyoncé's "Run The World (Girls)" video, which was released 18 May 2011 on Beyoncé's website and American Idol.

== Filmography ==
Film
Year	Film	Role
2005	God's Forgotten House	Dwain
2006	Half Nelson	Mike
2008	Prom Night	Ronnie Hefflin
2009	Fired Up!	Adam
2009	Fame	Malik Washburn
2010	Stomp the Yard: Homecoming	Chance Harris
2011	In Time	Timekeeper Jaeger
2013	Reckless	

Television
Year	Title	Role	Notes
2002	As the World Turns	Sean	2 episodes
2004	Law & Order	Jimmy Gordon	1 episode
2004	All Falls Down	Tyronw	TV movie
2005	Without a Trace	Chris	1 episode
2007	Shark	Lewis Beamon	1 episode
2007	Hell on Earth	Jared	TV movie
2008	CSI: Miami	Tommy	2 episodes
2010	Hawthorne	Marcus Leeds	9 episodes
2010	CSI: Miami	Shane Newsome	1 episode
2013	Let the Church Say Amen	Jonathan Jackson	A BET original movie
2013	Revenge	Eli	2 episodes
