= Pop Rocks (film) =

2004 American television movie directed by Ron Lagomarsino

- Screenplay by: William Ryan; Dan Berendsen
- Story by: William Ryan
- Directed by: Ron Lagomarsino
- Starring: Gary Cole; Sherilyn Fenn
- Music by: David Lawrence; Michael Bradford; (original songs)
- Country of origin: United States
- Original language: English

Production
- Executive producer: Patricia Clifford
- Editor: Craig Bench
- Running time: 120 minutes
- Production companies: ABC Family Productions; Patricia Clifford Productions

Original release
- Network: ABC Family
- Release: September 10, 2004

Pop Rocks is a 2004 American television film starring Gary Cole and Sherilyn Fenn that aired on ABC Family on September 10, 2004.

== Plot ==
Bank loan officer Jerry Harden has his life turned upside down when a scruffy-looking guitarist named Izzy shows up at his bank office. It is revealed that Jerry was a member of a hard rock/glam metal band called Rock Toxin, and the members are planning a one-time-only reunion. Jerry is reluctant, as he prefers suburbia to the wild rock lifestyle he left behind, but is forced to reconsider when he finds that he does not have enough money to send his 17-year-old daughter Olivia to college.

Since Jerry has not told his wife Allison about being in the band, he embarks upon living a hectic double life: nerdish pillar of society by day and heavily-made-up rock singer by night. Since the group Rock Toxin wore heavy "Kiss"-like makeup, he does not think anyone will ever find out about his alternative persona, but this is when his troubles truly begin. Jerry fights to keep his past hidden while taking part in the concert which all the town will be attending. But only the truth can save his family if it is not too late.

== Cast ==
- Gary Cole as Jerry "Dagger" Harden
- Sherilyn Fenn as Allison Harden
- David Jensen as Izzy
- Douglas M. Griffin as Stu
- Dane Hereford as Ramone
- Asher Book as Liam Harden
- Johanna Braddy as Olivia Harden
- Joe Inscoe as Carl Hunter
- Shannon Eubanks as Helen Hunter
- Wilbur Fitzgerald as Donaldson
- McKinley Freeman as the TV Host

== Production ==
With the death of ABC Family programming executive Linda Mancuso in December 2003, Disney Channel original programming leaders, executive vice president of original programming and production Gary Marsh and original movies vice president Michael Healy took charge over ABC Family's original movies unit in early 2004. They move away from the planned romantic comedies to green light two telefilms, Crimes of Fashion and Head Rush. By May 10, 2004, Head Rush was renamed Pop Rocks! and had signed its two lead actors, Gary Cole and Sherilyn Fenn. Patricia Clifford was signed on as executive producer and Ron Lagomarsino as director. The movie was filmed in New Orleans.

== Reception ==
Reviewer Phil Gallo of Variety considered the film to have potential but fell "flat" in being humorless and silly.
