= Fame (2009 film) =

2009 film by Kevin Tancharoen

- Theatrical release poster
- Directed by: Kevin Tancharoen
- Screenplay by: Allison Burnett
- Based on: Fame; 1980 film by Christopher Gore
- Produced by: Richard Wright; Mark Canton; Tom Rosenberg; Gary Lucchesi
- Starring: Debbie Allen; Charles S. Dutton; Kelsey Grammer; Megan Mullally; Bebe Neuwirth; Asher Book; Kristy Flores; Paul Iacono; Paul McGill; Naturi Naughton; Kay Panabaker; Kherington Payne; Collins Pennie; Walter Perez; Anna Maria Perez de Tagle
- Cinematography: Scott Kevan
- Edited by: Myron Kerstein
- Music by: Mark Isham
- Production companies: Metro-Goldwyn-Mayer; United Artists; Lakeshore Entertainment; Mark Canton Productions
- Distributed by: MGM Distribution Co. (North America); Lakeshore International (International)
- Release dates: September 23, 2009 (The Grove Theatre); September 25, 2009 (United States)
- Running time: 107 minutes
- Country: United States
- Language: English
- Budget: $18 million
- Box office: $77.2 million

Fame is a 2009 American teen musical drama film directed by Kevin Tancharoen from a screenplay by Allison Burnett. It is a remake of the 1980 film of the same name. The film follows talented high school students attending The High School of Performing Arts in New York City, where students get specialized training that often leads to success in the entertainment industry.

Fame premiered at The Grove Theatre in Los Angeles, California on September 23, 2009, and was released in the United States on September 25, by MGM Distribution Co. The film received generally negative reviews from critics, but was moderately successful, grossing $77.2 million worldwide against a production budget of $18 million.

== Cast ==
The main cast is featured on the official website.

Students

- Collins Pennie as Malik Washburn
- Kay Panabaker as Jenny Garrison
- Asher Book as Marco Ramonte
- Paul Iacono as Neil Baczynsky
- Naturi Naughton as Denise Dupree
- Anna Maria Perez de Tagle as Joy Moy
- Paul McGill as Kevin Barrett
- Kherington Payne as Alice Ellerton
- Walter Perez as Victor Tavares
- Kristy Flores as Rosie Martinez

Teachers and staff

- Debbie Allen as Principal Angela Simms
- Charles S. Dutton as Mr. Alvin Dowd
- Bebe Neuwirth as Ms. Lynn Kraft
- Megan Mullally as Ms. Fran Rowan
- Kelsey Grammer as Mr. Joel Cranston

Other characters

- Cody Longo as Andy Matthews
- Dale Godboldo as Music executive
- Michael Hyatt as Mrs. Washburn
- James Read and Laura Johnson as Mr. and Mrs. Ellerton
- Julius Tennon and April Grace as Mr. and Mrs. Dupree
- Howard Gutman as Mr. Baczynsky
- Ryan Surratt as Eddie
- Marcus Hopson as Face
- Johanna Braddy as Katie

== Release ==
=== Critical response ===
"Why bother to remake Fame if you don't have a clue about why the 1980 movie was special? Why take a touching experience and make it into a shallow exercise? Why begin with a R-rated look at plausible kids with real problems and tame it into a PG-rated after-school special? Why cast actors who are sometimes too old and experienced to play seniors, let alone freshmen?"

— Roger Ebert

Fame was poorly received by critics. On the review aggregator website Rotten Tomatoes, 23% of 119 critics' reviews are positive, with an average rating of 4.5/10. The website's consensus reads: "Fame is ultimately undone by its choppy editing, its incomplete characterizations, and its apparent desire to appeal to the High School Musical generation." Metacritic, which uses a weighted average, assigned the film a score of 39 out of 100, based on 26 critics, indicating "generally unfavorable" reviews.

On At the Movies, Michael Phillips gave the film a "See It" while A. O. Scott gave the film a "Skip It". Parker voiced his disapproval of the remake and described it as an "awful" film.

Maureen Teefy also criticized the film, stating, "They're using the same formula, but it doesn't have the same substance. It's not staying true to the grittiness and authenticity of the original."

=== Box office ===
Fame opened at third place behind Cloudy with a Chance of Meatballs and the newly released Surrogates with approximately $10,011,682. The film has grossed $22,455,510 domestically and $50,930,003 in the foreign market with an international gross of $73,385,513, making it a moderate box office success.

== Soundtrack ==
The soundtrack was released on September 7, 2009. It features a blend of American standards and new pieces, written specifically for the movie. Included from the original film are the piano ballad "Out Here on My Own" and the title theme "Fame" (both sung by Irene Cara for the 1980 original film). There's a version of the theme song with a verse by Collins Pennie, but didn't make the album, although it was included in The Radio Mixes EP of the song and there was made a music video for it to promote the film.

=== Track listing ===
1. "Welcome to P.A." – Raney Shockne
2. "Fame" – Naturi Naughton
3. "Big Things" – Anjulie
4. "Ordinary People" – Asher Book
5. "This Is My Life" – Hopsin, Ak'Sent, Tynisha Keli & Donte "Burger" Winston
6. "Out Here on My Own" – Naturi Naughton
7. "Street Hustlin'" – Raney Shockne feat. Stella Moon
8. "You'll Find a Way" (Switch & Sinden Remix) – Santigold
9. "Can't Hide from Love" – Naturi Naughton & Collins Pennie
10. "Black & Gold" – Sam Sparro
11. "Back to Back" – Collins Pennie feat. Ashleigh Haney
12. "I Put a Spell on You" – Raney Shockne feat. Eddie Wakes
13. "Get On the Floor" – Naturi Naughton & Collins Pennie
14. "Try" – Asher Book
15. "You Took Advantage of Me" – Megan Mullally
16. "Too Many Women" (Damon Elliott Remix) – Rachael Sage
17. "Someone to Watch Over Me" – Asher Book
18. "You Made Me Love You" – Raney Shockne feat. Oren Waters
19. "Hold Your Dream" – Kay Panabaker, Asher Book & Naturi Naughton

Additionally, a More Music From Fame and two solo albums by Naturi Naughton and Collins Pennie titled Fame Presents Naturi Naughton as Denise: Didn't I Tell You? and Fame Presents Collins Pennie as Malik: Best Believe That were released in February 2010.
