= V Factory =

US boy band

- Also known as: V Factory
- Origin: Hawaii; Virginia; South Carolina; Pennsylvania; Tennessee
- Genres: Pop, R&B, Urban
- Years active: 2006 - 2011
- Label: Warner Bros. Records
- Members: Jared Murillo; Nathaniel Flatt; Nick Teti
- Past members: Asher Monroe; Wesley Quinn

V Factory was an American pop/R&B/urban boy band produced by former pop artist Tommy Page.

The members have yet to confirm what the "V" stands for. Wesley Quinn, in an interview with Popstar! Magazine, stated that "the V is a hidden meaning between the five of us."

== History ==
On April 29, 2008, their EP These Are The Days was released on iTunes (in the US. It included the tracks "Round and Round", "She Bad" (featuring E-40), and "These Are the Days". On January 12, 2009, it was released in the UK and other countries.

V Factory performed at the Bandemonium Tour alongside Menudo, Mark and James, and NLT. The tour ran from May 1, 2008 to May 26, 2008.

V Factory's first single, "Love Struck", was released to iTunes on February 3, 2009. It played recurringly on Radio Disney, premiering on Music Mailbag. Its peak on mainstream radio was #37 and #70 on the Pop 100. The song was produced by Swedish production team twin and written by David Jassy and Darin. "Love Struck" was released on iTunes in the UK and other countries on 9 September. The "Love Struck" music video was released officially on May 22, 2009 on AOL Music.

== Past Members ==
- Jared Murillo (born August 6, 1988) from Honolulu, Hawaii. He is most known for being Ashley Tisdale's ex-boyfriend. Murillo is known for his appearances as a featured dancer in High School Musical, its nationwide tour, and High School Musical 2, for which he also earned an Assistant Choreographer credit by creating the dance number for "I Don't Dance". He was also the dance partner of Lacey Schwimmer. He was one of the professional dancers in the UK's Strictly Come Dancing (2010).
- Nick "Nicky T" Teti (born July 22, 1983) from Philadelphia, Pennsylvania. Teti got his start doing musical theater in high school. Subsequently, Teti taught himself dance in college. He was a member of the dance crew Quest Crew.
- Nathaniel Flatt (born September 18, 1981) from Cookeville, Tennessee. Flatt launched his acting career in local plays and eventually found his way into musical theater, including a stage production of Disney's Aladdin at Disney California Adventure.
- Asher Monroe (born September 18, 1988) from Arlington, Virginia. Monroe was the lead singer, but in October 2010 he wrote on his official Twitter: "I love you sooo much vfactory fans! U have been amazing but I'm no longer with the group! It's been a ride and yes we are all still friends!".
- Wesley Quinn (born January 16, 1990) from Greenville, South Carolina. He began performing at age 6 after attending his younger sister’s dance recital. He was a backup dancer for Ashley Tisdale with fellow V Factory member, Jared Murillo. Quinn has performed numerous times as a background dancer in the FOX show Glee.

== Discography ==
=== Extended plays ===
- 2008: These Are the Days

Track listing

1. "Round & Round"
2. "She Bad" (featuring E-40)
3. "These Are the Days"

=== Singles ===
Year	Single	Chart positions			
Year	Single	U.S. Dance	U.S. Pop	CAN	SWE
2009	"Love Struck"	44	37	94	47

=== Other songs ===
- "History"
- "Burning Up"
- "Lights Camera Action"
- "Catch 22"
- "Get Up"
- "Outta Control"
- "Treat a Lady"
- "My Beautiful Girl"
- "For You"
- "I Can Change Your Life"
- "Doin' It Too"
- "Them Hot Girls"
- "In It For The Love"
- "Fade"
- "Pump It"

== Tours ==
- Bandemonium Tour [with Menudo, NLT] (2008)

Date (2008)	City	Country	Venue
May 1	Las Vegas	United States	House of Blues
May 3	San Francisco	United States	Great American Music Hall
May 4	San Diego	United States	House of Blues
May 5	Los Angeles	United States	House Of Blues
May 6	Anaheim	United States	House of Blues
May 8	Englewood	United States	Gothic Theatre
May 10	Dallas	United States	House of Blues
May 13	Chicago	United States	House of Blues
May 14	Cleveland	United States	House of Blues
May 15	Detroit	United States	Saint Andrew's Hall
May 17	New York City	United States	Gramercy Theatre
May 18	Westbury	United States	North Fork Theatre
May 19	Philadelphia	United States	Theatre of Living Arts
May 20	Asbury Park	United States	The Stone Pony
May 22	Myrtle Beach	United States	House of Blues
May 26	Orlando	United States	House of Blues

- Love Struck Tour (2009)

Date (2009)	City	Country	Venue
May 1	Greenville, South Carolina	United States	Unknown
May 6	New Haven, Connecticut	United States	Unknown
May 8	Canton, Ohio	United States	Unknown
May 14	Minneapolis, Minnesota	United States	Unknown
May 22	Allentown, Pennsylvania	United States	Unknown
May 23	Harrisburg, Pennsylvania	United States	Unknown
May 28	Tulsa, Oklahoma	United States	Unknown
May 29	Oklahoma City, Oklahoma	United States	Unknown
May 31	Lafayette, Louisiana	United States	Unknown
June 3	Buffalo, New York	United States	Unknown
June 5	New Bedford, Massachusetts	United States	Unknown
June 6	Providence, Rhode Island	United States	Unknown
June 7	Portland, Maine	United States	Unknown
July 3	Memphis, Tennessee	United States	Unknown
