= Hurt (2009 film) =

- Poster Art
- Directed by: Barbara Stepansky
- Screenplay by: Barbara Stepansky; Alison Lea Bingeman
- Story by: Eduardo Levy; James Martin
- Produced by: Eduardo Levy; James Martin; Nikolette Orlandou
- Starring: Melora Walters; William Mapother; Johanna E. Braddy; Jackson Rathbone; Ava Gaudet; Sofia Vassilieva
- Cinematography: Ralph Kaechele
- Edited by: Rita DaSilva
- Music by: David Julyan; Dana Niu
- Distributed by: High Treason Productions; Inferno Films Productions; Circus Road Films monterey media (U.S.)
- Release date: November 10, 2009
- Country: United States
- Language: English

Hurt is an American drama film released in 2009. The film was directed by Barbara Stepansky and stars Melora Walters, William Mapother, Sofia Vassilieva, and Jackson Rathbone.

== Synopsis ==
The Coltrane family's life has been devastated by an untimely death. Widowed Helen Coltrane (Melora Walters), along with her teenage son, Conrad (Jackson Rathbone) and daughter Lenore, are given shelter by her reclusive and quirky gun-loving brother-in-law, Daryl. As they grapple with the reality of their shattered, altered life and twist of fate, coincidence steps in with a seemingly lovely foster child, Sarah (Sofia Vassilieva), who appears touting a story that Helen's husband had pledged to take her in. A macabre story of deception unfolds.

After bringing Sarah to live with them at Daryl's car salvage yard, horrible things begin to happen. Lenore's pet duckling is found murdered; Conrad's girlfriend goes missing; Sarah attempts to lure one of the local wild wolves into the junkyard with a piece of raw meat; and someone uses Daryl's new video camera to film Helen in the shower.

When Lenore goes into town to look into Sarah's past, she discovers that her father was living a double life: he is Sarah's real father, and she is Conrad's and Lenore's half-sister. Meanwhile, back at the junkyard, Sarah begins picking off the family members. She uses a rock to scratch a long scar across the Ford Fairlane that Daryl has been working on; she releases the rope holding up one of Conrad's heavy sheet metal art pieces; and she switches Helen's insulin bottles so that Helen overdoses. As Helen is dying, Sarah tells her the truth about how her abusive mother caused the accident that killed her father, Helen's husband.

Lenore makes it back to the yard in time to save her mother, and although Conrad has been crushed under his art installation, he is still alive. Sarah lures Lenore across an old, rusty tanker truck that collapses, trapping Lenore in the tank. There, she sees the corpse of Conrad's girlfriend, who was also lured there by Sarah. Sarah also lures the wolf into the tanker, and it starts to eat the corpse.

Helen hears Lenore calling for help and runs to the garage to get a rope to pull Lenore out of the tank. She discovers that Daryl has hanged himself, but quickly returns to help her daughter. Sarah threatens them with a gun, but Lenore hits the tanker with a metal rod, cracking it so badly that the spot under Sarah's feet gives way, and she falls to her death on a sharp spike.

Helen helps Conrad and Lenore into Daryl's truck, and takes the key from his body. They drive towards town.

== Cast ==
- Melora Walters as Helen Coltrane
- William Mapother as Darryl Coltrane
- Johanna E. Braddy as Lenore Coltrane
- Sofia Vassilieva as Sarah Parsons
- Jackson Rathbone as Conrad Coltrane
- Ava Gaudet as Elise Montoya
- Cameron Goodman as Kate
- Erik Eidem as the Talk Show Host/Radio DJ (voice)
- Valorie Hubbard as the Real Estate Agent
- Linda Bisesti as the Social Worker
- David Nathan Schwartz as Bill
- Bruce Nozick as Franklin Goodell

== Production ==
The film was shot in California, more specifically Agua Dulce and Los Angeles. It was completed as of September 8, 2008 On September 1, 2008, the film's official website announced that Hurt would be represented by Inferno Films Productions (foreign sales) and Circus Road Films (domestic sales).
