= Wausau Daily Herald =

Newspaper in Wausau, Wisconsin, US

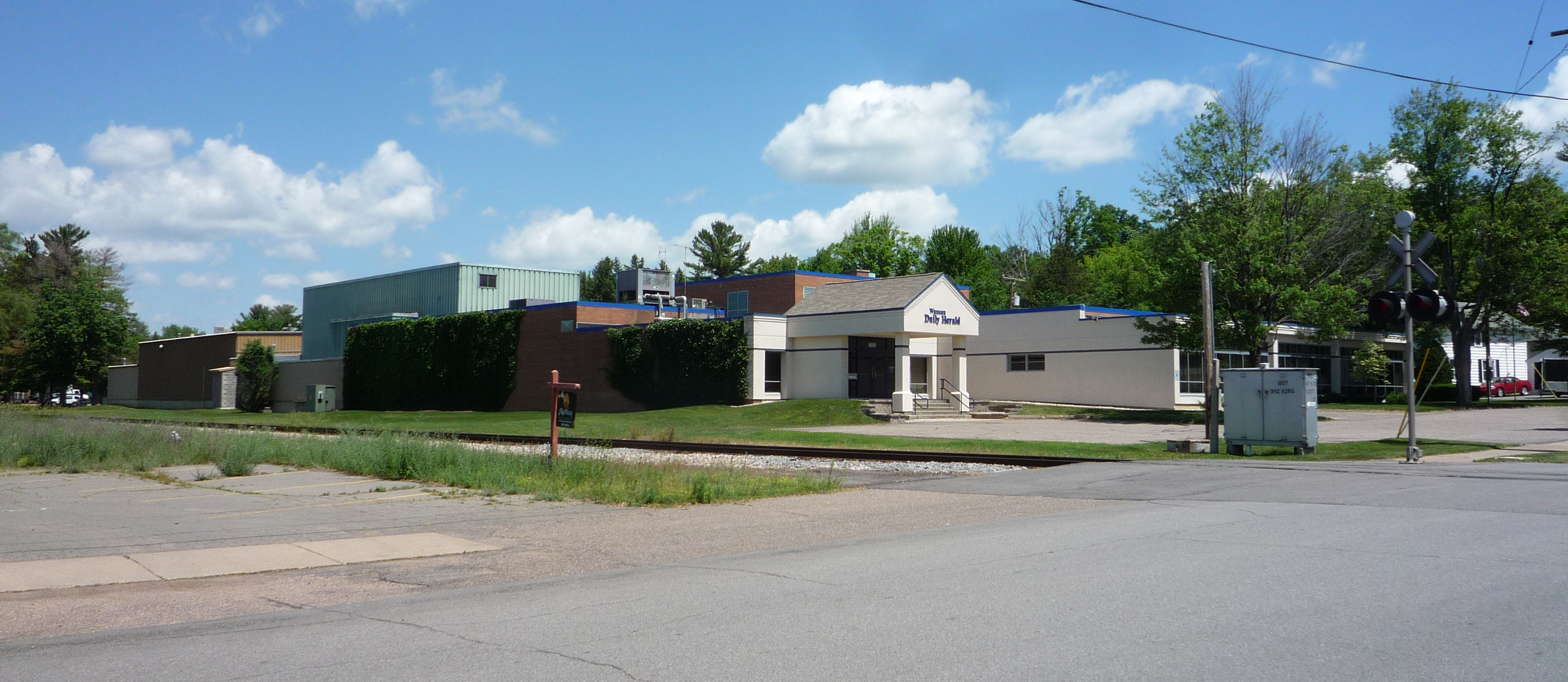
- The Wausau Daily Herald's former offices on Scott Street, Wausau
- Type: Daily newspaper
- Format: Broadsheet
- Owner: USA Today Co.
- Publisher: Andy Fisher
- Editor: Jamie Rokus
- Founded: 1907
- Headquarters: Wausau, WI
- Circulation: 15,000 (as of 2022)
- ISSN: 0887-4271
- Website: wausaudailyherald.com

The Wausau Daily Herald is a daily morning broadsheet printed in Wausau, Wisconsin. It is the primary newspaper in Wausau and is distributed throughout Marathon and Lincoln counties. The Daily Herald is owned by the USA Today Co., which owns ten other newspapers in Wisconsin.

== History ==
The paper traces its roots to a paper established as the Torch of Liberty in 1875. After a series of mergers and renamings, it eventually became known as the Wausau Daily Record-Herald in 1907, with the first edition being printed on 2 December of that year. In 1958 it moved into offices on Scott Street in Wausau.

In 2017 Gannett announced the closure of the newspaper's printing plant in Wausau, with production moved to Appleton. In 2018 the Appleton facility was also closed with printing moved to a facility in West Milwaukee. In August 2021 the sale of the Daily Herald's Scott Street offices in Wausau was announced by Gannett.

== Recognition ==
The Wausau Daily Herald was a 1985 finalist for the Pulitzer Prize for Explanatory Journalism for "a special section on Wausau's growing Indochinese refugee population, the Hmong" by Pam Sprague and Rob Orcutt.
