= List of accolades received by Boyhood (film) =

Boyhood is a 2014 American coming-of-age drama film written and directed by Richard Linklater and starring Patricia Arquette, Ellar Coltrane, Lorelei Linklater and Ethan Hawke.

== Awards and accolades ==
Awards
Award	Date of ceremony	Category	Recipients	Result
AACTA International Awards	January 31, 2015	Best Film	Boyhood	Nominated
AACTA International Awards	January 31, 2015	Best Direction	Richard Linklater	Nominated
AACTA International Awards	January 31, 2015	Best Screenplay	Richard Linklater	Nominated
AACTA International Awards	January 31, 2015	Best Supporting Actor	Ethan Hawke	Nominated
AACTA International Awards	January 31, 2015	Best Supporting Actress	Patricia Arquette	Won
Academy Awards	February 22, 2015	Best Picture	Richard Linklater and Cathleen Sutherland	Nominated
Academy Awards	February 22, 2015	Best Director	Richard Linklater	Nominated
Academy Awards	February 22, 2015	Best Supporting Actor	Ethan Hawke	Nominated
Academy Awards	February 22, 2015	Best Supporting Actress	Patricia Arquette	Won
Academy Awards	February 22, 2015	Best Original Screenplay	Richard Linklater	Nominated
Academy Awards	February 22, 2015	Best Film Editing	Sandra Adair	Nominated
Alliance of Women Film Journalists	January 12, 2015	Best Film	Boyhood	Won
Alliance of Women Film Journalists	January 12, 2015	Best Director	Richard Linklater	Won
Alliance of Women Film Journalists	January 12, 2015	Best Supporting Actress	Patricia Arquette	Nominated
Alliance of Women Film Journalists	January 12, 2015	Best Original Screenplay	Richard Linklater	Nominated
Alliance of Women Film Journalists	January 12, 2015	Best Editing	Sandra Adair	Nominated
Alliance of Women Film Journalists	January 12, 2015	Best Ensemble Cast (to casting director)	Beth Sepko	Nominated
ACE Eddie Awards	January 30, 2015	Best Edited Feature Film – Dramatic	Sandra Adair	Won
Austin Film Critics Association	December 17, 2014	Best Film	Boyhood	Won
Austin Film Critics Association	December 17, 2014	Best Director	Richard Linklater	Won
Austin Film Critics Association	December 17, 2014	Best Supporting Actress	Patricia Arquette	Won
Austin Film Critics Association	December 17, 2014	Best Austin Film	Boyhood	Won
Austin Film Critics Association	December 17, 2014	Top Ten Films	Boyhood	1st Place
American Film Institute	December 9, 2014	Top Ten Films of the Year	Boyhood	Won
Belgian Film Critics Association	January 10, 2015	Grand Prix	Boyhood	Nominated
Berlin International Film Festival	February 15, 2014	Best Director	Richard Linklater	Won
Berlin International Film Festival	February 15, 2014	Prize of the Guild of German Art House Cinemas	Boyhood	Won
Berlin International Film Festival	February 15, 2014	Reader Jury of the Berliner Morgenpost	Boyhood	Won
Berlin International Film Festival	February 15, 2014	Golden Bear	Boyhood	Nominated
Boston Society of Film Critics	December 7, 2014	Best Film	Boyhood	Won
Boston Society of Film Critics	December 7, 2014	Best Director	Richard Linklater	Won
Boston Society of Film Critics	December 7, 2014	Best Screenplay	Richard Linklater (tie)	Won
Boston Society of Film Critics	December 7, 2014	Best Film Editing	Sandra Adair	Won
Boston Society of Film Critics	December 7, 2014	Best Ensemble Cast	Boyhood	Won
British Academy Film Awards	February 8, 2015	Best Film	Boyhood	Won
British Academy Film Awards	February 8, 2015	Best Direction	Richard Linklater	Won
British Academy Film Awards	February 8, 2015	Best Original Screenplay	Richard Linklater	Nominated
British Academy Film Awards	February 8, 2015	Best Actor in a Supporting Role	Ethan Hawke	Nominated
British Academy Film Awards	February 8, 2015	Best Actress in a Supporting Role	Patricia Arquette	Won
British Independent Film Awards	December 7, 2014	Best International Independent Film	Boyhood	Won
Casting Society of America	January 22, 2015	Low Budget Drama	Beth Sepko	Won
César Award	February 20, 2015	Best Foreign Film	Boyhood	Nominated
Chicago Film Critics Association	December 16, 2014	Best Film	Boyhood	Won
Chicago Film Critics Association	December 16, 2014	Best Director	Richard Linklater	Won
Chicago Film Critics Association	December 16, 2014	Best Supporting Actor	Ethan Hawke	Nominated
Chicago Film Critics Association	December 16, 2014	Best Supporting Actress	Patricia Arquette	Won
Chicago Film Critics Association	December 16, 2014	Best Original Screenplay	Richard Linklater	Nominated
Chicago Film Critics Association	December 16, 2014	Best Editing	Sandra Adair	Nominated
Chicago Film Critics Association	December 16, 2014	Most Promising Performer	Ellar Coltrane	Nominated
Costume Designers Guild	February 17, 2015	Excellence in Contemporary Film	Kari Perkins	Nominated
Critics' Choice Movie Awards	January 15, 2015	Best Picture	Boyhood	Won
Critics' Choice Movie Awards	January 15, 2015	Best Director	Richard Linklater	Won
Critics' Choice Movie Awards	January 15, 2015	Best Supporting Actor	Ethan Hawke	Nominated
Critics' Choice Movie Awards	January 15, 2015	Best Supporting Actress	Patricia Arquette	Won
Critics' Choice Movie Awards	January 15, 2015	Best Acting Ensemble	Boyhood cast	Nominated
Critics' Choice Movie Awards	January 15, 2015	Best Original Screenplay	Richard Linklater	Nominated
Critics' Choice Movie Awards	January 15, 2015	Best Editing	Sandra Adair	Nominated
Critics' Choice Movie Awards	January 15, 2015	Best Young Performer	Ellar Coltrane	Won
Dallas–Fort Worth Film Critics Association	December 15, 2014	Top 10 Films	Boyhood	2nd Place
Dallas–Fort Worth Film Critics Association	December 15, 2014	Best Supporting Actor	Ethan Hawke	3rd Place
Dallas–Fort Worth Film Critics Association	December 15, 2014	Best Supporting Actress	Patricia Arquette	1st Place
Dallas–Fort Worth Film Critics Association	December 15, 2014	Best Director	Richard Linklater	2nd Place
Dallas–Fort Worth Film Critics Association	December 15, 2014	Best Screenplay	Richard Linklater	2nd Place
Dallas–Fort Worth Film Critics Association	December 15, 2014	Russell Smith Award	Boyhood	Won
Denver Film Critics Society	January 12, 2015	Best Picture	Boyhood	Nominated
Denver Film Critics Society	January 12, 2015	Best Director	Richard Linklater	Won
Denver Film Critics Society	January 12, 2015	Best Supporting Actor	Ethan Hawke	Nominated
Denver Film Critics Society	January 12, 2015	Best Supporting Actress	Patricia Arquette	Won
Denver Film Critics Society	January 12, 2015	Best Original Screenplay	Richard Linklater	Nominated
Detroit Film Critics Society	December 15, 2014	Best Film	Boyhood	Won
Detroit Film Critics Society	December 15, 2014	Best Director	Richard Linklater	Won
Detroit Film Critics Society	December 15, 2014	Best Supporting Actor	Ethan Hawke	Nominated
Detroit Film Critics Society	December 15, 2014	Best Supporting Actress	Patricia Arquette	Won
Detroit Film Critics Society	December 15, 2014	Best Ensemble		Nominated
Detroit Film Critics Society	December 15, 2014	Best Screenplay	Richard Linklater	Won
Directors Guild of America Award	February 7, 2015	Outstanding Directing – Feature Film	Richard Linklater	Nominated
Dublin Film Critics' Circle	December 17, 2014	Top 10 Films	Boyhood	Won
Dublin Film Critics' Circle	December 17, 2014	Best Director	Richard Linklater	Won
Dublin Film Critics' Circle	December 17, 2014	Best Actress	Patricia Arquette	5th Place
Empire Awards	March 29, 2015	Best Film	Boyhood	Nominated
Empire Awards	March 29, 2015	Best Director	Richard Linklater	Nominated
Empire Awards	March 29, 2015	Best Male Newcomer	Ellar Coltrane	Nominated
Florida Film Critics Circle	December 19, 2014	Best Picture	Boyhood	2nd Place
Florida Film Critics Circle	December 19, 2014	Best Supporting Actress	Patricia Arquette	Won
Florida Film Critics Circle	December 19, 2014	Best Ensemble		2nd Place
Florida Film Critics Circle	December 19, 2014	Best Director	Richard Linklater	Won
Florida Film Critics Circle	December 19, 2014	Best Original Screenplay	Richard Linklater	Nominated
Golden Globe Award	January 11, 2015	Best Motion Picture – Drama	Boyhood	Won
Golden Globe Award	January 11, 2015	Best Director	Richard Linklater	Won
Golden Globe Award	January 11, 2015	Best Supporting Actress	Patricia Arquette	Won
Golden Globe Award	January 11, 2015	Best Supporting Actor	Ethan Hawke	Nominated
Golden Globe Award	January 11, 2015	Best Screenplay	Richard Linklater	Nominated
Gotham Independent Film Awards	December 1, 2014	Best Feature	Boyhood	Nominated
Gotham Independent Film Awards	December 1, 2014	Best Actor	Ethan Hawke	Nominated
Gotham Independent Film Awards	December 1, 2014	Best Actress	Patricia Arquette	Nominated
Gotham Independent Film Awards	December 1, 2014	Breakthrough Actor	Ellar Coltrane	Nominated
Gotham Independent Film Awards	December 1, 2014	Audience Award	Boyhood	Won
Guldbagge Awards	January 26, 2015	Best Foreign Film		Nominated
Houston Film Critics Society Awards	January 12, 2015	Best Picture	Boyhood	Won
Houston Film Critics Society Awards	January 12, 2015	Best Director	Richard Linklater	Won
Houston Film Critics Society Awards	January 12, 2015	Best Supporting Actor	Ethan Hawke	Nominated
Houston Film Critics Society Awards	January 12, 2015	Best Supporting Actress	Patricia Arquette	Won
Houston Film Critics Society Awards	January 12, 2015	Best Screenplay	Richard Linklater	Won
Houston Film Critics Society Awards	January 12, 2015	Texas Independent Film Award	Boyhood	Won
Houston Film Critics Society Awards	January 12, 2015	Technical Achievement	Boyhood	Won
Independent Spirit Awards	February 21, 2015	Best Film	Boyhood	Nominated
Independent Spirit Awards	February 21, 2015	Best Director	Richard Linklater	Won
Independent Spirit Awards	February 21, 2015	Best Supporting Female	Patricia Arquette	Won
Independent Spirit Awards	February 21, 2015	Best Supporting Male	Ethan Hawke	Nominated
Independent Spirit Awards	February 21, 2015	Best Editing	Sandra Adair	Nominated
Irish Film and Television Awards	May 24, 2015	Best International Film	Boyhood	Won
Irish Film and Television Awards	May 24, 2015	Best International Actress	Patricia Arquette	Nominated
London Film Critics' Circle	January 18, 2015	Film of the Year	Boyhood	Won
London Film Critics' Circle	January 18, 2015	Supporting Actor of the Year	Ethan Hawke	Nominated
London Film Critics' Circle	January 18, 2015	Supporting Actress of the Year	Patricia Arquette	Won
London Film Critics' Circle	January 18, 2015	Director of the Year	Richard Linklater	Won
London Film Critics' Circle	January 18, 2015	Screenwriter of the Year	Richard Linklater	Nominated
Los Angeles Film Critics Association	December 7, 2014	Best Film	Boyhood	Won
Los Angeles Film Critics Association	December 7, 2014	Best Actress	Patricia Arquette	Won
Los Angeles Film Critics Association	December 7, 2014	Best Director	Richard Linklater	Won
Los Angeles Film Critics Association	December 7, 2014	Best Editing	Sandra Adair	Won
MTV Movie Awards	April 12, 2015	Movie of the Year	Boyhood	Nominated
MTV Movie Awards	April 12, 2015	Breakthrough Performance	Ellar Coltrane	Nominated
MTV Movie Awards	April 12, 2015	Best On-Screen Transformation	Ellar Coltrane	Nominated
National Board of Review Awards	January 6, 2015	Top Ten Films	Boyhood	Won
National Society of Film Critics	January 3, 2015	Best Film	Boyhood	2nd Place
National Society of Film Critics	January 3, 2015	Best Director	Richard Linklater	Won
National Society of Film Critics	January 3, 2015	Best Supporting Actress	Patricia Arquette	Won
New York Film Critics Circle	January 5, 2015	Best Film	Boyhood	Won
New York Film Critics Circle	January 5, 2015	Best Director	Richard Linklater	Won
New York Film Critics Circle	January 5, 2015	Best Supporting Actress	Patricia Arquette	Won
New York Film Critics Online	December 8, 2014	Top Films	Boyhood	Won
New York Film Critics Online	December 8, 2014	Best Picture	Boyhood	Won
New York Film Critics Online	December 8, 2014	Best Director	Richard Linklater	Won
New York Film Critics Online	December 8, 2014	Best Supporting Actress	Patricia Arquette	Won
Norwegian International Film Festival	August 22, 2014	Norwegian Film Critics Award	Boyhood	Won
Online Film Critics Society Awards	December 15, 2014	Best Picture	Boyhood	Nominated
Online Film Critics Society Awards	December 15, 2014	Best Director	Richard Linklater	Won
Online Film Critics Society Awards	December 15, 2014	Best Supporting Actor	Ethan Hawke	Nominated
Online Film Critics Society Awards	December 15, 2014	Best Supporting Actress	Patricia Arquette	Won
Online Film Critics Society Awards	December 15, 2014	Best Original Screenplay	Boyhood	Nominated
Online Film Critics Society Awards	December 15, 2014	Best Editing	Boyhood	Nominated
Producers Guild of America Awards	January 24, 2015	Best Theatrical Motion Picture	Richard Linklater, Cathleen Sutherland	Nominated
San Diego Film Critics Society Awards	December 15, 2014	Best Film	Boyhood	Nominated
San Diego Film Critics Society Awards	December 15, 2014	Best Director	Richard Linklater	Nominated
San Diego Film Critics Society Awards	December 15, 2014	Best Supporting Actor	Ethan Hawke	Nominated
San Diego Film Critics Society Awards	December 15, 2014	Best Supporting Actress	Patricia Arquette	Nominated
San Diego Film Critics Society Awards	December 15, 2014	Best Original Screenplay	Richard Linklater	Nominated
San Diego Film Critics Society Awards	December 15, 2014	Best Editing	Sandra Adair	Nominated
San Diego Film Critics Society Awards	December 15, 2014	Best Performance by an Ensemble		Nominated
San Francisco Film Critics Circle Awards	December 14, 2014	Best Picture	Boyhood	Won
San Francisco Film Critics Circle Awards	December 14, 2014	Best Director	Richard Linklater	Won
San Francisco Film Critics Circle Awards	December 14, 2014	Best Supporting Actress	Patricia Arquette	Won
San Francisco Film Critics Circle Awards	December 14, 2014	Best Editing	Sandra Adair	Won
San Francisco Film Critics Circle Awards	December 14, 2014	Best Supporting Actor	Ethan Hawke	Nominated
San Francisco Film Critics Circle Awards	December 14, 2014	Best Original Screenplay	Richard Linklater	Nominated
San Francisco International Film Festival	May 2, 2014	Founder’s Directing Award	Richard Linklater	Won
Satellite Awards	February 15, 2015	Best Film	Boyhood	Nominated
Satellite Awards	February 15, 2015	Best Director	Richard Linklater	Won
Satellite Awards	February 15, 2015	Best Supporting Actor	Ethan Hawke	Nominated
Satellite Awards	February 15, 2015	Best Supporting Actress	Patricia Arquette	Won
Satellite Awards	February 15, 2015	Best Original Screenplay	Richard Linklater	Nominated
Satellite Awards	February 15, 2015	Best Editing	Sandra Adair	Nominated
Satellite Awards	February 15, 2015	Best Original Song	Split the Difference	Nominated
Screen Actors Guild Awards	January 25, 2015	Outstanding Performance by a Cast in a Motion Picture	Patricia Arquette, Ellar Coltrane, Ethan Hawke, Lorelei Linklater	Nominated
Screen Actors Guild Awards	January 25, 2015	Outstanding Performance by a Male Actor in a Supporting Role	Ethan Hawke	Nominated
Screen Actors Guild Awards	January 25, 2015	Outstanding Performance by a Female Actor in a Supporting Role	Patricia Arquette	Won
Seattle International Film Festival	June 8, 2014	Best Film	Boyhood	Won
Seattle International Film Festival	June 8, 2014	Best Director	Richard Linklater	Won
Seattle International Film Festival	June 8, 2014	Best Actress	Patricia Arquette	Won
St. Louis Film Critics Association Awards	December 15, 2014	Best Film	Boyhood	Won
St. Louis Film Critics Association Awards	December 15, 2014	Best Director	Richard Linklater	Nominated
St. Louis Film Critics Association Awards	December 15, 2014	Best Supporting Actor	Ethan Hawke	Nominated
St. Louis Film Critics Association Awards	December 15, 2014	Best Supporting Actress	Patricia Arquette	Won
St. Louis Film Critics Association Awards	December 15, 2014	Best Original Screenplay	Richard Linklater	Nominated
St. Louis Film Critics Association Awards	December 15, 2014	St. Louis Film Critics Association Award for Best Soundtrack	Boyhood	Nominated
St. Louis Film Critics Association Awards	December 15, 2014	St. Louis Film Critics Association Award for Best Art-House or Festival Film	Boyhood	Nominated
SXSW Film Festival	March 11, 2014	Louis Black Lone Star Award	Boyhood	Won
Sydney Film Festival	June 15, 2014	Sydney Film Prize	Boyhood	Nominated
Toronto Film Critics Association	December 16, 2014	Best Film	Boyhood	Won
Toronto Film Critics Association	December 16, 2014	Best Supporting Actress	Patricia Arquette	Won
Toronto Film Critics Association	December 16, 2014	Best Director	Richard Linklater	Won
Toronto Film Critics Association	December 16, 2014	Best Screenplay	Richard Linklater	Runner-up
Vancouver Film Critics Circle	January 5, 2015	Best Film	Boyhood	Won
Vancouver Film Critics Circle	January 5, 2015	Best Director	Richard Linklater	Nominated
Vancouver Film Critics Circle	January 5, 2015	Best Supporting Actress	Patricia Arquette	Won
Vancouver Film Critics Circle	January 5, 2015	Best Screenplay	Richard Linklater	Nominated
Washington D.C. Area Film Critics Association Awards	December 8, 2014	Best Film	Boyhood	Won
Washington D.C. Area Film Critics Association Awards	December 8, 2014	Best Director	Richard Linklater	Won
Washington D.C. Area Film Critics Association Awards	December 8, 2014	Best Supporting Actor	Ethan Hawke	Nominated
Washington D.C. Area Film Critics Association Awards	December 8, 2014	Best Supporting Actress	Patricia Arquette	Won
Washington D.C. Area Film Critics Association Awards	December 8, 2014	Best Ensemble		Nominated
Washington D.C. Area Film Critics Association Awards	December 8, 2014	Best Youth Performance	Ellar Coltrane	Won
Washington D.C. Area Film Critics Association Awards	December 8, 2014	Best Original Screenplay	Richard Linklater	Nominated
Washington D.C. Area Film Critics Association Awards	December 8, 2014	Best Editing	Sandra Adair	Nominated
Women Film Critics Circle	December 16, 2014	Best Young Actress	Lorelei Linklater	Nominated
Women Film Critics Circle	December 16, 2014	The Invisible Woman Award	Patricia Arquette	Nominated
Women Film Critics Circle	December 16, 2014	Best Screen Couple		Nominated
Writers Guild of America Awards	February 14, 2015	Best Original Screenplay	Richard Linklater	Nominated
