= Boston Society of Film Critics Award for Best Cast =

Annual US film award

The Boston Society of Film Critics Award for Best Cast is one of the annual film awards given by the Boston Society of Film Critics.

== Winners ==
=== 2000s ===
- 2003: Mystic River

Kevin Bacon, Laurence Fishburne, Marcia Gay Harden, Laura Linney, Sean Penn, and Tim Robbins

- 2004: Sideways

Thomas Haden Church, Paul Giamatti, Virginia Madsen, and Sandra Oh

- 2005: Syriana

George Clooney, Chris Cooper, Matt Damon, Kayvan Novak, Amanda Peet, Christopher Plummer, and Jeffrey Wright

- 2006: United 93

- 2007: Before the Devil Knows You're Dead

Albert Finney, Rosemary Harris, Ethan Hawke, Philip Seymour Hoffman, and Marisa Tomei

- 2008: Tropic Thunder

Jay Baruchel, Jack Black, Steve Coogan, Tom Cruise, Robert Downey Jr., Bill Hader, Brandon T. Jackson, Reggie Lee, Danny McBride, Matthew McConaughey, Nick Nolte, Brandon Soo Hoo, and Ben Stiller

- 2009: Precious / Star Trek (TIE)

Stephanie Andujar, Mariah Carey, Lenny Kravitz, Chyna Layne, Mo'Nique, Paula Patton, Amina Robinson, Sherri Shepherd, Gabourey Sidibe, and Angelic Zambrana
Eric Bana, John Cho, Clifton Collins Jr., Ben Cross, Bruce Greenwood, Chris Pine, Zachary Quinto, Zoe Saldaña, Karl Urban, and Anton Yelchin

=== 2010s ===
- 2010: The Fighter

Amy Adams, Christian Bale, Melissa Leo, Jack McGee, and Mark Wahlberg

- 2011: Carnage

Jodie Foster, John C. Reilly, Christoph Waltz, and Kate Winslet

- 2012: Seven Psychopaths

Abbie Cornish, Colin Farrell, Woody Harrelson, Olga Kurylenko, Sam Rockwell, Tom Waits, and Christopher Walken

- 2013: Nebraska

Bruce Dern, Will Forte, Stacy Keach, Bob Odenkirk, and June Squibb

- 2014: Boyhood

Ellar Coltrane, Patricia Arquette, Lorelei Linklater, and Ethan Hawke

- 2015: Spotlight

Michael Keaton, Mark Ruffalo, Rachel McAdams, Stanley Tucci, Liev Schreiber, Brian d'Arcy James, and John Slattery

- 2016: Moonlight

Mahershala Ali, Alex R. Hibbert, Naomie Harris, André Holland, Jharrel Jerome, Janelle Monáe, Jaden Piner, Trevante Rhodes, and Ashton Sanders

- 2017: The Meyerowitz Stories

Candice Bergen, Judd Hirsch, Dustin Hoffman, Elizabeth Marvel, Rebecca Miller, Grace Van Patten, Adam Sandler, Ben Stiller, and Emma Thompson

- 2018: Shoplifters

Lily Franky, Sakura Ando, Mayu Matsuoka, Kairi Jō, Miyu Sasaki and Kirin Kiki

- 2019: Little Women

Saoirse Ronan, Emma Watson, Florence Pugh, Eliza Scanlen, Laura Dern, Timothée Chalamet, Meryl Streep, Tracy Letts, Bob Odenkirk, James Norton, Louis Garrel and Chris Cooper

=== 2020s ===
- 2020: Ma Rainey's Black Bottom

Chadwick Boseman, Viola Davis, Colman Domingo, Michael Potts, and Glynn Turman

- 2021: Licorice Pizza

Alana Haim, Cooper Hoffman, Sean Penn, Tom Waits, Bradley Cooper and Benny Safdie

- 2022: Women Talking / Jackass Forever (TIE)
- 2023: Oppenheimer
- 2024: Sing Sing
- 2025: Marty Supreme

== Actors in multiple winning films (2 or more) ==
- Robert Downey Jr. - 2
- Bob Odenkirk - 2
- Sean Penn - 2
- Ben Stiller - 2
- Tom Waits - 2

== See also ==
- Robert Altman Award
