= Jacob Artist =

American actor, singer, and dancer (born 1992)

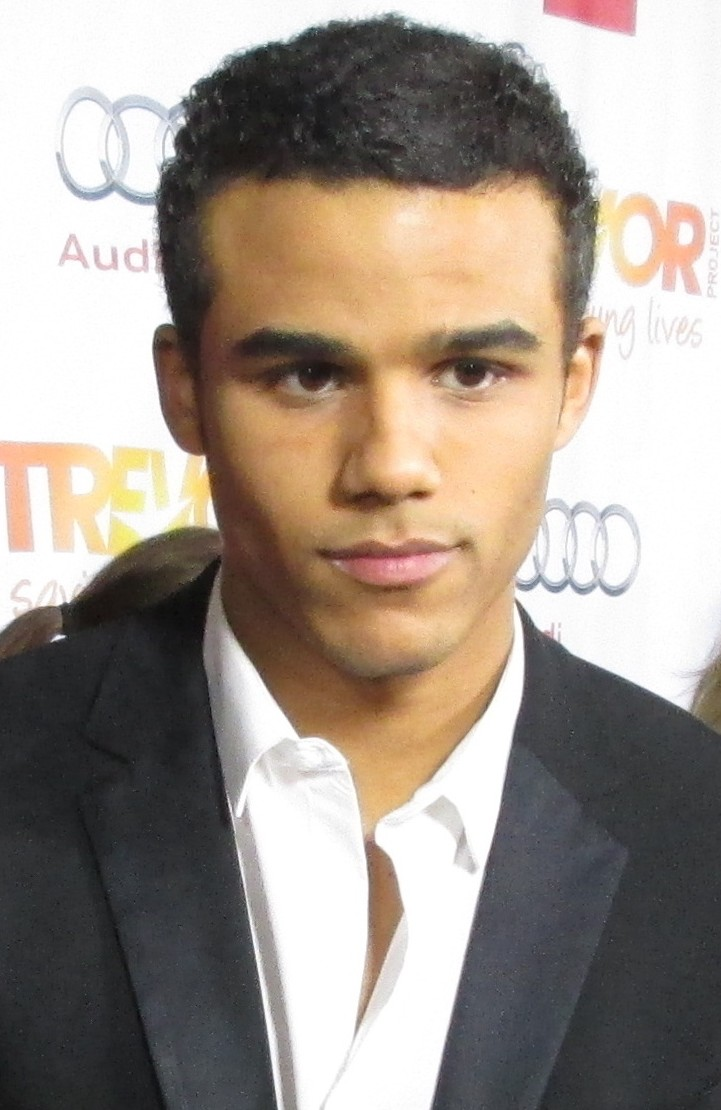
- Artist in December 2013
- Born: October 17, 1992 (age 33); Buffalo, New York, U.S.
- Occupations: Actor; singer; dancer
- Years active: 2011–present

Jacob Artist (born October 17, 1992) is an American actor, singer, and dancer. He is best known for his roles as Jake Puckerman on the Fox musical comedy-drama series Glee and as Brandon Fletcher on the ABC drama-thriller series Quantico.

== Early life ==
Artist was born in Buffalo, New York to Darrell and Judith Artist, and grew up in Williamsville, New York. His father is African American, while his mother is of Polish descent. He has a younger sister named Jenna. He took lessons through the Community Music School in Buffalo, New York.

In 2010, Artist graduated from Williamsville South High School a semester early, and was accepted into the Juilliard School for dance. However, he declined Juilliard's offer to pursue an acting career.

== Career ==
After high school graduation, Artist moved to Los Angeles, where he appeared in an episode of Bucket & Skinner's Epic Adventures and in the television film Blue Lagoon: The Awakening. In July 2012, he was cast in the Fox musical comedy-drama series Glee as Jake Puckerman, the younger half-brother of Noah "Puck" Puckerman. He began appearing in the fourth season premiere and was upgraded to the main cast for the fifth season. At the series' conclusion in 2015, he had featured in 36 episodes.

In 2015, Artist joined the ABC drama-thriller series Quantico, playing the role of Brandon Fletcher, an FBI recruit at the training academy in Quantico, Virginia. Artist guest starred as Todd Connors in the ninth episode of the FX horror anthology series American Horror Story: Roanoke. He then starred alongside John Cusack and Ellar Coltrane in the thriller film Blood Money. Artist has a recurring role in the second season of The Arrangement as Wes Blaker.

In 2019, Artist appeared in a recurring role as Isaac in the Starz surreal comedy series Now Apocalypse from pioneering New Queer Cinema filmmaker Gregg Araki. This was the third collaboration between Artist and Araki following his 2014 appearance in Araki's White Bird in a Blizzard as well as the 2015 short film Here Now. He then starred alongside former Quantico co-star Johanna Braddy in the 2020 coming-of-age comedy The Get Together.

== Filmography ==
=== Film ===
Year	Title	Role	Notes
2013	A Man Walks into a Bar	Barman	Short film
2013	After the Dark	Parker	
2014	White Bird in a Blizzard	Oliver	
2015	Here Now	Cowboy	Short film
2017	Blood Money	Jeff	
2018	Haunting on Fraternity Row	Jason	
2020	The Get Together	Damien	
2026	Kill Code	Kyron	Post-production

=== Television ===
Year	Title	Role	Notes
2011	Bucket & Skinner's Epic Adventures	Jimmy	Episode: "Epic Babysitters"
2012	How to Rock	Dean Hollis	2 episodes
2012	Blue Lagoon: The Awakening	Stephen Sullivan	Television film
2012	Melissa and Joey	Cameron	Episode: "Wherefore Art Thou Lennox"
2012–15	Glee	Jake Puckerman	Recurring role (season 4); main role (season 5); Guest star (season 6) 37 episodes
2015–16	Quantico	Brandon Fletcher	Recurring role (season 1); 14 episodes
2016	American Horror Story: Roanoke	Todd Connors	Episode: "Chapter 9"
2018	The Arrangement	Wes Blaker	Season 2 (recurring)
2019	Now Apocalypse	Isaac	Recurring role, 4 episodes
