= Buck Alamo =

- Directed by: Ben Epstein
- Written by: Ben Epstein
- Starring: Sonny Carl Davis; Lorelei Linklater; Chase Joliet; Kriston Woodreaux; Lee Eddy; C.K. McFarland; James Epstein; George Ensle; Bruce Dern
- Release date: September 18, 2020 (Oldenburg)
- Country: United States
- Language: English

Buck Alamo or (A Phantasmagorical Ballad), or simply Buck Alamo, is a 2020 American film written and directed by Ben Epstein and starring Sonny Carl Davis, Lorelei Linklater, Chase Joliet, Kriston Woodreaux, Lee Eddy, C.K. McFarland, James Epstein, George Ensle and Bruce Dern.

== Cast ==
- Sonny Carl Davis
- Lorelei Linklater
- Lee Eddy
- Kriston Woodreaux
- Chase Joliet
- George Ensle
- James Epstein
- C.K. McFarland
- Bruce Dern

== Release ==
The film premiered at the Oldenburg International Film Festival on September 18, 2020.

== Reception ==
The film has a 100% rating on Rotten Tomatoes. Lorry Kikta of Film Threat gave the film an 8 out of 10.

Shelagh Rowan-Legg of Screen Anarchy gave the film a positive review and wrote, "...Davis imbues Eli with a deep heart and a soul that is as poetic as it is caustic."
