= McCaul Lombardi =

American actor (born 1991)

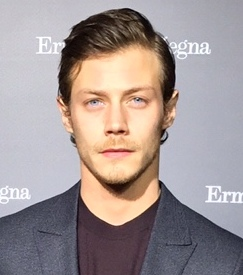
- Lombardi in 2017
- Born: May 20, 1991 (age 35); Baltimore, Maryland
- Occupation: Actor
- Years active: 2016–present

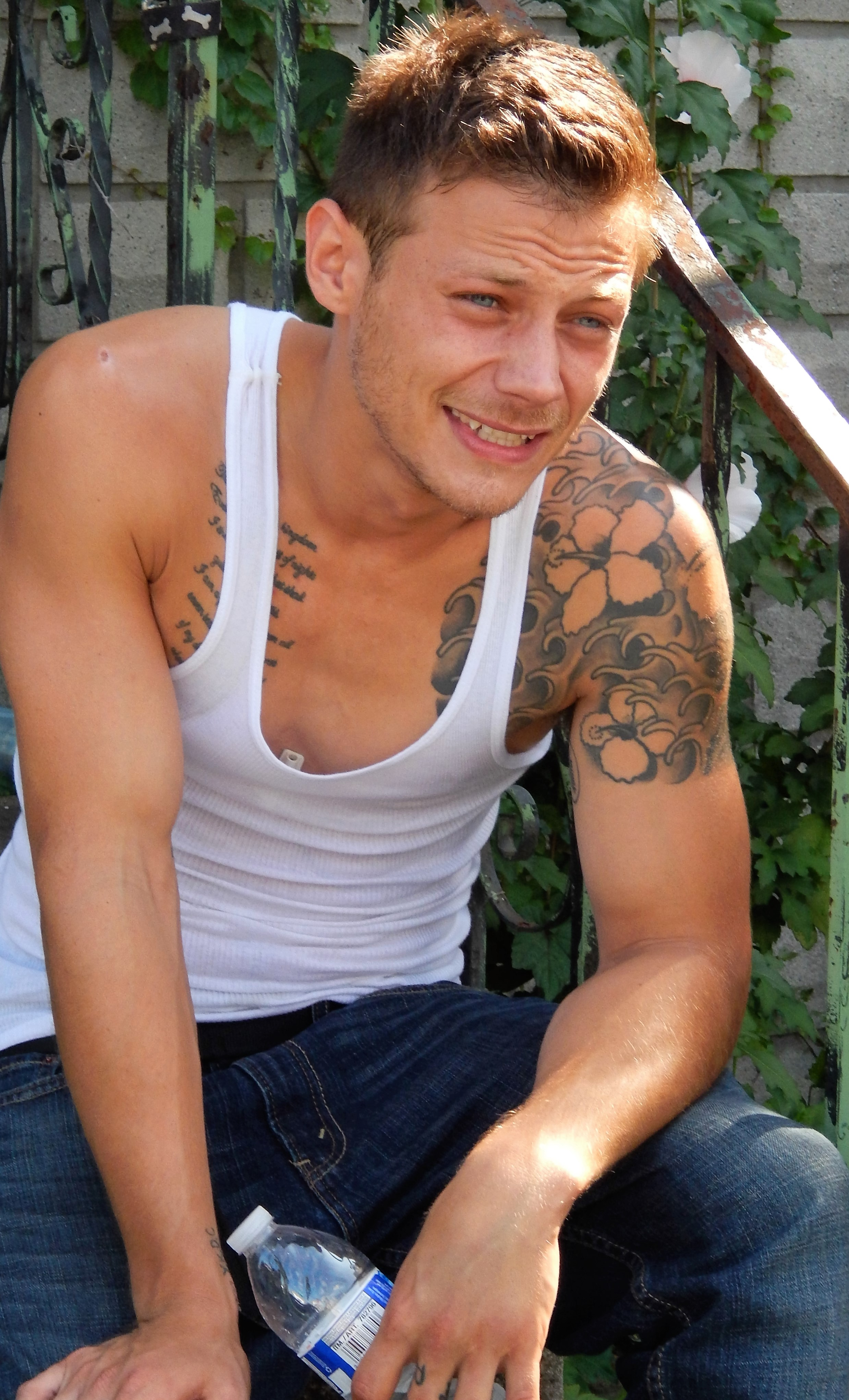
Lombardi in 2016

McCaul Lombardi (born May 20, 1991) is an American actor. Born in Baltimore City, Maryland, he is known for his roles in American Honey, which won the Jury Prize at the 2016 Cannes Film Festival; and Patti Cake$ - which had its world premiere at the 2017 Sundance Film Festival, was acquired by Fox Searchlight, and was the closing night film during Directors' Fortnight at the 2017 Cannes Film Festival.

== Career ==
Lombardi moved to Los Angeles to pursue becoming an actor. Lombardi made his film debut in American Honey, about a magazine crew traveling across the country, written and directed by Andrea Arnold. The film had its world premiere at the 2016 Cannes Film Festival and was distributed domestically by A24. Lombardi has two films awaiting release, including: Killing Animals opposite Joey King; and We, the Coyotes, which premiered at ACID (Association for Independent Cinema and its Distribution) during the 2018 Cannes Film Festival. Lombardi's latest release Sollers Point, directed by Matt Porterfield, was released in North America from 11 May 2018, selected as The New York Times' "Critic's Pick", and ThePlaylist.net wrote that Lombardi "convey[ed] that complexity in a thrillingly physical and non-theatrical performance" and rated the film A−.

In early 2017, Lombardi appeared in a major worldwide advertising campaign for Ermenegildo Zegna with Robert De Niro; and in 2016, Lombardi appeared in a campaign for eyewear brand Oliver Peoples.

== Filmography ==
=== Film ===
Year	Title	Role	Notes	Release Notes
	Bodyhackers	Denver Blake		
	Bruha			
2023	Deadland	Ray Hitchcock		SXSW 2023
2022	The Inspection	Harvey		TIFF 2022
2019	Port Authority	Lee		2019 Cannes Film Festival
2018	Sollers Point	Keith		Oscilloscope Laboratories
2018	Anywhere With You	Jake		2018 Cannes Film Festival
2017	Patti Cake$	Danny		Fox Searchlight, 2017 Cannes Film Festival, 2017 Sundance Film Festival
2016	American Honey	Corey		Film4, A24, 2016 Cannes Film Festival, 2016 Toronto International Film Festival
2015	Age of the Moon	Ronny Feldman		
2014	Mindless	Rhex		
