= The Inspection =

- Theatrical release poster
- Directed by: Elegance Bratton
- Written by: Elegance Bratton
- Produced by: Effie T. Brown; Chester Algernal Gordon
- Starring: Jeremy Pope; Raúl Castillo; McCaul Lombardi; Aaron Dominguez; Nicholas Logan; Eman Esfandi; Andrew Kai; Aubrey Joseph; Bokeem Woodbine; Gabrielle Union
- Cinematography: Lachlan Milne; Mark Jeevaratnam
- Edited by: Oriana Soddu
- Music by: Animal Collective
- Production companies: A24; Gamechanger Films; Freedom Principle
- Distributed by: A24
- Release dates: September 8, 2022 (TIFF); November 18, 2022 (United States)
- Running time: 95 minutes
- Country: United States
- Language: English
- Budget: $3 million
- Box office: $406,644

The Inspection is a 2022 American drama film written and directed by Elegance Bratton. Inspired by Bratton's real-life experiences, the film follows a young gay black man who defiantly endures brutal training at a Marine Corps boot camp, seeking approval from his homophobic mother. It stars Jeremy Pope, Raúl Castillo, McCaul Lombardi, Aaron Dominguez, Nicholas Logan, Eman Esfandi, Andrew Kai, Aubrey Joseph, Bokeem Woodbine, and Gabrielle Union.

The Inspection had its world premiere at the 2022 Toronto International Film Festival on September 8, 2022, and was theatrically released in the United States on November 18 by A24. The film received generally positive reviews from critics, with Pope's performance being praised and earning a Golden Globe nomination.

== Synopsis ==
Ellis French enlists in the Marine Corps and ends up at boot camp on Parris Island, South Carolina. He initially meets the physical requirements, but is not as successful in disguising his sexual orientation, making him the target of a near-lethal hazing from drill instructor Leland Laws and a fellow recruit, Laurence Harvey.

== Cast ==
- Jeremy Pope as Ellis French
- Raúl Castillo as Rosales
- Bokeem Woodbine as Leland Laws
- Gabrielle Union as Inez French
- McCaul Lombardi as Laurence Harvey
- Aaron Dominguez as Castro
- Nicholas Logan as Brooks
- Eman Esfandi as Ismail
- Andrew Kai Tripodi as Label
- Aubrey Joseph as Boles
- Brad Napp as Graduation officer

== Production ==
In June 2021, it was announced Jeremy Pope, Gabrielle Union, Bokeem Woodbine and Raúl Castillo had joined the cast of the film, with Elegance Bratton directing from a screenplay he wrote, with Gamechanger Films set to produce, and A24 set to produce and distribute. Principal photography concluded by November 2021.

=== Music ===
Bratton enlisted Animal Collective to compose and perform a score for the film. The soundtrack album, which features a collaboration with Indigo De Souza titled "Wish I Knew You", was released on November 18. Art pop musician Serpentwithfeet composed "The Hands", featured in the film's end credits.

== Release ==
The film had its world premiere at the 2022 Toronto International Film Festival on September 8, 2022. It also screened at the 60th New York Film Festival on October 14, 2022. It was released in the United States on November 18, 2022.

The film was released for VOD on January 24, 2023, followed by a Blu-ray and DVD release on February 21, 2023.

== Reception ==
=== Critical response ===
On the review aggregator website Rotten Tomatoes, 88% of 141 critics' reviews are positive, with an average rating of 7.1/10. The website's consensus reads: "Although it's frustratingly clumsy in certain respects, The Inspection is an affecting actors' showcase in service of some truly worthy themes." Metacritic, which uses a weighted average, assigned the film a score of 73 out of 100, based on 33 critics, indicating "generally favorable" reviews.

Dieter Oßwald, film correspondent for the Guild of German Film Art Theaters, writes that Bratton's impressive feature debut, which he describes as a "queer Full Metal Jacket", tells of a chapter of intolerance, discrimination and homophobia in the U.S., where until 2005 the official motto in the U.S. military was still "don't ask, don't tell" and coming out in uniform was considered unthinkable. In this context, Oßwald quotes an instructor in the film: "If we kicked all the gays out of the Army, there would be no more Marines." Showing such an ambivalent figure is part of the dramaturgical cleverness of the drama, which does not leave conflicts in the cliché, but deliberately presents the contradictions.

=== Accolades ===
Award	Date of ceremony	Category	Recipient(s)	Result	Ref.
AARP Movies for Grownups Awards	January 28, 2023	Best Supporting Actress	Gabrielle Union	Nominated	
African-American Film Critics Association	December 8, 2022	Best Actor	Jeremy Pope	Won	
Alliance of Women Film Journalists	January 5, 2023	Best Actor	Jeremy Pope	Nominated	
Black Reel Awards	February 6, 2023	Outstanding Independent Film	The Inspection	Won	
Black Reel Awards	February 6, 2023	Outstanding Director	Elegance Bratton	Nominated	
Black Reel Awards	February 6, 2023	Outstanding Screenplay	Elegance Bratton	Nominated	
Black Reel Awards	February 6, 2023	Outstanding Emerging Director	Elegance Bratton	Nominated	
Black Reel Awards	February 6, 2023	Outstanding First Screenplay	Elegance Bratton	Won	
Black Reel Awards	February 6, 2023	Outstanding Actor	Jeremy Pope	Won	
Black Reel Awards	February 6, 2023	Outstanding Breakthrough Performance, Male	Jeremy Pope	Won	
Black Reel Awards	February 6, 2023	Outstanding Supporting Actor	Bokeem Woodbine	Nominated	
Black Reel Awards	February 6, 2023	Outstanding Supporting Actress	Gabrielle Union	Nominated	
Black Reel Awards	February 6, 2023	Outstanding Ensemble - Casting Director	Kim Coleman	Nominated	
GLAAD Media Awards	March 30, 2023	Outstanding Film – Limited Release	The Inspection	Won	
Golden Globe Awards	January 10, 2023	Best Actor in a Motion Picture – Drama	Jeremy Pope	Nominated	
Hollywood Critics Association Creative Arts Awards	February 17, 2023	Best First Feature	Elegance Bratton	Nominated	
Houston Film Critics Society	February 18, 2023	Best New Filmmaker	Elegance Bratton	Nominated	
Independent Spirit Awards	March 4, 2023	Best Lead Performance	Jeremy Pope	Nominated	
Independent Spirit Awards	March 4, 2023	Best Supporting Performance	Gabrielle Union	Nominated	
Independent Spirit Awards	March 4, 2023	Best First Feature	Elegance Bratton, Effie T. Brown, Chester Algernal Gordon	Nominated	
National Board of Review Awards	December 8, 2022	Top Ten Independent Films	The Inspection	Won	
NAACP Image Awards	February 25, 2023	Outstanding Independent Motion Picture	The Inspection	Won	
Palm Springs International Film Festival	January 13, 2023	Directors to Watch Award	Elegance Bratton	Won	
Santa Barbara International Film Festival	January 13, 2023	Virtuoso Award	Jeremy Pope	Won	
