= Blood Money (2017 film) =

- Directed by: Lucky McKee
- Screenplay by: Jared Butler; Lars Norberg
- Produced by: David Buelow; David Tish; Lee Nelson
- Starring: John Cusack; Ellar Coltrane; Willa Fitzgerald; Jacob Artist
- Cinematography: Alex Vendler
- Edited by: Zach Passero
- Music by: Matt Gates
- Production companies: Radiant Films International; Hoylake; EMA
- Distributed by: Saban Films
- Release date: October 13, 2017 (United States)
- Running time: 89 minutes
- Country: United States
- Language: English

Blood Money (originally titled Misfortune) is a 2017 American crime thriller film directed by Lucky McKee and written by Jared Butler and Lars Norberg. The film stars John Cusack, Ellar Coltrane, Willa Fitzgerald and Jacob Artist.

Blood Money was released by Saban Films in the United States on October 13, 2017.

== Plot ==
During a weekend excursion in the woods, three friends, Victor (Ellar Coltrane), his ex-girlfriend Lynn (Willa Fitzgerald) and Jeff (Jacob Artist), who's been secretly sleeping with Lynn, discover four bags full of money. The trio discover that the bags belong to a criminal named Miller (John Cusack), who is looking for the money.

As they try to get away, Jeff is entangled with one of the bags. With Miller pulling him in one direction, and Lynn refusing to let go of the money. As a result, Jeff dies from fatal injuries inflicted during the confrontation. Near an abandoned mill, Victor falls off the trail and Lynn has hidden the money somewhere in the mill. Miller confronts Lynn when she tries to negotiate with him, saying that if he gives her some of the money, she will tell him where the rest is hidden.

Lynn distracts Miller long enough for Victor to hit him from behind with a pipe. Lynn then uses the pipe to bludgeon Miller to death. In the heat of the moment, Lynn suddenly arms herself with Miller's firearm and shoots Victor, killing him. With Lynn the only survivor, she walks out of the mill, taking the money back with her to civilization.

== Cast ==
- John Cusack as Miller
- Ellar Coltrane as Victor, Lynn’s ex-boyfriend and Jeff’s friend
- Willa Fitzgerald as Lynn, Victor’s ex-girlfriend
- Jacob Artist as Jeff, Victor’s friend
- Ned Bellamy as Ranger
- Johanna McGinley as Drunk Girl

== Release ==
Blood Money was released in theaters and on digital HD and video on demand by Saban Films on October 14, 2017.

=== Critical reception ===
On Rotten Tomatoes, the film has an approval rating of 57%, based on 7 reviews, with an average rating of 3.6/10. On Metacritic, the film has a weighted average score of 42 out of 100, based on 6 critics, indicating "mixed or average" reviews.

James Berardinelli of ReelViews rated the film 2.5 out of 4 stars, saying: "Director Lucky McKee and screenwriters Jared Butler and Lars Norberg take a standard premise and tweak it sufficiently to make it interesting and, at times, even darkly humorous."
