= Lorelei Linklater =

American actress (born 1993)

- Born: Lorelei Grace Linklater; May 29, 1994 (age 32); San Miguel de Allende, Guanajuato, Mexico
- Years active: 2001–present
- Father: Richard Linklater

Lorelei Grace Linklater (born May 29, 1994) is an American actress and multimedia artist. She is the oldest daughter of director Richard Linklater and Christina Harrison.

== Acting ==
Linklater appears in films Waking Life and Boyhood (both directed by her father), in the latter playing the older sister to Ellar Coltrane's Mason.

== Filmography ==
=== Film ===
Year	Film	Role	Notes
2001	Waking Life	Girl Playing Paper Card Game	
2007	The Substitute	Jane	Short film
2014	Boyhood	Samantha Evans	
2016	Occupy, Texas	Claire	
2017	Bomb City	Rome	
2017	Woodshock	Jenny	Scenes cut
2017	Blood Surf	Nic	
2017	When We Burn Out	Kelly	
2018	We the Coyotes	Katie	
2019	Christmas Cars	Dani	
2019	After the Night With Valerie	Valerie	
2020	Buck Alamo	Caroline	
2020	Javelina Run	Horsefeathers	Short film
2021	Autumn Road	Laura	
2022	The Squad: Rise of the Chicano Squad	Sandy	
2022	Old Man Jackson	Dr. Jane MgGregor	
2023	Amityville Bigfoot	Casey	
2023	Woods Witch	Lucia	
2024	Desert Fiends	Dawn	In post-production
TBA	American Trash	Melissa	In post-production

=== Television ===
Year	Title	Role	Notes
2021	"Recast"	Fabi	

=== Music video ===
Year	Artist	Song	Role	Notes
2018	River Jones	"The End of Days"		
2019	The Bright Light Social Hour	"Lie to Me"		

== Accolades ==
Year	Title	Award	Result
2014	Boyhood	Screen Actors Guild Award for Outstanding Performance by a Cast in a Motion Picture	Nominated
2014	Boyhood	Georgia Film Critics Association Award for Best Ensemble	Won
2014	Boyhood	Boston Society of Film Critics Award for Best Cast	Won
2014	Boyhood	Critics' Choice Movie Award for Best Acting Ensemble	Nominated
2014	Boyhood	Women Film Critics Circle Award for Best Young Actress	Nominated
2014	Boyhood	Washington D.C. Area Film Critics Association Award for Best Ensemble	Nominated
2014	Boyhood	San Diego Film Critics Society Award for Best Ensemble	Nominated
2014	Boyhood	Florida Film Critics Circle Award for Best Cast	Nominated
2014	Boyhood	Detroit Film Critics Society for Best Ensemble	Nominated
2022	After the Night with Valerie	Casablanca Film Factory Awards for Best Actress	Won
