= Danielle Lessovitz =

American film director, producer and screenwriter

- Born: San Francisco, California, United States
- Occupation(s): Director, producer, screenwriter
- Known for: Port Authority (2019)

Danielle Lessovitz is an American film director, producer, and screenwriter. She began her career in 2008, releasing several short films before her feature directorial debut Port Authority, which premiered at the 2019 Cannes Film Festival's Un Certain Regard section. She has screened her films at more than 100 film festivals worldwide. She typically casts non-actors in her films, and focuses on marginalized communities.

== Early life and education ==
Lessovitz was born in San Francisco. She grew up in Kansas City during the 1990s, but is currently based in New York City.

She identifies as a queer woman. Lessovitz uses female pronouns and sees herself as "quite genderless", explaining: "gender [is] a sort of weird thing for me, because I don't necessarily feel one way or another". Living in Kansas City, Lessovitz was surrounded by a largely evangelical community, in which she experienced a lot of shame for being queer.

After finishing her studies at Northwestern, she travelled across the US and internationally before ending up in New York City. While in New York, she received a Master of Fine Arts in Film Directing from New York University Tisch School of the Arts, where she was awarded a fellowship for her studies and taught by, among others, Ira Sachs. She currently works as a professor of filmmaking at Rutgers University.

== Career ==
In 2012, Lessovitz made the short The Earthquake, written in 2010 after reading about Haitian communities in Queens experiencing loss from afar after the 2010 Haiti earthquake. The film is set in Brooklyn and depicts a pregnant Haitian refugee as she worries about the health of her baby. It was screened at the 30th annual Torino Film Festival. From this film, Lessovitz was honored with a New Filmmaker Award from the Philadelphia Jewish Film Society, Best Hartland short at the Kansas City Film Festival, and the Ben Lazeroff Award for screenwriting.

Lessovitz's first project to participate at the Cannes Film Festival was the dramatic film Mobile Homes (2017), directed by Vladamir de Fontenay. She co-executive produced the film with Charles de Rosen and worked as an artistic collaborator with de Fontenay in the writing process. Eric Kohn for IndieWire said that for the film, Lessovitz "burrows inside a persecuted world without pandering to it".

=== Port Authority (2019) ===
Her feature film directing debut was made with Port Authority (2019), which premiered at the Cannes Film Festival's Un Certain Regard section. The film is set in the New York ball subculture and tells the love story of Wye (Leyna Bloom), a black transgender woman, and Paul (Fionn Whitehead), a homeless white man. The films premiere marked an important moment in Cannes history, as Leyna Bloom became the first black trans actress to star as lead in a film at the festival.

The film was executive produced by Martin Scorsese, who Lessovitz said she was scared to reveal the final product to, explaining that "to feel like you have one of the most if not the most important American auteurs opening up his wisdom and his mentorship to you is surreal".

Taylor B. Hinds for I AM FILM wrote that Lessovitz "displaces the ... white-male role to the outskirts of the queer culture" in the film, also forcing Whitehead's character Paul to rediscover his sexuality and masculinity while engulfed in the ball scene. Lessovitz has said that she knew of ball culture from having seen Paris Is Burning as a film student, but did not know that it was still around in the 2010s until she was invited to one while in a crisis after her father's suicide; watching people vogueing gave her "respite" in this time, and speaking to drag families helped her gain a fresh understanding of family structures. The character of Paul has several parallels with Lessovitz, but she explains that his male privilege is explored in the film, something she has never experienced.

The film also confronts Paul's identity as a white person, something that IndieWire's Jude Dry said Lessovitz "clearly gave a lot of thought"; interviewed by the outlet from Cannes, she said:

We need to have conversations, especially as white allies ... How do we tell these stories that are important to us and relevant to us? How do we do it in a way that's consistent with the deeper humanity that runs through all of us? And we need to have a middle ground where we're not working in a space that's commercial or fetishistic and sort of wanting to exploit or profit off of the beautiful cultural contributions of a class of marginalized people.

Kohn said that Lessovitz's "ability to address the drama's specific hook in measured terms enables this scrappy little movie to strike a quietly progressive note".

== Filmography ==
Film
Year	Title	Director	Writer	Producer	Notes
2008	Repetitive Acts	Yes	Yes	Yes	Short
2008	The Fish	Yes	Yes	Yes	Short
2009	Batteries	Yes	Yes	Yes	Short
2012	The Earthquake	Yes	Yes	Co-producer	Short
2013	Neon Heartache	Yes	Yes	Yes	Short
2013	The Anatomy of Injury	Yes	Yes	No	Short
2014	Juan Doffo	Yes	Yes	No	Short
2015	LP	No	Yes	No	Short
2017	Mobile Homes	No	Co-writer	Co-producer	
2019	Port Authority	Yes	Yes	No	Feature directorial debut
