= Patti Cakes =

2017 film

- Theatrical release poster
- Directed by: Geremy Jasper
- Written by: Geremy Jasper
- Produced by: Chris Columbus; Michael Gottwald; Dan Janvey; Noah Stahl; Daniela Taplin Lundberg; Rodrigo Teixeira
- Starring: Danielle Macdonald; Bridget Everett; Mamoudou Athie; Cathy Moriarty; McCaul Lombardi
- Cinematography: Federico Cesca
- Edited by: Brad Turner
- Music by: Jason Binnick; Geremy Jasper
- Production companies: Department of Motion Pictures; RT Features; Stay Gold Features
- Distributed by: Fox Searchlight Pictures
- Release dates: January 23, 2017 (Sundance); August 18, 2017 (United States)
- Running time: 108 minutes
- Country: United States
- Language: English
- Budget: $1.4 million
- Box office: $1.5 million

Patti Cakes (stylized as Patti Cake$) is a 2017 American drama film directed by Geremy Jasper. It was screened in the US Dramatic Competition section of the 2017 Sundance Film Festival. It was released on August 18, 2017, by Fox Searchlight Pictures.

== Plot ==
23-year-old Patricia "Patti" Dombrowski works as a bartender and lives with her alcoholic mom Barb and ailing grandmother in small-town New Jersey. Patti, an aspiring rapper, dreams of getting signed by Oz, a local rap star. Danny, a small-time drug dealer, hands her a flyer for an upcoming rap show that he and his friends will perform at. At the rap show, Patti and her friend Jheri watch a solo performer, Basterd The Antichrist, perform a hard rock song as he gets booed offstage. Jheri pays for a recording session in Newark but Patti has a bad trip and walks out on the session. Patti takes a second job as a caterer to pay for Nana's medical treatment. Barb, who sang for a rock band in the 1980s, plays her demo track "Tough Love" for Patti and explains she could've been famous if she didn't get pregnant with Patti. When Patti shares her own dreams of fame in the music industry, Barb dismisses rap as "not real music".

While visiting her dad's grave with her grandmother, Patti spots Basterd going through a tunnel known as the Gates of Hell. Patti comes across Basterd's secret spot where he records music and beats and she calls Jheri to meet her there. Basterd is about to kick them out when they mock his rundown living space but Patti and Jheri plead with Basterd to let them record something. With Nana's vocal samples, they record "PBNJ", referring to their initials (Patti, Basterd, Nana, Jheri) as well as their home state of New Jersey. At a catering gig, Patti meets a radio host named DJ French Tips, whom Patti is a fan of. She gives French Tips her demo CD to listen to. Patti and Basterd start a romantic relationship.

Patti is called to cater at a professional event, which happens to be held at Oz's mansion. Unprompted, Patti does a surprise rap for Oz, who dismisses her appearance and calls her a "culture vulture". PBNJ's first performance is at a strip club, but Oz's criticism shakes Patti and she leaves after performing one song. Patti is fired from the catering job and she quits her bartending job. Nana passes away and Patti quits her rapping career.

Patti gets a call from DJ French Tips, telling Patti she liked what she heard from the demo CD. She tells Patti that she submitted her name for a rookie rap competition in Newark. Patti thanks French Tips, and she reconciles with Basterd and Jheri. The three go to Newark for the show, which Oz is attending. Patti performs as Barb walks in to watch her perform. To Barb's surprise, Patti's song samples "Tough Love", and Patti invites Barb to personally sing the chorus. The two embrace as the crowd cheers. Another rapper wins the competition, and Patti cheers him and the other contestants on. After the show, Patti meets with Jheri and Basterd and they listen to the radio. DJ French Tips announces their song "PBNJ" as one of the requested songs. The three cheer and embrace each other as their song plays over the radio.

== Cast ==
- Danielle Macdonald as Patti
- Bridget Everett as Barb
- Mamoudou Athie as Basterd
- Cathy Moriarty as Nana
- McCaul Lombardi as Danny
- Nick Sandow as Ray
- Patrick Brana as Slaz
- MC Lyte as DJ French Tips
- Siddharth Dhananjay as Jheri

== Release ==
Patti Cakes premiered at the Sundance Film Festival on January 23, 2017. The film received distribution offers from Lionsgate, Focus Features, Neon, Amazon Studios, The Orchard and Annapurna Pictures. However, Fox Searchlight Pictures acquired distribution rights to the film for $9.5 million, the third largest deal of the festival behind Amazon Studios' purchase of The Big Sick and Netflix's purchase of Mudbound. It was released on August 18, 2017.

== Reception ==
Patti Cakes received positive reviews from critics. On review aggregator Rotten Tomatoes, the film has an approval rating of 86% based on 171 reviews, with an average rating of 7.3/10. The site's critical consensus reads, "Patti Cake$ hits a number of predictable beats, but adds enough fresh elements -- not least Danielle MacDonald's potentially starmaking turn -- to make its underdog story work." On Metacritic, which assigns a normalized rating, the film has a score of 67 out of 100, based on 37 critics, indicating "generally favorable reviews".

New York Magazine's Vulture.com called the film a "Sundance charmer" and described it as perhaps "the most endearing surprise," of the 2017 Sundance Film Festival. USA Today reported that star of the film Danielle Macdonald was met with a standing ovation when she took the stage after the world premiere at Sundance. Macdonald has been described as the break out star of the film.

The film has been compared to Hustle & Flow and 8 Mile, which both also portray a person struggling to create a career as a rapper.
