= Port Authority (film) =

2019 film

- Official poster
- Directed by: Danielle Lessovitz
- Written by: Danielle Lessovitz
- Produced by: Rodrigo Teixeira; Virginie Lacombe; Zachary Luke Kislevitz
- Starring: Fionn Whitehead; Leyna Bloom; McCaul Lombardi; Louisa Krause
- Cinematography: Jomo Fray
- Edited by: Matthew C. Hart; Clemence Samson
- Music by: Matthew Herbert
- Production companies: RT Features; Madeleine Films; Sikelia Productions; Mubi; Rhea Films; Hercules Film Fund; MK2 Films
- Distributed by: Momentum Pictures (United States); ARP Selection (France)
- Release dates: May 18, 2019 (Cannes); September 25, 2019 (France); May 28, 2021 (United States)
- Running time: 94 minutes
- Countries: United States; France
- Language: English
- Box office: $61,744

Port Authority is a 2019 drama film written and directed by Danielle Lessovitz. It stars Fionn Whitehead, Leyna Bloom, McCaul Lombardi and Louisa Krause. Martin Scorsese serves as an executive producer under his Sikelia Productions banner. It premiered at the Cannes Film Festival in the Un Certain Regard section on May 18, 2019. It released in France on September 25, 2019, by ARP Selection, and was released in the United States on May 28, 2021, by Momentum Pictures.

== Plot ==
Paul, a 20 year old Midwesterner, arrives at the central bus station and quickly catches eyes with Wye, a 22 year old girl voguing on the sidewalk. After Paul seeks her out in secret, an intense love between them blossoms. But when Paul discovers Wye is trans, he is forced to confront his own identity and what it means to belong.

== Cast ==
- Fionn Whitehead as Paul
- Leyna Bloom as Wye
- McCaul Lombardi as Lee
- Devon Carpenter as Tekay
- Eddie Bloom as Eddie
- Louisa Krause as Sara
- Christopher Quarles as Mother McQueen
- Taliek Jeqon as Dante McQueen

== Production ==
In October 2018, it was announced Fionn Whitehead, Leyna Bloom and McCaul Lombardi had joined the cast of the film, with Danielle Lessovitz directing from a screenplay she wrote. Martin Scorsese serves as an executive producer under his Sikelia Productions banner, with Mubi serving as a producer.

The film's title Port Authority refers to the Port Authority Bus Terminal, the arrival point of Paul in the film as he seeks a better life in New York; Bloom said that this reflected her own journey from the Midwest to the station in the city at seventeen. Lessovitz also explained that the station is often a place of congregation and work for queer women of colour in New York, as well as providing a sense of the transient because of the station's primary function.

As well as being a black trans actress from the Midwest, Bloom is the leader of a Drag house.

== Release ==
The film had its world premiere at the Cannes Film Festival in the Un Certain Regard section on May 18, 2019. It was released in France on September 25, 2019, by ARP Selection. It was released in the United States on May 28, 2021, by Momentum Pictures.

== Reception ==
Port Authority holds an 84% approval rating on review aggregator website Rotten Tomatoes, based on 43 reviews, with an average of 6.5/10. The site's critical consensus reads, "Although Port Authority frustrates with its inaccurate portrayal of the culture it attempts to represent, it remains an absorbing and well-acted drama." On Metacritic, the film holds a rating of 61 out of 100, based on 13 critics, indicating "generally favorable reviews".

=== Accolades ===
Year	Awards	Category	Recipient(s)	Result	Ref.
2019	Cannes Film Festival	Un Certain Regard	Port Authority	Nominated	
2019	Cannes Film Festival	Caméra d'Or	Danielle Lessovitz	Nominated	
2019	Cannes Film Festival	Queer Palm	Port Authority	Nominated	
2022	GLAAD Media Awards	Outstanding Film – Limited Release	Port Authority	Nominated	
