= Sollers Point =

2017 drama film

- Film poster
- Directed by: Matthew Porterfield
- Written by: Matthew Porterfield
- Produced by: Eric Bannat; Alexandra Byer; Gabrielle Dumon; Jordan Mintzer; Ryan Zacarias
- Starring: McCaul Lombardi; Jim Belushi; Zazie Beetz; Tom Guiry; Marin Ireland
- Cinematography: Shabier Kirchner
- Edited by: Marc Vives
- Music by: Sebastien Pan
- Production companies: DreamAlliance Entertainment; Le Bureau
- Distributed by: Oscilloscope Laboratories
- Release dates: September 26, 2017 (San Sebastián); May 18, 2018 (United States)
- Running time: 101 minutes
- Countries: United States; France
- Language: English
- Box office: $32,608

Sollers Point is a 2017 drama film written and directed by Matthew Porterfield. It stars McCaul Lombardi, Jim Belushi, Zazie Beetz, Tom Guiry and Marin Ireland.

== Plot ==
Sollers Point tells the story of Keith (Lombardi), a twenty-four-year-old newly released from prison and living with his father (Belushi) under house arrest in Baltimore. Keith is struggling to reestablish himself, and break free of the bonds forged behind bars, within a community scarred by unemployment, neglect, and deeply entrenched segregation. His intentions are in the right place and he possesses an aggressive desire to get back on his feet, but as he taps into all his familiar resources, he finds that he may be reverting to his old ways.

== Cast ==
- McCaul Lombardi as Keith
- Jim Belushi as Carol
- Zazie Beetz as Courtney
- Tom Guiry as Aaron
- Marin Ireland as Kate
- Everleigh Brenner as Jessie
- Imani Hakim as Candace
- Wass Stevens as Wasp
- Lynn Cohen as Ladybug
- Brieyon Bell-El as Marquis
- Kazy Tauginas as Gary
- Michael Rogers as Mom
- Ashley Shelton as Kelsey
- Grace Doughty as Kelly
- Carlous Palmer as Graveyard worker
- Levi Amir Serkin-Ahmed as Baby by the pool
- James Majik as tattooed gangster

== Production ==
In May 2016, it was announced McCaul Lombardi, Jim Belushi, Marin Ireland and Jurnee Smollett-Bell joined the cast of the film, with Matthew Porterfield directing from a screenplay he wrote. Ryan Zacarias, Alexandra Byer, and Jordan Mintzer will serve as producers.

=== Filming ===
Principal photography began in August 2016, in Baltimore, Maryland.

== Release and reception ==
The film had its world premiere at the San Sebastián International Film Festival on September 26, 2017. Shortly after, Oscilloscope Laboratories acquired U.S. distribution rights. It was released theatrically on May 18, 2018.

As of August 2020, 85% of the 27 critics reviews compiled on Rotten Tomatoes are positive, with an average rating of 6.85/10. Richard Brody, reviewing the film for The New Yorker, wrote: "[Sollers Point] plunges into some of the gravest and ugliest aspects of modern American life and pulls them to the fore in a chilling intimacy . . . . Porterfield gently but unshrinkingly touches some of the most inflamed and sensitive places of American society, including the relentless strains of racism, the threat of unemployment, the contraband economy, the horrors of incarceration, the ravages of addiction, the ubiquity of gun violence. . . . In “Sollers Point,” Porterfield reaches a synthesis of his efforts, or, rather, reaches a new stage of his art—the film is endowed with a quietly turbulent and complex fusion of personal observation and candid pain, local specificity and a wide-spectrum vision of politics at large."

The film was named a Critic's Pick by the New York Times and one of the 10 Best Movies of the Year by Vanity Fair. In his Vanity Fair recap, K. Austin Collins called Sollers Point "a subtle, razor-sharp portrait of working-class Baltimore" featuring "a wide-angle, all-encompassing sense of community" and "a star-making performance" by Lombardi.

== Externals ==
- Official website
- Sollers Point at IMDb
