= Leyna Bloom =

American actress, model, dancer, and activist

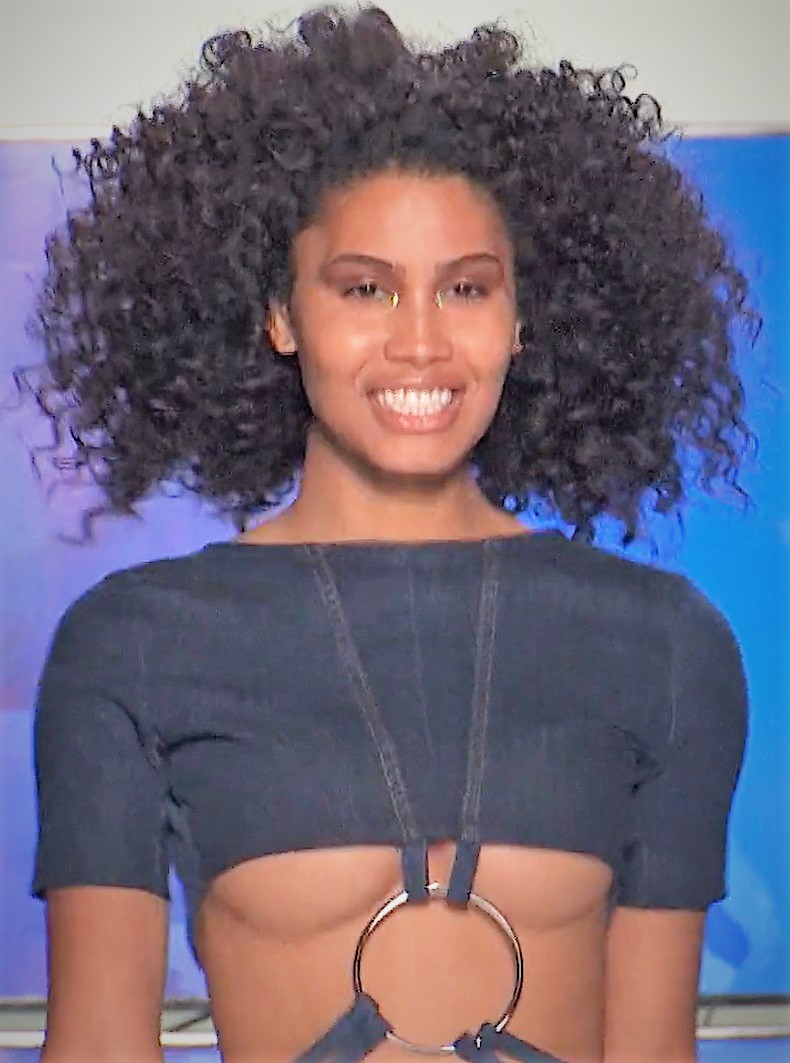
- Bloom at New York Fashion Week 2018
- Born: 1993 or 1994 (age 32–33); Chicago, IL
- Citizenship: American
- Occupation: Fashion model • dancer • actress • activist
- Modeling information
- Height: 5 ft 10 in (178 cm)
- Hair color: Brown
- Eye color: Brown

Leyna Bloom is an American actress, model, dancer, and activist. She has attracted press as a trailblazer for transgender performers in the entertainment and fashion industries.

In 2019, Bloom made her feature film acting debut in Port Authority, which premiered at the Cannes Film Festival. She has modeled for several brands and fashion designers, including Jeremy Scott, and has appeared in magazines such as Vogue India and Sports Illustrated.

== Early life ==
Bloom was born in Chicago, Illinois to a Filipina mother and an African-American father. Bloom's father later supported her decision to transition.

== Career ==
=== Acting ===
In October 2018, Deadline Hollywood announced that Bloom would star opposite Fionn Whitehead in Danielle Lessovitz's first feature film, Port Authority, which is backed by executive producer Martin Scorsese.

In 2019, Bloom made her feature film acting debut in Port Authority, directed by Danielle Lessovitz, which premiered at the Cannes Film Festival in the Un Certain Regard section, marking the first film in the festival's 72-year history to feature a trans woman of color in a leading role. Casting Director Damian Bao found Bloom at a voguing ball in Philadelphia. When she met Bao and heard what the indie film was about, she felt like the part was meant for her. “I'm not just trying to act as a trans woman in ballroom — I am a trans woman in ballroom playing a character,” she said. “It's very real and it's very raw and it means a lot to me, because I am in this moment representing the most marginalized community in the world.”

In 2021, Bloom appeared in the third and final season of the FX drama series Pose.

=== Ballroom ===
Bloom is a fixture in the queer ballroom scene as a member of the House of Miyake-Mugler and made an international name for herself competing at balls in the category of face.

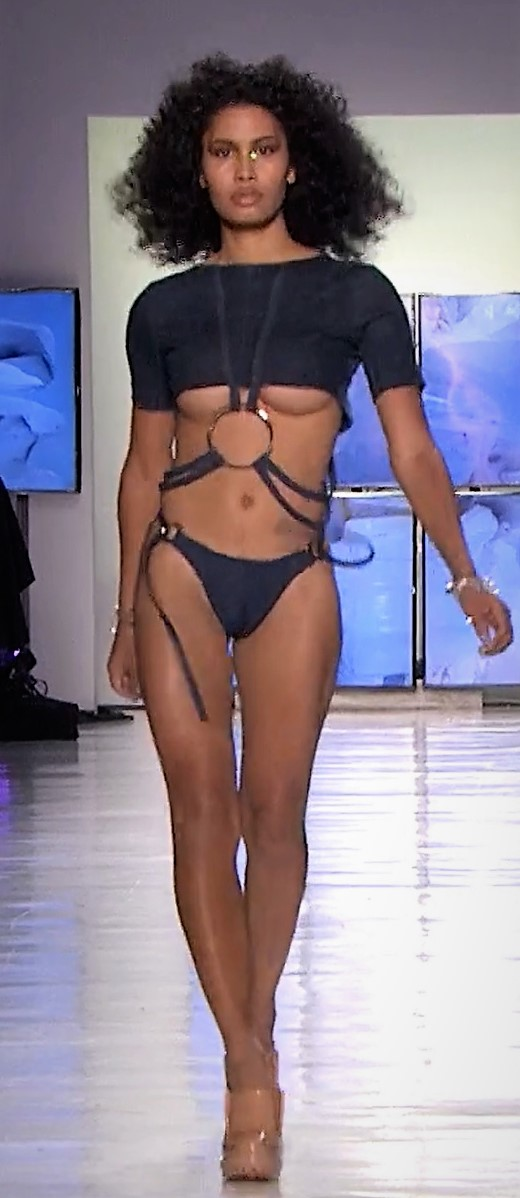
Bloom modeling the Chromat Spring-Summer 2018 Serenity Collection at New York Fashion Week

=== Modeling ===
In 2014, Bloom appeared in a C☆NDY Magazine cover feature on prominent trans women. Bloom was not open about being transgender before that photo shoot; she decided to come out as she felt liberated sharing a major magazine cover with 13 other trans women.

As one of few openly transgender models working in the industry, in September 2017, Bloom made news for walking the runway for the Chromat label during New York Fashion Week. In October 2017, Bloom became the first openly transgender woman of color to appear in Vogue India.

On April 9, 2018, she launched a viral campaign on Twitter to be cast as the first openly trans woman to walk in the Victoria's Secret Fashion Show. Because of Bloom's comments and the reactions from other models, Victoria's Secret casting direction has been criticized by professionals and fashion journalists.

Later that year, Leyna Bloom was cast as one of the faces of the H&M x Moschino by Jeremy Scott Fall/Winter 2018 international campaign shot by the legendary fashion photographer Steven Meisel. She starred in the campaign with Gigi Hadid, Stella Maxwell, Soo Joo Park, Imaan Hammam, and Yasmin Wijnaldum.

Glamour named Leyna Bloom as one of "6 Women Who Are Shaping the Future of Fashion” in the October 2018 issue.

In March 2019, Leyna Bloom was the only transgender woman of color to walk Paris Fashion Week Fall/Winter 2019 at the Tommy Hilfiger x Zendaya fashion show in an all black cast.

In March 2021, it was announced that Bloom would appear as a model in the July swimsuit issue of Sports Illustrated, making her the first openly transgender Black and Asian-American Sports Illustrated swimsuit issue model.

== See also ==
- LGBTQ culture in New York City
- List of LGBTQ people from New York City
