= Cameron Crovetti =

American actor (born 2008)

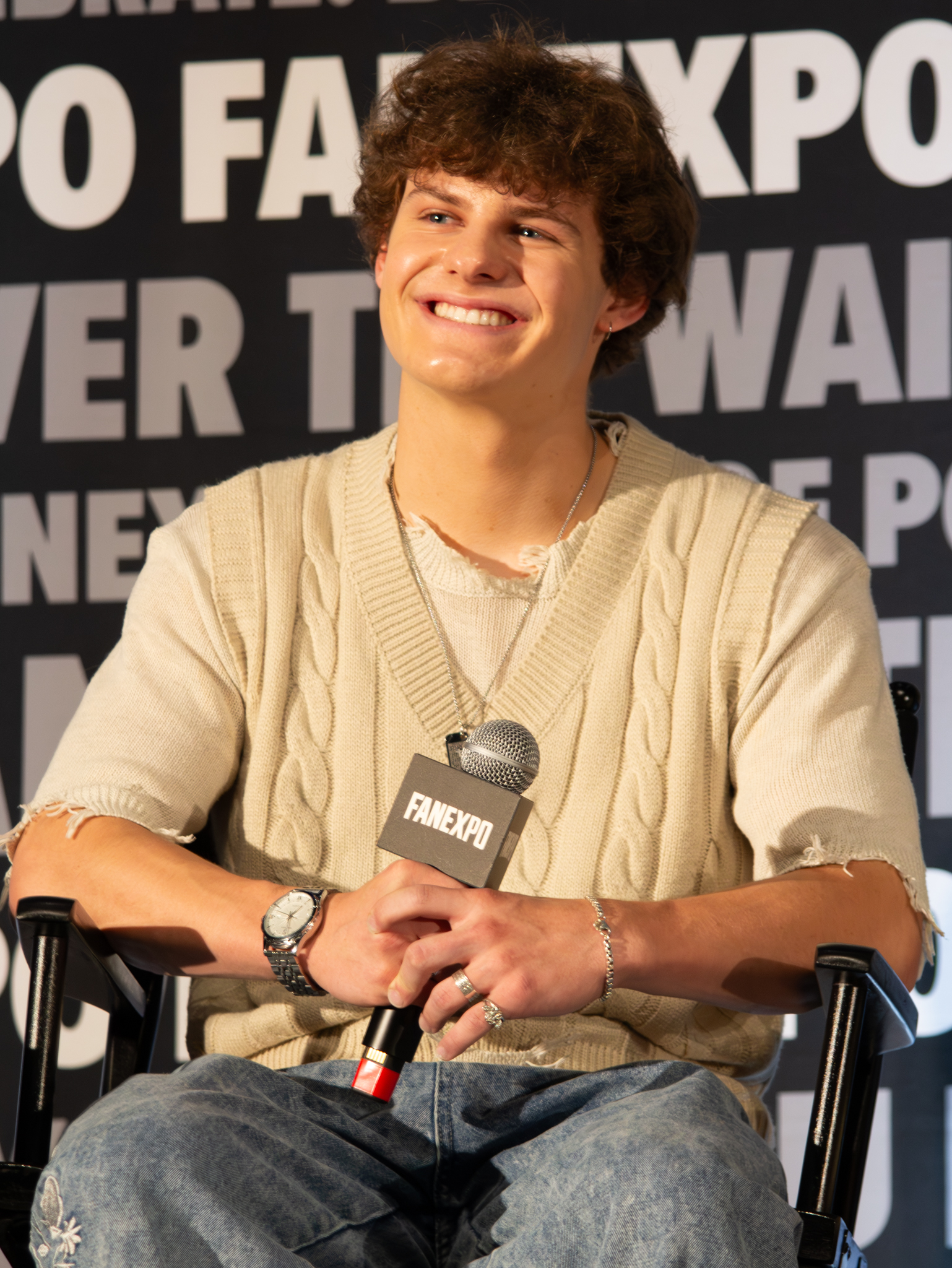
- Crovetti in 2026
- Born: March 12, 2008 (age 18); California, U.S.
- Occupation: Actor
- Years active: 2017–present
- Relatives: Isabella Crovetti (sister)

Cameron Crovetti (born March 12, 2008) is an American actor, best known for his role as Ryan Butcher in the Amazon Prime Video series The Boys (2020–2026), for which he was nominated for a Saturn Award.

== Early life ==
Crovetti was born on March 12, 2008, in California, to film producer and writer Bradley Cramp and actress Denise Crovetti. He has an elder sister, Isabella, and a twin brother Nicholas, both of whom have pursued acting careers. Prior to discovering his passion for performance, Crovetti was trained in competitive gymnastics, and he remained on the gymnastics team after he began acting. Crovetti and his brother became interested in acting after watching their sister in her first series regular role in The Neighbors on set, and they had "begged [their] mom for several years" before she allowed them to start auditioning.

== Career ==
Crovetti's early roles included Dylan#2 in the 2017 sitcom Black-ish and Tim in the 2018 French-American film Anywhere with You. He received his breakout role with the black comedy drama series Big Little Lies, in which he and his twin brother Nicholas starred as Josh and Max Wright, the sons of Nicole Kidman and Alexander Skarsgård's characters. Crovetti continued to act alongside his brother, appearing as one of the sons living with their single mother, played by Elizabeth Mitchell, in the 2021 horror film Witch Hunt. He also landed a recurring role as Ryan Broderick in the crime anthology series Dirty John, playing the son of a divorced couple, portrayed by Amanda Peet and Christian Slater, who are dealing with family turmoil.

Starting in 2020, Crovetti took on the role of Ryan Butcher, the son of superhero Homelander played by Antony Starr, in the satirical superhero series The Boys. He began as a series regular in season 2 and was later promoted to a main role in season 4. Crovetti auditioned before the show's first season aired, knowing only that his role was to play Homelander's son, and his audition tape was solely based on his own imagination of the show's tone, after which he was cast in the role about a month later. He described his character's arc as initially oscillating between choosing Homelander or Butcher as a father figure, but by the third-season finale, he is leaning more towards Homelander and the character "might not be so good" onwards. Crovetti received a nomination for Best Performance by a Younger Actor in a Television Series in the 52nd Saturn Awards for the role.

In 2022, Crovetti landed a lead role in the psychological horror film Goodnight Mommy, starring alongside his brother and Naomi Watts, and portrayed the younger version of Sierra Six, a CIA mercenary played by Ryan Gosling, in the action thriller film The Gray Man. He lent his voice to the recurring character Harry Haphazard in the animated series Firebuds since the same year. In 2023, Crovetti starred in the horror thriller film Oracle, and portrayed the younger version of Boy, the lead and titular character played by Bill Skarsgård, in the action comedy film Boy Kills World.

== Filmography ==
=== Film ===
Year	Title	Role	Notes
2018	Anywhere with You	Tim	
2021	Witch Hunt	Corey	
2022	The Gray Man	Young Sierra Six	
2022	Goodnight Mommy	Elias	
2023	Oracle	Chase	
2023	Boy Kills World	Young Boy	
TBA	Road to Recovery †	TBA	Post-production

=== Television ===
Year	Title	Role	Notes
2017	Black-ish	Dylan #2	Guest; 1 episode
2017–2019	Big Little Lies	Josh Wright	Recurring; 14 episodes
2018	Single Parent	Carol	Guest; 1 episode
2020	Dirty John	Ryan Boderick	Recurring (season 2); 6 episodes
2020–2026	The Boys	Ryan Butcher	Main (season 4–5), recurring (season 2–3); 18 episodes
2022–2023	Firebuds	Harry Haphazard	Recurring; 6 episodes

== Awards and nominations ==
Year	Award	Category	Work	Result	Ref.
2020	26th Screen Actors Guild Awards	Outstanding Performance by an Ensemble in a Drama Series	Big Little Lies	Nominated	
2025	52nd Saturn Awards	Best Performance by a Younger Actor in a Television Series	The Boys	Nominated	
