= Anywhere with You (film) =

- Directed by: Hanna Ladoul; Marco La Via
- Written by: Hanna Ladoul; Marco La Via
- Produced by: Hanna Ladoul; Marco La Via; Raphael Gindre
- Starring: Morgan Saylor; McCaul Lombardi
- Cinematography: Stephen Tringali
- Edited by: Camille Delprat
- Music by: Juan Cortes
- Production companies: Noodles; Studio Orlando; Vanishing Angle
- Release dates: May 2018 (Cannes); February 5, 2019
- Running time: 87 minutes
- Countries: United States; France
- Language: English

Anywhere with You (formerly titled We the Coyotes) is a 2018 French-American drama film written and directed by Hanna Ladoul and Marco La Via and starring Morgan Saylor and McCaul Lombardi.

== Synopsis ==
The story follows young couple Amanda and Jake's first 24 hours in Los Angeles after uprooting and driving cross-country from Illinois for Amanda's upcoming job interview with a record company. Their relationship is tested as they face financial setbacks and other struggles trying to find their footing in their new world.

== Cast ==
- Morgan Saylor as Amanda
- McCaul Lombardi as Jake
- Betsy Brandt as Jeanine
- Khleo Thomas as Danny
- Lorelei Linklater as Katie
- Cameron Crovetti as Tim
- Nicholas Crovetti as Dylan
- Vivian Bang as Jennifer
- Ravil Isyanov as Lazlo

== Release ==
The film premiered at the 2018 Cannes Film Festival and was released on February 5, 2019.

== Reception ==
Sheri Linden of The Hollywood Reporter gave the film a positive review, calling it "A valentine to the fringes, modestly proportioned and keenly observed."
