= Goodnight Mommy (2022 film) =

2022 film by Matt Sobel

- Official release poster
- Directed by: Matt Sobel
- Screenplay by: Kyle Warren
- Based on: Goodnight Mommy; Written and directed by Veronika Franz; Severin Fiala; Produced by Ulrich Seidl
- Produced by: Joshua Astrachan; David Kaplan; V.J. Guibal; Nicolas Brigaud-Robert
- Starring: Naomi Watts; Cameron Crovetti; Nicholas Crovetti; Peter Hermann; Crystal Lucas-Perry; Jeremy Bobb
- Cinematography: Alexander Dynan
- Edited by: Michael Taylor; Maya Maffioli
- Music by: Alex Weston
- Production companies: Playtime; Animal Kingdom; Big Indie Pictures
- Distributed by: Amazon Studios
- Release date: September 16, 2022
- Running time: 92 minutes
- Country: United States
- Language: English

Goodnight Mommy is a 2022 American psychological horror film directed by Matt Sobel and written by Kyle Warren. It is a remake of the 2014 Austrian film with the same name, and stars Naomi Watts, Cameron and Nicholas Crovetti, Crystal Lucas-Perry, Jeremy Bobb, and Peter Hermann. It follows twin brothers who suspect their mother was switched with an impostor.

The film was announced in early 2021, naming Sobel as director, Warren as the scriptwriter and Watts as the star. The rest of the cast were announced later and principal photography began from June to August that same year.

Goodnight Mommy was released on Prime Video by Amazon Studios on September 16, 2022. The film received mixed reviews from critics, who praised Watts' performance, but criticized its writing, pacing and deemed it "inferior" and "unnecessary" compared to the original film.

== Plot ==
Twin brothers Elias and Lukas have stayed with their father following their parents' divorce. When they return home to live with their estranged mother, a former actress, they are disturbed to find that her entire head is covered in bandages after having cosmetic surgery. The mother (who is never named) enforces some house rules which include not entering her room, or the barn. While playing in the fields, the boys cannot resist exploring the barn, where they find their old toys. Their mother catches them and decrees that from now on, they have to stay in the country house.

The boys are unsettled by their mother's behavior and apparent disinterest in reconnecting with them; she drinks heavily, has a short temper, and refuses to sing them the lullaby she sang to them when they were children. Elias also discovers that his mother has thrown away a drawing he made of the three of them. One night, Elias overhears his mother talking to an unknown person on the phone, saying she cannot go on pretending and wants him gone.

After seeing an old photograph of their mother with a different eye color, the boys begin to question whether the woman they are living with is their real mother. When they try to call their father, their mother breaks their shared cell phone. One night, while she is taking a bath, Elias tries to remove the skincare face mask she is wearing. An argument ensues. After Elias asserts that she is not actually their mother, she slaps him, then sprays him with freezing cold water until he admits he is wrong.

The boys leave in the middle of the night and try to seek help at a nearby house, only to find that it is abandoned. They break in to spend the night, but two local state troopers find them and return them home. Their mother, who has now removed her bandage, insists they are imagining things and tells the police that the injury on Elias' lip is from accidentally slipping and falling by the pool.

The next morning, the mother awakens to find herself bound to the bed with duct tape. She demands to be freed and explains that her eye color is different in the photo because she wore green contact lenses as an actress. She insists that the contacts are in her purse, but Lukas claims he searched the purse and did not find them. Elias feels apprehensive about leaving their mother trapped, but Lukas convinces him to escape. While they are waiting for a taxi, Elias pretends he forgot his toothbrush and returns to the house, where he searches his mother's purse and finds the contacts. Lukas appears and begs Elias to let him explain. Elias flees to the bedroom to free their mother while Lukas disappears.

The mother takes Elias to the barn and shows him a blood-stained bullet hole in the wall. Upon seeing it, Elias breaks down; it is revealed that Elias accidentally shot and killed Lukas, and has been hallucinating Lukas' presence this entire time. Following Lukas' death, the mother lost herself to grief, resulting in her divorce and her estrangement from Elias. The mother attempts to console Elias, but in a confused rage, he lashes out and pushes her from the barn loft; her lantern shatters and sets fire to the barn. Elias flees and tearfully watches the barn burn to the ground. Both his mother and brother Lukas appear at his side. With a smile, his mother tells him he has done nothing wrong, and they embrace.

== Cast ==
- Naomi Watts as Mother
- Cameron Crovetti as Elias
- Nicholas Crovetti as Lukas
- Peter Hermann as Father
- Crystal Lucas-Perry as Sandy
- Jeremy Bobb as Gary

== Production ==
In April 2021, Variety announced that Playtime had purchased the rights for a remake to the 2014 Austrian film, Goodnight Mommy, which was being developed with Amazon Studios and Animal Kingdom, with Matt Sobel directing, Kyle Warren writing, and Naomi Watts set to star and executive produce (alongside original writers/directors Veronika Franz and Severin Fiala). In June that same year, Cameron and Nicholas Crovetti were added to the cast including Jeremy Bobb, Crystal Lucas-Perry, and Peter Hermann.

In August 2022, it was announced that Alex Weston had composed the score for the film.

== Release ==
Goodnight Mommy was released in the United States on September 16, 2022, on Prime Video by Amazon Studios.

=== Critical reception ===
On the review aggregator website Rotten Tomatoes, 37% of 68 critics' reviews are positive, with an average rating of 5.1/10. The website's consensus reads: "Naomi Watts is as talented as ever, but this Goodnight Mommy remake has no real reason to exist." Metacritic, which uses a weighted average, assigned the film a score of 45 out of 100, based on 17 critics, indicating "mixed or average" reviews.

Benjamin Lee of The Guardian gave the film 2/5 stars, writing: "Without the fine, frightening direction of aunt-nephew duo Veronika Fran and Severin Fiala, we're left with very little, a slick but soulless little movie that should appease neither fans of the original nor newcomers." Peter Sobczynski of RogerEbert.com gave the film 1/4 stars, saying that it "replicates the basic story beats of the original but leaves out all of the tension, ambiguity, and nasty invention that made that earlier effort so effective in the first place." Murtada Elfadi of The A.V. Club wrote: "The original Austrian film had shock value and genuine, gruesome horror. This new Americanized version sands the edges off of the narrative every chance it gets", and gave it a grade of C−.

Christian Zilko of IndieWire gave the film a grade of B−, writing that it "never tries to reinvent the wheel, but while it lacks the potency of the original film, it manages to keep horror lovers entertained without ever embarrassing itself." Paul Byrnes of The Sydney Morning Herald gave the film 3/5 stars, writing: "I can't say it's better or worse than the original. It's effectively chilling, rather than terrifying. Why Sobel needed to remake it is a mystery." Noel Murray of the Los Angeles Times praised Watts's performance, but added that the film "pulls back too much from the violence and torture that made the original such a sublime ordeal."

== See also ==
- Capgras delusion
- Dissociative disorder
- Fugue state
- Self-deception
