= Oracle (film) =

2023 horror film

- Release poster
- Directed by: Daniel Di Grado
- Screenplay by: Michael A. Ross; Corey Harrell
- Story by: Corey Harrell; Jaime Primak Sullivan
- Produced by: James Lopez; Will Packer
- Starring: Ryan Destiny; Heather Graham
- Cinematography: Luca Del Puppo
- Edited by: Linda Jildmalm; Ken Blackwell
- Music by: Jermaine Stegall
- Production companies: Universal Pictures; Will Packer Productions
- Distributed by: Max
- Release date: October 1, 2023
- Running time: 85 minutes
- Country: United States
- Language: English
- Budget: $8.8 million

Oracle is a 2023 American horror thriller film directed by Daniel Di Grado from a screenplay by Michael Ross and Corey Harrell. The film stars Ryan Destiny, Ariel Martin, and Heather Graham and was released on Max on October 1, 2023.

== Plot ==
Shay, a young black woman, awakes from a troubling nightmare about a door with a red glass handle. She is a college student majoring in African-American History with emphasis on the Civil War. Money is running low with Shay and her roommate, Jasmine, but Shay gets a job offer from a woman named Kate. Kate grew up in an old plantation home nearby and has returned with her three children in tow to care for her dying mother. On her way to check out the house, Shay makes a friendly connection with her rideshare driver. Wary of the job, he gives her his card in case she needs his services again. At the house, Kate is constantly apologetic for its history but often seems falsely naive about it. She introduces Shay to the children - Andrew, Chase, and Blair - and shows her a photograph of her deceased relative who fought in the Civil War and his wife. Shay leaves with no intentions of taking the job. She begins to investigate the house's history, but can't find anything.

Shay receives a phone call in the middle of the night from Kate. She says her mother is not expected to make it through the night, and she needs to go to the hospital. Kate's husband is not able to make it in time, and she has no one else to call, so she asks Shay to come stay the night. Shay says no, but Kate offers her $500 for the night. Jasmine warns her about the house and tells her not to investigate too heavily. She calls her rideshare driver from before, and he drops her off at the house. Shay accidentally drops her keys in his backseat.

The children are in bed when she arrives. Kate warn her that the children get up often throughout the night. Shay begins to walk around, looking through the house. She hears a noise in the bathroom and sees Blair scrubbing her hands in the sink with scalding water. Blair keeps saying she's sorry and that the water is too hot. Shay stops her and asks her what she's doing. She says her mother told her to scrub all the areas where Shay had touched her. Confused and somewhat alarmed, Shay sends Blair to bed.

Shay video calls Jasmine to check in. She begins to tell her about what the incident with Blair but holds back. The image pixelates, and Shay sees herself with an iron contraption around her head. She panics and wakes from what seems to be a dream.

Shay encounters Andrew in the hallway. He tells her he's had a nightmare and shows her a drawing he's made of a hand reaching for a red glass doorknob just like the one in her dream. She sends him to bed and continues to explore. Chase meets her in the stairwell and asks where his mother is. At that time, Kate calls Shay to check in but hangs up quickly when her mother's doctor approaches.

Andrew wakes again and says he's hungry. As Shay is making him something to eat, she finds the red doorknob in a drawer. She tells him they've had the same dream, and the electricity goes out. Ghosts of slaves are running around the outside of the house, shouting, and Andrew senses the presence of the wife from the old photographs. Ghosts begin to torment them.

Blair wakes again, and Shay attempts to tuck her in. She asks about Shay's mother, who has died, and wants to know if she misses her. Shay tells her she does. Blair says that she misses her best friend. She says her mother wouldn't let her come over anymore. When Shay asks why, Blair touches Shay's arm, pointing at her skin. Blair ask Shay if she can be her new best friend, Shay says she will. Blair begins to sing “Shortnin' Bread,” and Shay tells her they shouldn't sing it because of the history of the song, but Blair doesn't understand. Rather than having to explain it to her, Shay tells her she will just clap along while Blair sings. They hear a noise on the staircase, and Blair tells her that “she is awake.“ Blair takes Shay into the closet for them to hide. She says that if she catches them, she will kill Blair. Shay thinks she's overreacting and quietly emerges from the closet only to be grabbed by her hair and dragged downstairs by an invisible force.

She hits a wall and stands to collect herself as she calls 911. The reception is poor, and they can't hear her. Shay goes back upstairs to check on the kids. The boys are hiding from Shay because Andrew thinks she's crazy and causing problems. He won't open the door to her. She hears a noise and what seems to be Blair whispering to her. Shay follows the whispers to the bathroom and is locked inside. The faucet turns on, and she sees a distorted image of herself in the mirror with the widow's ghost behind her. The widow grabs her by the back of the neck and attempts to force her face into the sink. Shay fights back and smashes the mirror with a brush, causing the widow to leave.

Jasmine calls Shay to tell her she found out something about the house. There was a slave revolt, and the widow from the picture killed everyone who tried to leave. Because the reception is poor, Jasmine can't hear Shay asking for help. Jasmine is seen headed toward the house to help her.

Chase wants to leave the closet to go find Shay, but they find they are locked inside. Shay sees the widow in the hallway and runs at her to attack her, but the ghost disappears. Shay runs downstairs and sees the door with the red glass doorknob. The door is shaking as if people are trying to escape. At this time, her rideshare driver who found her keys in the backseat has shown back up the house to return them. She tries to let him in but is distracted when she sees the widow approaching her from across the room. Shay sees a ghost outside. The rideshare driver finds a broken window and approaches Shay, but a piece of glass falls, impaling him, and he dies.

Shay finds Blair hiding under a bed and joins her. Blair tells her she must stay hidden or the woman will hear her. From beneath the bed, they see the woman come into the room. Blair gets scared and runs away, the widow chasing after her. Shay runs after them both and sees that they have gone into the room with the red doorknob. At the same time, the closet the boys were locked in is opened.

Jasmine arrives at the house. Shay finds the boys in the hallway, but Chase locks himself into a closet and tells her to leave him alone. She takes Andrew into a room for them to hide. He tells her that the same thing happens every night, and Shay realizes they are in a loop. However, the ghost has been angrier since she arrived.

Jasmine finds an open door and sneaks into the house. She finds Shay and Andrew. The ghost of the widow appears before Jasmine, and Shay tries to scare her away with a weapon she's found. The ghost disappears and Jasmine is accidentally stabbed by Shay. Andrew has gone into the room with the red doorknob. Shay attempts to leave with Jasmine who is severely wounded, but the house won't let her, and the two are separated. Chase only sees that she has stabbed her friend, and he is frightened. He also runs into the room with the red doorknob.

Shay approaches the door and opens it. She turns on a light. She sees the two boys inside and has visions of slaves chained up inside. Shay asks where Blair is, but Chase warns her to stay back. Kate calls, and Shay tries to explain things to her. Kate is concerned. Shay keeps telling her that her daughter is missing. Kate reveals that she doesn't have a daughter, and Shay sees Blair in the corner of the room with a bloody wound on her back. Blair warns Shay that the slaves and her mother will come for her. Shay learns that Blair is the widow's daughter. Her best friend, Abigail, was a slave, and Blair, who is now a ghost, thinks that Shay is Abigail. Shay takes Blair's hand and says that they have to leave together. The widow appears, and tells Shay that she cannot have Blair. Blair was accidentally killed by her mother who was attempting to kill Abigail to stop her from leaving. The widow grabs Shay by the neck and attempts to keep her from leaving, but the ghosts of the slaves pull her back inside the house, and Shay is able to escape.

Shay checks on Jasmine who is in pain but seems to be doing okay. She looks into the cornfield near the house and sees that Abigail and Blair have been reunited. Kate arrives and greets her boys as Shay tends to Jasmine. The sun rises behind the house.

== Cast ==
- Ryan Destiny as Shay
- Heather Graham as Kate Simmons
- Ariel Martin as Jasmine
- Samuel Isaiah Hunter as Patrick
- Lucy Faust as the Ghost Widow
- Cameron Crovetti as Chase
- Nicholas Crovetti as Andrew
- Olive Elise Abercrombie as Blair
- Alyse Lewis as Abigail

== Production ==
=== Development ===
On November 9, 2020, it was announced that Ryan Destiny and Heather Graham would star in Oracle, a psychological horror film directed by Daniel di Grado.

=== Filming ===
Principal photography began on November 12, 2020, and concluded on December 22, 2020, in New Orleans, Louisiana.

== Release ==
The film was released on October 1, 2023, on Max.
