= Boyhood (2014 film) =

2014 film directed by Richard Linklater

- Theatrical release poster
- Directed by: Richard Linklater
- Written by: Richard Linklater
- Produced by: Richard Linklater; Cathleen Sutherland; Jonathan Sehring; John Sloss
- Starring: Patricia Arquette; Ellar Coltrane; Lorelei Linklater; Ethan Hawke
- Cinematography: Lee Daniel; Shane Kelly
- Edited by: Sandra Adair
- Production companies: IFC Productions; Detour Filmproduction; Cinetic Media
- Distributed by: IFC Films (United States); Universal Pictures (International) (Note: excludes Canada (Mongrel Media), France (Diaphana Distribution), and the Benelux (Lumière))
- Release dates: January 19, 2014 (Sundance); July 11, 2014 (United States)
- Running time: 165 minutes
- Country: United States
- Language: English
- Budget: $4 million
- Box office: $57.3 million

Boyhood is a 2014 American epic coming-of-age drama film written and directed by Richard Linklater, and starring Patricia Arquette, Ellar Coltrane, Lorelei Linklater, and Ethan Hawke. Filmed over a 12-year period, Boyhood depicts the childhood and adolescence of Mason Evans Jr. (Coltrane) from ages six to eighteen as he grows up in Texas with divorced parents (Arquette and Hawke). Richard Linklater's daughter Lorelei plays Mason's sister, Samantha.

Production began in 2002 and concluded in 2014. The project started without a completed script, with only basic plot points and the ending written initially. Linklater developed the script throughout production, writing the next year's portion of the film after rewatching the previous year's footage. He incorporated changes he saw in each actor into the script, allowing all major actors to participate in the writing process by incorporating their life experiences into their characters' stories.

Boyhood premiered at the 2014 Sundance Film Festival and was released theatrically by IFC Films on July 11, 2014 in the United States, with Universal Pictures releasing in other territories. The film competed in the main competition section of the 64th Berlin International Film Festival, where Linklater won the Silver Bear for Best Director. It received universal acclaim for its performances, Linklater's screenplay and direction, and subject matter. It was also nominated for five Golden Globe Awards, winning Best Motion Picture – Drama, Best Director, and Best Supporting Actress for Arquette; five BAFTA awards, winning for Best Director and Best Film; and six Academy Awards (including Best Picture and Best Director), winning Best Supporting Actress for Arquette. Since its release, it is widely regarded as one of the greatest films ever made. On Metacritic, it is the most recent film to have a score of 100 out of 100 and is the best-reviewed film released in the 21st century thus far.

== Plot ==
In 2002, 6-year-old Mason Evans lives with his divorced mother, Olivia, and 8-year-old sister, Samantha, in a small town in Texas. Mason overhears Olivia arguing with her boyfriend, saying she has no free time due to parenting.

In 2003, Olivia and the children move to Houston so she can attend the University of Houston to get a better job.

In 2004, Mason's father, Mason Sr., visits Houston and takes Mason and Samantha bowling. When he drops the children off at home, he argues with Olivia while the kids watch from a window. Olivia takes Mason to one of her classes, and introduces him to her professor, Bill Welbrock; Mason sees them flirt.

In 2005, Olivia and Bill have married and blended their two families. They share experiences such as playing video games and attending a midnight release of Harry Potter and the Half-Blood Prince. Mason and Samantha are enrolled in the same school as their step-siblings, Mindy and Randy. There, Mason befriends Nicole, who has a crush on him.

In 2006, Mason and Samantha bond with their father as he takes them out for a day in Houston, culminating in a Houston Astros game and a sleepover at his house. Olivia continues her education and is initially supportive of Bill's strict parenting style, which includes many chores for the children and an enforced shaving of Mason's long hair.

In 2007, Bill gradually becomes abusive and violent towards Olivia and the children due to his alcoholism. After he assaults Olivia, she moves out with Mason and Samantha to a friend's house and files for divorce. Her step children stay with their father, since Olivia is unable to locate their biological mother.

In 2008, when Mason Sr. learns that Samantha has a boyfriend, he talks to her and Mason about contraception. He also has them assist him in volunteering for Barack Obama's presidential campaign, to mixed results from the suburban Texas residents. Then on a camping trip with his son, they connect through music, film, and Mason's blossoming interest in girls. The teens have grown into their lives in San Marcos, a town close to Austin.

In 2009, Mason is bullied at school and playfully teased on a camping trip, but starts receiving attention from girls. Olivia takes a position teaching psychology at college and moves in with Jim, a student and Iraq War veteran.

In 2010, Mason is now in high school and experiments with marijuana and alcohol. Mason Sr., who has remarried and has a baby, has become more religious and takes his kids to visit his wife's parents. For Mason's 15th birthday, Mason Sr. gives him a suit and CDs; Mason's step-grandparents give him a Bible and a shotgun.

In 2011, Mason is lectured by his photography teacher, who sees his potential but is disappointed by his lack of ambition. He later attends a party and meets Sheena, who becomes his girlfriend. After Mason arrives home late one night from a party, a drunk Jim confronts him about his late hours and effeminate style. Olivia and Jim subsequently break up, and the family's financial situation worsens.

In 2012, Mason has his own truck, works part-time as a busser, and is slated for a promotion as a fry cook. Mason and Sheena visit Samantha, who is attending the University of Texas at Austin, where they share their hopes and fears about college. They have sex, and Samantha's roommate discovers them asleep together in her dorm bed.

In 2013, (Note: Mason would have had to have graduated in 2014 for the story to work out time-wise. The kids were putting up Obama signs in Fall 2008. In Fall 2009, references were made to Mason being in 8th grade, while their mom was inviting her students over to a pre-Thanksgiving party. That leads to him starting high school (9th grade) in Fall 2010 and finishing 12th grade in Spring 2014 (there is no indication that he graduated early).) towards the end of Mason's senior year in high school, he has a painful breakup with Sheena, wins the second-place silver medal in a state photography contest, and is awarded college scholarship money. His family throws him a graduation party and toasts his success. Mason Sr. gives him advice about his breakup. Planning to sell the house and downsize, Olivia meets Samantha and Mason for lunch and asks them to sort through their possessions. Later that year, as Mason prepares to leave for college, Olivia breaks down, disillusioned by how quickly life has passed. At Sul Ross State University in Alpine, Mason moves into his dorm and meets his new roommate Dalton, Dalton's girlfriend Barb, and Barb's roommate, Nicole. Mason is given an edible by Barb, and the group goes hiking at Big Bend Ranch State Park. Nicole shares with Mason her belief that, rather than people seizing moments, moments seize people; Mason agrees.

== Cast ==
- Ellar Coltrane as Mason Evans Jr.
- Patricia Arquette as Olivia Evans
- Ethan Hawke as Mason Evans Sr.
- Lorelei Linklater as Samantha Evans
- Libby Villari as Catherine
- Marco Perella as Bill Welbrock
- Brad Hawkins as Jim
- Jamie Howard as Mindy Welbrock
- Andrew Villarreal as Randy Welbrock
- Jenni Tooley as Annie
- Richard Andrew Jones as Annie's father
- Karen Jones as Annie's mother
- Bill Wise as Steve Evans
- Zoe Graham as Sheena
- Charlie Sexton as Jimmy
- Barbara Chisholm as Carol
- Cassidy Johnson as Abby
- Richard Robichaux as Mason's boss
- Steven Chester Prince as Ted
- Tom McTigue as Mr. Turlington
- Roland Ruiz as Enrique
- Will Harris as Sam's boyfriend at college
- Andrea Chen as Sam's college roommate
- Maximillian McNamara as Dalton
- Taylor Weaver as Barb, Dalton's girlfriend
- Jessi Mechler as Nicole
- Nick Krause as Charlie
- Savannah Welch as Olivia's student

== Production ==
=== Development ===
In May 2002, Richard Linklater said that he would begin shooting an untitled film in his home city of Houston that summer. He planned to assemble the cast and crew for a few weeks' filming annually for 12 years. He said: "I've long wanted to tell the story of a parent–child relationship that follows a boy from the first through the 12th grade and ends with him going off to college. But the dilemma is that kids change so much that it is impossible to cover that much ground. And I am totally ready to adapt the story to whatever he is going through."

The origin of Boyhood was me being frustrated with what I felt was the limited canvas of making a film about a kid. Most of the great childhood movies are really about a specific moment, a specific summer, a specific three days. I was interested in the growing up part — all of it. I was thinking more like a novelist. I wanted to bite off a much bigger chunk of development, and you can’t really do that on film unless you skip a lot of years and cast someone else.

IFC, the film's distributor, committed to a film budget of US$200,000 per year, or $2.4 million over the 12-year shooting period. According to Linklater, Jonathan Sehring of IFC would tell him "You’re our only production. We’re in production on one film. Better be good."

=== Casting ===
After an open casting call with several call backs, Linklater hired the six-year-old Ellar Coltrane to play the boy. The cast could not sign contracts for the film due to the De Havilland Law, which makes it illegal to contract someone for more than seven years of work. Linklater told Ethan Hawke that he would have to finish the film if Linklater died.

=== Filming and writing ===
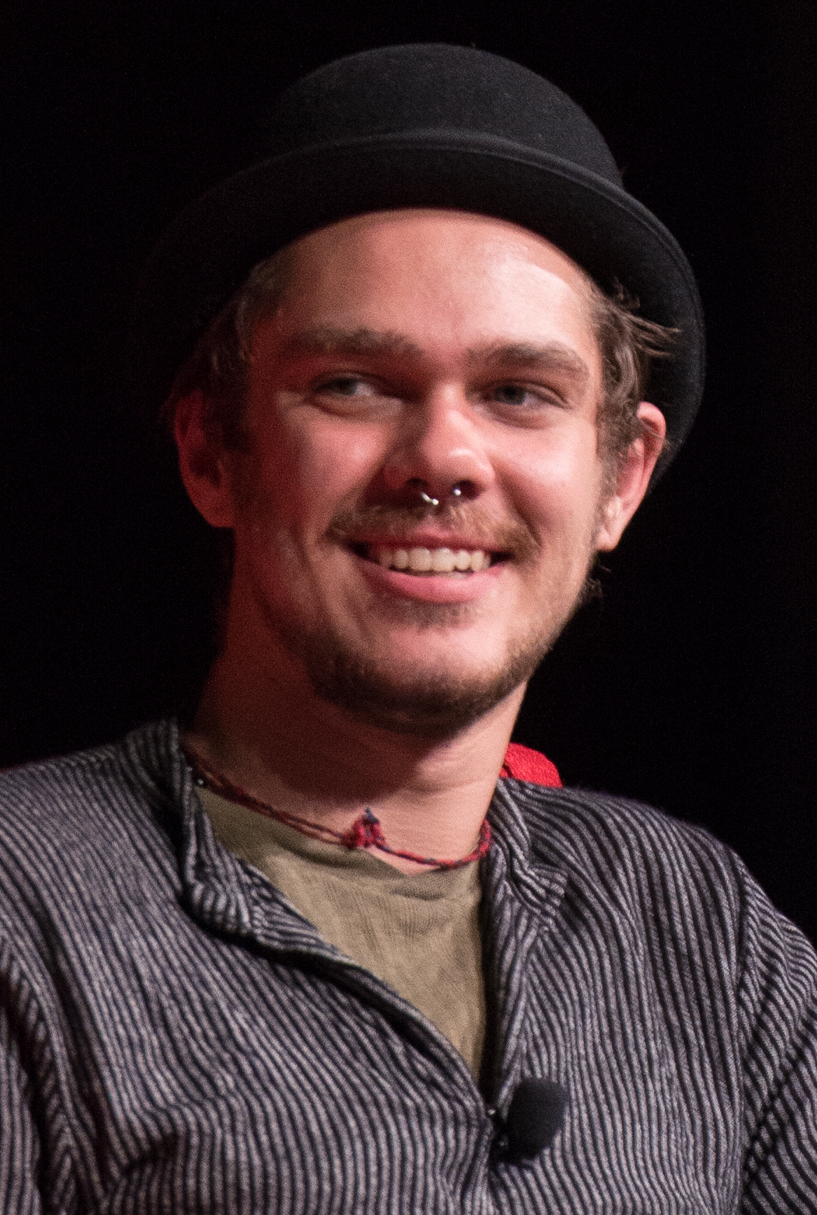
Ellar Coltrane portrayed the film's protagonist, Mason Jr.

Boyhood began filming without a completed script. Linklater had prepared each character's basic plot points, and the ending—including the final shot—but otherwise wrote the script for the next year's filming after rewatching the previous year's footage, incorporating the changes he saw in each actor. All major actors participated in the writing process, contributing their life experiences; for example, Hawke's character is based on his and Linklater's fathers—both Texan insurance agents who divorced and remarried—and Arquette's character is based on her mother, who resumed her education later in life and became a psychotherapist.

Despite the unconventional screenwriting process, Linklater stated that he had a general storyline in mind, and that the actors did not change the general direction of the story:

People think I asked Ellar, "What did you do in school the other day? Let's make a scene about that!" That never happened. The time we spent together was me just gauging where he was at in his life—what his concerns were and what he was doing. Then I would think, maybe we could move the camping trip up, and we can do this or that.

Scripts for certain scenes were sometimes finished the night prior to shooting. According to Hawke, the discussion about the possibility of additional Star Wars films is "the only honest-to-god improvised moment in the movie". The cast and crew gathered once or twice each year, on varying dates, to film for three or four days. The production team spent approximately two months in pre-production, and one month in post-production each year.

Hawke said in 2013:

It's Tolstoy-esque in scope. I thought Before Sunrise was the most unique thing I would ever be a part of, but Rick has engaged me in something even more strange. Doing a scene with a young boy at the age of seven when he talks about why do raccoons die, and at the age of 12 when he talks about video games, and 17 when he asks me about girls, and have it be the same actor—to watch his voice and body morph—it's a little bit like time-lapse photography of a human being.

Although Linklater had referred to the project as Boyhood during the early years of production, in 2013 he settled on the title 12 Years, but was forced to rename it due to the release of 12 Years a Slave the year prior. In consideration of the possibility that the actors' circumstances or availability might change over the extended period of production, Linklater had also observed that the film potentially could also have been named Motherhood, Fatherhood, etc. Hawke was amazed that the producers "still had their job" at the film's completion, despite "(having) to hide a couple hundred thousand dollars a year for over a decade while we slowly made this movie". Despite the risks, Linklater was allowed an unusual level of freedom with the production, never having to show IFC the work as it progressed.

Costume designer Kari Perkins had to review each year's footage to ensure there were no accidental repetitions and to create a "flow" to the costumes.

When discussing shooting format in an interview, Linklater discussed how insistent he was on shooting 35 mm film:

We very intentionally shot in the same way throughout, just to get a unified look. 35mm negative is about the most stable thing you could shoot on. We kinda had that from the beginning. I remember it not even being a question. You know the HD formats, I didn't really like them very much at all. I'm just not warming up to them. But they change a lot. The film would have six different looks if we tried to keep up.

=== Distribution ===
IFC Films held domestic rights to the film, with Mongrel Media distributing the film in Canada. Universal Pictures acquired international distribution of the film in all other countries except for France and the Benelux. This film was part of Peter Kujawski's efforts to distribute Kathryn Bigelow's Zero Dark Thirty and Martin Scorsese's The Wolf of Wall Street outside the United States.

== Reception ==
=== Box office ===
Boyhood premiered theatrically on July 11, 2014, in a limited release in four theaters in North America and grossed $387,618, with an average of $77,524 per theater, ranking number 19 at the box office. The film expanded the next week to 34 theaters and grossed $1.2 million, with an average of $34,418 per theater. The film's wide release occurred on August 15, opening in 771 theaters and grossing $2 million, with an average of $2,584 per theater and ranking number 11. The film's widest release in the U.S. was 775 theaters. The film ultimately earned $25.4 million domestically and $32 million internationally for a total of $57.3 million, against a $4 million production budget.

=== Critical reception ===
Boyhood has an approval rating of 97% based on 335 professional reviews on the review aggregator website Rotten Tomatoes, with an average rating of 9.2/10. Its critical consensus reads: "Epic in technical scale but breathlessly intimate in narrative scope, Boyhood is a sprawling investigation of the human condition." Metacritic (which uses a weighted average) assigned Boyhood a score of 100 out of 100 based on 50 critics, indicating "universal acclaim". It is the highest rated of all films reviewed upon their original release on the site, and one of only fourteen films in the site's history to achieve a perfect aggregate score. It also holds the highest number of reviews for a film with a score of 100.

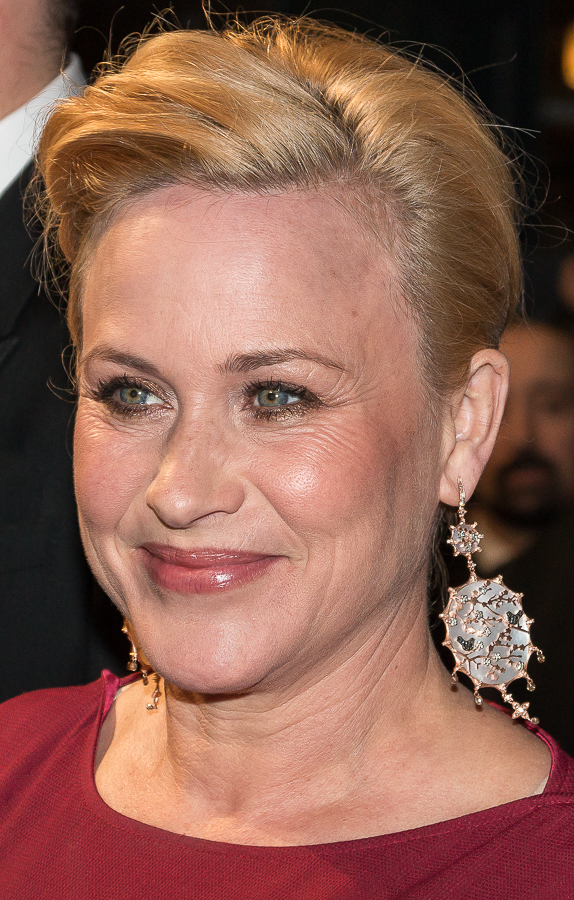
Patricia Arquette won Academy, BAFTA, Critics' Choice, Golden Globe, and SAG awards for her performance in the film.

A collection of 25 French critiques on AlloCiné, including those from Le Monde and Cahiers du cinéma, indicates wide approval, with an average score of 4.0 out of 5.

In her review for The New York Times, Manohla Dargis stated that the film's realism was "jolting" and "so brilliantly realized and understated that it would be easy to overlook". A. O. Scott, also writing for The New York Times, called Boyhood the best film of 2014, saying that he could not think of any film that had affected him the way Boyhood had in his 15 years as a professional film critic. Peter Travers of Rolling Stone also named Boyhood the best movie of the year, calling it the year's "biggest emotional powerhouse". Peter Bradshaw of The Guardian called it "one of the greatest films of the decade". Richard Roeper gave the film an A+, calling it one of the greatest films he had ever seen. Wai Chee Dimock, writing in the Los Angeles Review of Books, compared Linklater's film with Nobel laureate J. M. Coetzee's memoir, Boyhood: Scenes from Provincial Life.

Many critics singled out Patricia Arquette and Ethan Hawke's performances for praise. Mick LaSalle of the San Francisco Chronicle said that watching Arquette was "like watching a generation's hopes and struggles, presented by an actress with a fullness of emotion, and yet with utter matter-of-factness". Michael Phillips, writing for the Chicago Tribune, lauded Arquette's "lack of pretense or affectation as a performer". Dana Stevens of Slate called Hawke's performance "Superb". Indiewire, while ranking Ethan Hawke's best performances, felt that "Ethan swerves away from that easy route and instead digs down deep to create this portrait of a man who's flawed but committed to growing, or at the very least doing the best he can today and hoping he'll be able to do so again tomorrow".

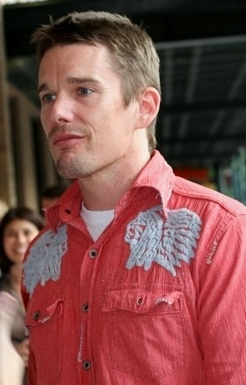
Ethan Hawke received his fourth Academy Award nomination for his performance.

Boyhood also earned the admiration of other filmmakers and artists. Director Christopher Nolan named Boyhood as his favorite film of 2014, calling it "extraordinary". U.S. President Barack Obama also named Boyhood as his favorite film of 2014. Writer-director Mike Leigh, while accepting a fellowship from the British Academy of Film and Television Arts in 2015, called it "the definitive independent film". Writer Joyce Carol Oates tweeted her support, saying: "It is rare that a film so mimics the rhythms and texture of actual life as Boyhood. Such seeming spontaneity is a very high art." Poet and critic Dan Chiasson wrote in a contribution to The New York Review of Books: "This is a great film, the greatest American movie I have ever seen in a theater. It is great for what we see, but it is even greater for its way of making real what we cannot see, or for suggesting that what we cannot yet see we might one day see." According to Canadian philosopher Howard Adelman, "[Boyhood] is Huckleberry Finn for the twenty-first century, for it is only Mason Jr. who retains his honesty, integrity and sense of decency throughout ... a masterful movie not to be missed." Alejandro González Iñárritu, winner of the Academy Award for Best Director in 2015 and Linklater's fellow nominee, said that when he watched Boyhood, he sent an email to Linklater and thanked him for giving "this incredible gift".

Other critics reacted less positively to the film. Los Angeles Times critic Kenneth Turan described it as "at best, OK" and one whose "animating idea is more interesting than its actual satisfactions". Sam Adams of IndieWire argued that the unanimous praise for Boyhood is bad for film criticism, as it tends to marginalize the analysis of critics who disagree with the majority; Adams further elaborated that masterpieces are not made "by unanimous praise, but by careful scrutiny". Richard Brody of The New Yorker listed the film at the top of a year-end list he called "The Negative Ten", a list of films with "significant merit", but that also "occluded the view toward the year's most accomplished and daringly original work".

Several reviewers questioned the film's underlying racial assumptions. Writing for The Atlantic, Imran Siddiquee noted: "While Linklater and the character of Mason can choose not to see it, dialogue about race is happening all around them and affecting their lives and experiences." Siddiquee also took issue with the apparent absence of non-white characters, particularly Latinos: "In this tale of a white family living in a state that borders Mexico, isn't it strange that the only time they're shown truly interacting with a Spanish-speaking non-white individual is when they are saving them from a life of manual labor?" Teo Bugbee of The Daily Beast asserted: "As a treatise on the essential vacuity of the white liberal male, Boyhood is a staggering achievement. As a portrait of childhood in America, it is incomplete enough to be irresponsible." Jaime Woo, of The Daily Dot, took issue with critics who identified the film as a portrait of "normal" Americans, asking: "More than one reviewer noted how impressive it was to capture these 'ordinary' Americans: In fact, Salon's Andrew O'Hehir used the word three times in his review. So what does it mean when 'ordinary' in 2014 still passes as the white experience? When the questionable treatment of ethnic minorities as props for the white characters nary raises a flag?"

=== Year-end lists ===
The international film magazine Sight & Sound named it the best film of 2014 after polling an international group of 112 film critics. Both Metacritic and Rotten Tomatoes listed Boyhood as the best-reviewed film of 2014. The Village Voice poll voted Boyhood as the best film of the year.

Boyhood appeared on more critics' annual "best-of" lists in 2014 than any other film, including the most first-place votes. According to CriticsTop10.com, it was included on 536 lists and topped 189 of them—with the latter being a record by that site's count.

- 1st – Jeffrey M. Anderson – San Francisco Examiner
- 1st – Marjorie Baumgarten – The Austin Chronicle
- 1st – Peter Bradshaw – The Guardian
- 1st – Justin Chang – Variety
- 1st – Simon Crook – Empire
- 1st – A. A. Dowd – The A.V. Club
- 1st – Alonso Duralde – TheWrap
- 1st – David Edelstein – New York
- 1st – Bill Goodykoontz – The Arizona Republic
- 1st – Stephen Holden – The New York Times
- 1st – Ann Hornaday – The Washington Post
- 1st – Peter Howell – Toronto Star
- 1st – Eric Kohn – Indiewire
- 1st – Mick LaSalle – San Francisco Chronicle
- 1st – Bob Mondello – National Public Radio
- 1st – Joe Morgenstern – The Wall Street Journal
- 1st – Andrew O'Hehir – Salon
- 1st – Michael Phillips – Chicago Tribune
- 1st – Claudia Puig – USA Today
- 1st – Richard Roeper – Chicago Sun-Times
- 1st – Joshua Rothkopf – Time Out New York
- 1st – A. O. Scott – The New York Times
- 1st – Betsy Sharkey – Los Angeles Times
- 1st – Sight & Sound contributors – British Film Institute
- 1st – Peter Travers – Rolling Stone
- 2nd – Tom Brook – British Broadcasting Corporation
- 2nd – Robbie Collin – The Daily Telegraph
- 2nd – Seth Malvin – A.V. Wire
- 2nd – Richard Corliss – Time
- 2nd – Chris Nashawaty – Entertainment Weekly
- 2nd – James Rocchi – TheWrap
- 2nd – Kyle Smith – New York Post
- 2nd – Mark Kermode – BBC Radio 5 Live
- 3rd – Rex Reed – The New York Observer
- 3rd – Craig Mathieson – The Sydney Morning Herald
- 4th – James Berardinelli – Reelviews
- 5th – Richard Lawson – Vanity Fair
- 5th – Todd McCarthy – The Hollywood Reporter
- 6th – Christopher Orr – The Atlantic
- 7th – Peter Rainer – The Christian Science Monitor
- 9th – Lou Lumenick – New York Post
- 10th – Matt Zoller Seitz – RogerEbert.com
- Not ranked – Manohla Dargis – The New York Times
- Not ranked – David Denby – The New Yorker
- Not ranked – Steven Rea – The Philadelphia Inquirer
- Not ranked – Dana Stevens – Slate

=== Legacy ===
In a 2016 poll by BBC Culture, critics ranked Boyhood as the fifth greatest film since 2000. The film was also named the eighth "Best Film of the 21st Century So Far" in 2017 by The New York Times. In 2019, The Guardian ranked the film 3rd in its 100 best films of the 21st century list. In 2021, the film was ranked at No. 91 on Time Out magazine's list of The 100 best movies of all time. The February 2020 issue of New York Magazine lists Boyhood as among "The Best Movies That Lost Best Picture at the Oscars." In 2021, members of Writers Guild of America West (WGAW) and Writers Guild of America, East (WGAE) voted its screenplay 59th in WGA's 101 Greatest Screenplays of the 21st Century (So Far). In April 2023, The Hollywood Reporter put Boyhood at number 11 on "Hollywood Reporter Critics Pick the 50 Best Films of the 21st Century (So Far)."

In 2025, filmmaker Pablo Larraín cited the film as one of his favorite films, saying: "This movie is very important to me. It lives in my heart, I admire everyone who did this film. It really, really hit me. When I grow up, I would like to make a movie as good as this one." In June 2025, the film ranked number 23 on The New York Times' list of "The 100 Best Movies of the 21st Century". In July 2025, it ranked number 10 on Rolling Stone's list of "The 100 Best Movies of the 21st Century."

== Home media ==
Linklater told Hypable in July 2014 that he was planning a DVD/Blu-ray release through The Criterion Collection:

Yeah, we've got a ton of behind the scenes stuff. We made this in the era where everyone has a digital camera so we unearthed an interview from year one with Ellar, Lorelei, Patricia and myself, Patricia interviewed me in 2002. I hadn't seen this since we shot it, Ellar had forgotten quite a bit of it but he got to see himself as a wide-eyed six year old. For people who like the movie, I think there will be a lot of cool little treasures.

On August 21, Variety reported that Paramount Home Media Distribution had acquired the U.S. home entertainment rights for DVD, Blu-ray and digital distribution. IFC Films will retain VOD and EST sales as part of the deal. The film became available on Digital HD on December 9, 2014, and was released on Blu-ray and DVD on January 6, 2015. The Criterion Collection released a special edition of the film on Blu-ray and DVD on October 18, 2016.

== Accolades ==
Boyhood earned dozens of accolades, including top prizes from the New York Film Critics Circle, the Los Angeles Film Critics Association, the Chicago Film Critics Association, the Broadcast Film Critics Association, and the London Film Critics' Circle. It received both the Golden Globe Award and the British Academy Film Award for Best Film. At the 87th Academy Awards, it received an Oscar for Supporting Actress.

== See also ==
- "Barthood", an episode of The Simpsons with a similar narrative
- Up documentary film series, following the lives of 14 people over 56 years
- Merrily We Roll Along, upcoming film directed by Linklater over the course of decades
- List of films with longest production time
