= Ellar Coltrane =

American actor (born 1994)

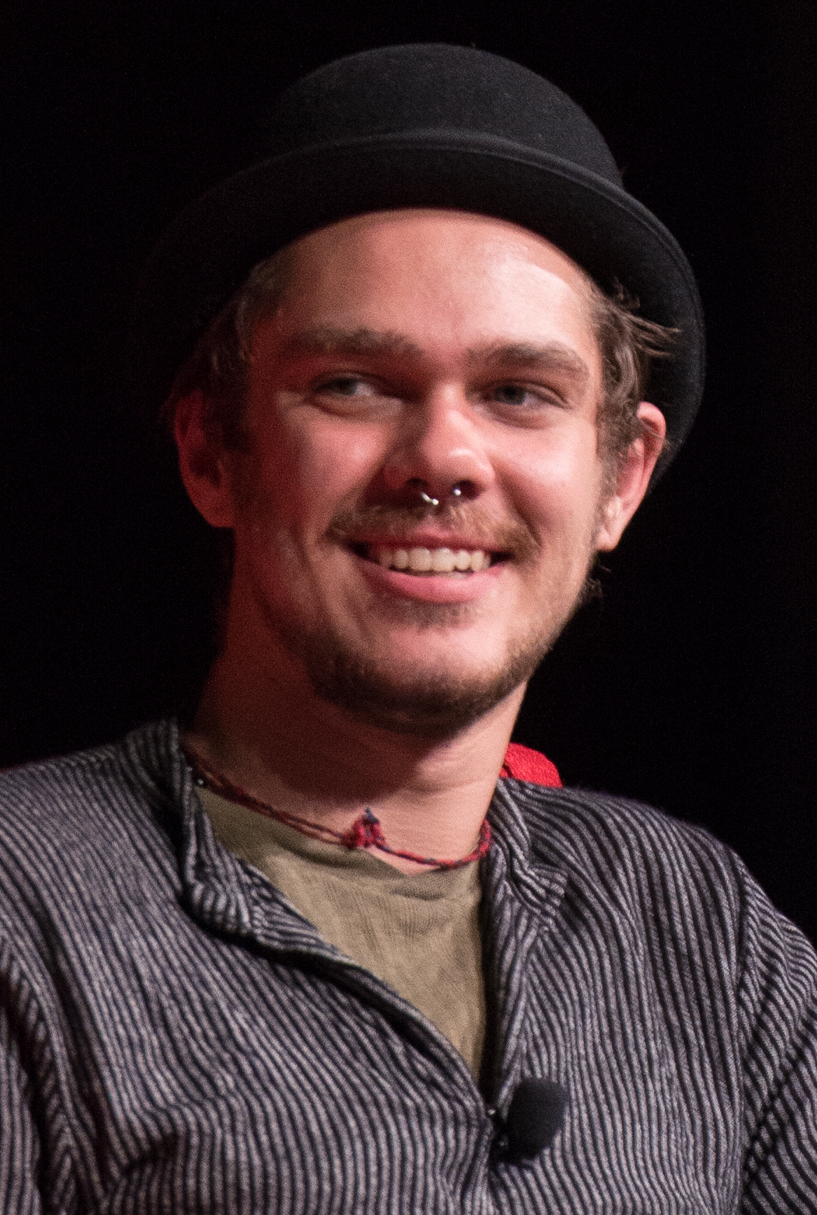
- Coltrane in 2015
- Born: Ellar Coltrane Kinney Salmon; August 27, 1994 (age 32); Austin, Texas, U.S.
- Occupation: Actor
- Years active: 2002–present

Ellar Coltrane Kinney Salmon (born August 27, 1994) is an American actor. He is best known for his role as Mason Evans Jr. in Richard Linklater's film Boyhood, for which he won the Critics' Choice Movie Award for Best Young Performer.

== Life and career ==
Coltrane was born in Austin, Texas, to Genevieve (née Kinney), an equine-assisted therapist for autistic people, and Bruce Salmon, a musician. His parents divorced when he was nine, and his mother subsequently remarried. Coltrane's half-sister, Evelyn, was born when he was 11.

In 2001, at age six, Coltrane was cast by filmmaker Richard Linklater to play the principal character in the film Boyhood; Linklater wanted to make an unprecedented film that would show a boy's coming of age, but with the actors growing up or aging on screen. Coltrane and other members of the cast were filmed intermittently for several days at a time between May 2002 and August 2013, by which time Coltrane had turned 19; there were 45 days of filming altogether. During Coltrane's childhood, he also appeared in various other films, including a small role in Linklater's 2006 film Fast Food Nation.

In 2016, Coltrane appeared in the Barack Obama drama film Barry, which premiered at the Toronto International Film Festival. The following year, he co-starred with Emma Watson in James Ponsoldt's film adaptation of the Dave Eggers novel The Circle (2017), which premiered at the Tribeca Film Festival.

According to Linklater, Coltrane lives in New Mexico and is now primarily a poet.

He’s a poet, and he acts a little bit, but he didn’t have that driven personality of an actor. Maybe to his credit. He’s a pretty chill guy, so thoughtful.

Coltrane is a volunteer fireman doing EMT training. He occasionally still acts in independent films.

== Personal life ==
In 2021, Coltrane spoke of his discomfort with binary gender roles: "For me, the binary gender demarcation always has felt just kind of like ... a charade, like this character that I have to play", and expressed a preference to be identified with singular they/them pronouns.

He has since resumed using he/him pronouns.

== Filmography ==
Year	Film	Role	Notes
2002	Lone Star State of Mind	Young Earl Crest	
2005	Faith & Bullets	Thomas Chaney Jr.	
2006	Fast Food Nation	Jay Anderson	
2009	Hallettsville	Young Tyler Jensen	
2014	Boyhood	Mason Evans Jr.	Filmed from 2002–2013
2016	Barry	Will	
2017	The Circle	Mercer Regalado	
2017	The Last Movie Star	Shane McAvoy	
2017	Blood Money	Victor	
2018	The Man Who Killed Hitler and Then the Bigfoot	"The Clerk"	
2019	Summer Night	Jameson Ford	
2020	The Good Lord Bird	Salmon Brown	
2021	El Fantasma	Lee Harvey Oswald	
2021	Shoplifters of the World	Dean	
