= Dianna Agron =

American actress and singer (born 1986)

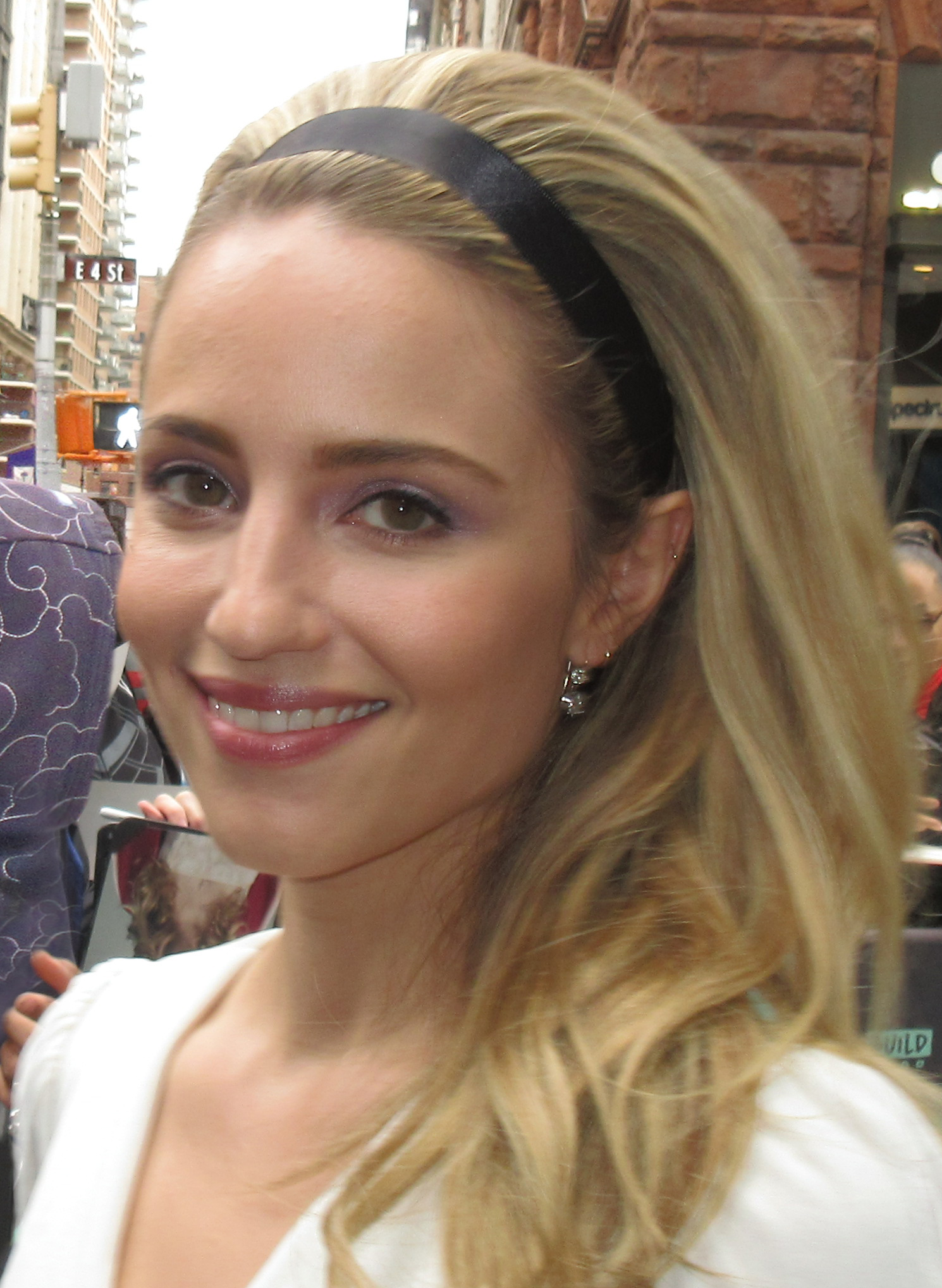
- Agron in 2017
- Born: Dianna Elise Agron; April 30, 1986 (age 40); Savannah, Georgia, U.S.
- Occupations: Actress; singer; dancer; director; producer
- Years active: 2006–present
- Works: Performances
- Spouse: Winston Marshall (m. 2016; div. 2020)
- Musical career
- Genres: Cabaret; folk-country; folk rock; jazz; Songbook; soul
- Instrument: Vocals

Signature
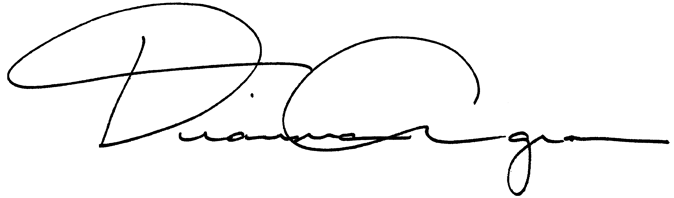

Dianna Elise Agron (/ˈeɪ.ɡrɒn/ AY-gron; (Note: IPA and respelling per Agron's description.) born April 30, 1986) is an American actress and singer. After early attention with recurring television roles, she had her breakthrough with her starring role as Quinn Fabray in the Fox musical comedy drama series Glee (2009–2015).

Agron subsequently began working in film, first starring in the popular young adult adaptation I Am Number Four (2011) as Sarah Hart before taking on films aimed at more diverse audiences, including the 2013 mob-comedy The Family and 2015's Bare. She has also directed several short films and music videos and, in 2017, began performing as a singer at the Café Carlyle in New York City, while continuing to star in films including Novitiate and Hollow in the Land in 2017, Shiva Baby in 2020, and As They Made Us in 2022. She acted in and directed part of the 2019 anthology feature film Berlin, I Love You, and returned to television as the lead in the Netflix fantasy drama series The Chosen One (2023).

Agron is Jewish and has spoken of how her religion relates to her career. She has also been involved with significant charity work, particularly in support of LGBTQ+ rights and human rights. Labeled a fashion icon, Agron's old Hollywood fashion style and appearance has garnered media attention.

== Early life ==
Dianna Elise Agron was born on April 30, 1986, in Savannah, Georgia, to Mary (née Barnes), a seamstress, and Ronald S. "Ron" Agron, a general manager of Hyatt hotels. Her father was born to a Jewish family, while her mother converted to Judaism before they married. Agron has a younger brother, Jason Agron, a photographer. She is Ashkenazi Jewish, of Ukrainian-Jewish descent; her father's family were Jewish immigrants from Novgorod-Seversky in Ukraine, (Note: See select tweets from genealogist Jennifer Mendelsohn's thread.) and the family's original surname was Agronsky. (Note: In 2010, Agron said that this name was altered by immigration officials at Ellis Island; Jennifer Mendelsohn, a board member of the Jewish Genealogy Society of Maryland and expert in Ashkenazi genealogy, researched Agron's family in 2019 and found records indicating that her great-grandfather arrived at Boston in 1906 as an infant and had his name changed sometime between 1910 and 1920 while living in Kansas City, Missouri. Mendelsohn presented documents and commentary in a tweet thread. Mendelsohn's research is supported by the database of the Agronsky family tree held by the Museum of the Jewish People at Beit Hatfutsot. (Note: See Museum of the Jewish People at Beit Hatfutsot database personalities and trees.) The 2001 book Any Way Out also traces some history of the Kansas City Agronsky family.) She is distantly related to Gershon Agron and Martin Agronsky. (Note: Dianna Agron's great-great-great-great-grandfather was Shmuel Labe Agronsky. Gershon Agron and Martin Agronsky are also descended from Shmuel Labe Agronsky. In a database held by the Museum of the Jewish People at Beit Hatfutsot, family trees including #5343 and #1325 (both of which include Gershon Agron, Martin Agronsky, and Dianna Agron) descend from Shmuel Labe Agronsky.) Agron was raised in San Antonio, Texas, and Burlingame, California; her family lived in various hotels due to her father's career, but her mother made sure that Agron and her brother knew this was not the norm. Agron has said that there was always music from the 1960s and 1970s playing at their home, and that her mother sheltered her (though not her brother) from watching contemporary films and television even as a teenager, opting to let her watch mostly classic musicals because she felt they had "a certain amount of loveliness to [them]". Being exposed to the "fairytale" and "fantastical" image of Hollywood from these films influenced Agron's decision to pursue acting, while her interest in storytelling comes from seeing different lives unfold around her growing up in the "fishbowl environment" of hotels.

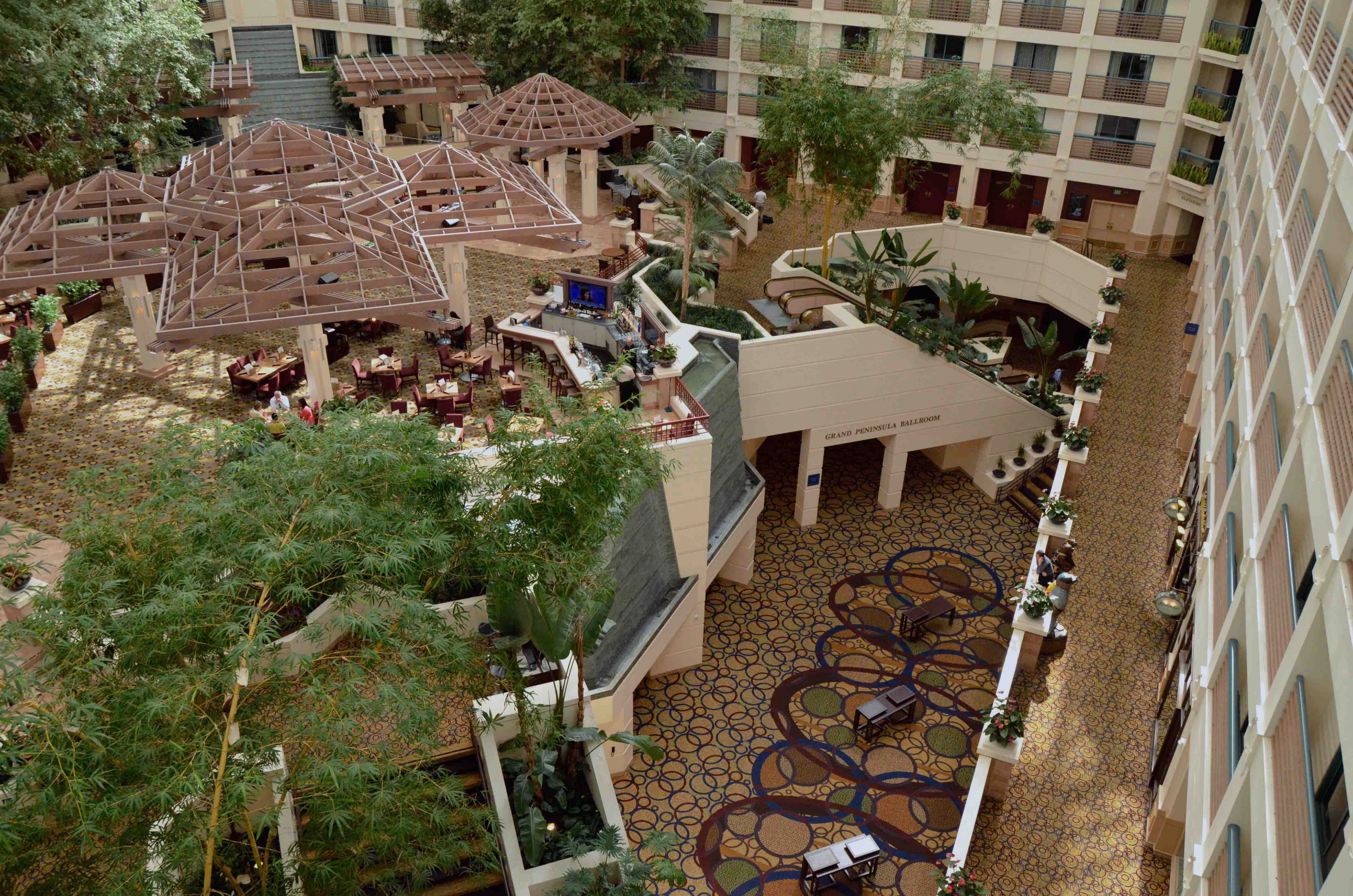
Agron lived in the Hyatt Regency San Francisco Airport for seven years from the age of nine.

Agron lived in Texas from the age of two until she was nine, and took up dancing at the age of three, studying jazz and ballet, and later hip-hop dancing. She often performed in local and school musical theater productions, including as Dorothy Gale in The Wizard of Oz when she was eight. She attended Hebrew school growing up and was educated at a Jewish day school through third grade. She was bullied harshly for her Jewish faith while living in Texas and noted that she assumed having police guarding their Temple was normal until the family moved to California, adding that being Jewish was a large part of her identity as a child because of how it ostracized her. When the family moved to California, Agron attended Lincoln Elementary School, Burlingame Intermediate School, and Burlingame High School in the Bay Area; she attended religious school and had her bat mitzvah at the Reform Judaism-practicing Peninsula Temple Sholom. She said that she found it much easier to make friends there than she had in Texas, though she described her middle school experience as sometimes unpleasant, giving the example of a boy following her around and calling her a man when, aged thirteen, her voice significantly dropped. This gave her a complex about how her voice sounded and she avoided speaking and singing in her natural register for a long time, though she overcame this and credits it with giving her a thick skin.

In high school, Agron was on the homecoming court in both her junior and senior years, tying for homecoming queen with a friend; she has said she was not "popular" in a stereotypical sense in high school, but had many friends in different groups. She was involved in school theater, performing in Vanities and Grease as a senior, and helping with set design, costumes, and painting. Agron has broken her nose twice. The first break occurred when she was fourteen, but she did not have it repaired until it was damaged again on a day off during the Glee tour. She was also injured in a traffic collision and underwent physical therapy in high school. As a teenager, Agron was a dance teacher and worked at a local boutique, Morning Glory, where she "became enthralled with fashion". Though her mother dressed her in doll-style dresses, she began experimenting with fashion in high school. She took piano lessons and said that she came to love photography in high school, as well, where she learnt on film. When she was a teenager, her father became ill with the stroke disorder CADASIL. The family thought it was multiple sclerosis after tests proved indefinitive; Agron was not made aware of his illness until she was fifteen, when he had a stroke and began losing his cognitive and physical abilities. She spoke to Cosmopolitan about the impact of this on her family, which caused her parents' marriage to fall apart, saying the separation was devastating for her and her brother. She added that she "had to play therapist to [her] family[,] be the glue". She later said that, when her father became ill, he "lost his faith for some time" and the family stopped attending Temple.

== Career ==
=== 2006–2008: Early career and Heroes ===
Agron moved to Los Angeles in 2005, attending an audition for a dance agency on the same day. She had wanted to go to New York, but instead chose Los Angeles as it was closer to her family in case she needed to support them. She was signed by the agency and told them that she wanted to be in musicals; they sent her out for music video auditions. Agron was nervous to be in music videos, worrying that she could not be considered both a dancer and an actress, though she agreed to be in the video for Robin Thicke's "Wanna Love You Girl"; she was cut when Pharrell Williams became involved and the concept was changed. Her dance agency helped her find an acting agent and she again requested to be considered for musicals, which she was told were too outdated. When she moved to Los Angeles, she also began to watch movies other than old musicals; after watching 2001 and A Clockwork Orange back-to-back she was pleasantly surprised at how much more scope there was available as an actor.

From 2006 to 2008, she appeared on television series including Shark, Close to Home, Drake & Josh, CSI: NY and Numbers. Her first film role was an uncredited appearance as a cheerleader in the 2006 remake film When a Stranger Calls. Agron told Rolling Stone that during her early career most of the film roles she was offered were horror films or nudity, and that she turned down all of these. She instead appeared in comedy films like Skid Marks and Rushers, which won the short film audience award at the 2007 Method Fest, and the action-thriller film T.K.O.. She had a recurring role in the third season of Veronica Mars as Jenny Budosh, a student in Veronica's criminology class at college who is also involved with a fraud cover-up. During her early years in Los Angeles, Agron lived in the same building as Christina McDowell and Emma Stone, which was once raided by a SWAT team, and spent time with them and other "young artists and starlets" in the neighborhood, including Lindsay Lohan and Amanda Bynes.

In 2007, she played the main role of Harper in the Milo Ventimiglia-directed MTV series It's a Mall World, alongside Sam Huntington, for its single season. She then appeared in a recurring role for the second season of Heroes as Debbie Marshall, the mean captain of the cheerleading squad at the new school Claire Bennet attends. Initially, she read for the nice cheerleader role, as she had previously been typecast as the "nice girl", but a producer thought it would be more interesting to see her play a mean character. She said that when she was cast in the role it "helped open a lot of people's eyes to [her], as an actor", because it is different to who she is as a person. During the 2007–2008 writers' strike, when auditions stopped, Agron wrote a feature screenplay about a 28-year-old man and his relationships with different women in his life as he learns how to say "I love you", which was optioned in 2008; Agron had wanted to direct the film.

=== 2009–2011: Glee, I Am Number Four and early film roles ===
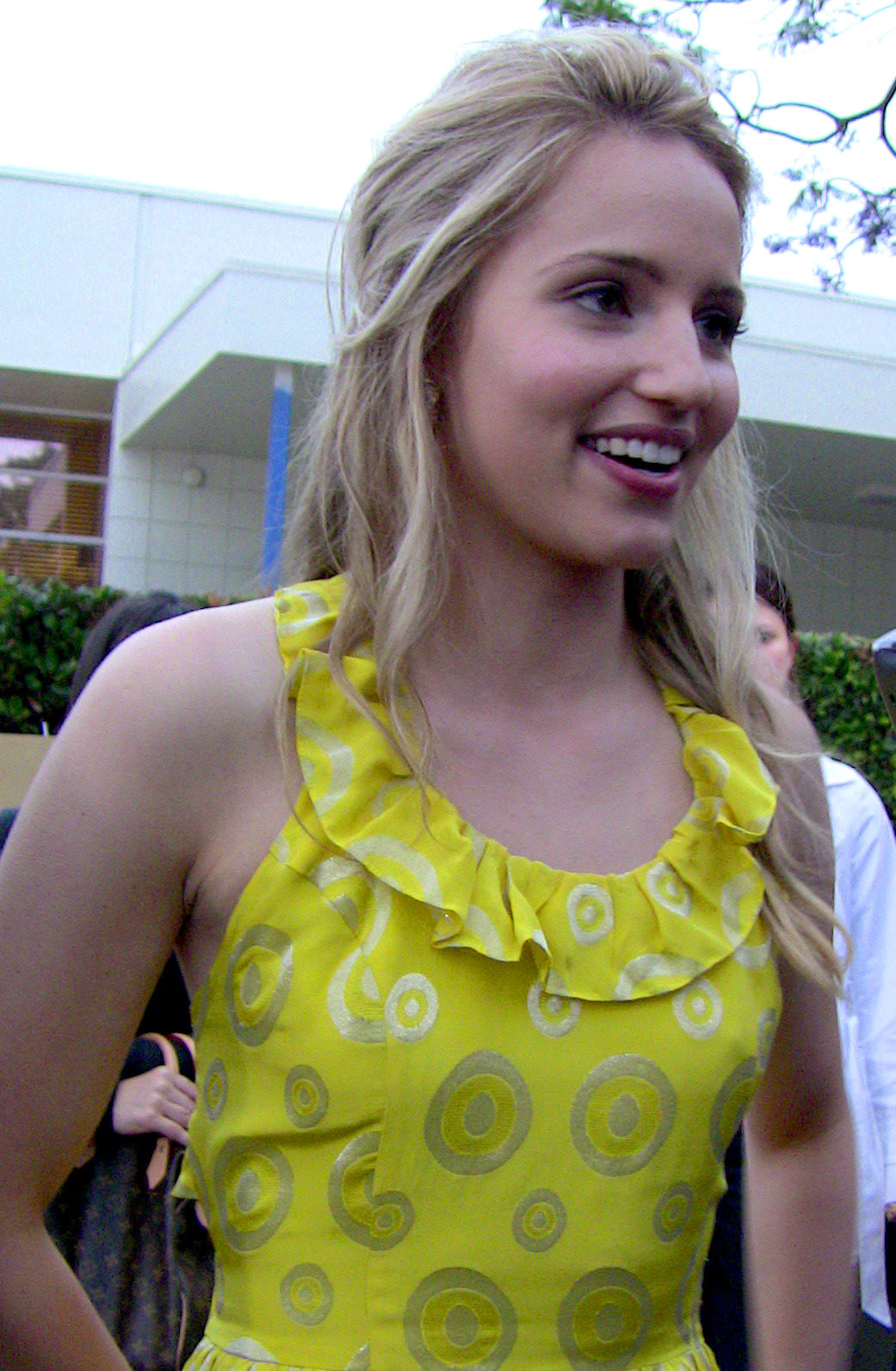
Agron at the Glee premiere party in 2009

Agron landed her breakthrough role in 2009 as Quinn Fabray on the Fox musical comedy-drama series Glee. Media journalist Jon Caramanica described the character in April 2010 as a "conniving though angelic-seeming cheerleader". Agron was the last principal actor to be cast, having won the role only days before the pilot began filming; struggling to cast Quinn, the producers were going to remove the character, but Fox wanted to keep her in the pilot and casting director Robert J. Ulrich convinced them to let him see more auditions. The producers had felt the character would be unnecessary if she could not be given more depth, though they did not initially reveal this to Agron; Ulrich told Variety that when they saw her audition, the show finally "came together". Shortly before Glee, Agron had over thirty unsuccessful auditions for a small role in a musical, and so auditioned with no expectations. In her audition she sang Frank Sinatra's "Fly Me to the Moon". Before offering her the part, the production worried she would appear too innocent and asked her to come back looking sexier; she later said that this request "was like hearing nails on a chalkboard." Of Agron's casting, showrunner Ryan Murphy said: "she ruined the part for me... she humanized it. She can cry at the drop of a hat. So now her character has a conscience, a soul and great vulnerability." Agron's portrayal of Quinn was praised, and she made her musical debut at the end of the second episode, "Showmance", performing Dionne Warwick's "I Say a Little Prayer". In 2009, members of the Glee cast, including Agron, performed the national anthem before Game 3 of the World Series.

During the hiatus away from filming Glee in the summer of 2009, Agron wrote, starred in, directed, and executive-produced an unreleased short comedy film called A Fuchsia Elephant. The plot revolves around Agron's character, Charlotte Hill, who recreates her eighth birthday party with her friend Michael, played by Dave Franco, also a producer, on the day before she turns eighteen. She directed the 2010 music video for "Body" by Thao & The Get Down Stay Down, and took on more film roles in 2010 and 2011 with various supporting parts, including Natalie in Burlesque and the cheerleader Samantha in Bold Native, an animal liberation terror film. Agron had played multiple "mean cheerleader" roles, and when she began to be offered more during Glee's first season she asked her team to start turning them away. Agron was positioned as a top choice for the role of Gwen Stacy in the reboot of the Spider-Man films when The Amazing Spider-Man began casting in 2010, but lost out to Emma Stone. Deadline reported there were concerns about the availability of Agron, who tested for the role just as Glee's second season began, due to having a large role on a major network show. In 2011 she tested for the part of Lois Lane in the DC Extended Universe film Man of Steel, though there were concerns that she was too young for the role; it went to Amy Adams.

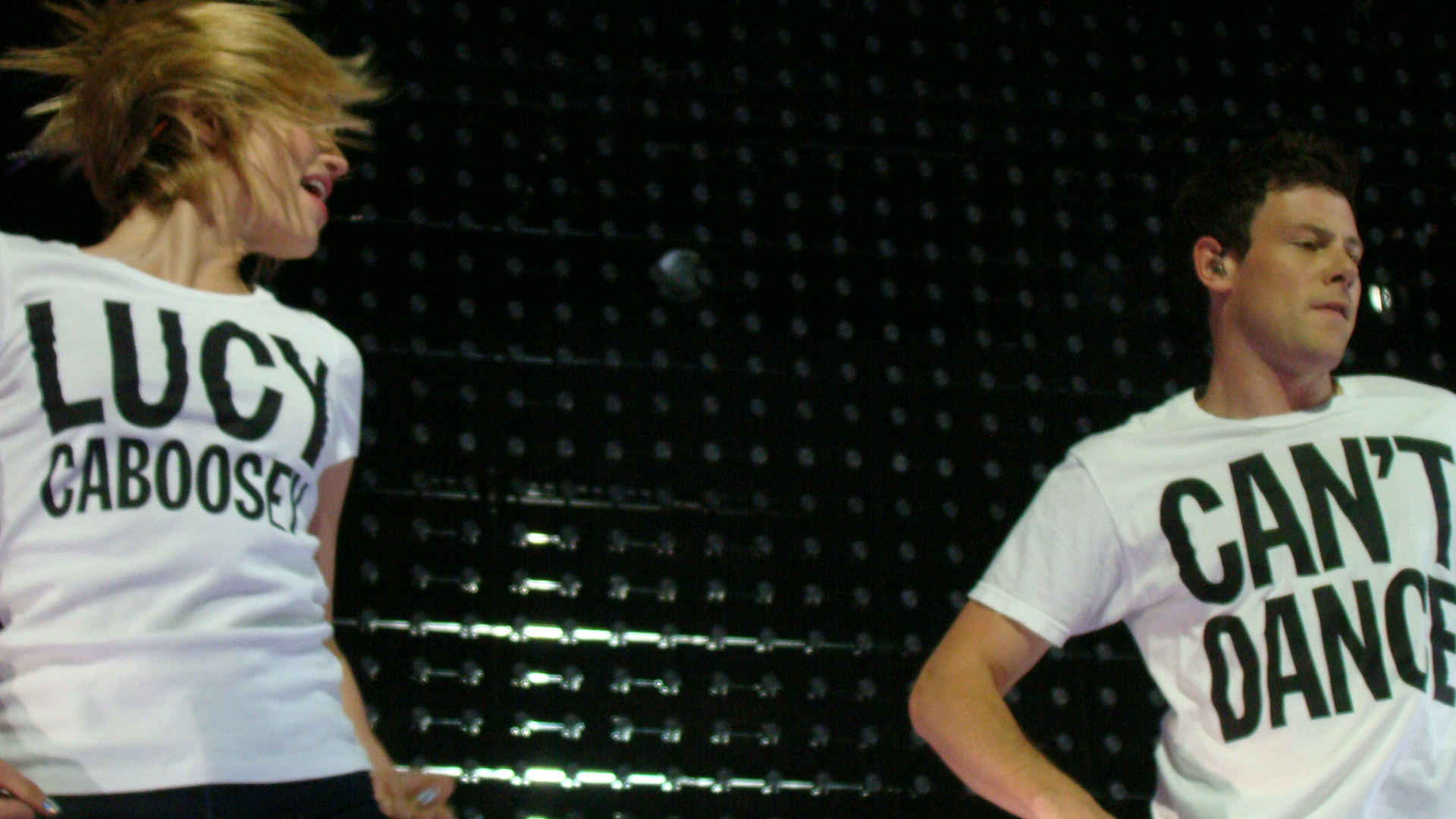
In the Glee episode "Born This Way", Agron's character Quinn is encouraged to embrace self-love by wearing a past mean nickname on a T-shirt, as the rest of her friends are doing with their flaws. The cast recreated the performance set to Lady Gaga's "Born This Way" during the tour.

During Glee's second season, Emily St. James for The A.V. Club wrote that Agron was "one of the show's best actors" but often sidelined. In the episode "Born This Way" she performed a duet with Lea Michele (as Rachel Berry) of "I Feel Pretty" from West Side Story and TLC's "Unpretty". The Observer named this the best Glee cover, praising Agron's "soft and comforting vocals" and saying that as "a cult favorite of Glee fans in 2020, this one deserves all the hype even outside the show's kitschy walls." The song has been highly praised (Note: By e.g. Rolling Stone, Insider, PopCrush.) and was voted the best Glee number in a 2011 TVLine fan vote elimination bracket. Murphy has also said it was his favorite cover from the show. As a costume and extreme makeup lover, Agron has highlighted parts of this season as her favorite moments of the show, naming "The Rocky Horror Glee Show", particularly "Time Warp", and the performance of "Thriller", (Note: In various interviews published in 2011.) though she was the cause for a brief delay in filming of the latter number when she became ill in December 2010. On Glee, Quinn often sang as a soprano, which Agron said "was on the highest part of [her] vocal register that [she] can access ... but it's not where [she feels] the most confident and comfortable". Agron rarely sang in her chest voice in the first season, and in 2011 HuffPost described Quinn's singing register as falsetto. Agron suggested that Quinn having a high voice may have been her fault, as she had auditioned using a higher speaking voice to reflect her character's young age and personality, saying: "[Quinn] sees herself as having to be elite and perfect, so I didn't see her with this [Agron's] raspy voice." She struggled to maintain the affected voice in Glee's second season, and changed it for the third. In 2011, Agron wrote the Time 100 entry for her Glee co-star Chris Colfer.

Her breakthrough movie role came in the 2011 YA adaptation I Am Number Four as co-lead Sarah Hart, whom Agron described as an "artsy kid that is a little misunderstood". Agron took on the role because it was different to her Quinn character, and said that while she wanted to work during the Glee hiatus, she would not take just any project that fit in her schedule because "it's so hard as an actor to really engage with a character and a script if you don't love it". Her filming restrictions for Glee meant she almost did not get the role. The shoot got moved to the summer, when Agron was available, and she learned she got the role a few weeks before filming. Photography began in Pittsburgh in the summer of 2010, the day after the first Glee tour finished. Reviews for the film were mixed. Agron's I Am Number Four co-lead was Alex Pettyfer; after Pettyfer dropped out of playing Tom in Seventh Son in May 2011, Agron tested for the role of Alice Deane.

I don't know if I'll ever work that hard again in my life. But as hard as everybody was working, we worked with such a loving group of people and had a great familiarity. You knew that you were coming to a space where everybody loved what they were doing. All I wanted was to be in a musical and I got it. It was a very, very special opportunity. I don't know what my life would have been like without it.

— Agron reflecting on Glee in 2019

In the third season of Glee, Agron sang her first solo number since the first season, "Never Can Say Goodbye" by the Jackson 5. The song, which had been leaked before the episode, received positive reviews. (Note: Out of reviews that gave the song a grade, The Washington Post gave the song a B−; Entertainment Weekly gave it a B; and TVLine gave it an A. Erica Futterman of Rolling Stone said that it was "a tune well-suited for Quinn's sultry voice", Emily St. James at The A.V. Club said it was the only number of the episode that worked, and Kate Stanhope for TV Guide wrote that the performance made the long wait since Agron's last solo "(almost) worth it", adding that "If this is her sign-off, it was a good one.") The character's stories in this season were less well-received, with reviews employing humor to say that the writing did not provide Agron with strong material. (Note: Both contemporaneously and in retrospect.) In one story, her character was paralyzed in a car accident, but only for four episodes before she was performing again; Agron had previously said that the story, which she discussed with Murphy, would be "slow and gradual" as Quinn struggles through accepting a more challenging situation. In 2019, The Guardian termed the brief paralysis, and the related "cringe-inducing" performance of "I'm Still Standing", as the show's "defining shark-jumping moment", though critics praised Agron's acting. (Note: Her performance was highlighted in reviews for the episode "Big Brother", which immediately followed the paralysis and featured "I'm Still Standing".) Speaking to MTV following the car accident episode, Agron said that she had "fun challenges" playing Quinn who "always was changing". After the third season aired, Agron appeared as a guest mentor on The Glee Project's second season episode "Actability".

Several songs performed by Agron as Quinn have been released as singles, made available for digital download, and featured on the show's soundtrack albums. Many songs performed on Glee were pop music, including several by Agron, though she was also noted as the show's easy listening vocalist, performing some Motown. "I Say a Little Prayer" charted in the UK Singles Chart at 125, and her cover of the Supremes' "You Keep Me Hangin' On" reached 166 on the UK Singles. These songs were released on Glee: The Music, Volume 1 (the former as an iTunes bonus track), which was nominated for a Grammy Award for Best Compilation Soundtrack for Visual Media. Caramanica criticized the fact that Agron's cover of "Papa Don't Preach" was omitted from the soundtracks, writing that it was "one of the most grounded and moving covers the show has yet done". "Papa Don't Preach" was later released as a single, charting at 81 on the UK Singles, as was "It's a Man's Man's Man's World", which charted in the Canadian Hot 100 at 73, UK Singles Chart at 94 and on the Billboard Hot 100 at 95. Her cover of "Never Can Say Goodbye" reached 107 on the Billboard charts. As a featured singer in the cast of Glee, Agron and her castmates hold numerous accolades: in 2010 they won an American Music Award, and in 2011 they were collectively nominated for two Grammy Awards as well as the Brit Award for International Breakthrough Act of the year. In 2012, they received another soundtrack album Grammy nomination. By the start of the sixth season they were the most-charting (Billboard) act in history, a record held until March 2020.

=== 2012–2014: The Family and music videos ===
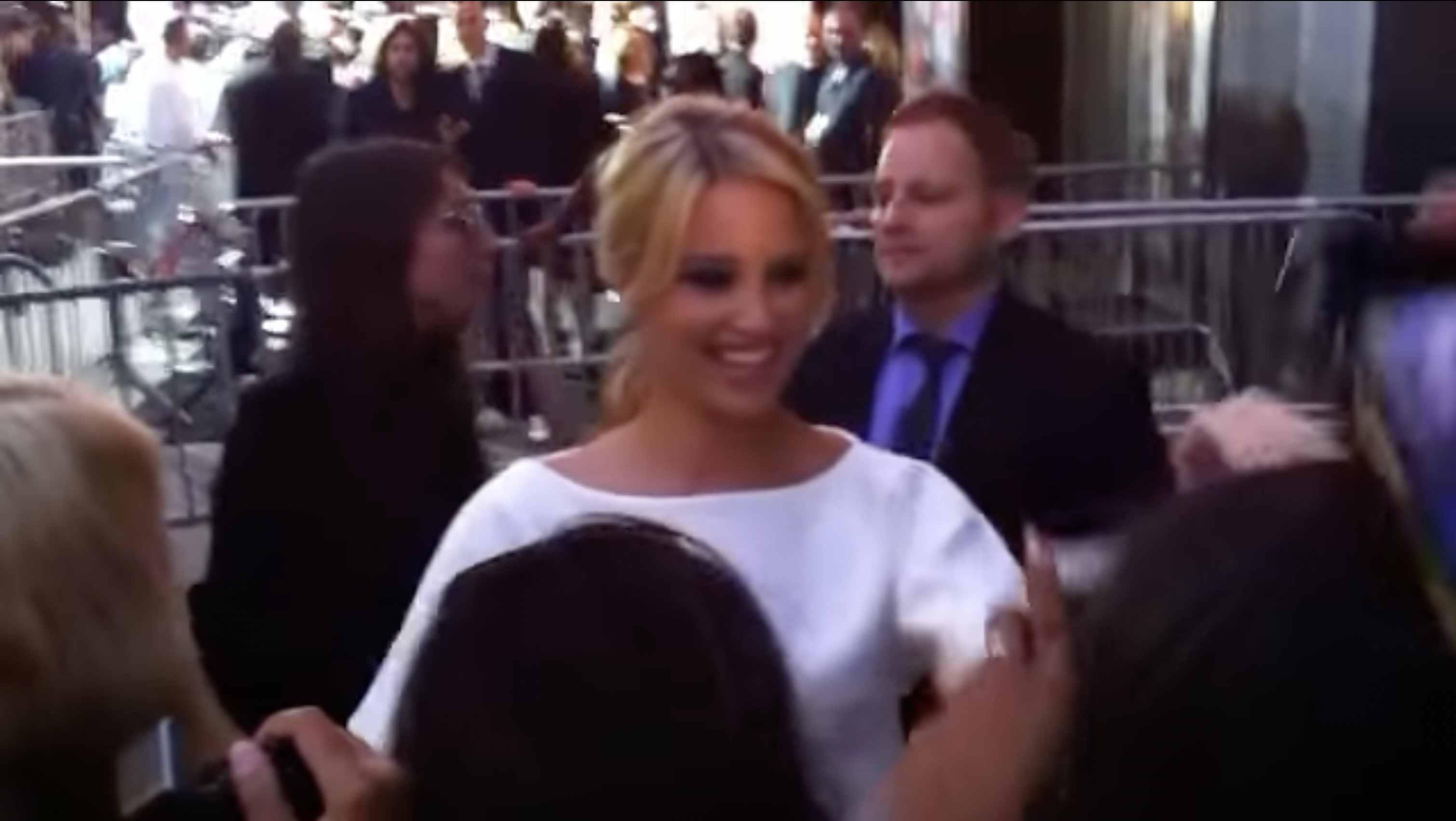
Agron at the New York premiere of The Family in 2013

Agron appeared less frequently in Glee's fourth season, being reduced to a guest star, with co-star Naya Rivera saying that she did so by choice to work on other projects; Rivera and Agron shared an argument scene in the Thanksgiving episode that Vulture said was "weirdly powerful", noting the pair "have always popped in scenes like this, and have never gotten enough of them". Agron tweeted that the scene was one of her favorites, and Murphy joked that the two characters could have a spin-off. After reducing her role on Glee, Agron became the first of the cast to "cut out on her own", playing Belle Blake in Luc Besson's ultra-violent 2013 mob comedy film The Family opposite Robert De Niro, Tommy Lee Jones, and Michelle Pfeiffer. Besson reportedly wrote Belle with Agron in mind, wanting her to be in the film after seeing her perform on Glee. The Irish Independent wrote that "Agron is one of the best things in the film [and] successfully grounds the more preposterous aspects of the plot". It opened to mixed reviews but, also seen as the breakout performer by the then-CEO of production company EuropaCorp, critics praised Agron's performance and she was nominated for a Women Film Critics Circle Award.

Later in 2013 she appeared in the music video for the Killers' tenth-anniversary track "Just Another Girl", portraying the lead singer, Brandon Flowers. Rolling Stone said that even with the real Flowers also appearing, "Agron shines as the video's star." She briefly appeared in the fifth season of Glee for the 100th episode, and was notably absent from "The Quarterback", the tribute episode for Cory Monteith. In 2014, Agron starred as the scorned bride in Sam Smith's "I'm Not the Only One" music video. Glamour wrote that Agron's "convincing Desperate Housewives act [shows] off some major acting skills [and] really brings Sam's heart wrenching pop-ballad to life". She also directed the music video for "Till Sunrise" by Goldroom, starring Gabrielle Haugh and her brother Jason, and worked as a photographer with Jason for the February 2014 issue of Galore magazine. In 2015, she directed a short film for the opening of designer Tory Burch's Paris flagship store; she was also selected by Burch to represent the brand at that year's Met Gala. Agron returned to Glee for its final season but did not appear in the episode "A Wedding", when Quinn's best friends get married, which was seen to be equally as unusual as missing "The Quarterback".

=== 2015–2019: Independent film, singing, and directing ===
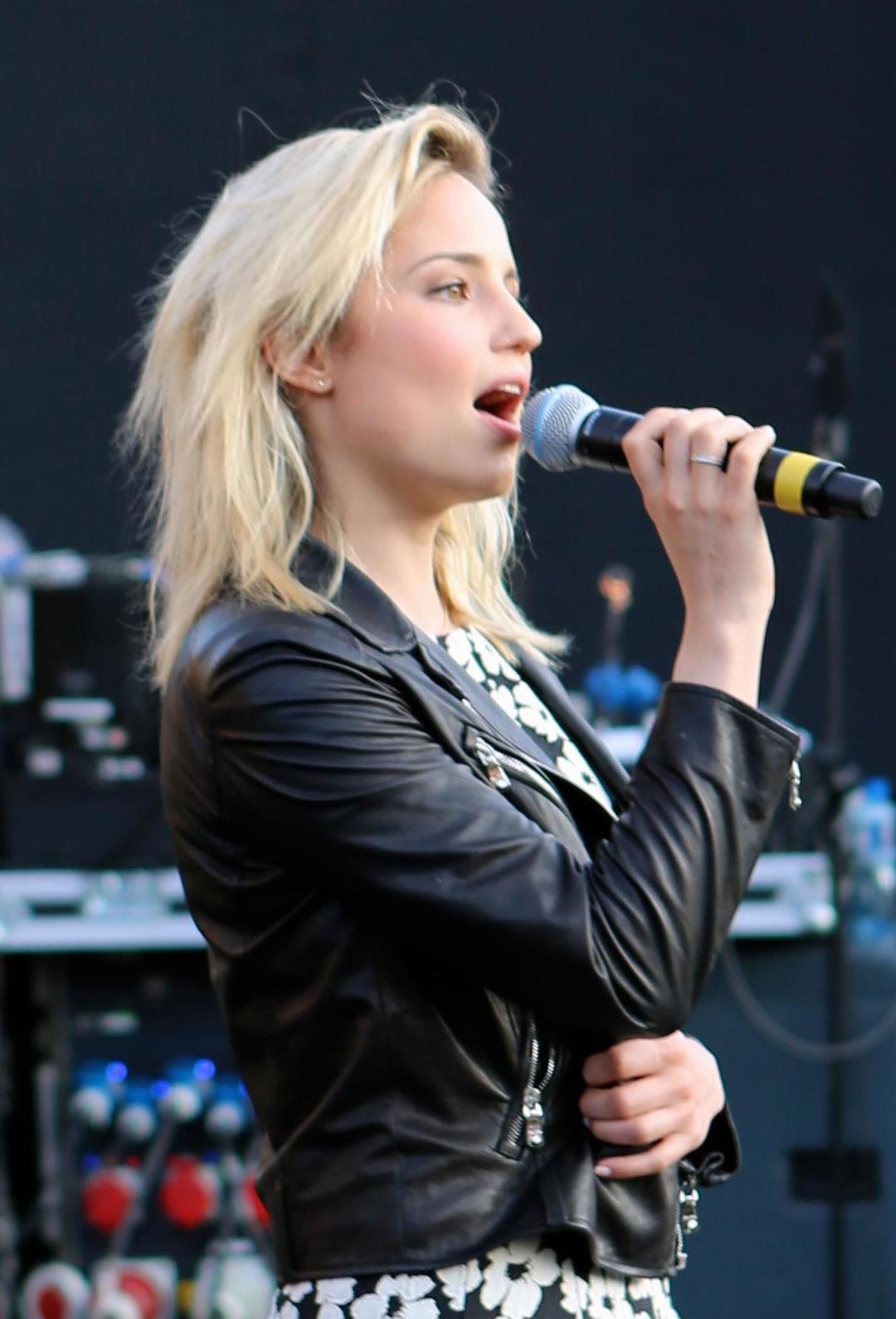
Agron performing the national anthem in 2015

After Glee, Agron pursued what critic Frank Scheck would later describe as "admirably adventurous screen choices". In 2017 she said that she had "wanted to return to doing indie films [after Glee and The Family], and found a lot of solace in doing so", explaining in 2022 that she "purposely had to recalibrate after [she] was fully off of that show, and make time for [herself]... after so many years of not having any control [and] just not [being] a person in [her] own world". She played the lead role in Natalia Leite's 2015 drama film Bare, which follows Agron's character, Sarah, as she becomes romantically involved with a female drifter. The film includes a nude scene, which had been extensively discussed between Leite and Agron, taking inspiration from My Summer of Love for the tone. Agron also made her professional theater debut in 2015. Turning down a Broadway play as she wanted to create a role, she played Dahlia in McQueen at the St. James Theatre on the West End; McQueen received generally negative reviews, and, in her PhD thesis for York University, Rebecca Halliday noted that reviews were not just profusely critical towards Agron's performance but also harsh on the actress herself. Agron was unable to reprise her role for the Theatre Royal Haymarket transfer due to filming commitments. She performed the U.S. national anthem in London at Winfield House, the U.S. ambassador's residence, for Independence Day 2015, with Katherine Jenkins performing the British national anthem.

Agron relocated to New York City in 2016 and took time away from working in that year. She appeared in several films released in 2017. She had a supporting role in the Vatican II-set film Novitiate, portraying Sister Mary Grace, a foil to the harsh instruction of the Mother Superior, opposite Melissa Leo and Margaret Qualley. Agron spoke about playing a Catholic nun as a Jewish actor, saying that she was interested in exploring faith and spirituality that exist outside of her own experiences. Justin Chang of the Los Angeles Times wrote that "in an ensemble without a weak link, special note should be made of [Agron], gently heartbreaking [in her role]", and San Francisco Chronicle's Mick LaSalle opined that as part of the ensemble, Agron, as well as Rebecca Dayan and Julianne Nicholson, "would be the highlight of any other film, the person audiences would go home talking about". Agron also portrayed Alison Miller, the lead of the drama Hollow in the Land. The film was often compared to Winter's Bone, (Note: E.g. in NOW, The Village Voice, Los Angeles Times, The Globe and Mail, Toronto Star.) with The New York Times saying that the "movie is not as tense [as Winter's Bone], but it gets close thanks to Ms. Agron's resolute performance and [its] hostile small town setting"; The Hollywood Reporter said that "Agron delivers a compelling turn in this atmospheric backwoods mystery."

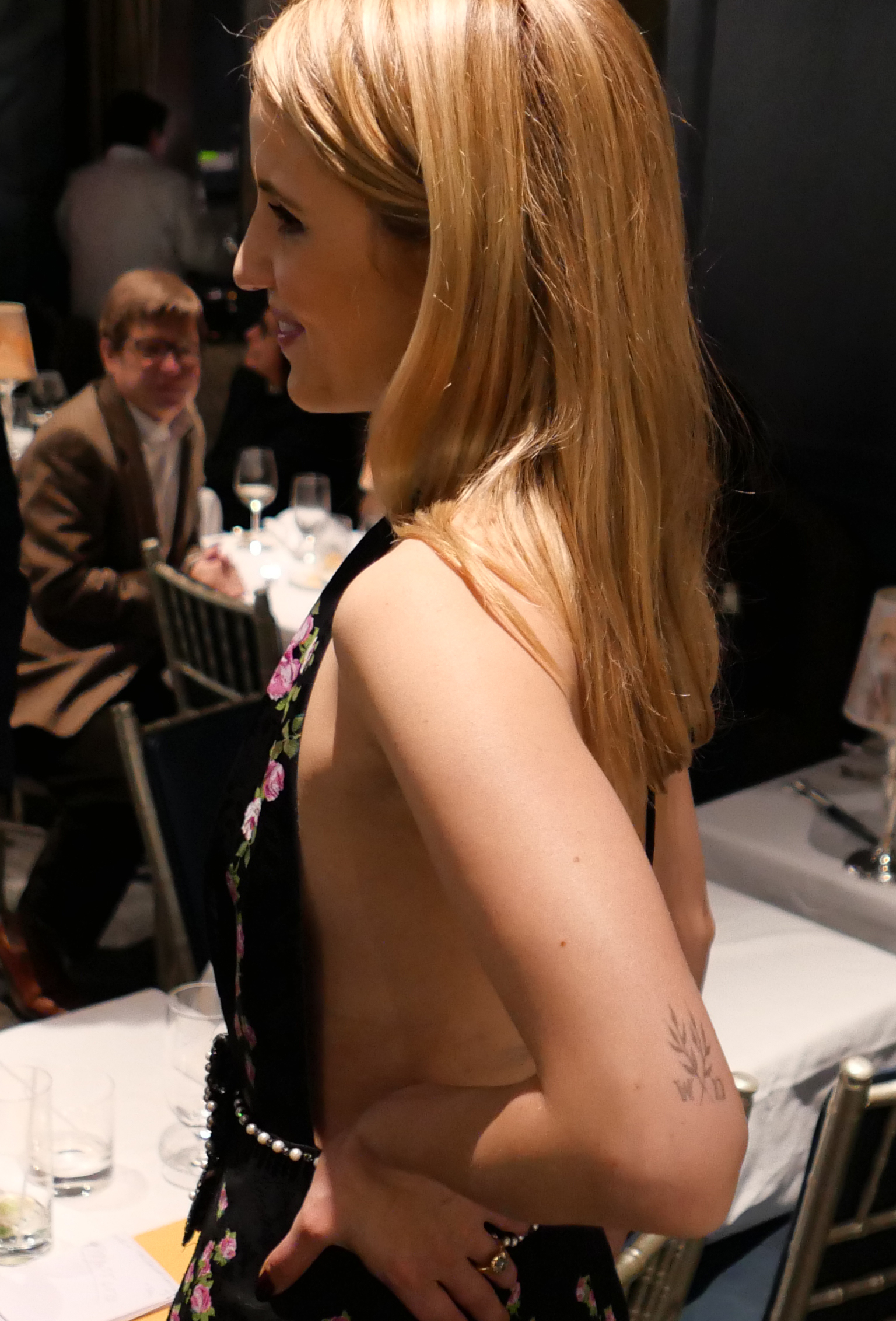
Agron in the Carlyle after performing in January 2019

In September 2017, Agron made her singing debut with a residency at the Café Carlyle, saying that she "missed singing publicly" and wanted to pursue this again in New York. In her set she performed music originally sung by male acts, with BroadwayWorld noting that, for possibly the first time, people would hear her sing in her preferred register; she told WWD that she saw an improvement in her vocal quality using her own register again after being uncomfortable hitting high notes for Glee. Music critic Will Friedwald described her as "a post-millennial update of Julie London"; Paul Hagen of Metrosource said that her lower range "is smooth as single malt scotch"; and Theater Pizzazz's Eric J. Grimm wrote that, "free of auto tune and songs out of her vocal range, she reveals herself to be a capable and precise singer with an appreciation for excellent lyrics." Agron returned to the Carlyle in January and February 2019, again performing a setlist "tailored for her husky register", with a larger band. This performance was advertised to feature songs by female acts, though she still sung many songs performed by men. Of the second show, Matt Smith, also Theater Pizzazz, said that Agron used minimal commentary, which "[felt] as if she's second-guessing herself", but that any lack of expression in commentary was made up for by her expression through the songs; Agron selected songs that she found romantic and playful. Smith complimented that her voice is "soothing and soulful, [and] makes the already-cozy Café Carlyle feel that much more intimate". Agron suggested that she would consider releasing an album, but not of the pop music featured on Glee.

Berlin, I Love You, an instalment of the Cities of Love anthology film series, was released in 2019. Agron directed a segment in the film from a screenplay by David Vernon, as well as playing a puppeteer who reinvigorates the life of a burnt-out Hollywood star played by Luke Wilson. She was initially approached to act in the segment, and asked if she could direct it instead before being hired for both roles; filming for the segment took one day. Reception to the film was generally negative: Peter Debruge of Variety wrote that "by and large, the film feels aimless and uninspired ... the most effective sequence may be [Agron's] offering", a sentiment echoed by Jackie K. Cooper, while Peter Sobczynski of RogerEbert.com felt it was "such a wan little embarrassment that its presence can only be explained by the fact that ... Wilson and Agron might attract a few more viewers."

=== 2020–present: Return to prominence ===
Starting with 2020's Shiva Baby, Agron began appearing in more prominent independent films, with well-received performances; Rolling Stone also noted that most of the films or Agron's characters of this period were identifiably Jewish, in contrast to her previous roles.

Agron played Kim Beckett in Shiva Baby, a comedy set at a Jewish mourning service. The film and its cast received widespread praise, with some reviews noting the depth Agron brought to her role. The Hollywood Reporter, /Film, and Variety described her performance as "perfect" and "flawless". She then portrayed Laura Riding in the historical biopic The Laureate; telling the story of Riding's life with Robert Graves and their lovers, it premiered in 2021. In As They Made Us, directed by Mayim Bialik and released in April 2022, Agron played the lead role, Abigail, alongside Dustin Hoffman and Candice Bergen. Abigail is the daughter of Hoffman and Bergen's characters; Agron had previously played Bergen's daughter in the 2010 film The Romantics and said it was "super special" to work with her again at a different stage.

As They Made Us deals with parental death, something to which Agron related due to experiences with her own father's illness. She noted that about a year before filming the project she had finally become ready to address father-daughter relationships in her work; the theme is also present in Acidman, a film Agron began working on in 2020. Acidman, a two-hander starring Agron and Thomas Haden Church, was released in 2023, as was the Hulu/Disney+ release Clock, a sci-fi horror film with Agron in the lead role. She also returned to television for the first time since Glee in 2023 to be part of the main cast of the Netflix original television show The Chosen One, with her dialog in Spanish and English.

In March and April 2022, Agron performed her third residency at the Café Carlyle. Reviews noted her charming commentary and ability to connect with the audience, with Front Row Center writing that her "alluring badinage is as delightful as her song." Stephen Mosher for BroadwayWorld said that her "famously husky ... whisky tenor and relaxed stylings [bring] an atmosphere of levity and love". Agron returned to the venue in 2024, and as of February 2025 was working on her first jazz album.

== Public image ==
=== Image and fashion ===
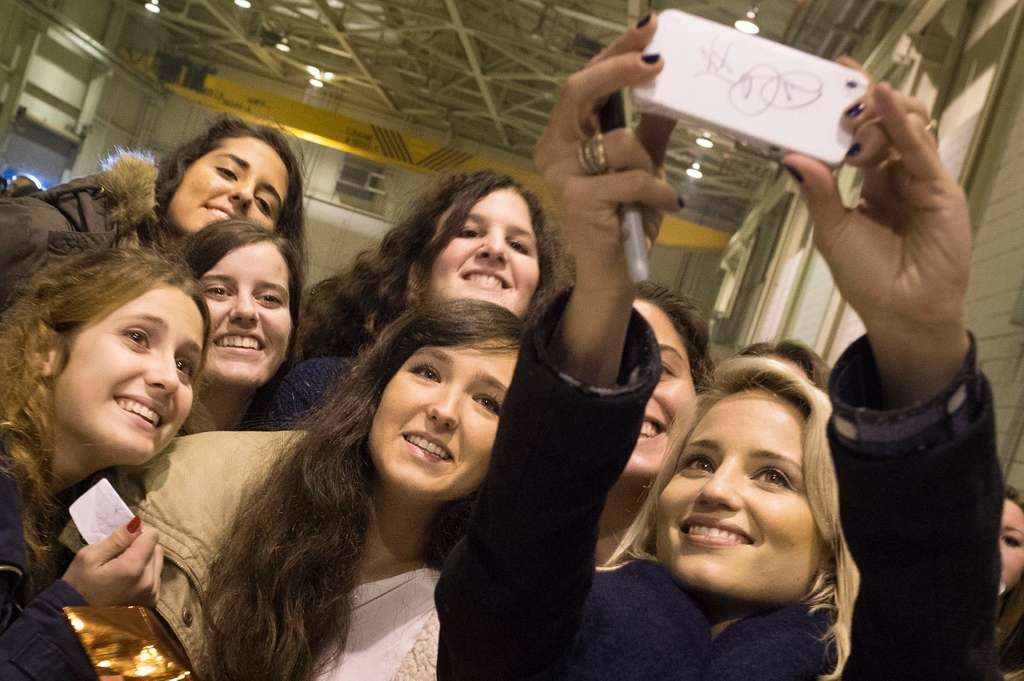
Agron taking a selfie with fans in 2014

Agron's public image and style have been described as "old Hollywood", something she has enjoyed since she was a child admiring figures including Audrey Hepburn, Lucille Ball and Leslie Caron. (Note: Description in various fashion papers and columns. Agron has named these as her icons, as well as Sophia Loren; Grace Kelly; Katharine Hepburn; and Cary Grant, in various interviews.) Like classic stars, Agron sometimes speaks with a slight Mid-Atlantic accent, and she has connected her views on keeping private to this era, saying: "I think people know too many things about actors these days ... Back in the day, you knew very little about the stars". The role of Quinn in Glee saw Agron nominated for the Teen Choice Award for Female Breakout Star in 2010, and she and other cast members were awarded the Screen Actors Guild Award for Ensemble in a Comedy Series that same year. In 2011, her roles in Glee and I Am Number Four saw Agron place on the IMDb list of top emerging stars, and the Victoria's Secret models ranked her as the sexiest smile in Hollywood. Following the death of Cory Monteith in 2013, Agron criticized the lack of privacy afforded her Glee castmates by paparazzi, though said she had come to accept this kind of treatment in exchange for the positives of being an actor. Agron has since said that the level of success Glee had when she was in her early twenties "[catapulted her] into a world [in which she was] not very equipped to, kind of, explore that coming-of-age in the public eye", adding that the sudden emergence of social media at the time did not help; she explained that she chose to travel to keep grounded. Agron was one of the most-followed and most influential celebrities on Twitter in 2012 and 2013.

Entertainment Tonight has called Agron a "fashion icon", and Vogue magazine has covered her style and taste, praising her takes on different styles and remixing fashion. (Note: See Vogue features on Agron's fashion.) She has been credited with influencing the popularity of the fishtail braid; shaggy bob; and pompadour hairstyles.. Agron describes her style as "eclectic", adding that she enjoys dressing in both feminine and masculine looks. In 2015, she said that her style and the way she presents herself are "more to the prudish side". In 2010, she appeared on the cover of GQ with Glee co-stars Michele and Monteith; after "minor controversy" following complaints that the actors were dressed too provocatively for their younger fans, Agron wrote an apology on her blog. Agron and her Glee character are referenced in the controversial 2016 song "Einstein yori Dianna Agron" by Japanese idol group HKT48, as the epitome of beauty and charm. She is also named in the liner notes of the Taylor Swift song "22", as an inspiration of the song, and some fans have speculated that Swift's song "Wonderland" also references her.

...when I started my career [my grandmother] would say, "When are you going to play a nice Jewish girl?" And I'd say, "When the industry will start seeing me as one."

— Agron speaking in 2023 on her roles

Though she became known for playing the gentile across from Jewish characters, Agron is a practicing Jew. She knows Hebrew and visited Israel to study her faith in 2016. The debate on Jewish characters being portrayed by Jewish actors became prominent in 2018 with the success of The Marvelous Mrs. Maisel, with a response from physiognomist Sharrona Pearl in Jewish culture magazine Tablet referring to Agron and her roles as overtly shiksa characters in debating representation. Other Jewish media have commented on Agron's Glee character, with the Jewish Women's Archive suggesting that she may have made cheerleading more visible to Jewish girls, and Agron's appearance, with Hey Alma noting that this is "something the Jewish media loves to talk about, somewhat saltily." More discussions of actors' Jewishness came with the release of Shiva Baby, which has a non-Jewish lead actress while Agron's Kim is, ironically, the only character in the film who is not considered Jewish; writer-director Emma Seligman said that Agron was excited to be involved in a Jewish movie, saying that it was "so sad to hear, but because of her looks, [Agron's] Jewishness is constantly questioned".

=== Relationships ===
While Agron is known for keeping her romances private, she has been in several high-profile relationships. In July 2010, she began dating British actor Alex Pettyfer, her I Am Number Four co-star. Despite reported difficulties they began cohabiting in 2010. The couple had a messy break-up in February 2011, the day after the film was released, with reports that he threatened her over the phone and had a "heated confrontation" with actor Sebastian Stan, someone with whom Agron was close in early 2011. She temporarily moved to a hotel under a false name so that Pettyfer would not be able to find her, and Pettyfer was instructed not to attend an event at which she would be present. In early 2011, Agron met actor Chris Evans at an Oscars party and the two were linked in April that year; reportedly, Evans' brother Scott was a fan of Agron from Glee and supported the idea of the couple. Agron began dating Stan in June 2011; they split in December, due to Agron being unable to spend time with him while having to work on Glee, but began dating again in February 2012 and were still together in April.

It was first reported that Agron was dating Mumford & Sons guitarist Winston Marshall in July 2015, and the couple became engaged in winter 2015/16. They were married on October 15, 2016, in Morocco, with Agron wearing a Valentino Fall 2016 off-the-runway dress noted as one of the most expensive celebrity wedding dresses ever. Agron and Marshall kept their relationship private, including not posting about each other on social media. After splitting, they separated in 2019 and divorced in 2020. In 2022, Marshall said that splitting up, which they did around the same time he got sober, was painful.

In May 2023, an interview with the Belgian painter Harold Ancart stated that he and Agron had been together for almost two years and live together in New York. The year prior, it was reported that an incident involving Agron and the publisher Lucas Zwirner caused Ancart to suddenly cut ties with the art dealer and gallery owner (and Lucas' father) David Zwirner.

Agron's sexuality has been subject to much public speculation; lesbian culture website Autostraddle reflected that Agron wearing a T-shirt reading "Likes Girls" in 2011 "was the moment that started the whole [internet] gay discourse", and a 2016 episode of IFC's Boxed In satirized Agron making ambiguous statements on the subject, something common in Celesbian culture. Her close friendship with Taylor Swift in the early 2010s led to some fans developing a theory that Swift is "secretly gay". Agron was asked about the theory's veracity on Jimmy Kimmel Live! in 2012, and by Rolling Stone in 2023.

== Activism ==
=== Charity and advocacy ===
A clip of Agron hosting the GLAAD Media Awards in San Francisco in 2012

The Guardian noted in 2015 that Agron is "also known for her activism, supporting charities and advocacy groups when not acting." She is an activist for LGBT+ rights and human rights, and has said that being able to engage with large-scale charity work is one of the positives of her job. She has also given her time to charitable endeavors supporting children, including organizations like Camp Wonder and UNICEF, and has hosted and participated in various fundraisers for literacy non-profit 826LA, including emceeing the 2010 concert "Chickens in Love". Since 2012, Agron has been a GLAAD Spirit Day ambassador, and since 2014 she has been a Global Citizen Ambassador, regularly participating in the Global Citizen Festival. (Note: Including in 2014, 2016, 2017, and 2019.) In politics, Agron has endorsed every Democratic presidential candidate since 2012, and canvassed for Harris in 2024, which she said in an Instagram story was her first time canvassing.

In 2011 she attended the Trevor Project's Trevor Live! with Glee co-stars Kevin McHale and Darren Criss, and on June 2, 2012, she hosted the GLAAD Media Awards in San Francisco. Naya Rivera and Cory Monteith had hosted a parallel event on March 24, 2012, in New York City, auctioning off kisses to the audience; Agron did the same, raising $5,500 for the campaign. In women's rights, Agron spoke at the 18th San Francisco Power of Choice Luncheon to celebrate the 40th anniversary of Roe v. Wade in 2013, and criticized the Supreme Court of the United States when it repealed this in June 2022. In the arts, Agron works with Platform Presents, a British organization founded by Gala Gordon to provide a platform to new talent, and is an advocate for female filmmakers: she was a jurist for the Nora Ephron Prize at the 2017 Tribeca Film Festival, and for the Through Her Lens grant at Tribeca in 2017 and 2018. Supporting youth causes, in 2014, Agron took part in a charity weekend as part of the Big Slick Foundation, an organization of Kansas City-related celebrities, to help raise funds for Children's Mercy Hospital, and she and other Glee stars participated in the Young Storytellers Foundation "Glee Big Show", which featured live performances of five scripts written by fifth grade students to support arts programs in public schools. In August 2014 she wrote an article for NBC News to promote United Nations (UN) International Youth Day.

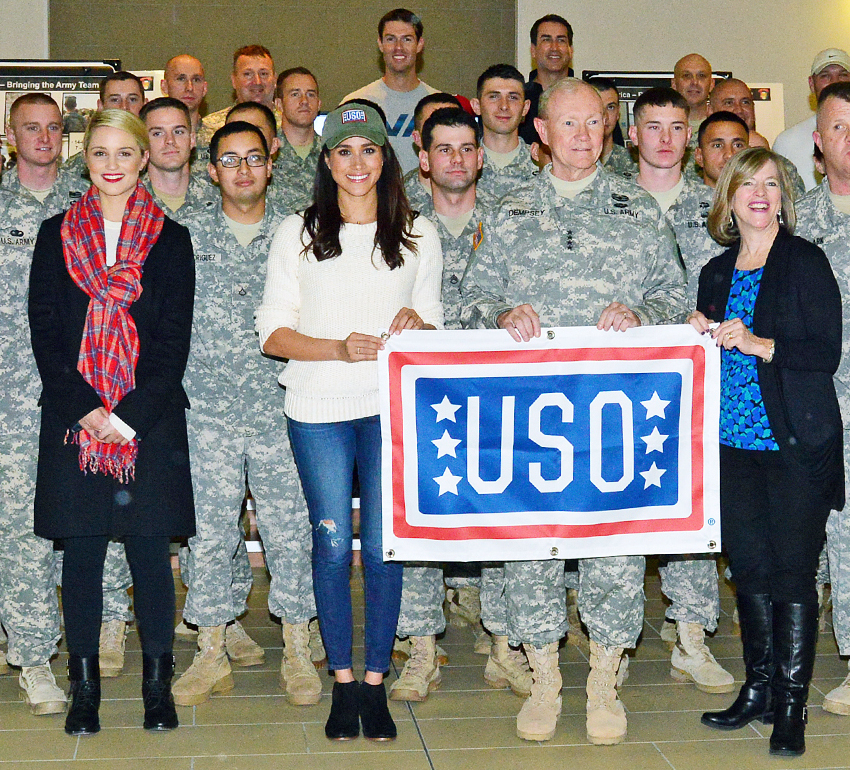
Agron and Meghan Markle with General Martin Dempsey and others on a USO tour in Italy in 2014

Agron has prominently been a supporter of charities for refugees, particularly children, affected by war. In 2012, Agron visited the Somaly Mam Foundation's Kampong Cham center, where she met child and teenage residents, and in 2013 she promoted a campaign fundraiser benefiting the foundation. In November 2014, Agron, among many other international artists, was featured on the United Nations Children's Fund charity single "Imagine". She has raised money and advocated for War Child since 2014, particularly for Syrian refugees, and in 2016, she traveled with the UN to visit resettled Syrian refugees in Austria and Jordan. She has also supported military personnel, providing services and live entertainment to United States troops and their families as part of the December 2014 United Service Organizations tour at Bagram air field, Afghanistan, and locations in Spain, Italy, Turkey, and the UK.

=== You, Me and Charlie ===
You, Me & Charlie (YM&C) was a curation platform launched by Agron on December 12, 2011. Along with help from several other contributors, she wrote and collected posts on subjects including music, art, fashion, and daily inspiration. The name of the website refers to Charlie, one of Agron's childhood nicknames, "her male alter ego[,] and the star of the short stories she'd write in high school". Several short films and videos created by Lexy Hulme, a dancer and friend of Agron, were also shared on the website, which accepted submissions for inspiration posts through a related Tumblr blog. The site served as inspiration for young artists, and Vanity Fair championed it as a stress reliever, saying that the site is "full of sunshine, optimism, and pretty people"; InStyle promoted how the platform spread activism, saying that "these days it seems every celebrity has an online presence [but] Agron uses social media in a truly inspired way." The idea for YM&C came from how "people really responded so well to [Agron's personal blog], so [she] just wanted to open it up and have it be more of a community". In February 2013, Agron hosted a concert for the curation blog in Los Angeles, where she performed Fleetwood Mac's "Dreams" and Tina Turner's "What's Love Got to Do with It" with the band A House For Lions.

== Selected filmography ==
- Veronica Mars (2006–2007)
- It's a Mall World (2007)
- Heroes (2007)
- Skid Marks (2007)
- T.K.O. (2007)
- Glee (2009–2015)
- The Romantics (2010)
- Burlesque (2010)
- I Am Number Four (2011)
- Glee: The 3D Concert Movie (2011)
- The Family (2013)
- Tumbledown (2015)
- Bare (2015)
- Zipper (2015)
- Unity (2015)
- Hollow in the Land (2017)
- Novitiate (2017)
- Ralph Breaks the Internet (2018)
- Berlin, I Love You (2019)
- Shiva Baby (2020)
- The Laureate (2021)
- As They Made Us (2022)

== Awards and nominations ==
Year	Association	Category	Work	Result	Ref.
2010	American Music Awards	Favorite Soundtrack Album	Glee: The Music, Volume 3 Showstoppers (Glee cast)	Won	
2010	Breakthrough of the Year Awards	Breakthrough Newcomer	Herself	Won	
2010	Gay People's Choice Awards	Best Ensemble TV Cast	Glee	Won	
2010	Gay People's Choice Awards	Favorite Music Duo or Group	Glee cast	Won	
2010	Gold Derby TV Awards	Ensemble of the Year	Glee	Nominated	
2010	Lesbian/Bi People's Choice Awards	Favorite Music Duo or Group	Glee cast	Nominated	
2010	Nickelodeon Australian Kids' Choice Awards	Fave International Band	Glee cast	Nominated	
2010	Screen Actors Guild Awards	Outstanding Performance by an Ensemble in a Comedy Series	Glee	Won	
2010	Teen Choice Awards	Choice TV: Female Breakout Star	Glee	Nominated	
2010	Teen Choice Awards	Choice Music: Group	Glee cast	Nominated	
2010	TV Land Awards	Future Classics	Glee	Won	
2011	Brit Awards	International Breakthrough Act	Glee cast	Nominated	
2011	Grammy Awards	Best Compilation Soundtrack for Visual Media	Glee: The Music, Volume 1 (Glee cast)	Nominated	
2011	Screen Actors Guild Awards	Outstanding Performance by an Ensemble in a Comedy Series	Glee	Nominated	
2011	Teen Choice Awards	Choice TV: Female Scene Stealer	Glee	Nominated	
2011	Teen Choice Awards	Choice Music: Group	Glee cast	Nominated	
2012	Giffoni Film Festival	Giffoni Experience Award	Herself	Won	
2012	Grammy Awards	Best Compilation Soundtrack for Visual Media	Glee: The Music, Volume 4 (Glee cast)	Nominated	
2012	Screen Actors Guild Awards	Outstanding Performance by an Ensemble in a Comedy Series	Glee	Nominated	
2012	Shorty Awards	Best Blogger in Social Media	Herself ([felldowntherabbithole] and You, Me & Charlie)	Nominated	
2012	Teen Choice Awards	Choice TV: Female Scene Stealer	Glee	Nominated	
2013	Napa Valley Film Festival	Rising Star Award	Herself (with Miles Teller)	Won	
2013	Screen Actors Guild Awards	Outstanding Performance by an Ensemble in a Comedy Series	Glee	Nominated	
2013	Shorty Awards (Note: Shortlisting occurs before nomination/finalists. There were no winners awarded in the Art, Blogger, or Fashion categories.)	Best Actress in Social Media	Herself	Shortlisted	
2013	Shorty Awards	Best Artist, Art Critic, or Art Aficionado in Social Media	Herself	Shortlisted	
2013	Shorty Awards	Best Artist, Art Critic, or Art Aficionado in Social Media	You, Me & Charlie	Nominated	
2013	Shorty Awards	Best Blogger in Social Media	Herself	Shortlisted	
2013	Shorty Awards	Best Blogger in Social Media	You, Me & Charlie	Shortlisted	
2013	Shorty Awards	Best Celebrity in Social Media	Herself	Nominated	
2013	Shorty Awards	Best Comedian or Comedy in Social Media	You, Me & Charlie	Shortlisted	
2013	Shorty Awards	Best Fashion Diva, Brand, or Model in Social Media	Herself	Shortlisted	
2013	Women Film Critics Circle Awards	Best Young Actress	The Family	Nominated	
2015	BroadwayWorld UK/West End Awards	Best Featured Actress in a New Production of a Play	McQueen	Nominated	
2021	The ReFrame Stamp	Narrative Feature	Shiva Baby	Won	
2022	Apolo Awards	Best Ensemble Cast	Shiva Baby	Won	
2022	Chlotrudis Society for Independent Films	Best Performance by an Ensemble Cast	Shiva Baby	Won	
2022	Dallas International Film Festival	Best Narrative Feature	Acidman (as producer)	Won	

== See also ==
- GQ's Glee photoshoot controversy
- "Einstein yori Dianna Agron" controversy

== Works cited ==
=== Audio-visual media ===
- Adesioye, Lola (March 23, 2021). Lola Adesioye sits down with Emma Seligman, Rachel Sennott & Dianna Agron to discuss their film Shiva Baby. Emma Seligman, Rachel Sennott, Dianna Agron (interviewees). Soho House Film. Event occurs at 9:41–12:50. Archived from the original on May 31, 2022. "[Lola Adesioye, interviewer:] ... there's a lot [in Shiva Baby] around the concept of people's expectations ... in terms of how you look, what you're doing and who you're with, who you're married to ... was that something purposeful that you wanted to highlight; there seems like there's this real interplay between the public self and how you appear to other people, whether it's your parents or wider community, and then your private stuff ... [Agron:] Yeah, I felt that big time ... I was coming-of-age publicly, because I started Glee at 22 years old, and so as I was discovering who I was as a person, my sexuality, everything, I also felt like that had to be very removed from the public ..."
- Agron, Dianna (May 17, 2010). Oxfam America presents Body by Thao with the Get Down Stay Down directed by Dianna Agron of Glee. Oxfam. Archived from the original on September 11, 2018 – via YouTube.
- Agron, Dianna (March 15, 2015a). Dianna Agron about her journey in Hollywood. Take Hollywood. Archived from the original on March 21, 2015.
- Bialik, Mayim; Cohen, Jonathan (April 5, 2022). Dianna Agron: Uncover, Discover, Discard. Mayim Bialik's Breakdown. Dianna Agron (interviewee). Archived from the original on April 5, 2022 – via YouTube.
- Garibaldi, Christina (2012). 'Glee' Star Dianna Agron Loves Her Character's Growth. MTV News. Dianna Agron (interviewee). Paramount Network. Archived from the original on February 5, 2021.
- Hennelly, Denis Henry (February 13, 2012). Bold Native. Gather Films. Archived from the original on October 16, 2013.
- Kelly, Lorraine (May 14, 2015). Dianna Agron On Her Career. Lorraine. Archived from the original on November 8, 2020 – via YouTube.
- Kenney, Kevan (October 26, 2017). The Similarites [sic] Between Dianna Agron & Her Character In 'Novitiate'. Dianna Agron (interviewee). Build – via YouTube.
- Kenney, Kevan (January 15, 2019). Dianna Agron On Her Return To Cafe Carlyle. Build Series. Archived from the original on January 15, 2019 – via YouTube.
- Movieclips Classic Trailers (December 21, 2012). TKO (2007) Official Trailer # 1. Archived from the original on October 16, 2013 – via YouTube.
- Patel, Sangita (September 9, 2017). .@DiannaAgron talks her new film Novitiate & life after Glee at our lounge. ET Canada. Dianna Agron (interviewee), Khoros, LLC (social media promotion). Archived from the original on April 28, 2021 – via Twitter.
- ScreenSlam (November 3, 2017). Novitiate: Dianna Agron & Margaret Qualley Exclusive Interview. Dianna Agron, Margaret Qualley (interviewees). Archived from the original on October 1, 2020 – via YouTube.
- Smith, Drew (2019b). Genealogy Connection #063 – Jennifer Mendelsohn, Researcher, Writer, and Speaker from The Genealogy Guys Podcast & Genealogy Connection. Stitcher. Jennifer Mendelsohn (guest). Archived from the original on August 21, 2020.
- Variety Studio (February 5, 2017). 'Novitiate' Stars on the Lack of Stories About Women. Margaret Betts, Dianna Agron, Margaret Qualley, Morgan Saylor (interviewees). Variety. Archived from the original on February 2, 2021 – via YouTube.
- Weston, Roz (March 20, 2022). Dianna Agron On Working With First-Time Director Mayim Bialik In 'As They Made Us'. Entertainment Tonight Canada. Dianna Agron (interviewee). Archived from the original on March 27, 2022 – via YouTube.

=== Bibliography ===
- Agron, Dianna (April 21, 2011a). "The 2011 Time 100 - Chris Colfer". Time. ISSN 0040-781X. Archived from the original on October 11, 2013.
- Agron, Dianna (August 12, 2014). "'Glee' star: Youth deserve equal rights". MSNBC. Archived from the original on December 20, 2020.
- Agron, Dianna (January 1, 2015b). "Dianna Agron's Gstaad diary". Elle. Archived from the original on September 21, 2020.
- Agron, Dianna; Agron, Jason (February 13, 2014). "Exclusive Editorial: Diamond Dogs by Dianna Agron". Galore. Archived from the original on December 19, 2014.

=== Features ===
- 6 Degrees No Bacon (August 2, 2011). "Dianna Agron flaunts it". Jewish Telegraphic Agency. Archived from the original on September 21, 2020.
- Agron, Jason (July 8, 2016a). "Gia Coppola Celebrates Her Everlane Summer Capsule Collection in Hollywood". Vogue. Archived from the original on October 25, 2020.
- Aiello, Valeria (2012). "E' Gleeffoni film festival per Dianna Agron" [It's "Gleeffoni" film festival for Dianna Agron]. Recensito (in Italian). Archived from the original on June 2, 2021. "Dianna [Agron] ringrazia commossa la platea, ... Ritira il premio 'Giffoni Experience' | Dianna [Agron] thanked the audience, ... she collected the 'Giffoni Experience' award"
- Berk, Brett; Diehl, Jessica (October 2010). "Glee Whiz". Vanity Fair. Paola Kudacki. Archived from the original on February 14, 2015.
- Berkenwald, Leah (May 25, 2011). "Does cheerleading matter to Jewish women?". Jewish Women's Archive. Archived from the original on March 24, 2016.
- Bernard, Riese (November 27, 2018). "The Bisexual Bob: A Bold Haircut for a Beautiful Future". Autostraddle. Archived from the original on November 28, 2018.
- Brasor, Philip (April 30, 2016). "Idols put Band-Aids on fragile male egos". The Japan Times. Archived from the original on November 8, 2020.
- Brunner, Jeryl (January 29, 2019). "Dianna Agron on Making Music, Glee and Performing at Café Carlyle". Parade. Archived from the original on February 3, 2019.
- Buddemeyer, Ruby (December 4, 2017). "The 50 Most Expensive Celebrity Wedding Dresses of All Time". Marie Claire. Archived from the original on May 9, 2021.
- Calfee, Bailey (January 21, 2019). "Dianna Agron Wants To Do It All". Nylon. Archived from the original on January 23, 2019.
- Caramanica, Jon (April 8, 2010). "'Glee': Attitude, Yes, but Without a Song in Its Heart". The New York Times. ISSN 0362-4331. Archived from the original on October 16, 2020.
- Caspi (September 18, 2013). ""דיאנה אגרון: "לא רוצה להיות אסירה בגלל הפפראצי" [Dianna Agron: "I don't want to feel trapped by the paparazzi"]. Walla! (in Hebrew). Archived from the original on March 6, 2016.
- Catalli, Claudia (July 30, 2012). "Dianna Agron: 'Non avrei mai immaginato di diventare una star'" [Dianna Agron: 'I never imagined becoming a star']. Panorama (in Italian). Archived from the original on January 22, 2021. "Se i suoi idoli sono alto, 'Audrey Hepburn, Sofia Loren e Grace Kelly' in primis, il suo motto è 'andare avanti, senza farsi mai dire cosa fare dagli adulti'. Più un sano 'non arrend ersi mai', a seguito delle 'oltre trenta audizioni senza successo fatte pur di avere una particina in un musical. E invece niente, non mi prendevano mai. Ero a terra ho fatto il provino per Glee tanto per provare, e invece me hanno presa subito'. | If her idols are high ('Audrey Hepburn, Sofia Loren and Grace Kelly') above all, her motto is 'keep going, never be told what to do by adults'. And a healthy 'never give up', following the 'over thirty unsuccessful auditions done just to get a little part in a musical. But nothing, I didn't get it. I was on the ground so I auditioned for Glee just to try, and instead they took me right away'."
- Chilton, Louis (October 5, 2021). "Sarah Silverman criticises 'long tradition' of casting non-Jews in Jewish roles". The Independent. Archived from the original on October 5, 2021.
- Coppes, Vanessa (May 13, 2022). "Letter from the Editor-in-Chief: The Beauty of Pride 2022". BELLA Magazine. Archived from the original on May 31, 2022.
- de Croisset, Phoebe (October 11, 2017). "Dianna Agron talks music, falling in love, and her new film, Novitiate". SBJCT Journal. Archived from the original on October 16, 2017.
- Dabir, Marianne (September 16, 2013). "Dianna Agron vs. Demi Lovato: These Trendsetting Stars Pull off Pompadours". Teen Vogue. Archived from the original on July 11, 2021.
- Daunt, Tina (June 7, 2012). "President Obama Has Private Meeting with Young Stars at Beverly Hilton". The Hollywood Reporter. Archived from the original on October 26, 2012.
- Daunt, Tina (September 27, 2015). "Hillary Clinton Works to Boost Hollywood Ties at L.A. Fundraiser". The Hollywood Reporter. Archived from the original on April 16, 2019.
- Ellison, Moonah (April 15, 2019). "Dianna Agron". New York Moves Magazine. pp. 83–85. ISSN 1553-8710. Archived from the original on January 10, 2022 – via Issuu.
- Frick, Evelyn (April 4, 2022). "Dianna Agron Is Ready for Her Jewish Spotlight". Hey Alma. Archived from the original on April 8, 2022.
- Gilligan, Eilish (November 16, 2021). "All The Sneaky References And Easter Eggs In 'Red (Taylor's Version)'". Junkee. Archived from the original on November 16, 2021.
- Glancy, Josh (May 8, 2022). "Step Away From The Banjo". The Sunday Times Magazine. Archived from the original on May 8, 2022.
- Goldberg, Lesley (October 26, 2011). "'Glee's' 300th Musical Performance: Favorite Songs and Photos". The Hollywood Reporter.
- Goldberg, Lesley (April 10, 2012a). "'Glee's' Dianna Agron on Quinn's Accident and What's Next: Romance?". The Hollywood Reporter. Archived from the original on June 30, 2017.
- Goldberg, Carrie (October 18, 2016). "Dianna Agron's Stunning Wedding Gowns Were Well Worth Their 5-Figure Price Tags". Harper's Bazaar. Archived from the original on October 21, 2016.
- Gottlieb, Shoshana (June 3, 2022). "A Play-by-Play of Dianna Agron's Live Show, As Told by a Loyal Stan". Hey Alma. Archived from the original on June 3, 2022.
- Hartlaub, Peter (February 18, 2011). "Dianna Agron puts photography to use in 'Number Four'". Daily Herald. San Francisco Chronicle. Archived from the original on June 8, 2016.
- Hedegaard, Erik (May 20, 2011). "Glee Gone Wild: Rolling Stone's 2010 Cover Story". Rolling Stone. Archived from the original on March 8, 2018.
- Henderson, Jessica (April 12, 2011). "Get Your Gleek On!". Marie Claire. Archived from the original on December 24, 2014. "I sold my first screenplay six months before Glee, but they had the option for a year and now it's back with me. So I'd like to get that made. I wrote it during the writers strike when there weren't any auditions"
- Hogan, Heather (May 29, 2021). "What Is The Meaning of This Dianna Agron Gay Smooching Instagram Photo?!". Autostraddle. Archived from the original on June 23, 2021.
- Hopewell, John; Keslassy, Elsa (May 18, 2013). "Hot Markets Drive Biz". Variety. Archived from the original on October 16, 2017. "'Hollywood knows that EuropaCorp knows how to finance a movie. (And) we are well-known for taking young talent to the next level,' [CEO Christophe] Lambert said. He predicted thesp Dianna Agron's career will never be the same after Malavita"
- InStyle Staff (October 7, 2011). "Hottest fall hairstyles". CNN. Archived from the original on November 12, 2019.
- Jakle, Jeanne (February 6, 2011). ""Glee" star's dancing days began in S.A." San Antonio Express-News. San Francisco Chronicle. Archived from the original on October 16, 2020. "I finally [spoke with Agron], at a recent TV critics event, and learned that though she was born in Georgia, Agron spent most of her elementary school years [in San Antonio]. She attended Northwood in the North East Independent School District. ... The family relocated to San Francisco when she was 9."
- Johnson, Ted; Patten, Dominic (November 3, 2020). "Election Day In America: Hollywood & Millions More Vote As Polls Open Nationwide". Deadline. Archived from the original on November 3, 2020.
- Jones, C. T. (September 3, 2022). "Some Taylor Swift Stans Hunt For Clues to Queerness in Promos for New Album 'Midnights'". Rolling Stone. Archived from the original on September 12, 2022.
- Juanitas, Zoe (October 31, 2019). "How 3 Female Filmmakers Navigate the Industry". The Cut. Archived from the original on December 13, 2019.
- Keating, Shannon (October 11, 2017). "The Complicated Appeal Of Celesbian Gossip". BuzzFeed News. Archived from the original on October 12, 2017.
- Keck, William (April 10, 2012). "Dianna Agron Previews Quinn's Fate on Glee". TV Guide. Archived from the original on April 12, 2012.
- Krupnick, Ellie (May 11, 2011). "Victoria's Secret Models Rank Hollywood's Sexiest Lips, Curves And More". Huffington Post. Archived from the original on April 30, 2021.
- Lehava, Noah (October 23, 2017). "Dianna Agron Was Once Bullied for Her Faith". Coveteur. Archived from the original on October 3, 2019.
- Lewis, Isobel (October 21, 2019). "School's out: how Glee made fans stop believin'". The Guardian. ISSN 0261-3077. Archived from the original on July 20, 2020.
- Lobell, Kylie Ora (April 12, 2022). "Mayim Bialik on "As They Made Us," Her New Film and Directorial Debut". Jewish Journal. Archived from the original on April 12, 2022.
- Lodge, Guy (January 4, 2022). "Missing in action: this season's most overlooked movie performances". The Guardian. Archived from the original on March 26, 2022.
- Loiacono, Rita (January 9, 2015). "Glee and me: The heartbreaking demise of our love affair". SheKnows.com. Archived from the original on January 12, 2015. "I really hope Dianna Agron was provided with only the best medical treatment for the whiplash she surely suffered from having to play Quinn's multiple personalities. ... [Quinn] got herself into a car accident, lost the ability to walk, regained the ability to walk and didn't tell anybody, and finally forced herself out of the wheelchair in time to sing 'Take My Breath Away' with Santana at prom."
- Lubow, Arthur (May 1, 2023). "In the Studio with Harold Ancart". W Magazine.
- Maglente, Shanon (October 31, 2014). "Dianna Agron Smokey Eyes & Elegant Updo At UNICEF Masquerade Ball". Hollywood Life. Archived from the original on August 14, 2016. "Dianna Agron showed up at the 2nd Annual UNICEF Masquerade Ball in Los Angeles on October 30 with vintage-classic Hollywood glam."
- Manelis, Michele (March 2, 2011). "Dianna Agron is full of cheer". The New Zealand Herald. ISSN 1170-0777. Archived from the original on January 10, 2014.
- Marcus, Stephanie (August 2, 2011). "Dianna Agron Tells David Letterman She Had Her Nose Fixed". The Huffington Post. Archived from the original on January 4, 2013.
- McClintock, Pamela (November 16, 2013). "Disney's Smoking Ban Means No Puffing for Walt Disney in 'Saving Mr. Banks'". The Hollywood Reporter. Archived from the original on June 2, 2021. "Napa ... hosted its celebrity tribute Friday night, where [John Lee Hancock and Colin Farrell] were both honored, alongside rising stars Dianna Agron and Miles Teller."
- McIntyre, Hugh (January 9, 2015). "'Glee' Has More Chart Hits Than Anyone Else In History". Forbes. Archived from the original on December 14, 2015.
- Miller, Gerri (August 2009). "Glee Club Glory|". JVibe. Archived from the original on December 16, 2010.
- Millward, Tom (May 2015). "McQueen reviews from May 2015". London Theatre Guide. Archived from the original on October 16, 2020.
- Molony, Julia (November 15, 2013). "The Leisure List: From glee to psycho babe". Irish Independent. Archived from the original on October 16, 2020.
- Mooro, Alya (December 19, 2014). "Inside Our Trip To Gstaad With A Small World And Carey Mulligan". Grazia.
- Nathanson, Hannah (April 17, 2015). "Dianna Agron: 'The McQueen Savage exhibition took my breath away". Evening Standard. Archived from the original on April 14, 2019. "After my first audition for Glee the producers asked whether I could 'sex up my look'. It was like hearing nails on a chalkboard. 'Sexy' is a word I never equate with myself. When I was at high school ... I went through a rebellious punk stage in fishnets, acid-washed jeans and huge Skechers boots. I also dyed my hair red twice and both times it went orange. ... My mum was an amazing seamstress; she used to dress me in beautiful doll-style dresses with English smocking."
- Nordstrom, Leigh (November 2, 2017). "Dianna Agron Is Ready for Her Next Act". WWD. Archived from the original on October 16, 2020.
- O'Connell, Heather (October 12, 2013). "PopWrapped Chats With Artist, Performer And Life Researcher, Lexy Hulme". PopWrapped. Lexy Hulme (interviewee). Archived from the original on April 28, 2021.
- O'Neill, Alannah (January 19, 2011). "Elle Interview: Dianna Agron reigns supreme". Elle Canada. Archived from the original on February 2, 2021.
- Official London Theatre (June 3, 2015). "The Big Interview: Dianna Agron". Society of London Theatre. Archived from the original on September 30, 2020.
- Pearl, Sharrona (January 11, 2019). "Why We Don't Need Jewish Actors to Play Jewish Roles". Tablet. Archived from the original on September 24, 2020. "In a particular episode of Glee, Lea Michele's Jewish character was debating a nose job. She longed for the proboscis of the archetypal shiksa portrayed by Dianna Agron. Who is herself Jewish. Which, of course, doesn't matter at all. Jewishness is not immediately identifiable by looking at someone. This means that an actor's religious identity and ethnicity need and ought not be brought to bear on the roles they can play."
- Pearl, Sharrona (September 9, 2021). "A Baby at the Shiva". The Revealer. Archived from the original on September 9, 2021. "#actuallyJewish actress Dianna Agron, famous for her role as Quinn Fabray on Glee, has made a career playing shiksa princesses, a role she revives here with a wink of her perfectly naturally made-up eyes."
- Rafford, Claire; Rush, Mariah (September 4, 2020). "And that's what you missed: 'Glee' covers that belong on your playlists". The Observer. Archived from the original on October 7, 2020.
- Ryan, Tim (February 17, 2011). "Critics Consensus: Unknown's Plot Twists Too Much". Rotten Tomatoes. Archived from the original on August 30, 2017.
- Ryan, Tim (September 12, 2013). "Critics Consensus: Insidious: Chapter 2 is a So-So Frightfest". Rotten Tomatoes. Archived from the original on August 30, 2017. "The pundits say The Family boasts solid performances, but the actors can only do so much with a script that favors brutal violence over satirical wit."
- Sastry, Keertana (February 21, 2015). "Where's Quinn During The 'Glee' Wedding? Dianna Agron's Season 6 Appearance Is Clearly Limited". Bustle.
- Schilling, Dave (December 30, 2015). "Glee actor Mark Salling's arrest has me wondering, where are the cast now?". The Guardian. ISSN 0261-3077. Archived from the original on December 30, 2015.
- Schulte-Hillen, Sophie (February 22, 2016). "How Dianna Agron Gets a Street Style Beauty Staple Ready for the Front Row". Vogue. Archived from the original on June 28, 2019.
- Smoudianis, Leia; Tse, Chloe, eds. (May 27, 2016). "Glee's Dianna Agron speaks out against sexism at Women Deliver 2016". The Feminism Project. Archived from the original on June 2, 2016.
- Steiner, Amanda Michelle (March 16, 2015). "Glee Finale: Original Cast Auditions from Lea Michele, Cory Monteith and More". People. Archived from the original on August 7, 2017.
- Stern, Marlow (May 7, 2023). "Dianna Agron Has Come a Long Way From 'Glee'". Rolling Stone.
- Times Leader Staff (February 13, 2011). "Agron ventures into sci-fi with glee". Times Leader. Wilkes-Barre, Pennsylvania. p. 53. Archived from the original on May 24, 2021.
- Ward, Maria (April 22, 2017). "Chanel Celebrates Female Directors at the Annual Tribeca Film Festival Luncheon". Vogue. Archived from the original on April 26, 2017.
- Waterman, Lauren (January 11, 2010). "Dianna Agron". Interview. Archived from the original on December 9, 2019.
- Wells, Ira (May 28, 2015). "Forgetting Lolita: How Nabokov's Victim Became an American Fantasy". The New Republic. ISSN 0028-6583. Archived from the original on May 29, 2015.
- Wilcox, Molly (December 29, 2021). "Art World Couples We Can't Stop Watching". Culturedmag. Archived from the original on December 29, 2021.
- Yılmaz, Derin (April 7, 2021). "4 Old Hollywood Classics That Deserve a Remake -- And Who Should Star In Them!". Young Hollywood. Archived from the original on July 28, 2021.
- Zuckerman, Suzanne (January 28, 2010). "Dreaming Big: Dianna Agron of Glee". Women's Health. Archived from the original on March 28, 2010.

=== Interviews ===
- Abrams, Rachel; Sullivan, Michael (July 26, 2010). "A blast with the cast". Variety. Robert Ulrich, Mark Saks, Julie Tucker, Ross Meyerson, Jeff Greenberg (interviewees). Archived from the original on June 28, 2017.
- Alloway, Meredith (October 29, 2015). "Dianna Agron On Bare, Sexuality, And Her Riskiest Role Yet". Nylon. Dianna Agron (interviewee). Archived from the original on October 30, 2015.
- Bell, Crystal (November 15, 2012). "'Glee' Star Dianna Agron Talks Quinn's Thanksgiving Return, Kitty and Catfights With Santana". Celebuzz. Dianna Agron (interviewee). Archived from the original on November 17, 2012.
- Bellikoff, Sam (February 18, 2011). "Dianna Agron on Life, Glee, and the Paparazzi". Interview. Dianna Agron (interviewee). Archived from the original on February 2, 2021.
- Bergman, Randi (October 19, 2020). "Emma Seligman On Her Incredibly Jewy Debut Film 'Shiva Baby'". Hey Alma. Emma Seligman (interviewee).
- Edelsburg, Natan (September 21, 2017). "MSNBC and Musical.ly partner around the Global Citizen festival for behind the scenes action". Found Remote. Farra Kober (interviewee). Archived from the original on July 7, 2019.
- Fernández, Sandy M. (July 26, 2013). "Glee's Dianna Agron and Somaly Mam Foundation Are On a Mission to Stop Trafficking. Find Out How You Can Too!". InStyle. Dianna Agron (interviewee). Archived from the original on May 17, 2017.
- Galloway, Stephen (October 24, 2016). "How Fox Almost Said No to 'The People v. O.J. Simpson'". The Hollywood Reporter. Dana Walden (interviewee). Archived from the original on November 8, 2020. "Did anything change fundamentally from the [Glee] pilot? [Dana Walden, Fox Chair:] We added Dianna Agron. We added a popular girl into it, and we did some reshooting. Oh yeah, we added Jane [Lynch]."
- Gaynor, Emily (August 24, 2015). "Dianna Agron Reveals Her Secret To Looking Like She's Still in High School". Teen Vogue. Dianna Agron (interviewee). Archived from the original on September 4, 2017.
- Howland, Melissa (May 20, 2011). "Q&A interview Dianna Agron". We Are Movie Geeks. Dianna Agron (interviewee). Archived from the original on May 26, 2011. "I grew up watching and loving old-school actresses like Audrey Hepburn, Sophia Loren and Katharine Hepburn. ... How would you describe your personal sense of style? DIANNA: It's very eclectic. ... I also love dressing however I feel that day. One day, I might want to dress like a boy. Another day I might want to put on a pretty, vintage, girly teacup dress."
- Martin, Denise (March 14, 2013). "Glee's Naya Rivera on Angry Brittana Fans, Crazy Quinn, and Finn's Cardigans". Vulture. Naya Rivera (interviewee). Archived from the original on September 7, 2020.
- McLean, Craig (January 30, 2011). "How I make it work: Dianna Agron". The Sunday Times. Dianna Agron (interviewee). Archived from the original on September 27, 2013.
- Miller, Julie (January 27, 2011). "Dianna Agron Worked on Her High School Yearbook, and 4 Other Gleeful Revelations". Movieline. Dianna Agron (interviewee). Archived from the original on August 20, 2011.
- Radish, Christina (February 4, 2011). "Dianna Agron Interview I Am Number Four; Plus an Update on the Glee Super Bowl Episode". Collider. Dianna Agron (interviewee). Archived from the original on January 5, 2020.
- Wagner, Ursula (April 4, 2021). "Interview with Emma Seligman, Director of Shiva Baby". Jewschool. Emma Seligman (interviewee). Archived from the original on April 4, 2021.
- Weintraub, Steve (October 11, 2010). "Dianna Agron On Set Interview 'I Am Number Four'". Collider. Dianna Agron (interviewee). Archived from the original on January 29, 2013.
- Wightman, Catriona (September 14, 2011). "'Glee' Dianna Agron, Kevin McHale Q&A". Digital Spy. Dianna Agron, Kevin McHale (interviewees). Archived from the original on November 15, 2020. "Rocky Horror was my favourite. I loved that kind of stuff and fun makeup, extreme makeup, because usually it's just light and natural and simple. We kind of got to completely transform."
- Williamson, Sue (January 29, 2015). "Dianna Agron Loves Pilates, Great Mascara". W. Dianna Agron (interviewee). Archived from the original on October 1, 2020. "Your look: Eclectic yet sometimes quirky. It can switch from super feminine to masculine vey [sic] quickly."

=== Literature ===
- Greene, Sarah, ed. (2018). "Galas – Curating Character". New York City's Gilded Ages: Spaces and Places. New York City: Barnard College. Archived from the original on November 25, 2018.
- Halliday, Rebecca Pearl (November 20, 2017). The Live Fashion Show in Mediatized Consumer Culture. Communication & Culture (Thesis). Ryerson University (in association with). Toronto, Canada: York University. pp. 93–94. Archived (PDF) from the original on April 28, 2021.
- Huang, P.; Liu, H.; Chen, C.; Cheng, P. (2013). "The Impact of Social Diversity and Dynamic Influence Propagation for Identifying Influencers in Social Networks". 2013 IEEE/WIC/ACM International Joint Conferences on Web Intelligence (WI) and Intelligent Agent Technologies (IAT). Vol. 1. pp. 410–416. doi:10.1109/WI-IAT.2013.58. ISBN 978-0-7695-5145-6. S2CID 14934832.
- Malcolm, Shawna (May–June 2010). "Role Call". Emmy. Vol. XXXII, no. 3. North Hollywood, California: Academy of Television Arts & Sciences. p. 108. ISSN 0164-3495. OCLC 4629234.
- McDowell, Christina (2015). After Perfect: a daughter's memoir (First ed.). New York: Gallery Books. ISBN 978-1-4767-8532-5. OCLC 902852973.
- Museum of the Jewish People at Beit Hatfutsot (2020a). "Family tree of Shmuel Labe Agronsky 5343". Archived from the original on June 3, 2021.
- Museum of the Jewish People at Beit Hatfutsot (2020b). "Family tree of Shmuel Labe Agronsky 1325". Archived from the original on June 3, 2021.
- Museum of the Jewish People at Beit Hatfutsot (2020c). "Dianna Agron 5343". Archived from the original on October 16, 2020.
- Museum of the Jewish People at Beit Hatfutsot (2020d). "Personality: Ronald S. Agron". Archived from the original on June 3, 2021.
- Official Charts Company (February 21, 2010). "Official Singles Chart for the week ending 27 February 2010". UKChartsPlus. No. 444. Liverpool. pp. 1–4.
- Rosenman, Evan T.R. (2012). Retweets—but Not Just Retweets: Quantifying and Predicting Influence on Twitter (PDF) (Thesis). Cambridge, Massachusetts: Harvard. Archived (PDF) from the original on June 22, 2017.
- Rubin, Barney; Radford, Evelyn M. (2004). (Any Way Out) Eisberg Family: A Brief History and Genealogical Listing of the Eisberg Family in Kansas City, Missouri, Including Some of Their Agronsky Relatives, and Their Origins in Novgorod-Severskiy, Ukraine. Snyder, Henry Arnold. Danville, California: Pradbin Publishers. ISBN 0-9708316-4-1. OCLC 56758880.
- Schlepphorst, Amy (2014). 'Losing My Religion': An Examination of the Representation of Female Christian Characters on Television (PDF) (Thesis). College of Charleston. p. 26. Archived (PDF) from the original on April 28, 2021. "The majority of critics praised Quinn, applauding not only her acidic attitude, but her sweeter moments as well. ... Hankinson (2009), a television blogger for the Houston Chronicle, notes, 'As Quinn, she started so one-dimensional and has grown so much ever since. I love that she can keep her Mean Girls edge while being heartbreakingly sad or as joyful as she was singing Papa Don't Preach.'"
- Schwab, Katherine; Rose, Marice (2015). "Fishtail Braids and the Caryatid Hairstyling Project: Fashion Today and in Ancient Athens". Catwalk: The Journal of Fashion, Beauty, and Style. 4 (2). Fairfield, Connecticut: Fairfield University: 6–7. ISSN 2045-2349. Archived from the original on March 22, 2020.

=== News ===
- AfterEllen.com Staff (January 20, 2010). "The 1st Annual Lesbian/Bi People's Choice Awards Winners". AfterEllen. Archived from the original on January 23, 2010.
- AfterElton.com Staff (January 20, 2010). "The 2nd Annual Gay People's Choice Awards Winners". AfterElton. Archived from the original on January 27, 2010.
- Alcaraz, Macy (December 17, 2010). "Dianna Agron Writes, Directs, and Stars in Her Own Film". CandyMag.com. Summit Media. Archived from the original on October 7, 2020.
- Anderson, Claire (March 16, 2016). "'But our country does not know where to go to cry'". Irish Examiner. Archived from the original on October 29, 2020.
- Andreeva, Nellie (June 20, 2007). "Six actors join 'Heroes' lineup". Reuters. Archived from the original on January 15, 2016.
- Anth M. (November 24, 2009). "Gloriana thanks the fans again for their AMA, New Releases, Radio Disney loses the Tiffany Thornton and Kermit premiere to Macy's Thanksgiving Day Parade, I Kissed A Vampire to shoot six more episodes, Savvy and Mandy put Target and Walmart to the test". Tommy2.net. Archived from the original on June 20, 2010.
- Ausiello, Michael (November 19, 2012). "Exclusive Glee First Look: Quinn Comes 'Home'". TVLine. Archived from the original on March 10, 2016.
- Ausiello, Michael (December 5, 2013). "It's Official: Dianna Agron Returns to Glee". TVLine. Archived from the original on December 6, 2013.
- AZCentral Staff (July 7, 2015a). "Reports: Dianna Agron dating Wintson Marshall". The Arizona Republic.
- AZCentral Staff (April 9, 2015b). "Nicholas Hoult dating Dianna Agron". The Arizona Republic. Archived from the original on April 23, 2023.
- Bain, Becky (January 21, 2010). "'Glee' Star Dianna Agron Joins Christina Aguilera and Cher In 'Burlesque'". Idolator.
- Baird, Susanna (August 13, 2010). "Celebs Compete In 'Spelling Bee For Cheaters' To Benefit 826LA". HuffPost. AOL. Archived from the original on April 28, 2021.
- Barbour, Shannon (August 19, 2020). "Dianna Agron and Winston Marshall Broke Up After Three Years of Marriage". Cosmopolitan. Archived from the original on August 19, 2020.
- Barker, Lynn, ed. (June 13, 2011). "Dianna Agron Speaks Up for Gay Rights". TeenHollywood.com. Archived from the original on October 29, 2012.
- BBC News (March 20, 2015). "Glee star Dianna Agron to appear in McQueen play". BBC News Online. Archived from the original on February 5, 2018.
- Bell, Crystal (December 27, 2011). "Dianna Agron In 'The Hunters': 'Glee' Star's Thrilling New Role". Huffington Post. Archived from the original on January 10, 2012.
- Benson, Colleen (December 20, 1996). "People in Business 1996". San Francisco Chronicle. Archived from the original on October 16, 2020. "[In 1996] Hyatt Hotels & Resorts Western Division in San Francisco appointed Ron Agron general manager of the Hyatt Regency San Francisco Airport. He was with the Hyatt Regency San Antonio in a similar capacity."
- Bierly, Mandi (April 26, 2010). "TV Land Awards: 'Glee' honored as future classic on nostalgic night". Entertainment Weekly. Archived from the original on July 11, 2020.
- Blake, Meredith (December 12, 2012). "SAG award nominations: Cable dramas and network sitcoms dominate". Los Angeles Times. Archived from the original on January 22, 2013.
- Bloom, Nate (March 4, 2011). "Shayna punim alert, More on Dianna Agron ..." J. Archived from the original on October 16, 2020.
- Bonner, Mehera (February 20, 2013). "Dianna Agron Announces You, Me & Charlie's First Concert!". Wetpaint. Archived from the original on February 23, 2013.
- Boone, John (December 8, 2017). "Dianna Agron Is Dark and Gritty Like You've Never Seen Her Before in 'Hollow in the Land' Clip". Entertainment Tonight. Archived from the original on October 16, 2020.
- Boozer, Sean Michael; Econ, Brandon (February 22, 2014). "Young Storytellers Foundation: Glee Biggest Show". Archived from the original on February 28, 2014.
- BPI (January 13, 2011). "Nominees for 2011 BRIT Awards". Archived from the original on January 16, 2011.
- Brevet, Brad (March 27, 2011). "Amy Adams Cast as Lois Lane in Zack Snyder's 'Superman'". ComingSoon.net. Archived from the original on July 17, 2021.
- Bridson, Chris (December 9, 2014). "Gen. Dempsey spreads holiday joy". DVIDS. 4th Sustainment Brigade. Archived from the original on December 16, 2014.
- BroadwayWorld Movies News Desk (April 28, 2017). "16th Annual Tribeca Film Festival Announces Juried Awards". BroadwayWorld. Archived from the original on July 2, 2017.
- BroadwayWorld News (August 24, 2017). "Glee's Dianna Agron to Make Café Carlyle Debut Next Month". BroadwayWorld. Archived from the original on September 22, 2017.
- BroadwayWorld News Desk (September 29, 2019). "Photo Flash: Queen + Adam Lambert, Carole King, Alicia Keys, Kelly Clarkson, and More at the Global Citizen Festival". BroadwayWorld. Archived from the original on April 1, 2020.
- Buerger, Megan (August 10, 2014). "Exclusive Video Premiere: Watch Goldroom's 'Till Sunrise,' Directed by 'Glee' Star Dianna Agron". Billboard. Archived from the original on December 28, 2019.
- Casablanca, Ted (February 22, 2011). "Alex Pettyfer & Dianna Agron Split: What Went Wrong?". E! Online. Archived from the original on August 21, 2020.
- CBS News Staff (December 14, 2011). "Screen Actors Guild Awards 2012: Full list of nominees". CBS News. Archived from the original on June 26, 2018.
- CBS News Staff (June 5, 2012). "AMA 2010 Winners: The Full List". CBS News. Archived from the original on October 20, 2020.
- Cheesman, Neil (August 10, 2020). "Top stars support the 2020 Platform Presents Playwright's Prize". LondonTheatre. Archived from the original on September 23, 2020.
- Cheung, Nadine (March 21, 2012). "Tim Tebow Smitten by 'Glee' Star Dianna Agron". PopCrush. Archived from the original on March 23, 2012.
- Choo, Emily (December 12, 2011). "You, Me, and Charlie: Dianna Agron's New Online Art Collective". Autostraddle. Archived from the original on February 14, 2012.
- CSUN (July 7, 2008). "4th annual HollyShorts Film Festival August 7th!" (PDF) (Press release). Archived (PDF) from the original on November 18, 2021.
- Cummings, Tommy (February 27, 2023). "Here's last year's list of Dallas International Film Festival winners". Dallas News. Archived from the original on April 4, 2023.
- Dailey, Hannah (May 8, 2023). "Dianna Agron Finally Addresses Those Taylor Swift Dating Rumors". Billboard.
- David, Mark (March 31, 2016). "Engaged 'Glee' Star Dianna Agron Lists Hollywood Hills Bachelorette Pad". Variety. Archived from the original on September 28, 2017.
- Davidson, Danica (April 23, 2013). "Fans Honor Dianna Agron By Helping Her Shine Light On Human Trafficking". MTV Act. Archived from the original on October 16, 2013.
- Davis, Brendan (October 15, 2012). "Dianna Agron signs on as #SpiritDay Ambassador!". GLAAD. Archived from the original on October 18, 2012.
- DiStasio, Christine (September 10, 2014). "'Glee' Season 6 Brings Back More Original Stars & 7 More Bizarre Bits of News About the Final Season". Bustle.
- Dobuzinskis, Alex (January 24, 2010). "Factbox: List of winners at Screen Actors Guild Awards". Reuters. Archived from the original on December 15, 2018.
- Dodd, Stacy (July 2, 2007). "Dianna Agron, Dominic Keating". Variety. Archived from the original on July 5, 2007.
- Douglass, Beth (April 13, 2012). "Dianna Agron Grew Up Living in a Hotel". Wetpaint. Archived from the original on January 12, 2015.
- Dowd, Katie (September 2, 2018). "Celebrities you might not have known lived in the Bay Area". SFGate. Archived from the original on October 16, 2020.
- Evans, Greg (October 22, 2018). "Tribeca's Through Her Lens Awards $80,000 Grant To Filmmaker Suha Araj". Deadline. Archived from the original on October 22, 2018.
- Fiallo, Josh (July 12, 2022). "Anna Wintour Apparently Set Up New Lovebirds Bradley Cooper and Huma Abedin". The Daily Beast. Archived from the original on July 13, 2022.
- Fisher, Kendall (February 23, 2016). "Dianna Agron Finally Shows Off Her Gorgeous Engagement Ring for the First Time". E! Online. Archived from the original on February 23, 2016.
- Fleming, Mike Jr. (October 2, 2010). "'Spider-Man' Update: Emma Stone To Be Offered Role Of Mary Jane Watson". Deadline. Archived from the original on August 5, 2014.
- Fuller, Bonnie (January 20, 2010). "HollyLesson! 'Glee' Star Dianna Agron Tweets How to Pronounce Her Name". Hollywood Life. Archived from the original on September 22, 2013. "'Say Hey-gron but then take away the H. :),' Dianna tweeted to a fan Jan. 19. 'I'm half Russian. It was Agronsky before Ellis Island chopped it.'"
- Furness, Hannah (November 20, 2014). "A-listers assemble for largest charity singalong of John Lennon's Imagine". The Telegraph. Archived from the original on December 23, 2015.
- Gallagher, Brian (October 1, 2010). "'Spider-Man Reboot' Eyeing Dianna Agron for Gwen Stacy". MovieWeb. Archived from the original on June 27, 2015.
- Gilman, Greg (August 4, 2014). "Dianna Agron Joins Jason Sudeikis, Rebecca Hall Rom-Com 'Tumbledown'". TheWrap. Archived from the original on December 1, 2018.
- Ginsberg, Merle (May 4, 2015). "Met Gala: Dianna Agron, Melanie Laurent and Maggie Q to Wear Custom Tory Burch Gowns". The Hollywood Reporter.
- Glassman, Emily (December 20, 2011). "IMDb Announces Top 10 Stars of 2011". Business Wire. Archived from the original on July 27, 2021.
- Goldberg, Lesley (March 15, 2012b). "'Glee's' Naya Rivera, Cory Monteith, Dianna Agron to Host GLAAD Awards". The Hollywood Reporter. Archived from the original on March 16, 2012.
- Gold Derby Admin (March 7, 2016). "2010 GoldDerby TV Awards". Gold Derby. Archived from the original on January 4, 2018.
- Gregory, Jenna (December 12, 2011). "Dianna Agron and Sebastian Stan split". Marie Claire. Archived from the original on August 21, 2020.
- Gutierrez, Lisa (June 21, 2014). "Jason Sudeikis, Paul Rudd, Rob Riggle and David Koechner: Homegrown celebrities kick off Big Slick". The Kansas City Star. Archived from the original on June 24, 2014.
- Hammel, Sara (March 25, 2012). "John Stamos, Naya Rivera & Cory Monteith's Three-Way Smooch". People. Archived from the original on March 26, 2012.
- Hampp, Andrew; Brown, Harley (September 28, 2014). "Global Citizen Festival 2014: Beyonce Duets With Jay Z, Sting Joins No Doubt & 8 More Highlights". Billboard. Archived from the original on September 28, 2014.
- Harrison, Lily (October 16, 2016). "Dianna Agron Marries Mumford and Sons' Winston Marshall". E! Online. Archived from the original on August 21, 2020.
- Hautman, Nicholas (August 10, 2020). "Glee's Dianna Agron and Mumford & Sons' Winston Marshall Split After 3 Years of Marriage". Us Weekly. Archived from the original on August 20, 2020.
- Hewis, Ben (July 17, 2015). "West End transfer announced for McQueen". What's On Stage. Archived from the original on August 11, 2015.
- Huffington Post Entertainment Staff (June 29, 2011). "Teen Choice Awards 2011 Nominees Announced: Harry Potter vs Twilight". The Huffington Post. Archived from the original on March 4, 2016.
- In Touch Staff (April 7, 2011). "Glee Star Dianna Agron's Hot New Man". In Touch Weekly. Archived from the original on June 24, 2015.
- Inquirer News Staff (February 12, 2011). "'Glee' cast gets Grammy music nom". The Philadelphia Inquirer. Archived from the original on October 7, 2020.
- Jagernauth, Kevin (March 31, 2011). "Imogen Poots, Felicity Jones, Caleb Landry-Jones, Dianna Agron & More Test For 'The Seventh Son'". IndieWire. Archived from the original on January 17, 2021.
- Johnson, Zach (April 13, 2012). "Dianna Agron and Tim Tebow Deny Love Triangle With Taylor Swift". Us Weekly. Archived from the original on February 3, 2017.
- Kallon, Catherine (August 16, 2010). "Breakthrough Of The Year Awards – Dianna Agron In Carolina Herrera". Red Carpet Fashion Awards. Archived from the original on December 7, 2011.
- Kazakina, Katya (September 23, 2022). "Why Do Artists Leave Their Galleries? It's About Money—and a Whole Lot More". Artnet News. Archived from the original on September 26, 2022.
- Keaney, Quinn (June 13, 2016). "Dianna Agron". PopSugar. Archived from the original on April 23, 2021.
- Kennedy, John R (March 17, 2020). "Drake Tops 'Glee' Cast For Most Entries On Hot 100 Chart". iHeart Radio. Archived from the original on October 23, 2020.
- Kennedy, Lisa (April 7, 2022). "'As They Made Us' Review: If the Apple Falls, Who Retrieves It?". The New York Times. Archived from the original on April 7, 2022.
- Kilday, Gregg (April 9, 2007). "'Irish' shines for Method". The Hollywood Reporter. Associated Press.
- Kit, Borys (July 13, 2012). "Dianna Agron Playing De Niro's Daughter in Luc Besson's 'Malavita'". The Hollywood Reporter. Archived from the original on July 15, 2012.
- Knox, David (August 16, 2010). "Kids' Choice Awards: 2010 Nominees". TV Tonight. Archived from the original on August 20, 2010.
- Kokshanian, Rita (September 1, 2015). "Tory Burch and Dianna Agron Team Up for Paris-Inspired Short Film". InStyle. Archived from the original on September 6, 2015.
- Kroll, Justin (March 31, 2011). "Young Hollywood lines up for 'Seventh Son'". Variety. Archived from the original on April 11, 2016.
- Lee, Ben (March 3, 2011). "Alex Pettyfer 'has become a liability'". Digital Spy. Archived from the original on November 4, 2020.
- Los AnJealous (February 24, 2010). "'Mamacita' by The Peeps Leading Donations for 826LA's Chickens In Love Benefit Album". Archived from the original on February 28, 2010.
- Lyons Powell, Hannah (February 17, 2012). "Dianna Agron and Sebastian Stan back on". Glamour UK. Archived from the original on August 21, 2020.
- McDowell, Maghan (November 8, 2013). "Burlingame native Dianna Agron back in area for Napa Valley Film Festival". San Francisco Chronicle. Archived from the original on February 4, 2014.
- McNary, Dave (April 22, 2015). "Documentary 'Unity' Set for Aug. 12 Release with 100 Star Narrators". Variety. Archived from the original on September 1, 2015.
- Merrill, Amy (February 21, 2013). "Dianna Agron visits Somaly's centers". Somaly Mam Foundation. Archived from the original on March 1, 2013.
- Milet, Sandrine (June 28, 2010). "Teen Choice Awards 2010: Second (Giant) Wave Of Nominees Announced!". MTV News. Viacom. Archived from the original on July 3, 2010.
- Miller, Gregory E. (September 1, 2013). "Dianna Agron Doesn't Know if She'll Be in 'Glee' Tribute Episode". ET Canada. Archived from the original on April 28, 2021.
- Molina, Thatiane (January 12, 2013). "Confira a lista de pré-indicados ao 5th Annual Shorty Awards!" [Learn the list of nominees for the 5th Annual Shorty Awards!]. Febre Teen (in Brazilian Portuguese). Archived from the original on October 16, 2020.
- Moore, Frazier (May 14, 2007). "American Eagle ad campaign features actors in mini films". St. Cloud Times. Associated Press. p. 3. Archived from the original on May 24, 2021. "It involves twentysomethings who work in a mall, including Harper (played by Dianna Agron, 21, who appeared on 'Shark' and 'CSI: New York') as an American Eagle sales clerk"
- Moore, Catherine (March 7, 2013b). "San Francisco Power of Choice Luncheon". NARAL Pro-Choice America. Archived from the original on March 10, 2013.
- MovieWeb Staff (February 1, 2011). "'Superman' Eyeing Jessica Biel and Rachel McAdams for Lois Lane". MovieWeb. Archived from the original on November 1, 2020.
- MTV News Staff (July 22, 2012). "Teen Choice Awards 2012: Complete Winners List". MTV. Archived from the original on July 2, 2015.
- Nededog, Jethro (June 28, 2013). "'Glee' Cast Shakeup: 5 Original Cast Members Out (Updated)". TheWrap. Archived from the original on August 9, 2020. "Original cast members Dianna Agron [and others] won't be returning as next [fifth] season, though they may make guest appearances ... Agron was not a series regular on Season 4."
- Neghyef, Nadia (December 30, 2011). "Glee saison 3: Quinn reprend 'Never Can say Goodbye' (Jackson 5)" [Glee season 3: Quinn will sing 'Never Can Say Goodbye' (Jackson 5)]. Melty.fr (in French). Archived from the original on February 5, 2022.
- O'Donoghue, Natalie (November 2, 2015). "BWW: UK Awards 2015 Update – Natalie O'Donoghue's Picks!". BroadwayWorld. Archived from the original on October 16, 2020.
- O'Hare, Kate (December 19, 2009). "Dave Franco 'Scrubs' in for ABC". The Daily Chronicle. DeKalb, Illinois. Associated Press. p. 2. Archived from the original on December 12, 2025. "[Dave Franco] Producer cred: 'A Fuchsia Elephant,' written and directed by Dianna Agron"
- Pannacione, Maggie (October 10, 2013). "'Glee' Star Dianna Agron Supports Camp Wonder + Cetaphil Initiative". Relativity Media. Archived from the original on October 23, 2013.
- Parvizi, Lauren (September 2, 2011a). "Dianna Agron opens up about troubled past". SFGate. Archived from the original on September 11, 2015.
- Parvizi, Lauren (February 28, 2011b). "Dianna Agron 'moving on with Chris Evans'". San Francisco Chronicle. Archived from the original on October 16, 2020.
- Paskin, Willa (October 21, 2010). "Dianna Agron Apologizes for GQ Photo Shoot". Vulture. Archived from the original on October 20, 2018.
- Rabinowitz, Chloe (March 5, 2024). "Dianna Agron to Return to Café Carlyle in April". BroadwayWorld.
- Ramachandran, Naman (October 8, 2021). "Evolution Mallorca Film Festival Reveals Line-Up for In-Person 10th Edition". Variety. Archived from the original on February 5, 2022.
- Rose, Lacey (December 20, 2011). "Natalie Portman Tops IMDB's Most Viewed Actors List". The Hollywood Reporter. Archived from the original on July 27, 2021.
- Rosen, Christopher (August 18, 2010). "Dianna Agron on 'The Romantics' and Her Dream Role". Wetpaint. Archived from the original on May 26, 2013.
- Sanchez, Chelsey (July 12, 2022). "Bradley Cooper Has Been Quietly Dating Huma Abedin for the Past Few Months". Harper's BAZAAR. Archived from the original on July 13, 2022.
- Schillaci, Sophie (December 8, 2011). "Dianna Agron to Launch 'Art-Based' Website; Reveals That Her 'Glee' Character Was Nearly 'Scrapped'". The Hollywood Reporter. Archived from the original on January 13, 2021.
- Setoodeh, Ramin (December 4, 2015). "Melissa Leo, Dianna Agron to Star in Nun Drama 'Novitiate'". Variety. Archived from the original on January 10, 2016.
- Shoka (February 24, 2011). "Animal-liberation terror – The V Word". Sacramento News & Review. Archived from the original on September 24, 2020.
- Snarker, Dorothy (June 4, 2012). "'Glee''s Dianna Agron hosts the GLAAD Media Awards in San Francisco". AfterEllen. Archived from the original on August 3, 2016.
- Soll, Lindsay (June 14, 2010). "Teen Choice Awards 2010: First Round Of Nominees Announced". MTV News. Archived from the original on May 4, 2016.
- Soriano, Eli (March 25, 2012). "Bro. Eli Soriano Makes It To Shorty Awards Final Six". EliSoriano.com. Archived from the original on October 16, 2020. "This year, Bro. Eli is competing with notable bloggers [in the final six:] Motivator Super, Harry Hitchens, Thread of Pangeran, Gabriel, and Glee star Dianna Agron."
- Stanciu, Mariana (August 15, 2010). "Breakthrough of the Year Awards 2010". Official Website of the Breakthrough of the Year Awards. Hollywood Life. Archived from the original on August 19, 2010. "Most well known for her portrayal of Quinn Fabray in the smash hit TV series Glee, Dianna Agron has become a household name. With a Screen Actors Guild Award, a Golden Globe, and most recently, 19 Emmy nominations for the show, her career is set to climb to even greater heights. The 2010 Breakthrough of the Year is presented to Dianna Agron, one of today's most exciting newcomers on stage and screen."
- SuperHeroHype (October 5, 2010). "Confirmed! Emma Stone to Play Gwen Stacy in Spider-Man!". CraveOnline. Archived from the original on May 10, 2012.
- Team Cambio (December 13, 2010). "Dianna Agron's Short Film 'A Fuchsia Elephant' In High Demand". Cambio. Archived from the original on February 24, 2013.
- Teran, Andi (December 5, 2011). "Darren Criss, Dianna Agron, And Kevin McHale Take 'Glee'-ful Fashion Risks At Trevor Live!". MTV News. Archived from the original on July 18, 2021.
- Thomas, Phyllis (November 1, 2009). "The Glee Cast Sings National Anthem at the World Series Game". TVMusic Network.
- Truong, Kimberly (November 11, 2019). "Meghan Markle Shared a Throwback Photo with a Glee Star and an American Idol Alum". InStyle. Archived from the original on November 12, 2019.
- Uproxx Staff (December 9, 2013). "Women Film Critics Circle falls for 'Augustine,' 'Enough Said' and 'Winnie Mandela'". Uproxx. Archived from the original on October 31, 2020.
- Vilensky, Mike (December 11, 2010). "Breaking: Tonsillitis Strikes Glee Cast". Vulture. Archived from the original on May 3, 2015.
- Vine, Hannah (September 20, 2017). "See Glee Star Dianna Agron Perform at Café Carlyle". Playbill. Archived from the original on September 21, 2017. "Agron, who grew up appearing in local musicals in Texas and California"
- Werde, Bill, ed. (February 18, 2012). "Bubbling Under Hot 100 Singles Chart: February 18, 2012". Billboard. Archived from the original on July 18, 2019.
- Wildermuth, John (June 6, 1997). "100 Years of Graduates At Palo Alto High School". San Francisco Chronicle. Archived from the original on October 16, 2020. "Writing winners [included] Dianna Agron, a fifth-grader from Lincoln [School in Burlingame.]"
- Young, Eleanor (February 23, 2011a). "Dianna Agron 'terrified' of Alex Pettyfer after split". Marie Claire. Archived from the original on July 1, 2018.
- Young, Eleanor (June 14, 2011b). "Dianna Agron dating Sebastian Stan?". Marie Claire. Archived from the original on August 21, 2020.

=== Reviews ===
- Albert, Melissa (November 30, 2012). "'Glee' Recap: 'Thanksgiving'". MTV News. Archived from the original on April 11, 2022. "In honor of Quinn's easy-listening vocals, they go into Motown mode"
- Arispe, Joshua (October 15, 2020). "Shiva Baby: A Short Film's Evolution Into One of The Year's Best Indies". Loud And Clear Reviews. Archived from the original on November 1, 2020.
- Bailey, Jason (April 8, 2021). "'Shiva Baby' Review: It's Complicated". The New York Times. ISSN 0362-4331. Archived from the original on May 7, 2021.
- Bayley, Leanne (August 1, 2014). "Dianna Agron Sam Smith music video – I'm Not The Only One". Glamour UK. Archived from the original on August 2, 2014.
- Berkshire, Geoff (January 28, 2015). "Sundance Film Review: 'Zipper'". Variety. Archived from the original on January 30, 2015.
- Bernard, Riese (December 2, 2011). "Glee 307 Recap: I Kissed A Girl, Allegedly". Autostraddle. Archived from the original on August 10, 2020. "whatever enigmatic plotstravangza the writers gifted Dianna Agron this week"
- Brannigan Lynch, Joseph (February 1, 2012). "'Glee' recap: An 'Off the Wall' Tribute to MJ". Entertainment Weekly. Archived from the original on February 4, 2012.
- Castillo, Monica (December 7, 2017). "Review: In 'Hollow in the Land,' a Headstrong Woman's Search for Answers". The New York Times. ISSN 0362-4331. Archived from the original on January 23, 2018.
- Chaney, Jen (January 31, 2012). "'Glee' by the musical numbers: Maxing out on Michael Jackson". The Washington Post. Archived from the original on February 2, 2012.
- Chang, Justin (January 21, 2017). "Commentary: Sundance: 'Landline' doesn't connect, but 'Novitiate' is worthy of praise". Los Angeles Times. Archived from the original on November 12, 2020.
- Clements, Sara (October 5, 2017). "EIFF: 'Novitiate' is an Ambitious Take on Isolation in a Life Devoted to God". Enthuse – Arts & Entertainment reviews and editorials. Archived from the original on September 21, 2020.
- Cohen, Anne (September 14, 2020). "Sex, Death & Lox: Shiva Baby Is An Instant Coming-Of-Age Classic". Refinery29. Archived from the original on September 19, 2020.
- Cooper, Jackie K. (February 10, 2019). "'Berlin, I Love You' Fails To Live Up To Its Title". Jackie K Cooper. Archived from the original on February 5, 2022. "It is difficult to understand how you and have ten different stories in an anthology and not one of them is entertaining. Some come close (take a bow Jenna Dewan and Diana Agron) [sic]}"
- Cortez, Carl (September 28, 2011). "TV Review: Glee - Season 3 - 'I Am Unicorn'". Assignment X. Archived from the original on October 2, 2011. "Quinn (Dianna Agron) has been on is going. As leader of the Skanks she's changed her hair color, her voice"
- Debruge, Peter (February 9, 2019). "Film Review: 'Berlin, I Love You'". Variety. Archived from the original on October 6, 2020.
- DeMara, Bruce (January 25, 2018). "Review | Hollow in the Land a gritty mystery in B.C. pulp town". Toronto Star. Archived from the original on September 13, 2019. "Comparisons to Winter's Bone (2010) are somewhat apt both in the sinewy tale peopled by low-life characters and a similarly intrepid heroine."
- de Moraes, Lisa (April 27, 2011). "Supersized 'Glee': We watch so you don't have to". The Washington Post. Archived from the original on October 7, 2020.
- Elliott, David (October 6, 2007). "Jokes, crassness at ramming speed". San Diego Union-Tribune. Archived from the original on January 4, 2015.
- Frederick, Candice (February 5, 2019). "'Berlin, I Love You' Film Review: Latest City-Based Anthology Is a Deutsch Dud". TheWrap. Archived from the original on March 15, 2020.
- Friedwald, Will (September 20, 2017). "Dianna Agron at Cafe Carlyle NYC - New York City Article - Citiview Travel Guide". NYC Citiview. Archived from the original on February 9, 2018.
- Frisby, Troy (January 29, 2019). "BWW Review: Dianna Agron Nails the Songs But Loses the Thread at Cafe Carlyle". BroadwayWorld. Archived from the original on September 24, 2020.
- Frosch, Jon (April 6, 2020). "'Shiva Baby': Film Review | SXSW 2020". The Hollywood Reporter. Archived from the original on September 17, 2020.
- Futterman, Erica (April 27, 2011). "'Glee' Recap: Everyone's Proud to be 'Born This Way'". Rolling Stone. Archived from the original on April 15, 2019.
- Futterman, Erica (February 1, 2012a). "'Glee' Recap: A Tribute Worthy of a King". Rolling Stone. Wenner Media LLC. Archived from the original on February 4, 2012.
- Futterman, Erica (April 11, 2012b). "'Glee' Recap: Somebody That I Used to Know". Rolling Stone.
- Gorber, Jason (September 11, 2020). "'Shiva Baby' Review: A Filmmaking Debut That is Lox, Stock and Barrel [TIFF 2020]". /Film. Archived from the original on September 16, 2020.
- Grimm, Eric J. (September 20, 2017). "Music Review: Dianna Agron breaks loose at Cafe Carlyle with Gill Landry". Theater Pizzazz. Archived from the original on May 31, 2018.
- Grow, Kory (November 25, 2013). "The Killers Feature 'Glee' Star in 'Just Another Girl'". Rolling Stone. Archived from the original on November 28, 2013.
- Hagen, Paul (September 21, 2017). "Dianna Agron Trades Glee-ful Energy for Dylan Cool at Cafe Carlyle". Metrosource. Archived from the original on October 1, 2019. "'For years I was on a TV show where I sang high all the time,' Dianna Agron tells the crowd at the Cafe Carlyle — referring to her years playing Quinn Fabray on Glee). 'It was kind of my fault, since I spoke high in the audition because we were supposed to be teenagers.' ... [She] reveals herself to be more a creature of folk-country cool than teeny-bopper pop. ... [Landry] sings with the resonance of country music legends"
- Hernandez, Melody Darlene (February 28, 2013). "YM&C Concert Recap!". You, Me and Charlie. Archived from the original on March 2, 2013.
- Hoffman, Lauren (April 11, 2012a). "Glee Recap: Your Moves Lacked a Theme". Vulture. Archived from the original on August 2, 2017.
- Hoffman, Lauren (November 30, 2012b). "Glee Recap: Just Sing Gibberish". Vulture. Archived from the original on December 2, 2012.
- Honeycutt, Kirk (February 16, 2011). "I Am Number Four: Review". The Hollywood Reporter. Archived from the original on April 16, 2019.
- Jacoby, Cortland (April 10, 2022). "Review: 'As They Made Us'". Punch Drunk Critics. "Dianna Agron carries most of the film, giving a quiet and grounded performance unlike we've seen from her in the past. Known mainly for her role on Glee, the 35-year-old has been taking more and more interesting roles, stepping away from the teeny-bopper TV show with choices like the unnervingly brilliant Shiva Baby and The Laureate."
- Kenny, Glenn (January 21, 2022). "The Laureate movie review & film summary (2022)". RogerEbert.com. Archived from the original on January 21, 2022.
- Kit, Zorianna (September 14, 2013). "Just Seen It: The Family Movie Review". The Huffington Post. Archived from the original on September 18, 2013. "We all agreed on the acting. De Niro, Pfeiffer and Jones all brought 100% to their roles. Glee actress Dianna Agron was the stand-out here, shining as the daughter who was falling in love for the first time, while defending her family from total annihilation by the mafia."
- Kliszus, Edward (March 30, 2022). "Dianna Agron at Café Carlyle NY". The Front Row Center. Archived from the original on March 31, 2022.
- Laffly, Tomris (September 14, 2020). "'Shiva Baby' Review: A Fast, Tightly Choreographed Farce with Confidently Sharp Jewish Humor". Variety. Archived from the original on September 15, 2020.
- LaSalle, Mick (November 3, 2017). "'Novitiate' a great acting vehicle". San Francisco Chronicle. Archived from the original on January 26, 2021.
- Linder, Brian (November 4, 2009a). "Glee: The Music – Vol. 1 Review". IGN. Archived from the original on January 19, 2011.
- Linder, Brian (December 8, 2009b). "Glee: The Music, Vol. 2 Review". IGN. Archived from the original on October 16, 2013.
- Lindsey, Craig D. (December 6, 2017). "Grungy Backwoods Thriller 'Hollow in the Land' Is Derivative and Uninspired". The Village Voice. Archived from the original on December 25, 2017. "Prediction: This will not be Dianna Agron's 'Winter's Bone'"
- Lodge, Guy (January 21, 2017). "Film Review: 'Novitiate'". Variety. Archived from the original on January 21, 2017.
- Malcom, Shawna (September 10, 2009). "'Glee': Please don't stop the music". Los Angeles Times. Archived from the original on March 4, 2016.
- McKenney, Bree (February 8, 2012). "Me & You, Me & Charlie". Vanity Fair. Archived from the original on December 16, 2014.
- Mecca, Dan (April 7, 2022). "As They Made Us Review: Dramedy Offers No Easy Answers in Death, But a Modicum of Peace". "Agron puts in quality work as the lead. She's been on quite a run between this [As They Made Us], The Laureate, and last year's Shiva Baby."
- Milzoff, Rebecca (2009). "Ranking the Songs on the New Glee Soundtrack!". Vulture. Archived from the original on February 5, 2022.
- Mishra, Shrishty (September 24, 2022). "Tenoch Huerta and Dianna Agron Preview Mark Millar's 'El Elegido' Adaptation". Collider.
- Mosher, Stephen (March 31, 2022). "BWW Review: Dianna Agron Takes Café Carlyle Audience Back To An Elegant, Sophisticated Era". BroadwayWorld. Archived from the original on March 31, 2022.
- Murray, Noel (December 7, 2017). "Review: 'Hollow in the Land' has a winning similarity to 'Winter's Bone'". Los Angeles Times.
- Olsen, Mark (September 12, 2013). "Movie review: 'The Family's' mob story has hits and misses". Los Angeles Times. Archived from the original on February 2, 2015. "And while De Niro and Pfeiffer make their way through the story's paces well enough, it's actually 'Glee's' Agron who makes a surprising impression, sliding from the innocent ingénue to manipulative murderess with ease."
- Puchko, Kristy (March 25, 2020). "'Shiva Baby' Delivers A Hilarious Symphony Of Tension And Humiliation-Based Comedy [Review]". The Playlist. Archived from the original on June 16, 2020.
- Rich, Katey (May 27, 2016). "I Am Number Four". CinemaBlend. Archived from the original on December 22, 2017.
- Robey, Tim (August 18, 2011). "Glee: The 3D Concert Movie". The Telegraph. Archived from the original on August 19, 2011.
- Scheck, Frank (December 7, 2017). "'Hollow in the Land': Film Review". The Hollywood Reporter. Archived from the original on June 3, 2020.
- Shetler, Scott (April 26, 2011). "'Glee' Cast (Rachel & Quinn), 'I Feel Pretty / Unpretty' – Song Review". PopCrush. Archived from the original on December 4, 2011.
- Slezak, Michael (January 31, 2012). "Glee Recap: A Thriller of a Night!". TVLine. Archived from the original on February 5, 2012.
- Smith, Matt (January 28, 2019a). "Dianna Agron Plays Café Carlyle". Theater Pizzazz. Archived from the original on October 16, 2020.
- Sobczynski, Peter (February 8, 2019). "Berlin, I Love You movie review (2019)". RogerEbert.com. Archived from the original on April 13, 2021.
- Stanhope, Kate (January 31, 2012). "Glee's Promising Road to Graduation Begins". TV Guide. Archived from the original on July 15, 2021 – via Yahoo!.
- Stephens, Samantha (September 21, 2011). "'Glee': Kurt and Rachel share the spotlight in season premiere". The Republican – via MassLive. "Quinn is just as much a stranger as she was when her name was Lucy. Even her voice is different"
- St. James, Emily (September 9, 2009). "Glee: 'Showmance'". The A.V. Club. Archived from the original on January 5, 2021.
- St. James, Emily (February 8, 2011a). "Glee: 'Silly Love Songs'". The A.V. Club. Archived from the original on November 16, 2019.
- St. James, Emily (December 7, 2011b). "Glee: 'Hold On To Sixteen'". The A.V. Club. Archived from the original on March 14, 2021. "'If everyone plays their cards right, there could be a really nice ... few weeks ... of strong, dramatic material to play here, particularly given how under-served Diann ... Quinn has been in the past. We might even be talking an Emm ... Ohio student-theatre award nomination.' Mr. Berry #2 shook his head. 'Oh, Rachel's just going to be really nice to her. We think that will take care of it. It'll probably clear up all of those remaining and unresolved issues ...'"
- St. James, Emily (February 1, 2012a). "Glee: 'Michael'". The A.V. Club. Archived from the original on March 14, 2021.
- St. James, Emily (April 11, 2012b). "Glee: 'Big Brother'". The A.V. Club. Archived from the original on November 16, 2019.
- Warman, Jonathan (January 26, 2019). "Review: Dianna Agron (2)". Drama Queen. Archived from the original on September 24, 2020. "'High-falutin' honky-tonk' – that's my 'elevator pitch' for Diana Agron's [sic] current cabaret act at the Café Carlyle. ... Her own musical aesthetic lines up less with Glee, and more with the style of her husband's band [Mumford & Sons]. [She] is nowhere more comfortable than when she's singing a cover of a 1960s folk rock chestnut or 1950s standard. ... The job in cabaret, as much as in theatre and film, is storytelling, and Agron is getting better at doing that"
- Warman, Jonathan (April 2, 2022). "Review: Dianna Agron (3)". Drama Queen. Archived from the original on April 2, 2022. "Folk rock, the meat of Agron's first two shows at the Carlyle, is largely absent here, replaced by "songbook" and "soul," both of which she excels at."
- Wheeler, Brad (January 25, 2018). "Review: Hollow in the Land features Glee's Dianna Agron on a blue-collar Nancy Drew mission". The Globe and Mail. Archived from the original on March 15, 2018. "A country-noir thriller in the vein of Debra Granik's Winter's Bone"
- White, Meghan (September 11, 2020). "TIFF Review: 'Shiva Baby'". AwardsWatch. Archived from the original on September 24, 2020.
- Wightman, Catriona (August 9, 2012). "'The Glee Project': 'Actability' recap". Digital Spy. Archived from the original on April 28, 2021.
- Wilner, Norman (January 25, 2018). "Hollow In The Land is a hollow Winters Bone knockoff". Now. Archived from the original on January 29, 2018.

=== Web ===
- αcharts (June 20, 2010). "Glee Cast - It's A Man's, Man's Man's World". αCharts. Archived from the original on August 13, 2011.
- 826LA Staff (January 31, 2012). "Flourish in February: we're planning on enjoying a month with CiL, Dianna Agron, and Valentine's Day poetry!". 826LA. Archived from the original on May 24, 2021.
- A&E (2013). "Dianna Agron.biography". Biography. A&E. Archived from the original on September 11, 2013.
- Agron, Dianna (December 12, 2011b). "About Charlie". You, Me & Charlie. Archived from the original on July 12, 2012.
- Agron, Dianna (October 13, 2012). "This scene goes down as one of my new favorites". Twitter. Archived from the original on February 23, 2021.
- Agron, Dianna (August 3, 2016b). "Hi everyone. I'm @DiannaAgron and I'm here in Jordan with UNHCR, the UN Refugee Agency. This is the first post in my @Instagram takeover". Archived from the original on January 30, 2021.
- Armitage, Helen (May 23, 2022). "I Am Number Four Cast: What They Look Like Now & Biggest Movies Since". ScreenRant. "Over the past couple of years, Agron has received rave reviews for her performances in a trio of films – Kim Beckett in comedy Shiva Baby, poet Laura Riding in the biographical drama The Laureate and Abigail in Mayim Bialik's directorial debut As They Made Us."
- Barsamian, Edward (April 30, 2014). "Dianna Agron's Top 5 Gleeful looks". Vogue. Archived from the original on August 21, 2020.
- Bird, Cameron (December 19, 2014). "Young Hollywood Holiday Gift Guide: Dianna Agron, Cody Horn, and Gia Coppola Share Their Shopping Lists". Vogue. Archived from the original on August 21, 2020.
- Brown, Len (July 15, 2011). "Dianna Agron: Fashion Icon". Entertainment Tonight. Archived from the original on November 26, 2020.
- CBS Interactive (2019). "Dianna Agron biography". TV Guide. Archived from the original on November 30, 2019. "Was involved in local musical-theater productions in her youth."
- Chlotrudis Society (2022). "Shiva Baby". Chlotrudis Society for Independent Film. Archived from the original on February 12, 2022.
- Colford, Michael (March 20, 2022). "Chlotrudis Awards Showers Love on Women, Daughter and Dog". Chlotrudis Society for Independent Film. Archived from the original on March 25, 2022.
- Connelly, Sherryl (May 24, 2015). "Daughter of 'Wolf of Wall Street' pal fell hard after dad's takedown: book". NY Daily News. Archived from the original on May 24, 2015.
- Corsaro, Sandro, ed. (November 21, 2018). "Ralph Breaks the Internet Cast and Crew". Fandango Media. Archived from the original on January 11, 2021.
- Currey, Lulu (October 13, 2020). "Is Dianna Agron Still Single Since Her Split With Winston Marshall?". Showbiz Cheat Sheet. Archived from the original on October 16, 2020.
- Domnitz, Lisa (2015). "Festival Guide: Bare". Tribeca Film Festival. Archived from the original on September 19, 2020.
- Drake, Howard (2020). "Never Can Say Goodbye (song by The Glee Cast)". Music VF.com. VF Entertainment. Archived from the original on April 28, 2021.
- ET Online (August 30, 2013). "5 Things You Don't Know About Dianna Agron". Entertainment Tonight. Archived from the original on October 17, 2016.
- Frank, Jason P. (June 26, 2022). "Celebrities Respond to the Supreme Court's Overturning of Roe v. Wade". Vulture. Archived from the original on June 27, 2022.
- Fuller, Bonnie, ed. (August 4, 2011). "Dianna Agron Puts A Fresh Spin On Old Hollywood Glamour — Get Her Gorgeous Look!". Hollywood Life. Archived from the original on October 10, 2014.
- Giffoni Film Festival (2012). "Giffoni – Dianna Agron". Giffoni Film Festival. Archived from the original on October 16, 2020.
- Glamour Staff (December 7, 2010). "Style Wars: Lea V Dianna". Glamour UK. Archived from the original on August 21, 2020. "We loved Dianna's take on old Hollywood"
- Green, Adam (October 13, 2010). "It's A Mall World (2007)". ArieScope Pictures. Archived from the original on November 24, 2018.
- Inigo (December 2, 2013). "Jenny Budosh". MarsInvestigations.net. Archived from the original on December 2, 2013. "Jenny Budosh, an Aspen-partying, eyelash-flirting rich kid enjoyed Veronica's presentation to the class ... She remembered it well when, with twenty-four hours to get herself and her cronies off the hook for fraud, she masterminded the framing of the ex-con janitor for their crime."
- Kaplan, Ari (July 18, 2013). "10 Jewish Women that will Make Your Kippah Fly Off". Jstyle. Archived from the original on September 15, 2019.
- Lyons Powell, Hannah (February 9, 2015). "BAFTAs 2015 Red Carpet Hair & Beauty". Glamour UK. Archived from the original on January 16, 2021.
- Mendelsohn, Jennifer (March 14, 2019a). "If we look at Boston passenger lists, we find 12 members of the Agronsky family arriving from Novgorod Severskiy, Ukraine". Twitter. Archived from the original on August 21, 2020.
- Mendelsohn, Jennifer (March 14, 2019b). "He also says he arrived in the US on the 12th of April 1906. But in Boston. Not Ellis Island". Twitter. Archived from the original on August 21, 2020.
- Mendelsohn, Jennifer (March 14, 2019c). "And sure enough, we find the family in the 1910 census living in Kansas City. But… they're still Agronskys in 1910, four years after their arrival, proving that their name wasn't changed by immigration officials". Twitter. Archived from the original on August 21, 2020.
- Mendelsohn, Jennifer (March 14, 2019d). "If we fast forward ten more years, to 1920? Poof! They're now the "Agron" family. So apparently they began to use that name some time between 1910 and 1920, long after arriving". Twitter. Archived from the original on August 21, 2020.
- Mendelsohn, Jennifer (2020). "#Resistance Genealogy". Resistance Genealogy. Archived from the original on August 21, 2020.
- Moore, JJ (October 18, 2013a). "Fashion Face-Off: Dianna Agron vs. Michelle Pfeiffer in Off-The-Shoulder Style". E! Online. Archived from the original on August 21, 2020. "For a second we thought Dianna Agron and Michelle Pfeiffer were wearing the exact same dress. Our eyes went straight to the wide necklines and we barely noticed the rest. There's something very 'old Hollywood' about the shape these tops create"
- NARAL (March 7, 2013). "@NARAL: We <3 @DiannaAgron! On stage speaking out for women". Twitter. Archived from the original on October 25, 2013.
- Official Charts Company (July 18, 2021). "Glee Cast - Artist". Official Charts.
- Platform Presents (2020). "Platform Presents Poetry Gala 2020". Savoy Theatre. Archived from the original on October 30, 2020.
- Prahl, Amanda (December 23, 2015). "Dianna Agron | 29 Famous Guest Stars You Forgot Were on Veronica Mars". PopSugar. Archived from the original on December 23, 2015.
- Recording Academy (2018). "Winners & Nominees: Best Compilation Soundtrack for Visual Media". Grammy Awards. Archived from the original on March 22, 2019.
- Reelgood (2021). "Rushers (2007)". Archived from the original on June 12, 2021.
- ReFrame Project (February 18, 2021). "Stamp Feature Film". Archived from the original on February 18, 2021.
- Respers France, Lisa (May 8, 2023). "Dianna Agron responds to decade-long speculation about Taylor Swift relationship". CNN.
- Rock on the Net (2011a). "Grammy Awards: Best Pop Vocal Performance by a Group or Duo". Rock on the Net. Archived from the original on June 8, 2011.
- Rock on the Net (2011b). "54th Annual Grammy Awards – 2012". Rock on the Net. Archived from the original on January 20, 2020.
- Rotten Tomatoes Editorial (2021). "The Best Movies of 2021, Ranked by Tomatometer". Rotten Tomatoes. Archived from the original on May 16, 2021.
- Roures, Juan (March 2, 2022). "Las mejores películas de temática LGTB del 2021: ganadores a los VII Premios Apolo de cine LGTB". Dos Manzanas. Archived from the original on March 2, 2022.
- Russian Heritage Museum (2012). "Dianna Agron – The Jewish Beauty". Russian-American Heritage Museum. Archived from the original on April 28, 2021.
- Screen Actors Guild (December 16, 2010). "Nominations Announced for the 17th Annual Screen Actors Guild Awards". Archived from the original on August 22, 2013.
- Sawhorse Media (2013a). "Best Celebrity in Social Media". Shorty Awards. Archived from the original on June 26, 2019.
- Sawhorse Media (2013b). "Best Art in Social Media". Shorty Awards. Archived from the original on February 27, 2018.
- Sawhorse Media (2013c). "5th Shorty Awards". Shorty Awards. Archived from the original on January 21, 2019.
- Slezak, Michael (July 28, 2011). "Glee All-Time Best Musical Number Tournament: 'I Feel Pretty'/'Unpretty' Takes the Crown!". TVLine. Archived from the original on August 4, 2017.
- Sorren, Martha (July 5, 2019). "34 of the best 'Glee' performances of all time". Insider.
- Stromsodd, Jan (September 29, 2020). "Dianna Agron Made Cheerleader Film Debut in When a Stranger Calls". Your Next Dress. Archived from the original on December 1, 2020.
- TV Guide (2021). "Dianna Agron Credits". TV Guide. Red Ventures. Archived from the original on July 17, 2021.
- United Nations High Commissioner for Refugees (2017). "High Profile Supporters: Dianna Agron". UNHCR UK. Archived from the original on January 16, 2017.
- U.S. Ambassador to the UK (July 2, 2015). "Thank you @KathJenkins & @DiannaAgron. Two awesome renditions. Two awesome countries. #J4Winfield". Twitter. Archived from the original on November 11, 2020.
- Vallente, Joanna C. (March 25, 2016). "7 Female Celebrities You Probably Didn't Know Are Jewish". Kveller. Archived from the original on May 21, 2018.
- Video Detective (June 1, 2009). "A Fuchsia Elephant (2009)". Video Detective. Archived from the original on October 7, 2020.
- Zhang, Tianwei (February 15, 2025). "Demi Moore, Mikey Madison, and Fernanda Torres Turn Up for Chanel and Charles Finch Pre-BAFTA Party". WWD.
