= T.K.O. (film) =

- Theatrical release Poster
- Directed by: Declan Mulvey
- Written by: Christopher Curran; Declan Mulvey; Joe Miale; Declan Mulvey
- Produced by: James Sicignano; Nitasha Bhambree; Declan Mulvey; Kasim Saul; Anisa Qureshi; Taylor Phillips; Elizabeth Destro
- Starring: Daz Crawford; Andre "Chyna" McCoy; Anthony Ray Parker; Samantha Alarcon; Heidi Marie; Paul Green; Christian Boeving; Dianna Agron
- Cinematography: Chris Lytwyn
- Edited by: Joe Miale
- Music by: Jay A. Skinner
- Production company: United Suns Entertainment
- Distributed by: Lionsgate Home Entertainment
- Release date: March 2007
- Running time: 91 minutes
- Country: United States
- Language: English

T.K.O. (also known as Urban Assault and Las reglas de la calle) is a 2007 American action thriller film directed by Declan Mulvey and starring Dianna Agron, Samantha Alarcon, Daz Crawford, Paul Green, Heidi Marie Wanser and Christian Boeving.

The film was produced by Nitasha Bhambree, Declan Mulvey, James Sicignano, Anisa Qureshi, and Taylor Phillips.

== Premise ==
In the city where the image is everything, the criminal underworld holds a fighting tournament where legends are born, and the men who own them rule the streets.

== Cast ==
- Dianna Agron as Dyanna
- Samantha Alarcon as Skyler
- Daz Crawford as Mick
- Paul Green as Martin
- Heidi Marie Wanser as Herrera
- Christian Boeving as Rex
- Fernando Chien as Lin
- Jasper Cole as Cyrus
- Joel King as Warren
- Andre McCoy as Zendo
- Anthony Ray Parker as Slim
- Courtney Rice as Swan
- Edwin Villa as Vesto
- Lemar Knight as Mouse
- Vishnu Seesahai as Vicious
- Arron Yohe-Mellor as Jack

== Reception ==
=== Audience response ===
The film was received poorly by audiences, with IMDb users rating the film 3.4 out of 10 stars.
