= Camp Wonder =

Children's Skin Disease Foundation summer camp program

- Owner: Children's Skin Disease Foundation (sponsor)
- Established: 2001, Livermore, California
- Website: https://www.csdf.org/camp-wonder

Camp Wonder is the name of a series of medically staffed summer camps sponsored by the nonprofit organization Children's Skin Disease Foundation (CSDF).

== Background ==
Camp Wonder was established in 2001 by Francesca Tenconi, Dr. Jenny Kim and Dr. Stefani Takahashi at the UCLA School of Medicine to provide a free medically staffed summer camp experience for children with skin disease. The first Camp Wonder was established in Livermore, California, in 2001. Since its foundation, additional camps have been established in Lake Hughes, California, and Randleman, North Carolina. Camp Wonder accepts children with skin disease with medical care requirements that cannot be satisfied at traditional summer camps. The medical staff at Camp Wonder is usually 40 doctors, physician assistants and nurses, all of whom volunteer their time. Camp Wonder does not charge any fee for attendance, so it attracts and accepts many children who are economically disadvantaged. Also, because skin disease is more visual for skin with more pigmentation, Latino and African-American children benefit greatly from Camp Wonder.

=== History ===
In 1996, Francesca Tenconi was diagnosed with Pemphigus Foliaceous, a life-threatening auto-immune based skin disease. She and the other children she met while receiving medical care felt isolated and had no organization focusing on the unique challenges faced by children with such visual diseases. On her 16th birthday in 2000, Tenconi established the Children's Skin Disease Foundation in Walnut Creek, California, to raise funds for research for the treatment and potential cure of several skin diseases that affect children. In 2001 Tenconi established Camp Wonder as a summer camp for children who suffer from skin diseases in order to give them the sense of normalcy and the normal experiences that children have during the summer.

== Recognition ==
Francesca's hard work, formation of the Children's Skin Disease Foundation, establishing Camp Wonder and advocacy for children has been recognized by several organization, some of which are: In 2002, Francesca received the Prudential Spirit of Community Awards. Francesca was also named one of America's Top 10 Women to Watch in 2005 by Glamour Magazine and received the Thread of Hope Award by Diablo Magazine in 2005. In 2006, Francesca Tenconi was presented with a Jefferson Award by the American Institute for Public Service and the Brick Award by Do Something in New York. In 2004, Francesca received an international award in Venice, Italy for her work to help a child with a rare skin disease who lived near Venice.
