= JVibe =

American Jewish teen magazine

- Editor-in-Chief: Lindsey Silken
- Categories: Teen magazine
- Frequency: Bi-Monthly
- Circulation: 13,000 subscribers nationally
- Founded: 2004
- Final issue: 2009
- Company: JFL Media (defunct)
- Country: USA
- Language: English
- Website: JVibe website (inactive)

JVibe was a bimonthly magazine for Jewish teens aged 12–18, published by a company called JFL Media between 2004 and 2009.

== Overview ==
Sections of the magazine included pop culture events, celebrity interviews, news from Israel, sports stories, music, and movies.

Lack of funds forced the publisher to close down all activities in October 2009, including the publication of JVibe.

The magazine's companion website, jvibe.com, was taken over by web hosting service Jvillage Network, but has been inactive since April 2010. It included a discussion board, blog entries, on-going polls, surveys, and contests.

The magazine's website hosted "The Homer Calendar," an online guide to the Jewish ritual counting of the omer using the Homer Simpson character from The Simpsons.
