= List of Dianna Agron performances =

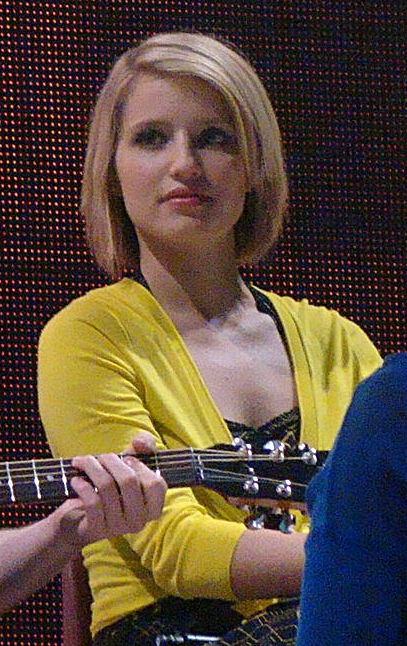
Agron as Quinn Fabray; she has portrayed the character on television, stage, and film.

Dianna Agron has appeared in twenty-eight feature films, fifteen television series/films, seven music videos, seven short films, five stage roles and six concerts, three commercials and a PSA. She has directed five projects and produced four. She has also provided vocals on several soundtrack albums.

Agron's acting career debuted in 2006 with brief film roles, but her first significant role was in CSI: NY as Jessica Grant, who appears in only one episode. After that, in 2006, Agron was featured in many TV series as a minor or recurring character, such as Drake & Josh (2006) and Shark (2006). Agron played Jenny Budosh on Veronica Mars, appearing in three episodes of the third season between 2006 and 2007. Agron was then cast as Debbie Marshall, a mean cheerleader on Heroes. Debbie was featured in five episodes of the second season as an antagonist to the main character Claire Bennet (Hayden Panettiere). In 2007, Agron landed her first main character in It's a Mall World; and later, in 2009, she was cast as Quinn Fabray on the hit musical TV show Glee. Quinn was first introduced as an antagonist, the captain of the cheerleading squad and Finn Hudson's (Cory Monteith) girlfriend. After being part of the regular cast for the first three seasons, Agron moved away from television roles but continued as a guest star for the final three seasons.

In her early film career, Agron appeared in T.K.O. (2007), Skid Marks (2007), The Romantics (2010), and Burlesque (2010). In 2011, Agron portrayed Alice in The Hunters, and the lead role of Sarah Hart in I Am Number Four. Later that year, Agron was featured in Glee: The 3D Concert Movie. Post-Glee, she co-starred as Belle Blake in the 2013 film The Family, alongside Robert De Niro, Michelle Pfeiffer, and Tommy Lee Jones. In 2015, Agron portrayed Dalia in the political thriller Zipper, Finley in the romantic comedy Tumbledown, Sarah Barton in the drama Bare, and narrated part of the film Unity. That same year, she starred in the play McQueen on the West End. In 2017, she appeared in The Crash, Novitiate, and Hollow in the Land. She has performed three self-titled concerts of musical covers. Her feature film directorial debut came with 2019's Berlin, I Love You, in which she also starred. In 2020, she starred in the dark comedy film Shiva Baby, as well as a virtual performance of part of the Kate Cortesi play Is Edward Snowden Single?. In 2021, she appeared in The Laureate and filmed As They Made Us and Acidman.

In 2010, Agron's filmography was discussed by characters of The Office in the episode "Viewing Party".

== Film ==
Year	Title	Role	Notes	Refs.
2006	When a Stranger Calls	Cheerleader	Uncredited cameo	
2007	T.K.O.	Dyanna		
2007	Skid Marks	Megan		
2007	Rushers	Kyle's Girl	Short film	
2008	The Graduates			
2008	The General	Anna	Funny or Die short film	
2009	Scouts Honor	Girl #2		
2009	Dinner with Raphael	Dianna	Short film	
2009	A Fuchsia Elephant	Charlotte Hill	Short film; also writer, director and producer	
2010	The Romantics	Minnow Hayes		
2010	Burlesque	Natalie		
2010	Bold Native	Samantha		
2011	The Hunters	Alice		
2011	I Am Number Four	Sarah Hart		
2011	Glee: The 3D Concert Movie	Quinn Fabray	Concert performance and documentary	
2013	The Family	Belle Blake		
2014	Transformation		Documentary short film for Liberatum	
2015	Zipper	Dalia		
2015	Tumbledown	Finley		
2015	Bare	Sarah Barton		
2015	Unity		Documentary; narrator	
2017	The Crash	Amelia Rhondart		
2017	Novitiate	Sister Mary Grace		
2017	Hollow in the Land	Alison Miller		
2018	Ralph Breaks the Internet	News Anchor	Voice role	
2019	Against the Clock	Tess Chandler		
2019	Berlin, I Love You	Katarina	Also director (segment: "Lucinda in Berlin")	
2020	Abracashoes	Volunteer	Short film	
2020	Shiva Baby	Kim Beckett		
2021	The Laureate	Laura Riding	Also executive producer	
2022	As They Made Us	Abigail		
2022	Acidman	Maggie	Also producer	
2023	Clock	Ella Patel		
2024	Resistance: They Fought Back	Bela Hazan	Documentary; voice performance	
2024	Crossroads		Documentary short film for Armani	
TBA	The Gun on Second Street		Filming	

== Television ==
Year	Title	Role	Notes	Refs.
2006	Close to Home	Drunk Girl	Episode: "Homecoming"	
2006	CSI: NY	Jessica	Episode: "Murder Sings the Blues"	
2006	Drake & Josh	Lexi	Episode: "The Great Doheny"	
2006	Shark	Gia Mellon	Episode: "Love Triangle"	
2006	After Midnight: Life Behind Bars	Kelly	Television film	
2006–2007	Veronica Mars	Jenny Budosh	Recurring role; 3 episodes	
2007	Heroes	Debbie Marshall	Recurring role; 5 episodes	
2007	It's a Mall World	Harper	Main role	
2008	Heroes Unmasked	Debbie Marshall	Archive footage; 2 episodes	
2008	Numb3rs	Kelly Rand	Episode: "Jack of All Trades"	
2009	Celebrities Anonymous	Sadie	Main role	
2012	Punk'd	Herself	Victim; Episode: "Hayden Panettiere"	
2009–2015	Glee	Quinn Fabray	Main role (seasons 1–3); Recurring role (season 6); Guest role (seasons 4–5)	
2020	Robot Chicken	Various	Voice role; Episode: "Max Caenen in: Why Would He Know If His Mother's A Size Queen"	
2023	The Chosen One	Sarah	Main role	
2025	Doctor Odyssey	Katherine Massey	Episode: "Hot Tub Week"	

== Audio ==
Year	Title	Role	Notes	Refs.
2022	Narcissa	Sid	Main role; also executive producer	

== Stage ==
=== Theatre and performance ===
Year	Title	Role	Location	Refs.
2010	Glee Live! In Concert!	Quinn Fabray	North America tour	
2011	Glee Live! In Concert!	Quinn Fabray	North America, UK, and Ireland tour	
2013	These Girls		Joe's Pub, New York City	
2015	McQueen	Dahlia	St. James Theatre, London	
2020	Is Edward Snowden Single?	Various	Virtual (Platform Presents)	

=== Concerts ===
Year	Title	Location	Refs.
2010	Chickens in Love MINI Music Festival	The Echoplex, Los Angeles	
2013	YM&C Concert	The Echoplex	
2017	Dianna Agron	Café Carlyle, New York City	
2019	Dianna Agron	Café Carlyle	
2022	Dianna Agron	Café Carlyle	
2024	Dianna Agron	Café Carlyle	

== Music videos ==
Year	Title	Artist(s)	Role	Director(s)	Refs.
2010	"Body"	Thao & The Get Down Stay Down		Dianna Agron	
2011	"Fashion"	Glee cast		Trey Laird	
2013	"Oh, You Beautiful Doll"	Dianna Agron	Triple threat	Jacob Brown	
2013	"Just Another Girl"	The Killers	Brandon Flowers	Warren Fu	
2014	"I'm Not the Only One"	Sam Smith	Scorned bride	Luke Monaghan	
2014	"Imagine" (UNICEF: World version)	Various		Michael Jurkovac	

== Commercials ==
Year	Company	Notes	Refs.
2006	Nike, Inc.	Dancer, promoting Nike Women activewear	
2012	Ad Council/USDOT/NHTSA	"Stop the Texts. Stop the Wrecks." texting and driving PSA; footage from Glee episode "On My Way"	
2012	Nintendo	Promoting the Nintendo 3DS game Art Academy	
2012	Nintendo	Promoting the Nintendo 3DS game Professor Layton and the Miracle Mask, with her brother	

== As director ==
=== Film ===
Year	Title	Notes	Refs.
2009	A Fuchsia Elephant	Short film; also actress, writer and producer	
2015	L'Américaine	Short film for Tory Burch LLC	
2019	Berlin, I Love You	Feature film (segment: "Lucinda in Berlin"); also actress	

=== Music videos ===
Year	Title	Artist	Refs.
2010	"Body"	Thao & The Get Down Stay Down	
2014	"Till Sunrise"	Goldroom	

== As producer ==
=== Film ===
Year	Title	Notes	Refs.
2009	A Fuchsia Elephant	Short film; also actress, writer and director	
2021	The Laureate	Also actress	
2022	Acidman	Also actress	

=== Audio ===
Year	Title	Notes	Refs.
2022	Narcissa	Also actress	

== Discography ==
=== Soundtracks ===
- 2009: Glee: The Music, Volume 1
- 2010: Glee: The Music, The Power of Madonna
- 2010: Glee: The Music, Volume 3 Showstoppers
- 2010: Glee: The Music, Journey to Regionals
- 2010: Glee: The Music, The Rocky Horror Glee Show
- 2010: Glee: The Music, The Complete Season One
- 2010: Glee: The Music, The Christmas Album
- 2010: Glee: The Music, Volume 4
- 2010: Glee: The Music, The Complete Season One CD Collection
- 2011: Glee: The Music, Volume 5
- 2011: Glee: The Music, Volume 6
- 2011: Glee: The 3D Concert Movie (Motion Picture Soundtrack)
- 2011: Glee: The Music, Volume 7
- 2012: Glee: The Music, The Graduation Album
- 2012: Glee: The Music, The Complete Season Two
- 2012: Glee: The Music, The Complete Season Three
- 2012: Glee: The Music, Season 4, Volume 1
- 2014: Glee: The Music, The Complete Season Four
- 2014: Glee: The Music - Celebrating 100 Episodes
- 2015: Glee: The Music, Homecoming
- 2015: Glee: The Music, Jagged Little Tapestry
- 2021: Glee Love Songs

=== Writing ===
- 2016: "Fool You've Landed" (with Winston Marshall and Matthew Field) – Mumford & Sons featuring Beatenberg and the Very Best
