= Rena Sofer =

American actress (born 1968)

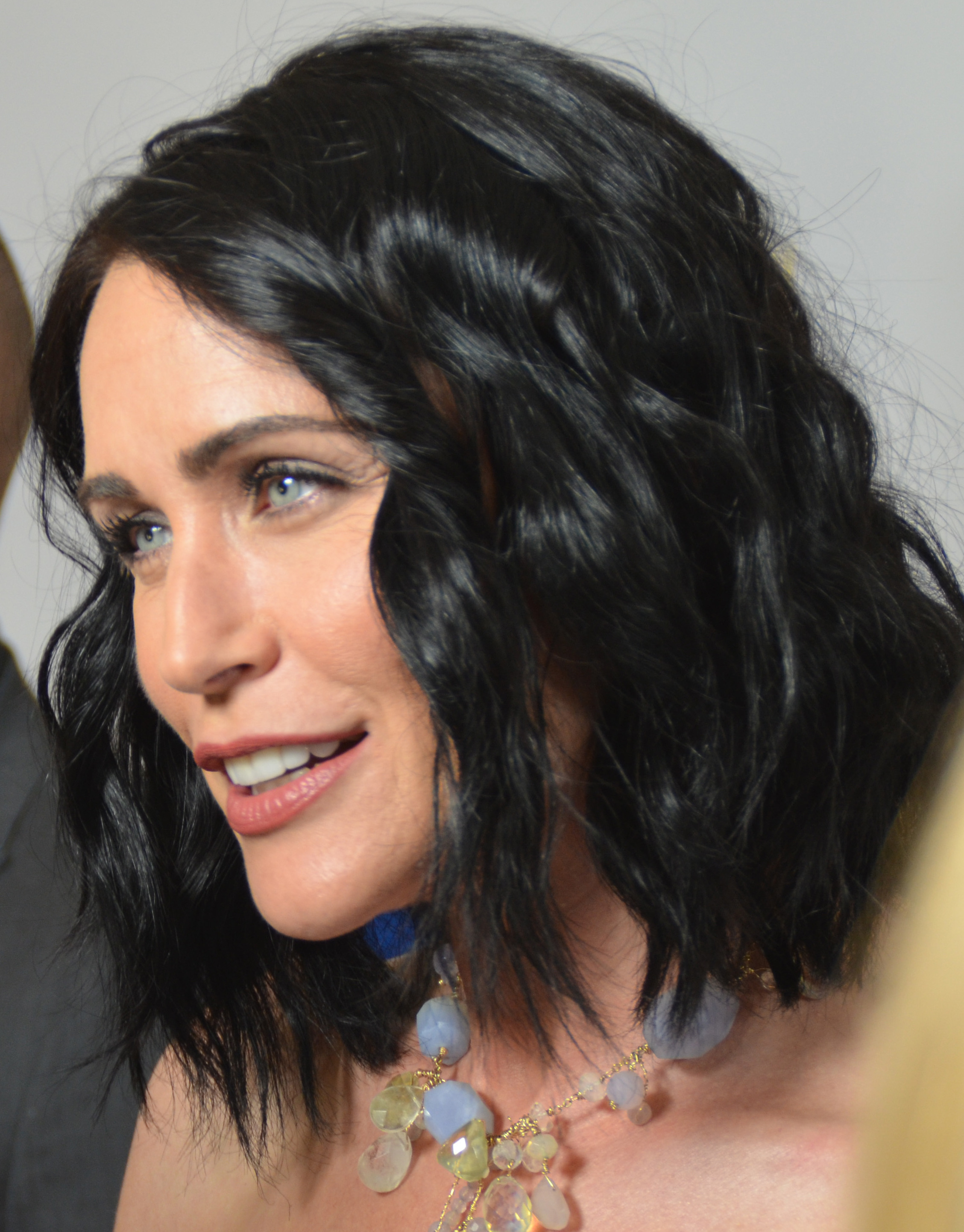
- Sofer in 2014
- Born: Rena Sherel Sofer; December 2, 1968 (age 57); Arcadia, California, U.S.
- Occupation: Actress
- Years active: 1984–present
- Spouses: Wally Kurth (m. 1995; div. 1997) Sanford Bookstaver (m. 2003; div. 2017) (m. 2024)
- Children: 2

Rena Sherel Sofer (born December 2, 1968) is an American actress, known for her appearances in daytime television, episodic guest appearances, and made-for-television movies. In 1995, Sofer received a Daytime Emmy Award for her portrayal of Lois Cerullo in the soap opera General Hospital. She reprised the role of Lois in October 2023. From 2013 to 2022, she played Quinn Fuller on the CBS soap opera The Bold and the Beautiful.

== Early life ==
Sofer was born in Arcadia, California, the daughter of Susan Sofer (née Franzblau), a psychology professor, and Martin Sofer, an Orthodox rabbi.

She grew up in New Jersey and Pennsylvania and attended the Frisch School. Sofer lived in North Bergen, New Jersey, where her father was rabbi of synagogue Temple Beth El. She graduated from North Bergen High School, then attended classes at Montclair State College.

== Career ==
=== Daytime television ===
Sofer first played Lois Marie Cerullo on General Hospital. Her first appearance was in 1993 as a band manager. However, her first high-profile role was as Rocky McKenzie on the daytime soap opera Loving (1988–1991).

Sofer is perhaps best known for her role as Lois Cerullo on General Hospital (December 15, 1993 – September 24, 1996). She later returned as a guest star (February 7–17, 1997; September 30 – October 2, 1997). Her portrayal of the outrageous Lois won Sofer a Daytime Emmy Award in 1995 for Outstanding Supporting Actress in a Drama Series.

In May 2013, it was announced that Sofer would join the CBS soap opera The Bold and the Beautiful, in a newly created role of Quinn Fuller; her first episode aired on July 12. After nine years on the canvas, Sofer opted to end her run in the role of Quinn; she last aired on August 29, 2022.

On September 14, 2023, People announced Sofer would reprise the role of Lois on General Hospital after a 26-year absence.

On October 24, 2025, it was announced that Sofer had ended her run on General Hospital as Cerullo.

=== Primetime television ===
Sofer has appeared in several high-profile prime time television series in a guest star/supporting cast member roles: Seinfeld, Melrose Place, The Chronicle, Ed, Friends, Spin City, Blind Justice, Ghost Whisperer, 24, NCIS, and Two and a Half Men.

Sofer briefly joined the cast of the NBC sitcom Just Shoot Me!, playing the character Vicky Costa. The network later cast Sofer in the short-lived American remake of the British series Coupling. Sofer has appeared in the NBC TV series Heroes as the recurring character Heidi Petrelli, wife of aspiring politician Nathan Petrelli (Adrian Pasdar). She appeared on Two and a Half Men in 2008, as a former girlfriend of the character Charlie Harper (Charlie Sheen). Rena also has guest starred on Dirty Sexy Money playing an intrepid reporter and played a ghost on Ghost Whisperer. In early 2010, Sofer began a recurring role on NCIS as attorney Margaret Allison Hart, a potential love interest for the character Leroy Jethro Gibbs (Mark Harmon). She had a brief guest role on Bones as a love interest for the character Seeley Booth (David Boreanaz).

In 2013, Sofer had a publicized appearance on Once Upon a Time, playing Snow White's mother.

=== Film ===
In film, she appeared as a love interest of Ben Stiller's character in the film Keeping the Faith, starring Jenna Elfman, Stiller and Edward Norton (who also directed). She also played a bride to-be with Melanie Griffith in Sidney Lumet's movie A Stranger Among Us and in Penelope Buitenhuis's movie The Secret of Hidden Lake.

She played the P.E. teacher Ms. Desjarden in the television film adaptation of Carrie in 2002. She starred in the television movie Always and Forever which aired October 24, 2009, on the Hallmark Channel. She has been doing TV movies since 1992, when she starred as Andrea Larson in the television movie Saved by the Bell: Hawaiian Style.

== Personal life ==
Sofer and her General Hospital co-star Wally Kurth, who played her onscreen love interest, became involved as their characters' storyline progressed. In 1995, the actors were married and had a daughter. In 1997, Sofer and Kurth divorced.

Sofer married television director and producer Sanford Bookstaver in 2003. On August 5, 2005, Sofer gave birth to her second daughter, her first with Bookstaver, in Los Angeles. Sofer and Bookstaver eventually divorced in 2017. In 2019, Sofer announced they had reconciled and in April announced their engagement, and they later remarried in 2024.

== Filmography ==
Films
Year	Film	Role	Director(s)	Notes	Ref.
1992	A Stranger Among Us	Shayna Singer	Sidney Lumet	Crime–drama film	
1994	Twin Sitters	Judy	John Paragon	Comedy film Also known as The Babysitters	
1998	Nightmare Street	Penny Randolph	Colin Bucksey	Thriller film	
2000	Keeping the Faith	Rachel Rose	Edward Norton	Romantic comedy film	
2000	Traffic	Helena's Friend	Steven Soderbergh	Crime–drama film	
2001	March	Hedy Pullman	James P. Mercurio	Drama film	
2009	Rock Slyde	Sara	Chris Dowling	Comedy film	
2010	Sarah	Teenage Sarah	Ted Hunter; Louis La Volpe	Drama film	
2025	Vespertine	Marlowe	Lauri Levenfeld; Grace Wethor	Short film	

Television
Year	Film	Role	Notes
1987	Another World	Joyce Abernathy	9 episodes
1988–91	Loving	Amelia "Rocky" McKenzie Domeq	34 episodes
1992	Freshman Dorm	Veronica	2 episodes
1992	Saved by the Bell: Hawaiian Style	Andrea Larson	Made-for-TV movie directed by Don Barnhart
1993	Herman's Head	Stephanie	Episode: "When Hermy Met Crawford's Girlfriend"
1993–97; 2023–25	General Hospital	Lois Cerullo	Contract role held from December 15, 1993 to September 24, 1996; recurring role held from February 7, 1997 to October 2, 1997, and October 10, 2023 to October 24, 2025
1996	Hostile Advances: The Kerry Ellison Story	Kerry Ellison	Made-for-TV movie directed by Allan Kroeker
1996	Caroline in the City	Risa Glickman	Episode: "Caroline and the Nice Jewish Boy"
1997	Seinfeld	Mary Anne	Episode: "The Muffin Tops"
1997	The Stepsister	Darcy Canfield Ray	Made-for-TV movie directed by Charles Correll
1998	Ellen	Jean	Episode: "Womyn Fest"
1998	Two Guys, a Girl, and a Pizza Place	Lauren Henderson	Episode: "Two Guys, a Girl, and a Recovery"
1998	Timecop	Dr. Carrie Ann Trent	Episode: "D.O.A."
1998	Glory, Glory	Elizabeth	Made-for-TV movie directed by Robert Butler
1998–99	Melrose Place	Eve Cleary	Main role (Credited as a Recurring Character) 25 episodes
1999	Oh, Grow Up	Suzanne Vandermeer	Contract role held from September 22 to December 28, 1999
2000	Opposite Sex	Ms. Gibson	Episode: "Pilot"
2000	Spin City	Sam	Episode: "Lost and Found"
2001	The Weber Show	Dawn Cheswick	Episode: "Dog Eat Dog"
2001	Ed	Bonnie Hane	7 episodes
2001–02	The Chronicle	Grace Hall	22 episodes
2002	Friends	Katie	Episode: "The One with the Cooking Class"
2002	Carrie	Rita Desjardin	Made-for-TV movie directed by David Carson
2002–03	Just Shoot Me!	Vicki Costa	14 episodes
2002–04	Teamo Supremo	Libro Shushman	Episode: "Word Search"
2003	CSI: Miami	Alison	Episode: "Grave Young Men"
2003	Coupling	Susan Freeman	Main role
2005	Blind Justice	Christie Dunbar	Main role
2006–07	Heroes	Heidi Petrelli	5 episodes
2006	The Secret of Hidden Lake	Maggie Dolan	Made-for-TV movie directed by Penelope Buitenhuis
2007	24	Marilyn Bauer	12 episodes
2008	Ghost Whisperer	Tammy	Episode: "Ball & Chain"
2008–10	Two and a Half Men	Chrissy	2 episodes
2009	Dirty Sexy Money	News Reporter	Episode: "The Facts"
2009	Monk	Kim Kelly	Episode: "Mr. Monk's Favorite Show"
2009	Always & Forever	Grace Holland	Made-for-TV movie directed by Kevin Connor
2009	Criminal Minds	Erika Silverman	Episode: "The Slave of Duty"
2010	Bones	Dr. Catherine Bryar	Episode: "The Predator in the Pool"
2010	NCIS	Margaret Allison Hart	6 episodes
2010	The Devil's Teardrop	Joan	Made-for-TV movie directed by Norma Bailey
2010	Royal Pains	AJ	Episode: "Open Up Your Yenta Mouth and Say Ah"
2010	Medium	Dr. Natalie Salem	Episode: "Native Tongue"
2011	Another Man's Wife	Hadley Warner	Made-for-TV movie directed by Anthony Lefresne
2011–12	Covert Affairs	Geena	3 episodes
2012	House	Marlene Reese	Episode: "Man of the House"
2012	The Glades	Alexis Cane	Episode: "Old Times"
2012	Beauty & the Beast	Sabrina Meyer	Episode: "Bridesmaid Up!"
2013	Once Upon a Time	Queen Eva	Episode: "The Queen is Dead"
2013–22	The Bold and the Beautiful	Quinn Fuller	Contract role held from July 12, 2013 to August 29, 2022
2014	Chicago P.D.	Doctor	Episode: "Chin Check"
2017	Jeopardy!	Herself/Clue giver	Season 3:Ep 88

== Awards and nominations ==
List of acting awards and nominations
Year	Award	Category	Title	Result	Ref.
1995	Daytime Emmy Award	Outstanding Supporting Actress in a Drama Series	General Hospital	Won	
1995	Soap Opera Digest Award	Outstanding Younger Lead Actress	General Hospital	Won	
2016	Soap Awards France	Best Villain of the Year	The Bold and the Beautiful	Won	
2016	Soap Awards France	Best New Character	The Bold and the Beautiful	Nominated	
2017	Soap Awards France	Best Actress of the Year	The Bold and the Beautiful	Nominated	
2017	Soap Awards France	Best Villain of the Year	The Bold and the Beautiful	Nominated	
2018	Soap Awards France	Best Villain of the Year	The Bold and the Beautiful	Won	
2018	Soap Awards France	Best Couple of the Year — "Quinn and Eric" (shared with John McCook)	The Bold and the Beautiful	Nominated	
