= The Secret of Hidden Lake =

- Genre: Thriller
- Written by: David Golden
- Directed by: Penelope Buitenhuis
- Starring: Rena Sofer; Winston Rekert; Linda Darlow
- Music by: Michael Neilson
- Country of origin: United States
- Original language: English

Production
- Producer: Harvey Kahn
- Cinematography: Adam Sliwinski
- Running time: 85 minutes
- Production companies: Front Street Pictures; Front Pictures Productions; Open Road Productions

Original release
- Network: Lifetime
- Release: October 29, 2006

The Secret of Hidden Lake (also titled Deadly Season outside the United States) is a 2006 American made-for-television thriller film starring Rena Sofer and Winston Rekert. The film first aired on October 29, 2006 on Lifetime Network.

== Plot ==
A young woman named Maggie Dolan (Rena Sofer) who works at a legal aid center in Chicago, suddenly hears that her father, Frank Dolan (Winston Rekert) got injured while hunting. Maggie then returns to her hometown in Colorado to be at her father's side. During her stay, she learns that her father's injury was not an accident. As Maggie tries to unravel the mystery of what really happened, hidden secrets start to surface, putting her life in jeopardy.

== Cast ==
- Rena Sofer as Maggie Dolan
- Winston Rekert as Frank Dolan
- Linda Darlow as Alice Crandell
- Adam Harrington as Sam
- William B. Davis as Judge Landers
- Bill Mondy as Zach Roth
- Renae Morriseau as Sheriff Tillane
- Kett Turton as Jack Ford Jr.
- Dean Wray as Jack Ford Sr.
- Jodelle Ferland as Young Maggie Dolan
- Elfina Luk as Barb
- Timothy Paul Perez as Dr. Perez
- Christine Barrie as Maggie's mother
