= Caged No More =

- Theatrical release poster
- Directed by: Lisa Arnold
- Written by: Lisa Arnold; Molly Venzke
- Produced by: Lisa Arnold; Jarred Coates; Paige Collins; Jennifer Willingham
- Starring: Loretta Devine; Kevin Sorbo; Alan Powell; Cassidy Gifford; Cynthia Gibb; Anthony Evans; Kathie Lee Gifford; Natalie Grant; Bobby Jindall; Gretchen Carlson
- Cinematography: Marlon Torres
- Edited by: Florent Retz
- Music by: Jay Weigel
- Production companies: Check the Gate Productions; Film Incito; Red Entertainment Group
- Distributed by: Freestyle Releasing
- Release date: January 22, 2016
- Running time: 90 minutes
- Country: United States
- Language: English
- Box office: $114,959

Caged No More is a 2016 American drama film directed by Lisa Arnold and written by Lisa Arnold and Molly Venzke. The film stars Kevin Sorbo, Loretta Devine, Cynthia Gibb, Madison De La Garza, Cassidy Gifford and Dallas Lovato. The film was released on January 22, 2016, by Freestyle Releasing.

== Plot ==
A woman and a former Special Forces soldier try to stop a man from trafficking his two young daughters in Europe.

== Cast ==
- Kevin Sorbo as Richard / Jack
- Loretta Devine as Aggie
- Cynthia Gibb as Lottie
- Madison De La Garza as Constanza
- Cassidy Gifford as Skye
- Dallas Lovato as Alicia
- Debra Wilson as Leona
- Alan Powell as Will
- Christos Vasilopoulos as Aeton
- Stella Allen as Young Skye
- George Kosturos as Galen
- Abigail Duhon as Elle
- Danielle Beckwith as Julie
- Shawn-Caulin Young as Zach
- Grayson Berry as Matt
- Jay Amor as Serge Thug
- Patrick Kearns as Police Officer
- Ladson Deyne as Kostas
- John Teal Jr. as Brute
- Madelon Curtis as Madame
- Sokratis Alafouzos as Christos
- Johnny Stassi as Serge
- Anthony Evans as Tyler
- Alex Johnson as Casey

== Release ==
The film was released on January 22, 2016, by Freestyle Releasing.

Despite a teaser at the end of the film, there is no known sequel to the film.
