= Run the Race =

2019 American Christian drama film

- Theatrical release poster
- Directed by: Chris Dowling
- Screenplay by: Jake McEntire & Jason Baumgardner and Chris Dowling
- Story by: Jake McEntire
- Produced by: Darren Moorman; Jake McEntire; Ken Carpenter
- Starring: Tanner Stine; Evan Hofer; Kristoffer Polaha; Kelsey Reinhardt; Mario Van Peebles; Mykelti Williamson; Frances Fisher
- Cinematography: Kristopher Kimlin
- Edited by: Dan O'Brien
- Music by: Paul Mills
- Production companies: The WTA Group; Reserve Entertainment; 10th Leper Productions
- Distributed by: Roadside Attractions
- Release dates: March 2018 (Christian Worldview Film Festival); February 22, 2019 (United States)
- Running time: 101 minutes
- Country: United States
- Languages: English, German
- Budget: $1.5 million
- Box office: $6.4 million

Run the Race is a 2018 American Christian drama film directed by Chris Dowling. It follows two young brothers who use football to cope with their mother's death and father's abandonment of them. Tim Tebow acts as an executive producer on the film. It was released in the United States on February 22, 2019, by Roadside Attractions.

== Production ==
Filming for the movie took place in Birmingham, Alabama. Tim Tebow and his brother, Robbie Tebow, served as executive producers of the film.

== Release ==
In October 2018, Roadside Attractions acquired the film and set it for a February 22, 2019 release.

== Reception ==
=== Box office ===
The film made $2.3 million in its opening weekend, finishing 10th at the box office.

=== Critical response ===
On review aggregator Rotten Tomatoes, Run the Race holds an approval rating of 44% based on 9 reviews, with an average rating of 6.5/10. On Metacritic, the film has a weighted average score of 35 out of 100, based on 4 critics, indicating "generally unfavorable reviews".
