= Kerr Smith =

American actor (born 1972)

- Smith at GalaxyCon San Jose in 2026
- Born: March 9, 1972 (age 54); Exton, Pennsylvania, U.S.
- Education: University of Vermont
- Occupation: Actor
- Years active: 1996–present
- Spouses: Harmoni Everett (m. 2003; div. 2009) Lisa Smith (m. 2017)

Kerr Smith (born March 9, 1972) is an American actor. He began his career with a recurring role as Ryder Hughes on the CBS soap opera As the World Turns (1996–1997). Smith had his breakout with a main role as Jack McPhee on the WB teen drama television series Dawson's Creek (1998–2003).

Following Dawson's Creek, Smith had starring roles in the films The Broken Hearts Club (2000), Final Destination (2000), and The Forsaken (2001). He also had main roles as Bobby Wilkerson on the NBC series E-Ring (2005–2006) and Tom Nicholson on the Fox series Justice (2006–2007). In the late 2000s, Smith starred in the slasher film My Bloody Valentine 3D (2009).

In the 2010s, Smith had a main role as Ryan Thomas on the CW series Life Unexpected (2010–2011) and starred in the film Where Hope Grows (2014). He had recurring roles as Robert Quinn on the Freeform drama series The Fosters (2014–2018) and Holden Honey on the CW series Riverdale (2019–2020).

== Early life ==
Kerr Smith is the son of Barbara Smith (née Hess) and a father who works as a financial advisor.

Smith has a sister named Allison. He attended Peirce Middle School and he graduated from Henderson High School in West Chester, Pennsylvania, then studied at the University of Vermont, where he was a member of Kappa Sigma fraternity. He was also top of his class senior year.

== Career ==
Smith began acting with roles on As the World Turns as Ryder Hughes from 1996 to 1997, the films Final Destination (2000) and a cameo in The Broken Hearts Club (2000), written and directed by Dawson's Creek writer Greg Berlanti. He was a guest star on The WB's hit show Charmed as Agent Kyle Brody, a love interest for the fourth sister, Paige Matthews (Rose McGowan).

When he first appeared as Jack McPhee in the second season of The WB's Dawson's Creek, Smith portrayed a 16-year-old high school student; in reality, the actor was 26. Smith was 31 when the series ended its six-year run in 2003. He was the first man to have an on-screen gay kiss on American television, in season three of Dawson's Creek.

In 2002, Smith starred in the TV film Critical Assembly, alongside Katherine Heigl. The film depicts young activists trying to stop a catastrophic nuclear explosion.

Smith was the last person ever to be pranked on the original run of the MTV show Punk'd. In 2007, he appeared in several episodes of the popular TV series CSI: NY as Andrew "Drew" Bedford, the 333 stalker. He also played the radio host Ryan Thomas on The CW's drama series Life Unexpected.

Smith guest-starred on the television show NCIS, where he played Jonas Cobb, a naval officer who was the "Port-to-Port Killer," a serial killer who targets Navy personnel. He made his last appearance on the 8th season finale "Pyramid".

In 2014, Smith began playing Robert Quinn on The Fosters. The same year, he starred in the acclaimed movie Where Hope Grows. He also played Frank Cowles in season 10 episode "X" of Criminal Minds.

Smith debuted on The CW's Riverdale, as Holden Honey, the principal of Riverdale High, in season 4, replacing Waldo Weatherbee (Peter James Bryant), who “ascended” with the rest of the cult followers known as “The Farm”.

== Personal life ==
Smith married actress Harmoni Everett on June 7, 2003. He filed for divorce on March 20, 2009.

== Filmography ==
=== Film ===
Year	Title	Role	Notes
1999	Hit and Runway	Joey Worciuekowski	
1999	Lucid Days in Hell	Kelly	
2000	The Broken Hearts Club: A Romantic Comedy	Catcher	
2000	Final Destination	Carter Horton	
2001	The Forsaken	Sean	
2002	Pressure	Steve Hillman	
2004	Cruel Intentions 3	Jason Argyle	
2004	Road Kill	Jason	Short film
2009	My Bloody Valentine 3D	Axel Palmer	
2011	Final Destination 5	Carter Horton	Archive footage; uncredited
2012	Death Artists, Inc.	Stephen	Short film
2013	Criticized	William Reynolds	
2014	Where Hope Grows	Mitch Minniear	
2014	What an Idiot	Mike	
2016	Criticsized	William Reynolds	
2023	3008	Kyle	

=== Television ===
Year	Title	Role	Notes
1996–1997	As the World Turns	Ryder Hughes	24 episodes
1998	Baywatch	Sean	Episode: "The Natural"
1998–2003	Dawson's Creek	Jack McPhee	Main cast (113 episodes)
2000	CSI: Crime Scene Investigation	A Collins Boy	Episode: "Blood Drops"
2002	The Outer Limits	Zach Burnham	Episode: "The Tipping Point"
2002	Critical Assembly	Bobby Damon	Television film
2003	Miss Match	Santa Claus	Episode: "Santa, Baby"
2004	Silver Lake	Dennis Patterson	Television film
2004–2005	Charmed	Kyle Brody	10 episodes
2005	CSI: Miami	Matthew Wilton	Episode: "Game Over"
2005	The Closer	Blake Rawlings	Episode: "Batter Up"
2005–2006	E-Ring	Bobby Wilkerson	Main cast (16 episodes)
2006–2007	Justice	Tom Nicholson	Main cast (13 episodes)
2007	Punk'd	Himself	Episode: "May 29, 2007"
2007	CSI: NY	Drew Bedford	4 episodes
2008–2009	Eli Stone	Paul Rollins	5 episodes
2009	The Forgotten	Patrick Dent	Episode: "Diamond Jane"
2010–2011	Life Unexpected	Ryan Thomas	Main cast (26 episodes)
2011	NCIS	Navy Lt. Jonas Cobb	2 episodes
2013	An American Girl: Saige Paints the Sky	David Copeland	Television film
2014–2018	The Fosters	Robert Quinn	19 episodes
2014	Criminal Minds	Frank Cowles	Episode: "X"
2015	Stalker	John Bardo	Episode: "The News"
2016	Agents of S.H.I.E.L.D.	Joseph Bauer	3 episodes
2017	Doubt	ADA PJ Arrington	Episode: "Top Dog/Underdog"
2018	Wisdom of the Crowd	Supervisor Simko	Episode: "The Tipping Point"
2019	NCIS: Los Angeles	FBI Agent David Ross	2 episodes
2019	Into the Dark	Shane	Episode: "Pilgrim"
2019–2020	Riverdale	Principal Holden Honey	9 episodes
2021	The Resident	Jacob Yorn	3 episodes
