= Thomas Haden Church =

American actor (born 1960)

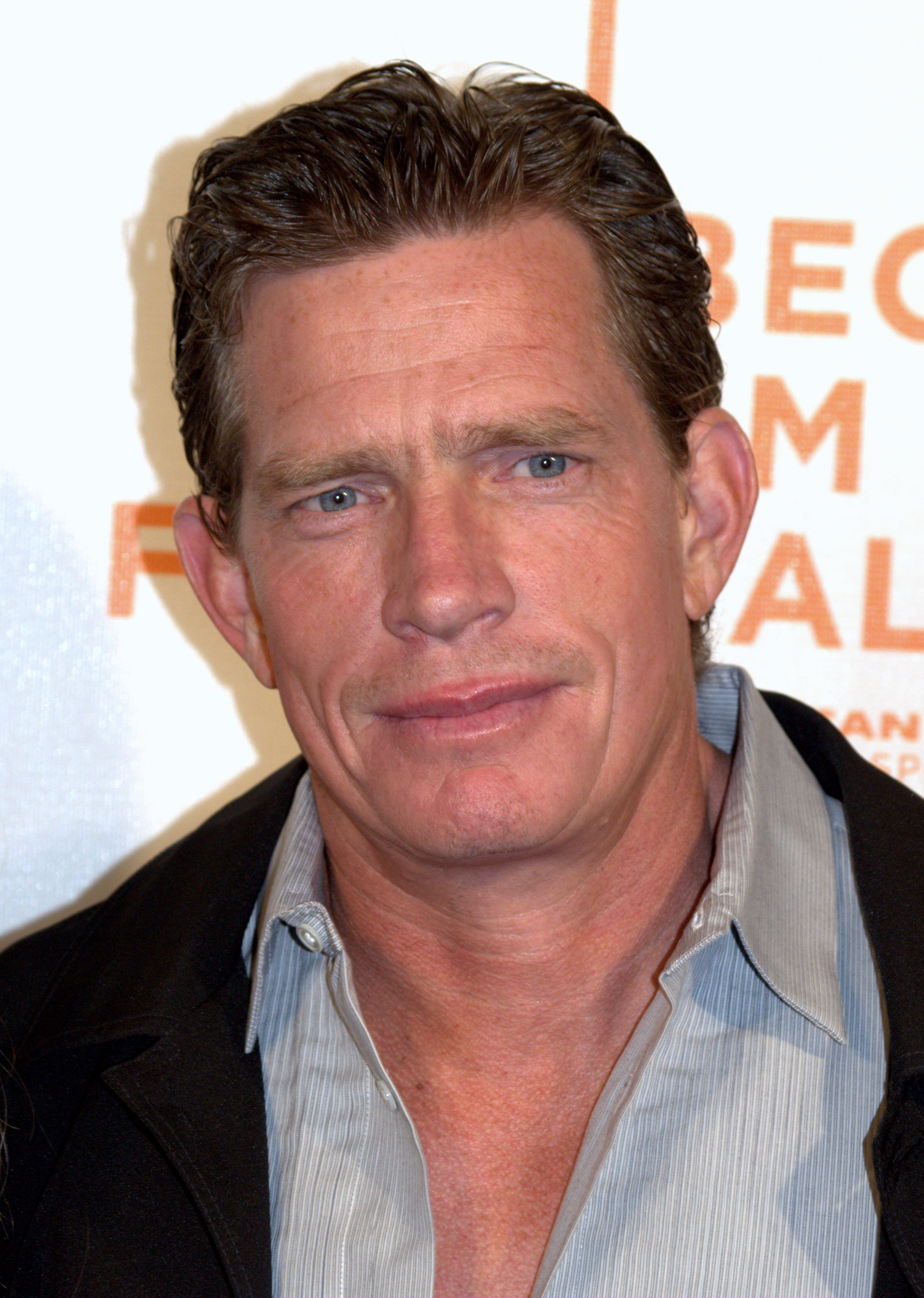
- Church in 2009
- Born: Thomas Richard McMillen; June 17, 1960 (age 66); Woodland, California, U.S.
- Education: University of North Texas
- Occupation: Actor
- Years active: 1989–present
- Partner: Mia Zottoli (2002–2008)
- Children: 2

Thomas Haden Church (born Thomas Richard McMillen; June 17, 1960) is an American actor. After starring in the 1990s sitcom Wings and playing the lead for two seasons in Ned and Stacey (1995–1997), Church became known for his film work, including his role of Lyle van de Groot in George of the Jungle (1997), his Academy Award–nominated performance in Sideways (2004), his role as the Marvel Comics villain Sandman in the superhero films Spider-Man 3 (2007) and Spider-Man: No Way Home (2021), as well as his starring roles in Over the Hedge (2006), Smart People (2008), Easy A (2010), We Bought a Zoo (2011), Max (2015), and Hellboy (2019). He made his directorial debut with Rolling Kansas (2003), which he also wrote. In 2023, he starred as antagonist Agent Stone in the post-apocalyptic action comedy series Twisted Metal.

== Early life ==
Church was born Thomas Richard McMillen on June 17, 1960, in Woodland, Yolo County, California, to Maxine (née Sanders; 1936–2021) and Carlos "Carl" Richard McMillen (1936–2008), who served for eight years in the United States Marine Corps and who was on active duty at the end of the Korean War; after 1962, Carl worked as a surveyor. Church's parents divorced, and he and his mother moved to Laredo, Texas. She remarried in 1969, to widower George A. Quesada, a veteran of a United States Army Air Forces reconnaissance unit which served in Guam in World War II. Church took his stepfather's surname for a time but changed it to 'Haden Church', extracted from the names of other relatives, when people found 'Quesada' difficult to pronounce. Church would often hunt with his stepfather and his stepfather's friends along the Rio Grande Valley and started working on a ranch in Webb County, Texas, when he was 13. He left high school in 1977 to work in the oil fields of Louisiana, but he returned to graduate from Harlingen High School in 1979. He attended the University of North Texas while living in Dallas.

== Career ==
Church started in the entertainment business as a radio personality and doing voice-over work. After appearing in an independent film, he moved to California to pursue an acting career. His character delivers a love letter to Carla Tortelli (Rhea Perlman) from her deceased former lover, Eddie LaBec, in the Cheers episode, "Death Takes a Holiday on Ice". He played the part of slow-witted aircraft mechanic Lowell Mather for six seasons (1990–95) on the NBC sitcom Wings.

He worked in television for two more seasons, with a lead role in Ned and Stacey opposite Debra Messing. He has had supporting roles in films such as Tombstone, George of the Jungle, The Specials, and Demon Knight.

Church bought a ranch in Texas in 1998. In late 2000, he took a break from films. After having small roles in films such as Monkeybone and 3000 Miles to Graceland, he made his directorial debut with Rolling Kansas in 2003. He has voiceover work in commercials, such as for Merrill Lynch and Icehouse beer.

In 2003, director Alexander Payne called him regarding the role of Jack, the selfish best friend of Paul Giamatti's character, in Sideways. During the audition, Church stripped naked to read the audition scene, later saying "To me, it was painfully obvious... I was reading the scene where Jack comes in naked and there has to be in-born vulnerability in the scene." (He later found that he was the only actor to strip down for the audition). Sideways earned acclaim for Church; he won an IFP Independent Spirit Award and was nominated for the Academy Award for Best Supporting Actor.

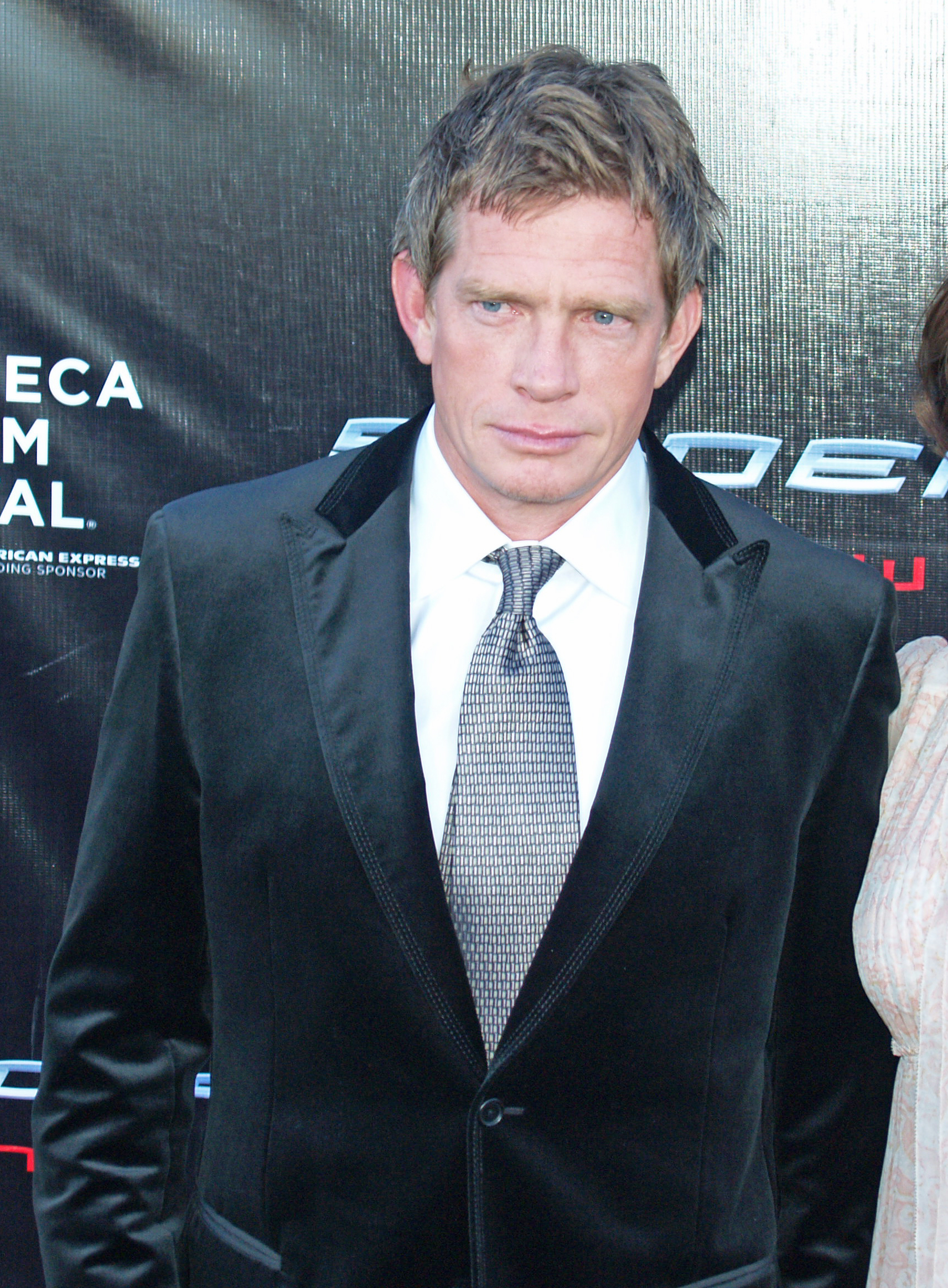
Church at the Spider-Man 3 (2007) premiere in New York City

He has since appeared in films such as Idiocracy, done voice-over work on films such as Over the Hedge and starred in one of AMC's highest rated television productions, Broken Trail, with Robert Duvall, in 2006, for which he won an Emmy. In 2007, he appeared as the villain Sandman in Sam Raimi's Spider-Man 3 starring Tobey Maguire and Kirsten Dunst. He received praise for his portrayal of the character. Although he was not present on set he lent his voice to Sandman (digitally created) for the Marvel Cinematic Universe (MCU) film Spider-Man: No Way Home, which was released in 2021 and linked both the Raimi and Marc Webb franchises to the MCU. Archival footage from Spider-Man 3 was used to show his human form at the end of the film where Jon Watts provided the motion-capture for Sandman.

In 2005, he was invited to join the Academy of Motion Picture Arts and Sciences. In October 2008, Church appeared as "Joe Six-Pack" in a video on funnyordie.com, challenging Joe the Plumber to a beer-drinking contest. Church starred in the FEARnet webseries, Zombie Roadkill, alongside David Dorfman. From 2016 to 2019 he costarred in all three seasons of the HBO original series Divorce.

In December 2021, it was announced that Church will star alongside Toni Collette and Anna Faris in the comedy film The Estate, directed by Dean Craig, however he did not appear in the final film.

In March 2023, he played Lloyd in Acidman.

== Personal life ==
Church lives on his 2,000-acre (810 ha) ranch near Kerrville, Texas and also owns a ranch near Lost Maples State Natural Area in the Texas Hill Country. During the filming of Divorce, he rented a house in New Rochelle, New York. He has two children from a former relationship with Mia Zottoli. Church has never married. Church's father, Carl, died in 2008, and his stepfather, George, died in 2012.

== Filmography ==
=== Film ===
| Year | Title | Role | Notes |
|---|---|---|---|
| 1990 | Gypsy Angels | Roommate | 1989 version; uncredited |
| 1993 | Tombstone | Billy Clanton | |
| 1995 | Demon Knight | Roach | |
| 1997 | George of the Jungle | Lyle Van de Groot | |
| 1997 | One Night Stand | Don | |
| 1998 | Susan's Plan | Dr. Chris Stillman | |
| 1998 | Free Money | Larry Lundstrom | |
| 1999 | Goosed | Steven Troy | |
| 2000 | The Specials | The Strobe | |
| 2001 | 3000 Miles to Graceland | US Marshal Quigley | |
| 2001 | Monkeybone | Death's Assistant | Uncredited |
| 2002 | Lone Star State of Mind | Killer | |
| 2002 | The Badge | David Hardwick | |
| 2003 | Rolling Kansas | Agent Madsen / Trooper | Uncredited; Also writer and director |
| 2003 | George of the Jungle 2 | Lyle Van de Groot | Direct-to-video |
| 2004 | Serial Killing 4 Dummys | Vince Grimaldi | |
| 2004 | Sideways | Jack Cole | |
| 2004 | Spanglish | Mike | |
| 2006 | Over the Hedge | Dwayne | Voice |
| 2006 | Idiocracy | Brawndo CEO | |
| 2006 | Charlotte's Web | Brooks | Voice |
| 2007 | Spider-Man 3 | Flint Marko / Sandman | |
| 2008 | Smart People | Chuck Wetherhold | |
| 2009 | Don McKay | Don McKay | Also executive producer |
| 2009 | Imagine That | Johnny Whitefeather | |
| 2009 | Aliens in the Attic | Tazer | Voice |
| 2009 | All About Steve | Hartman | |
| 2010 | Easy A | Mr. Griffith | |
| 2011 | Another Happy Day | Paul | |
| 2011 | Killer Joe | Ansel Smith | |
| 2011 | We Bought a Zoo | Duncan Mee | |
| 2012 | John Carter | Tal Hajus | |
| 2013 | Whitewash | Bruce Landry | |
| 2013 | Lucky Them | Charlie | |
| 2014 | Heaven Is for Real | Jay Wilkins | |
| 2015 | Max | Ray Wincott | |
| 2015 | Daddy's Home | Leo Holt | |
| 2016 | Cardboard Boxer | Willie | |
| 2017 | Crash Pad | Grady Dott | |
| 2019 | The Peanut Butter Falcon | Clint / The Salt Water Redneck | |
| 2019 | Hellboy | Lobster Johnson | |
| 2020 | The 24th | Col. Norton | |
| 2021 | Spider-Man: No Way Home | Flint Marko / Sandman | Voice, live-action appearance via archive footage |
| 2022 | Acidman | Lloyd | |
| 2023 | Accidental Texan | Merle Luskey | |
| 2024 | Horizon: An American Saga – Chapter 2 | TBA | |
| 2025 | Wake Up Dead Man | Samson Holt | |
| TBA | Horizon: An American Saga – Chapter 3 | TBA | Filming |

=== Television ===
| Year | Title | Role | Notes |
|---|---|---|---|
| 1989 | Protect and Surf | Dwight Jesmer | Television film |
| 1989 | 21 Jump Street | Tony | Episode: "Eternal Flame" |
| 1989 | Cheers | Gordie Brown | Episode: "Death Takes a Holiday on Ice" |
| 1989 | China Beach | Jack Daniels | Episode: "China Man" |
| 1989 | Booker | Leon Ross | 2 episodes |
| 1990–1995 | Wings | Lowell Mather | 123 episodes |
| 1992 | Flying Blind | Jonathan | 2 episodes |
| 1993 | Fugitive Nights: Danger in the Desert | Nelson Hareem | Television film |
| 1995–1997 | Ned and Stacey | Ned Dorsey | 46 episodes |
| 1995 | Partners | Ned Dorsey | Episode: "City Hall" |
| 1998 | Mr. Murder | Drew Oslett Jr. | Television film |
| 2001 | Gary & Mike | Additional voices | Episode: "Washington D.C." |
| 2001 | The Cartoon Cartoon Show | Doo Dah (voice) | Episode: "Yee Hah & Doo Dah: Bronco Breakin' Boots" |
| 2001 | Going to California | Schwee | Episode: "Apocalypse Cow" |
| 2003 | Miss Match | Andrew Horn | Episode: "Matchmaker, Matchmaker; Uncredited |
| 2003 | Lucky | Bobby Blaine | Episode: "The Method" |
| 2004 | Teen Titans | Killer Moth (voice) | Episode: "Date with Destiny" |
| 2006 | Broken Trail | Tom Harte | Television miniseries; 2 episodes |
| 2010 | Zombie Roadkill | Ranger Chet Masterson | Television miniseries; 6 episodes |
| 2012 | Regular Show | Quillgin (voice) | Episode: "The Christmas Special" |
| 2016–2019 | Divorce | Robert Dufresne | 24 episodes; Also executive producer |
| 2021 | Nature | Narrator | Episode: "Big Bend: The Wild Frontier of Texas" |
| 2023 | Fired on Mars | Trevor Sullivan (voice) | 2 episodes |
| 2023 | Twisted Metal | Agent Stone | Main role |
| 2025 | Tires | Phil | Season 2 - present |

=== Video games ===
| Year | Title | Voice role | Notes |
|---|---|---|---|
| 1990 | Ys | Goban Toba | English dub; Credited as Thomas H. Church |
| 2007 | Spider-Man 3 | Flint Marko / Sandman | |

== Awards and nominations ==
Church has received multiple awards and nominations for his roles in both television and film. He earned an Academy Award nomination for Best Supporting Actor in 2005 for his role as Jack in Sideways (2004), two Golden Globe Award nominations for Best Supporting Actor in 2004 for the film Sideways (2004) and Best Supporting Actor in 2007 for the miniseries Broken Trail (2006), won a Primetime Emmy Award for Outstanding Supporting Actor in a Limited or Anthology Series or Movie in 2007 for Broken Trail (2006), and won one of three Screen Actors Guild Award nominations in 2005 for Screen Actors Guild Award for Outstanding Performance by a Cast in a Motion Picture for Sideways (2004).

| Year | Title | Accolade | Results | Ref |
|---|---|---|---|---|
| 2004 | Sideways | Award Circuit Community Award, Best Supporting Actor | Nominated | |
| 2004 | Sideways | Award Circuit Community Award, Best Cast Ensemble | Won | |
| 2004 | Sideways | Boston Society Film Critics Award, Best Supporting Actor | Won | |
| 2004 | Sideways | Boston Society Film Critics Award, Best Cast Ensemble | Won | |
| 2004 | Sideways | Chicago Film Critics Association Award, Best Supporting Actor | Won | |
| 2004 | Sideways | Florida Film Critics Circle Award, Best Supporting Actor | Won | |
| 2004 | Sideways | Golden Schmoes Award, Best Supporting Actor of the Year | Nominated | |
| 2004 | Sideways | Kansas City Film Critics Circle Award, Best Supporting Actor | Won | |
| 2004 | Sideways | Los Angeles Film Critics Association Award, Best Supporting Actor | Won | |
| 2004 | Sideways | National Board of Review Award, Best Supporting Actor | Won | |
| 2004 | Sideways | New York Film Critics Circle Award, Best Supporting Actor | Nominated | |
| 2004 | Sideways | New York Film Critics Online Award, Best Supporting Actor | Won | |
| 2004 | Sideways | Phoenix Film Critics Society Award, Best Supporting Actor | Won | |
| 2004 | Sideways | Phoenix Film Critics Society Award, Best Ensemble Acting | Won | |
| 2004 | Sideways | San Francisco Film Critics Circle Award, Best Supporting Actor | Won | |
| 2004 | Sideways | Seattle Film Critics Award, Best Supporting Actor | Won | |
| 2004 | Sideways | Southeastern Film Critics Association Award, Best Supporting Actor | Won | |
| 2004 | Sideways | St. Louis Film Critics Association Award, Best Supporting Actor | Won | |
| 2004 | Sideways | Utah Film Critics Association Award, Best Supporting Actor | Nominated | |
| 2004 | Sideways | Village Voice Film Poll Award, Best Supporting Performance | Nominated | |
| 2004 | Sideways | Washing D.C. Area Film Critics Association Award, Best Supporting Actor | Nominated | |
| 2005 | Sideways | Academy Award, Best Supporting Actor | Nominated | |
| 2005 | Sideways | Critics Choice Award, Best Supporting Actor | Won | |
| 2005 | Sideways | Critics Choice Award, Best Ensemble | Nominated | |
| 2005 | Sideways | Dallas-Fort Worth Film Critics Association Award, Best Supporting Actor | Won | |
| 2005 | Sideways | Gold Derby Award, Best Supporting Actor | Nominated | |
| 2005 | Sideways | Gold Derby Award, Best Ensemble | Nominated | |
| 2005 | Sideways | Golden Globe Award, Best Supporting Actor in a Motion Picture | Nominated | |
| 2005 | Sideways | Independent Spirit Award, Best Supporting Male | Won | |
| 2005 | Sideways | International Online Cinema Award, Best Supporting Actor | Nominated | |
| 2005 | Sideways | Iowa Film Critics Award, Best Supporting Actor | Won | |
| 2005 | Sideways | National Society of Film Critics Award, Best Supporting Actor | Won | |
| 2005 | Sideways | Online Film & Television Association Award, Best Breakthrough Performance – Male | Won | |
| 2005 | Sideways | Online Film & Television Association Award, Best Supporting Actor | Nominated | |
| 2005 | Sideways | Online Film Critics Society Award, Best Supporting Actor | Won | |
| 2005 | Sideways | Satellite Award, Best Supporting Actor in a Motion Picture, Comedy or Musical | Won | |
| 2005 | Sideways | Screen Actors Guild Award, Outstanding Performance by a Male Actor in a Supporting Role | Nominated | |
| 2005 | Sideways | Screen Actors Guild Award, Outstanding Performance by an Ensemble in a Motion Picture | Won | |
| 2005 | Sideways | Vancouver Film Critics Circle Award, Best Supporting Actor | Nominated | |
| 2007 | Broken Trail | Gold Derby Award, Best Lead Actor in a Television Movie/Miniseries | Nominated | |
| 2007 | Broken Trail | Golden Globe Award, Best Supporting Actor in a Series, Miniseries or Motion Picture Made for Television | Nominated | |
| 2007 | Broken Trail | Monte-Carlo Television Festival Award, Mini-Series – Best Performance by an Actor | Nominated | |
| 2007 | Broken Trail | Online Film & Television Association Award, Best Supporting Actor in a Motion Picture or Miniseries | Won | |
| 2007 | Broken Trail | Primetime Emmy Award, Outstanding Supporting Actor in a Miniseries or Movie | Won | |
| 2007 | Broken Trail | Screen Actors Guild Award, Outstanding Performance by a Male Actor in a Television Movie or Miniseries | Nominated | |
| 2007 | Spider-Man 3 | Teen Choice Award, Choice Movie – Rumble (shared with Tobey Maguire, James Franco, Topher Grace) | Nominated | |
| 2007 | Broken Trail | Western Heritage Award, Outstanding Television Feature Film | Won | |
| 2014 | Whitewash | Vancouver Film Critics Circle Award, Best Actor in a Canadian Film | Nominated | |
