= Critical Assembly (film) =

- Written by: Tom Vaughan, Carla Kettner
- Directed by: Eric Laneuville
- Starring: Katherine Heigl
- Music by: Mark Snow
- Country of origin: United States
- Original language: English

Production
- Cinematography: Attila Szalay
- Editor: Jimmy Giritlian
- Running time: 120 minutes

Original release
- Release: July 12, 2003

Critical Assembly is a 2003 television film directed by Eric Laneuville. It stars Katherine Heigl and Kerr Smith.

== Plot ==
For political reasons, two college students build a nuclear device which is then stolen by another student. It ends up in the hands of a terrorist, so the device's creators team up with an FBI agent to find it.

== Cast ==
- Katherine Heigl as Aizy Hayward
- Kerr Smith as Bobby Damon
- J. August Richards as Allan Marshall
- Jeff Roop as Roger 'Stoop' Stupak
- Christopher Kennedy as Major Matt Crowl
- Michael Beach as FBI agent Winston
