= Mimics (film) =

2025 American film by Kristoffer Polaha

- Theatrical release poster
- Directed by: Kristoffer Polaha
- Written by: Marc Oakley
- Produced by: Ken Carpenter; Adam Karm; Kristoffer Polaha; Ben Wagner
- Starring: Kristoffer Polaha; Mōriah; Stephen Tobolowsky
- Cinematography: Alexander Yellen
- Edited by: Barrie Wise
- Music by: Benjamin Backus
- Production companies: Nook Lane Entertainment; Podunk Productions
- Distributed by: Panoramic Pictures
- Release dates: September 25, 2025 (Cordillera International Film Festival); February 13, 2026 (United States)
- Running time: 90 minutes
- Country: United States
- Language: English

Mimics is a 2025 American horror comedy film directed and co-produced by Kristoffer Polaha, who also stars in the film alongside Mōriah, Chris Parnell, and Stephen Tobolowsky. Its plot follows Sam Reinhold (Polaha), an impressionist who makes a pact with a living ventriloquist dummy named Fergus for fame and success, resulting in grim consequences.

Mimics premiered at the Cordillera International Film Festival in Sparks, Nevada on September 25, 2025. The film was theatrically released by Panoramic Pictures on February 13, 2026.

== Plot ==
Sam Reinhold is a struggling impressionist working at a grocery store while pursuing an unsuccessful comedy career. Despite support from his grandfather, Melvin, and his coworker and love interest, Virginia Martin, Sam becomes desperate for fame. He accepts an offer from a mysterious agency and receives Fergus, a ventriloquist dummy promised to make him successful.

Fergus can speak and move independently, and Sam’s performances quickly become popular. However, the dummy becomes controlling and increasingly acts as the real star. People who insult Sam, interfere with his career or attempt to separate him from Fergus begin suffering violent accidents. As Sam’s fame grows, his relationships with Virginia and Melvin deteriorate, while the agency pressures him to accept every performance.

Sam eventually discovers that Fergus is part of a system that exploits ambitious entertainers and takes control of their lives. Realizing that his success is endangering those around him, Sam rejects the agency and refuses to perform again. During a final confrontation, he cuts Fergus’s strings and destroys the dummy, apparently ending its control over him.

Sam gives up his career but regains control of his life. However, the final scene shows another box being delivered to a new performer, revealing that the agency remains active and the cycle will continue.

== Cast ==
- Kristoffer Polaha as Sam Reinhold
- Moriah as Virginia Martin
- Stephen Tobolowsky as Melvin Reinhold
- Chris Parnell as Jack Conrad
- Jason Berreth as Walter
- Jason Marsden as Dom Fletcher
- Jesse Hutch as Robert Van Sickle
- Kevin Lawson as Emcee Clifton
- Arianne Zucker as The Madam
- Micah Max Polaha as Riley Conrad
- Austin Basis as Emcee Tony
- Megan Tingle as Sara
- Marc Oakley as Spam Caller
- Ken Carpenter as Eulogizer
- Lydia De Souza as Beth
- David Gamble Jr. as Desmond Villanueve
- Holly Lorge as Judy
- Kenneth Anglemire as Floor manager
- Melody Ricketts as Connie Swanson
- Nick Josten as Layne Brown

== Release ==
The film was premiered at Cordillera International Film Festival on September 25, 2025, and had its limited release on February 13, 2026, under ArtAffects Entertainment and Panoramic Pictures.
