= Quinn Fabray =

Fictional character from the Fox series Glee

- Glee character
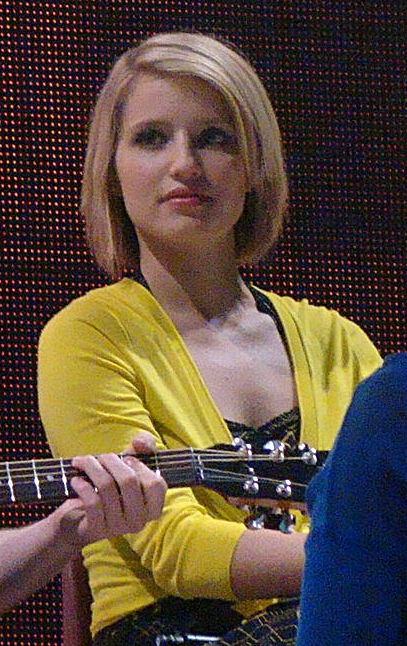
- Dianna Agron portraying Quinn Fabray
- First appearance: "Pilot" (2009)
- Last appearance: "Dreams Come True" (2015)
- Created by: Ryan Murphy; Brad Falchuk; Ian Brennan
- Portrayed by: Dianna Agron

In-universe information
- Full name: Lucy Quinn Fabray
- Occupation: College student
- Family: Russell Fabray (father); Judy Fabray (mother); Frannie Fabray (sister)
- Significant others: Noah Puckerman (fling; father of her child); Finn Hudson (ex-partner, deceased); Sam Evans (ex-partner)
- Children: Beth Fabray (biological daughter; given up at birth)
- Religion: Christian

Quinn Fabray is a fictional character from the TV series Glee. The character is portrayed by actress Dianna Agron, and has appeared in Glee from its pilot episode, first broadcast on May 19, 2009. She is the cheerleading captain at the fictional William McKinley High School in Lima, Ohio, as well as a member of the school's glee club. In the first episode, Quinn is introduced as an antagonistic queen bee stock character. She joins the school glee club to spy on her boyfriend Finn Hudson (Cory Monteith) and becomes a spy for cheerleading coach Sue Sylvester (Jane Lynch); she remains part of the club after she is removed from the cheerleading team, the "Cheerios", due to her pregnancy. Over the course of the first season, her character matures and builds friendships with the other outcasts who make up the glee club. Quinn gives birth at the end of the first season to a baby girl, Beth, whom she gives up for adoption. Quinn was 16 years old when she had her baby.

In the second season, she forms a bond with newcomer Sam Evans (Chord Overstreet), and later romances her first boyfriend Finn, reigniting her animosity with club co-captain Rachel Berry (Lea Michele). In the third season, Quinn intends to get full custody of her daughter, Beth, and attempts to prove that Shelby Corcoran (Idina Menzel) — the adoptive mother of Beth — is an unfit parent; eventually, she realizes that Beth is better off with Shelby. Quinn subsequently receives a college acceptance letter from Yale, and while driving to Finn and Rachel's wedding, her car is struck by a truck and she suffers a spinal injury that requires her to use a wheelchair for many weeks. She is eventually able to walk again.

Quinn was developed by Glee creators Ryan Murphy, Brad Falchuk and Ian Brennan. The last character to be cast, initial responses to her were positive, though they soured during season one as the pregnancy storyline continued. Songs performed by Agron as Quinn have been released as singles, available for download, and also feature on the show's soundtrack albums. The role saw Agron nominated for the Teen Choice Award for "Breakout Female Star" in 2009, and a Screen Actors Guild award that same year. She was initially described by Agron as Rachel's enemy, and "terrible, the meanest girl".

== Storylines ==
=== Season 1 ===
Quinn is introduced as the captain of the cheerleading squad (The Cheerios) at William McKinley High School, coached by Sue Sylvester (Jane Lynch). She comes from a conservative Christian family, and is president of the celibacy club. When her boyfriend Finn Hudson (Cory Monteith) joins the glee club, New Directions, Quinn worries about his interaction with the group's star, Rachel Berry (Lea Michele), and joins New Directions herself along with her fellow Cheerios Santana Lopez (Naya Rivera) and Brittany Pierce (Heather Morris). Sue then enlists the three of them to help her destroy the glee club from the inside.

Upon discovering that she is pregnant, Quinn convinces Finn that he is the father, despite the fact that they never actually had sex. Quinn claims that Finn had prematurely ejaculated into her while they were making out in a hot tub. The real father is Finn's best friend Noah "Puck" Puckerman (Mark Salling); he offers to support Quinn and the baby, but she rejects him, saying he is too irresponsible to care for a child. Quinn decides to put the baby up for adoption, and agrees to give it to Terri Schuester (Jessalyn Gilsig), the wife of glee club director Will Schuester (Matthew Morrison), who is faking a pregnancy. When news of her pregnancy is revealed to the school, Quinn is cut from the cheerleading squad and her popularity declines. Her parents kick her out of their house, and she moves in with Finn and his mother. She begins to reconsider giving up the baby, and gives Puck a chance to prove himself, but he is not reliable so she returns to her plan of giving the baby to Terri. Quinn blackmails Sue into letting her rejoin the Cheerios, but ultimately decides against it, preferring to remain with the glee club, where she feels accepted.

Finn learns the truth about the baby's paternity from Rachel, and breaks up with Quinn. Puck again offers to support her, but she turns him down and tells him that she wants to handle the pregnancy by herself. She moves in with Puck's family, but after forming a friendship with fellow New Directions member Mercedes Jones (Amber Riley), Quinn lives with her family instead. She gives birth to a daughter, named Beth by Puck, who is adopted by Shelby Corcoran (Idina Menzel), coach of rival glee club Vocal Adrenaline and Rachel's biological mother.

Having a main character on a popular show with a teen pregnancy storyline turned the phenomenon into a trend in 2010, with other programs and products following.

=== Season 2 ===
At the beginning of the new school year, Quinn is reinstated as head cheerleader. She begins dating new glee club member Sam Evans (Chord Overstreet), and later accepts a promise ring from him. When Sue forces Quinn, Santana and Brittany to choose between cheerleading and the glee club, all three initially go with the Cheerios to retain their popularity, but are later convinced by Finn to defect to New Directions. Quinn cheats on Sam with Finn, and Sam dumps Quinn after she lies to him about her time with Finn. She and Finn reunite, and Quinn starts campaigning for junior prom king and queen elections. Lauren Zizes (Ashley Fink), Puck's new girlfriend and one of Quinn's rivals for prom queen, discovers that before transferring to McKinley High, Quinn was known by her first name, Lucy. She was overweight and unpopular, and after slimming down and having rhinoplasty, reinvented herself as Quinn, using her middle name. At prom, Finn is thrown out for fighting with Rachel's date Jesse St. James (Jonathan Groff). Quinn is not named prom queen, and blames Rachel for her loss. She slaps her, but immediately regrets it and apologizes. Finn later breaks up with Quinn when he realizes he has a deeper connection with Rachel.

=== Season 3 ===
At the start of her senior year, Quinn has completely reinvented herself and refuses to rejoin either the Cheerios or New Directions, although when New Directions performs "You Can't Stop The Beat" in the auditorium Quinn can be seen watching them with a conflicted look on her face. Shelby lets Puck see Beth, but rejects Quinn's desire to do likewise due to Quinn's bad-girl attitude, appearance and behavior. After seeing a picture of a happy Beth and Puck, Quinn resumes her normal appearance, and Will and the New Directions welcome her back into the club, but Quinn reveals to Puck she is only pretending to behave in order to take Beth back from Shelby, and intends to pursue full custody. After Puck tells Shelby of Quinn's true intentions, Shelby informs Quinn that she does not want her in Beth's life. Quinn later reveals a desire to have a second baby with Puck. Puck refuses, and tries to comfort her; he offers to share an important secret if she promises not to tell anyone, which ultimately results in Quinn planning to get Shelby fired for sleeping with a student, Puck. Quinn decides not to reveal Shelby's secret for Beth's sake.

Quinn advises Rachel to refuse Finn's marriage proposal and leave her past behind. Quinn has done so, and she has been accepted at Yale. Quinn asks Sue to allow her to rejoin the Cheerios, but Sue refuses. However, following Regionals, she changes her mind. Quinn also changes her mind about Finn and Rachel's marriage and supports it. Rachel is reluctant to start the subsequent wedding without Quinn, and texts Quinn. Quinn is responding to Rachel's text when a truck crashes into the driver's side of her car.

Quinn's car accident has left her in a wheelchair, suffering from a severely compressed spine. By "Prom-asaurus" she is able to stand and to walk a few steps in the sessions. When Quinn is nominated for prom queen, Finn agrees to campaign with her, but is outraged when he discovers that she has been hiding the fact that she can now stand for the sympathy vote. When Quinn and Santana count the votes, they discover that Finn has won and so has Quinn. Quinn realizes that the victory means nothing. She and Santana falsely report the prom queen results as a write-in victory for Rachel. Her recovery is rapid enough to allow her to dance in the "Nationals" competition episode, which New Directions wins. Quinn helps Puck study for the test he needs to pass in order to graduate. She tells him that with all they went through, they are bonded for life, and she kisses him. Emboldened, Puck passes his test. Later, Quinn returns her cheerleading uniform to Sue, and the two have a tearful farewell.

=== Season 4 ===
Quinn returns to Lima for Thanksgiving in the eighth episode of the season, and helps to mentor the new members of New Directions as they prepare for Sectionals competition. Quinn is partnered with Kitty Wilde (Becca Tobin). Kitty convinces Quinn, whom she idolizes, that Jake Puckerman (Jacob Artist), Puck's half brother, is pressuring Marley into having sex with him. Quinn becomes hostile towards Jake, Santana confronts Quinn about having discovered that Kitty has given Marley laxatives in order to further Marley's bulimia. Quinn, who is dating one of her teachers at Yale, accuses Santana of being jealous of her and projecting her hostility in their surrogates, leading to a fight before Quinn storms out of the choir room. Quinn travels to New York to give Rachel helpful advice over whether or not to do a nude scene in a short film in "Naked". Quinn returns to Lima for Will and Emma's wedding in "I Do", and evidently single again, vents her frustrations about men. During the wedding reception, Quinn flirts with Santana and eventually seduces her. After they have sex, they agree it was a fun one-time, and then two time, experimentation for Quinn.

=== Season 5 ===
Quinn returns to Lima with a new boyfriend, Biff, for the special 100th episode. Puck is jealous of their relationship, because he still loves her. Quinn is lying to him because she does not want him to know about her past yet. Puck convinces her to tell Biff the truth, which she does. Biff insults her, which causes a fight between Puck and Biff. They later break-up. Puck and Quinn talk about Finn and their relationship, and she realises that she still loves him. They later start a relationship again, which is later confirmed in the next episode after Quinn and Puck perform a duet of Pink and Nate Ruess's Just Give Me a Reason to the glee club.

=== Season 6 ===
Quinn along with the New Directions alumni return in the episode "Homecoming" to help Rachel and Kurt rebuild the New Directions. Quinn, Santana, and Brittany attempt to recruit new members by performing in Cheerios Alumni outfits, but only recruit twins Mason and Madison when former Glee new member, Kitty, who was the only member not to be transferred as Sue saw her as a star player, announced she wouldn't return because of the way Artie treated her and everyone else when he left. Puck is still her boyfriend. She appears in "Jagged Little Tapestry" along with Tina to help Becky convince her new boyfriend that she is in every club of the school. Quinn, Tina, Sue, and Coach Roz get a huge surprise when they find out that Becky's boyfriend, Darrell, does not have Down syndrome like Becky does. They all get a big lesson when they confront him and realize that a person with Down syndrome should be treated like everyone else. Despite being Santana and Brittany's best friend, she is notably absent during their wedding in "A Wedding". She returns in the last minutes of the series finale "Dreams Come True" performing backing vocals for "I Lived" with the rest of the Glee Cast for the re-dedication of the Auditorium.

== Development ==
=== Casting and creation ===
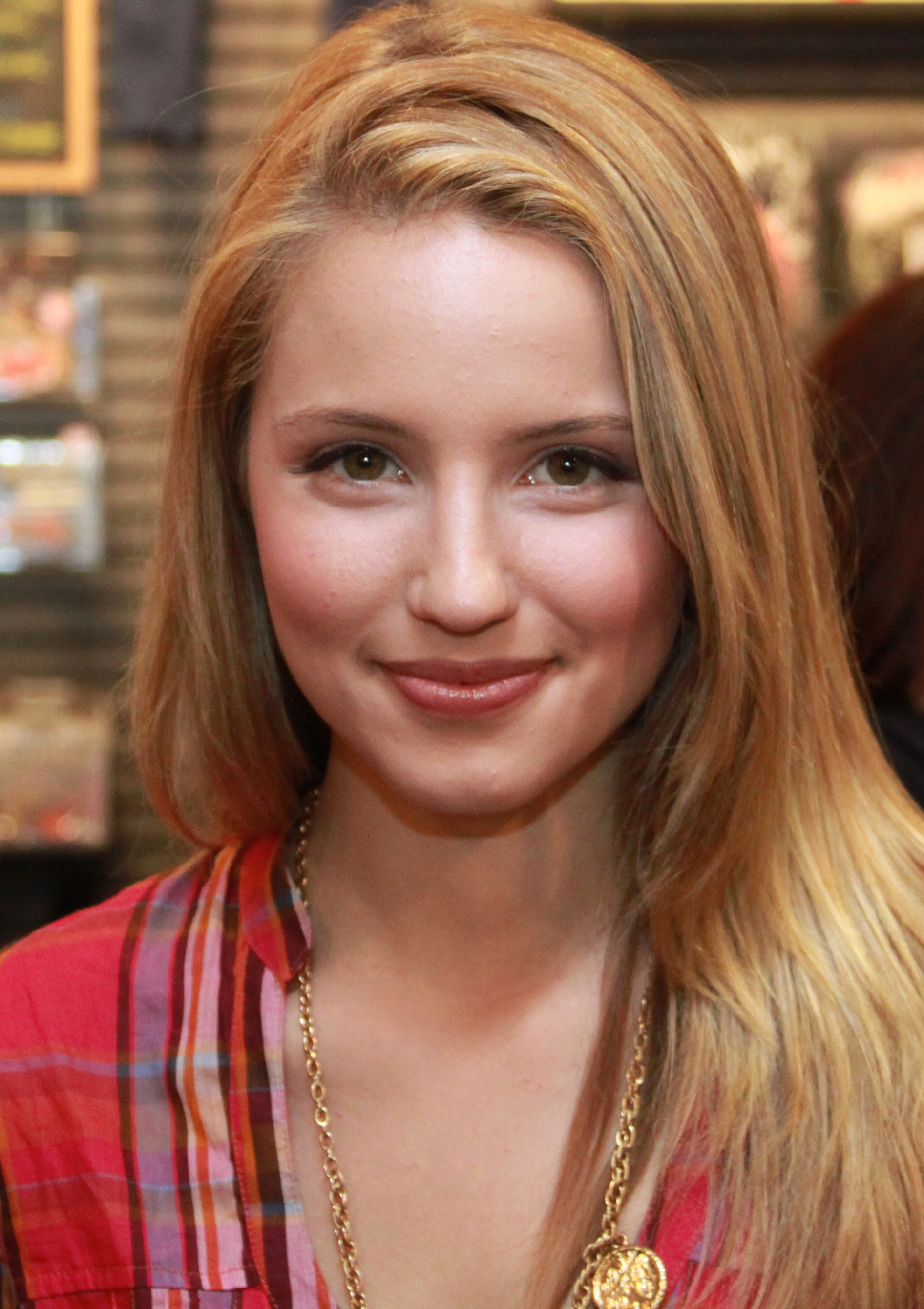
Dianna Agron (pictured) plays Quinn.

Quinn is portrayed by actress Dianna Agron. In casting Glee, series creator Ryan Murphy sought out actors who could identify with the rush of starring in theatrical roles. Instead of using traditional network casting calls, he spent three months on Broadway looking for unknown actors. Agron was the last primary actor to be cast, having won the role only days before the pilot began filming. Agron auditioned for Glee coming from a background in dancing and acting. She has been taking dance classes since the age of three, appeared in many music theatre productions and has appeared in television roles for Skidmarks, CSI: NY, and Heroes. Agron said in a 2009 interview pertaining to her casting session: "I nearly bailed on my audition for the show. I was so nervous". With her wholesome good looks, Agron certainly looked the part, but the producers wondered if she appeared too innocent. Agron said in an interview: "They told me to come back with straight hair and to dress sexier. Later that week, I started work." Agron auditioned with Frank Sinatra's "Fly Me to the Moon". The Glee producers said "we really lucked out in finding Agron to play Quinn".

In December 2010, Ryan Murphy announced that the cast of Glee would be replaced at the end of the third season to coincide with their graduation. Murphy said: "Every year we're going to populate a new group. There's nothing more depressing than a high schooler with a bald spot." He also revealed that some of the original cast will leave as early as 2012: "I think you have to be true to the fact that here is a group of people who come and go in these teachers' lives." Although four graduating seniors were confirmed in January 2012 as returning in the fourth season—Rachel, Finn, Kurt and Santana—there had been no announcement regarding Quinn or any other seniors as of the end of February 2012. As of May 2012, Murphy stated that all graduating seniors will come back for season 4 but, not all will be doing "all 22 episodes".

=== Characterization ===
Quinn is described by Agron as Rachel Berry's (Lea Michele) enemy, and "terrible, the meanest girl". Agron said that her favorite part of Quinn is that "she's smart. But she's also human, and through her tough exterior, she's often a little girl lost." Interviewmagazine.com's Lauren Waterman has described her as being "lovable, but occasionally a manipulative deposed queen bee." Agron commented: "Yes, there is a stereotype with these characters and it wouldn't be fair if [those stereotypes] didn't exist a little bit. But [co-creator] Ryan Murphy has a way of taking everything and turning it upside down. That's the great thing about this show and these characters: nobody is one note, which is amazing." Quinn was originally conceived as the antagonistic queen bee head cheerleader, a departure from Agron's actual high school experience. Agron said in an interview with HitFix: "I definitely wasn't cool in high school. I really wasn't. I did belong to many of the clubs and was in leadership on yearbook and did the musical theater route, so I had friends in all areas, but I certainly did not know what to wear, did not know how to do my hair, all those things." She added: "I think that it shows that regardless of who you are and what group you belong to, that there are so many emotions behind each person in high school. Sometimes with teens, writers or directors, anybody, short-changes them and makes them be simple, simple individuals, you're either the jock or the popular kid or the nerd. They don't show those shades. Everybody has those shades to them. This show, it really expands upon vulnerability and excitement and anger all the experiences that you probably actually go through in high school."

Quinn's role as head cheerleader is central to understanding her character. Agron said that she had never had any prior cheer experience before the Pilot. "If I had been [a cheerleader], I would've ended up on crutches," she told Emmy magazine. In an interview with HitFix she said, "I have new respect for the craft, because I slightly hurt myself during the pilot, coming down from one of the stunts. It's better now. I didn't tear something in my knee, but I strained it. Knees are very sensitive, I've learned. It's crazy, because I've been dancing since I was three on my toes and all these things. And you should never say this, but I've never injured myself ever. I'd seen gnarly injuries with dance and all these things. You shouldn't say that, though, because every day is an opportunity to fall, hurt yourself, so that was my experience."

== Reception ==
=== Critical response ===
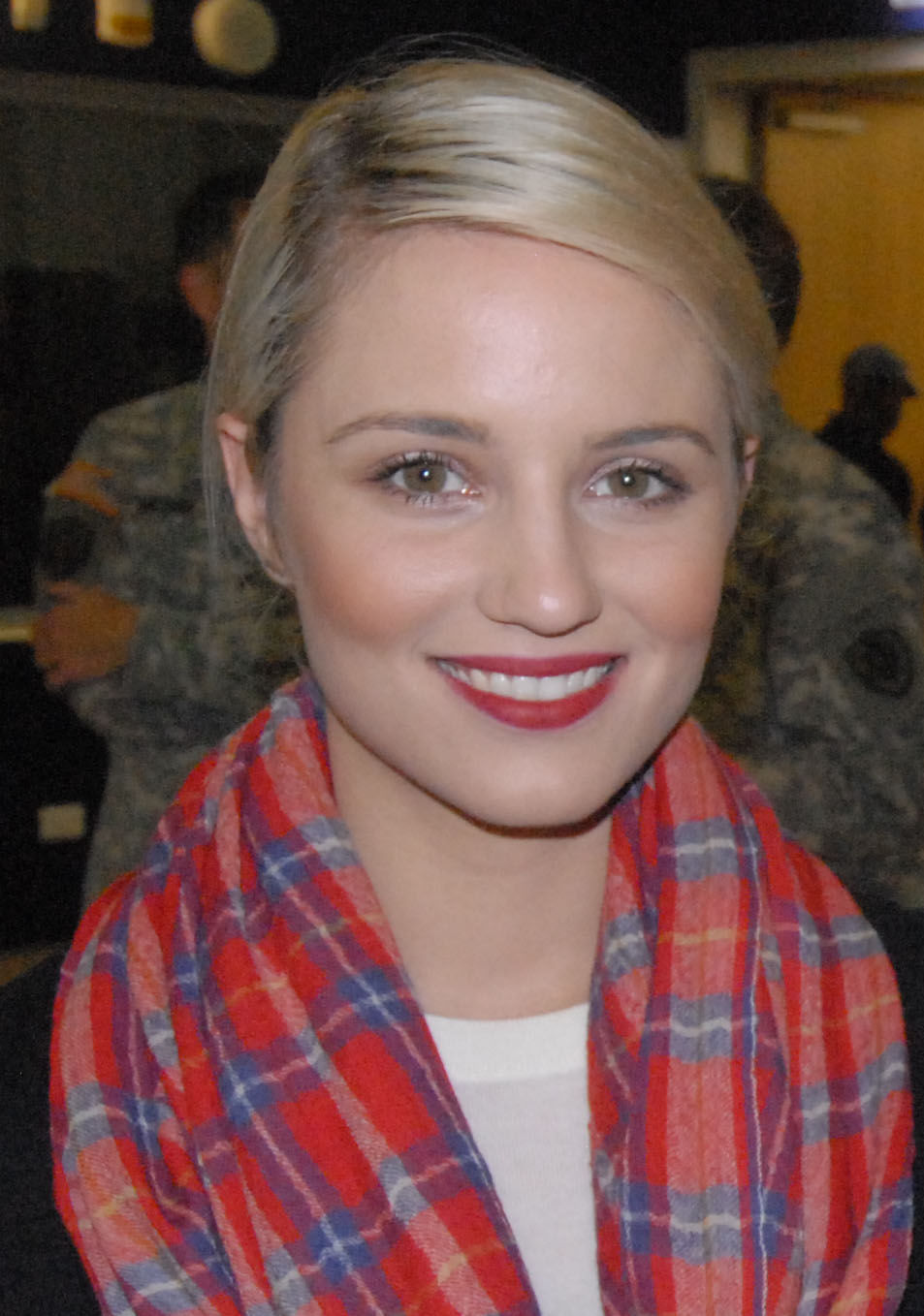
Quinn (Agron, pictured) has received positive reviews from critics.

Quinn has received positive reviews from critics. The role saw Agron nominated for the Teen Choice Award for "Female Breakout Star" in 2009. She and the other cast members were awarded the Screen Actors Guild Award for Outstanding Performance by an Ensemble in a Comedy Series in 2010, and nominated in the same category the following year.

The character's accidental pregnancy storyline received mixed reviews from critics. Tim Stack for Entertainment Weekly deemed it "a good dramatic twist", but hoped that it would not be a long-lasting storyline. Reviews of her storyline became increasingly negative, though Agron was praised for her dramatic acting during the confrontation scene with Quinn's parents in "Ballad". Gerrick D. Kennedy, writing for the Los Angeles Times, was critical of the ongoing pregnancy plot in the episode "Hairography", and noted that he cringed whenever Quinn appeared on screen. Conversely, Bobby Hankinson of the Houston Chronicle enjoyed Quinn in the episode, and wrote: "I love that she can keep her Mean Girls edge while being heartbreakingly sad or as joyful as she was singing "Papa Don't Preach". Reviewing the episode "Journey to Regionals", Entertainment Weekly's Darren Franich called Quinn's birthing scenes—interspersed with Vocal Adrenaline performing Queen's "Bohemian Rhapsody"—both "brilliant" and "terrible". He wrote, "If nothing else, it was definitely the most visually arresting way to represent the birthing process I've ever seen outside of The Miracle of Life. But I kind of liked it. Somewhere, Freddie Mercury is nodding proudly, and saying, 'World, I forgive you for We Will Rock You.'"

Brett Berk, writing for Vanity Fair, was positive about the scripting of the Quinn character in the second-season premiere, now that the pregnancy storyline was over, and was happy to see the return of "evil Quinn". Joel Kelly of TV Squad criticized the decision to pair Quinn with Finn again in the Valentine's Day-oriented episode. He saw it as a regression of the characters, and commented: "Yes, it feels like Glee Classic, because the series started with the two of them together. But both of them have changed—Quinn more so than Finn—and having them dating again seems like they're going back to the days when Quinn was the icy lead Cheerio and Finn was the nice but dumb star quarterback."

Quinn's season three reinvention attracted mixed reviews. Lesley Goldberg of The Hollywood Reporter listed her change as a highlight of the episode, and hoped to see more of her new attitude. The Atlantic's Kevin Fallon called it "the most interesting thing Quinn has done since giving birth to a baby to the soundtrack of 'Bohemian Rhapsody'", but VanDerWerff suggested the development hinged on the fact the producers no longer knew how to utilize Agron.

She was ranked number 13 in AfterEllen's Top 50 Favorite Female TV Characters.

=== Musical performances ===
Several songs performed by Agron as Quinn have been released as singles, available for digital download, also featured on the show's soundtrack albums. Agron made her musical debut at the end of the episode "Showmance" where she performed Dionne Warwick's "I Say a Little Prayer". Quinn's next solo was in the episode "Throwdown", where she performed The Supremes' "You Keep Me Hangin' On". The song was released on Glee: The Music, Volume 1. Flandez deemed the cover of "Keep Holding On", the ensemble performance on the episode, an "emotionally satisfying showstopper", however was critical of Quinn's cover of "You Keep Me Hangin' On", which he called "thin and jarring". Aly Semigran of MTV observed that Quinn spontaneously bursting into song brought Glee "dangerously close to High School Musical territory". Agron later performed a solo in the episode "Hairography" singing Madonna's "Papa Don't Preach" after her father learns she is pregnant. This performance by Agron was released as a single. She performed a rendition of James Brown's "It's a Man's Man's Man's World" in the episode "Funk". CNN's Lisa Respers France was "slightly disturbed" by Quinn's "weird" performance of "It's a Man's Man's Man's World" using pregnant teenagers as backing dancers.

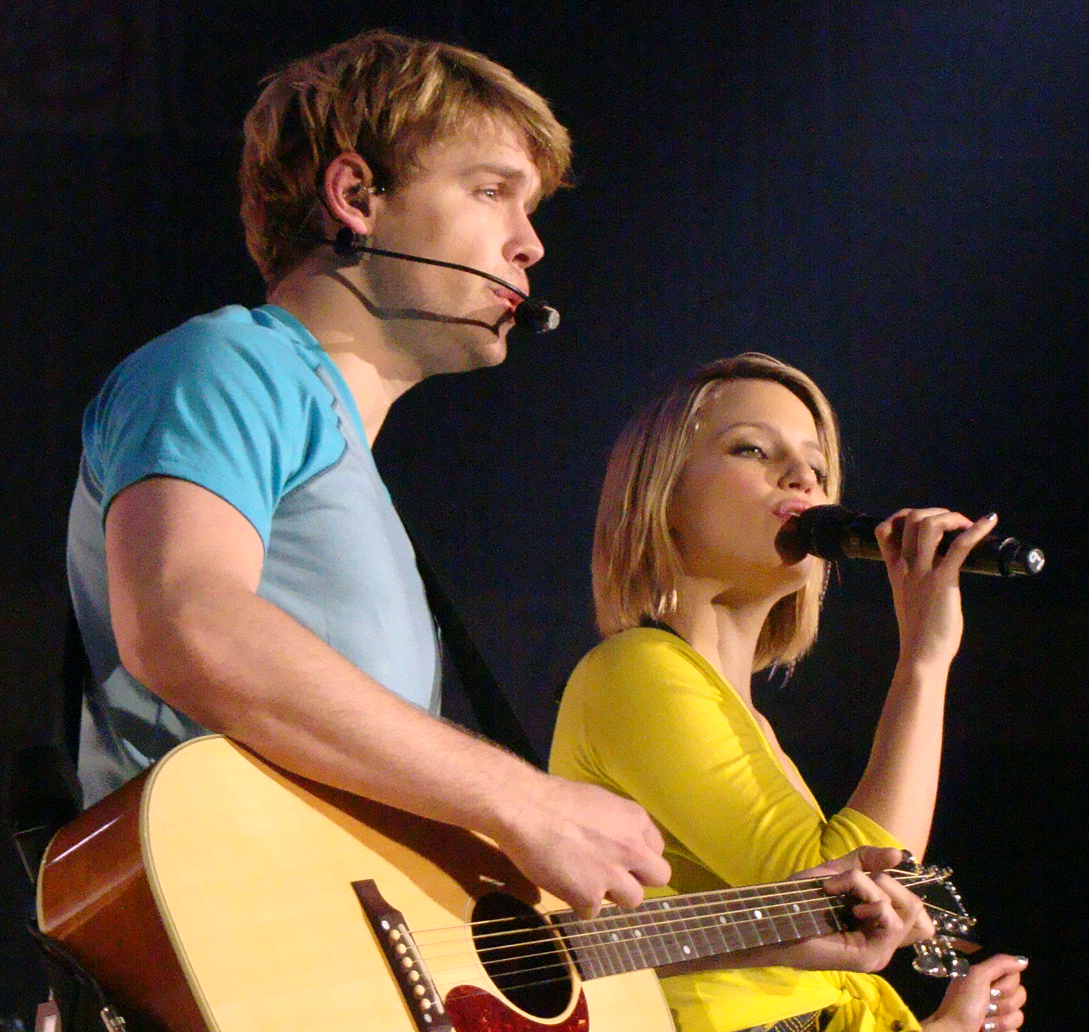
Quinn (right) was romantically linked with Sam Evans (left) early in the second season; they sang two duets together.

In season two, Quinn performs "Lucky" with Sam Evans in the episode "Duets", which was named by some critics as "the most impressive number of the evening"; others called it "absolutely fantastic" with particular praise for Agron, who was said to be often overlooked. "Lucky" debuted at number twenty-seven on the Billboard Hot 100; it was at number seventeen on the Billboard Canadian Hot 100. Quinn's duet performance with Rachel Berry (Lea Michele) of the mash-up "I Feel Pretty / Unpretty" was the highest charted single featured in the episode "Born This Way", debuting at number twenty-two on the Billboard Hot 100. It also peaked at number thirteen on the Digital 100 charts and sold 112,000 digital downloads in the United States in its first week of release. It was the highest charting Glee single on the Billboard charts since "Loser like Me", which debuted at number six on the Billboard Hot 100 and sold over 210,000 downloads in its first week.

In season three, Quinn sings her first solo number since the first season, "Never Can Say Goodbye" by The Jackson 5, which received mostly positive reviews. Jen Chaney of The Washington Post gave the song a "B−", and said it "worked much better than every track that preceded it" because it adapted the song to the show "instead of trying to out-Jackson Jackson". Entertainment Weekly's Joseph Brannigan Lynch called it "a nice summation of her character's journey, but not vocally impressive enough to justify listening to outside of the episode" and gave it a "B". Crystal Bell of HuffPost TV described it as a "blah performance", but Kate Stanhope of TV Guide said it was "sweet and reflective". Erica Futterman of Rolling Stone wrote that it was "a tune well-suited for Quinn's sultry voice and the flipped meaning she gives the lyrics", and TVLine's Michael Slezak had a similar take: he gave it an "A" and called it a "remarkably lovely fit" for her voice.

==== Charting singles ====
Charting singles released by Glee cast with Dianna Agron as a featured singer
Title	Year	Peak positions								Album
Title	Year	US Hot 100	UK	IRE	CAN Hot 100	AUS	SCOT	US Holiday	World Top 40	Album
"I Say a Little Prayer"	2009	—	125	—	—	—	—	—	—	Glee: The Music, Volume 1
"You Keep Me Hangin' On"	2009	(Note: "You Keep Me Hangin' On" did not enter the Billboard Hot 100, but did peak at number 23 on the Bubbling Under Hot 100 extension chart.)	166	—	—	—	—	—	—	Glee: The Music, Volume 1
"Papa Don't Preach"	2009	(Note: "Papa Don't Preach" did not enter the Billboard Hot 100, but did peak at number 21 on the Bubbling Under Hot 100 extension chart.)	81	—	(Note: "Papa Don't Preach" did not enter the Canadian Hot 100, but did peak at number 75 on the Canadian Digital Song Sales extension chart.)	—	58	—	—	Glee: The Music, The Complete Season One
"Express Yourself"	2010	(Note: "Express Yourself" did not enter the Billboard Hot 100, but did peak at number 16 on the Bubbling Under Hot 100 extension chart.)	132	—	—	—	—	—	—	Glee: The Music, The Power of Madonna
"Bad Romance"	2010	54	41	10	46	51	40	—	—	Glee: The Music, Volume 3 Showstoppers
"It's a Man's Man's Man's World"	2010	95	94	—	73	—	—	—	—	Glee: The Music, The Complete Season One
"One of Us"	2010	37	84	31	27	—	64	—	—	Glee: The Music, Volume 4
"Lucky"	2010	27	67	45	17	57	66	—	—	Glee: The Music, Volume 4
"Time Warp"	2010	89	63	42	52	70	46	—	—	Glee: The Music, The Rocky Horror Glee Show
"Start Me Up / Livin' on a Prayer"	2010	31	39	30	22	49	29	—	—	Glee: The Music, The Complete Season Two
"Marry You"	2010	32	51	31	19	27	42	—	—	Glee: The Music, Volume 4
"(I've Had) The Time of My Life"	2010	38	82	—	39	85	59	—	—	Glee: The Music, Volume 4
"God Rest Ye Merry Gentlemen"	2010	—	—	—	—	—	—	18	—	Glee: The Music, The Christmas Album
"Afternoon Delight" (featuring John Stamos)	2011	(Note: "Afternoon Delight" did not enter the Billboard Hot 100, but did peak at number 8 on the Bubbling Under Hot 100 extension chart.)	—	—	—	—	—	—	—	Glee: The Music, Volume 5
"I Feel Pretty / Unpretty"	2011	22	36	37	28	47	35	—	38	Glee: The Music, Volume 6
"I Don't Want to Know"	2011	(Note: "I Don't Want to Know" did not enter the Billboard Hot 100, but did peak at number 1 on the Bubbling Under Hot 100 extension chart.)	156	—	(Note: "I Don't Want to Know" did not enter the Canadian Hot 100, but did peak at number 65 on the Canadian Digital Song Sales chart.)	—	—	—	—	Glee: The Music, The Complete Season Two
"Don't Stop"	2011	79	104	—	65	—	—	—	—	Glee: The Music, Volume 6
"I Can't Go for That / You Make My Dreams"	2011	80	178	—	74	—	—	—	—	Glee: The Music, The Complete Season Three
"Red Solo Cup"	2011	92	—	—	99	—	—	—	—	Glee: The Music, The Complete Season Three
"ABC"	2011	88	—	—	93	—	—	—	—	Glee: The Music, Volume 7
"We Are Young"	2011	12	56	32	11	49	53	—	21	Glee: The Music, The Graduation Album
"Never Can Say Goodbye"	2012	(Note: "Never Can Say Goodbye" did not enter the Billboard Hot 100, but did peak at number 7 on the Bubbling Under Hot 100 extension chart.)	—	—	—	—	—	—	—	Glee: The Music, The Complete Season Three
"Stereo Hearts"	2012	92	162	87	74	80	—	—	—	Glee: The Music, The Complete Season Three
"Edge of Glory"	2012	—	141	—	—	—	—	—	—	Glee: The Music, The Graduation Album
"We Are The Champions"	2012	—	198	—	—	—	—	—	—	Glee: The Music, The Graduation Album
"—" denotes a recording that did not chart or was not released in that territory.

== See also ==
- List of Glee characters
- List of Dianna Agron performances
