= Rock Slyde =

2009 film

- Directed by: Chris Dowling
- Written by: Chris Dowling
- Produced by: Chris Dowling; Milan Chakraborty; Jason Manns; Will Wallace; Josh Young
- Starring: Patrick Warburton; Andy Dick; Rena Sofer; Elaine Hendrix
- Cinematography: Alexandre Lehmann
- Edited by: Josh Young
- Production company: Attic Light Films
- Distributed by: Gravitas Ventures
- Release dates: 2009 (AFI Dallas); April 1, 2010 (VOD); May 1, 2010 (DVD)
- Running time: 89 minutes
- Country: United States
- Language: English

Rock Slyde is a 2009 American comedy film written and directed by Chris Dowling on his feature-length directorial debut. and produced by Will Wallace, Josh Young, and Milan Chakraborty. This independent production stars Patrick Warburton, Andy Dick, Rena Sofer, and Elaine Hendrix.

== Premise ==
Rock Slyde is a clumsy private detective, helped by his assistant Judy Bee. Slyde is trying to protect Sara Lee, a seductive baker, from a mysterious stalker, while contending with cult leader Bart and his followers, the Bartologists, who are trying to take over Slyde's office space.

== Cast ==
- Patrick Warburton as Rock Slyde
- Andy Dick as Bart
- Rena Sofer as Sara Lee
- Elaine Hendrix as Judy Bee
- Jamie Alexander as Martin
- Terry Chen as David

The film featured numerous actors in brief cameos as members of the Bart cult, as members of the Pirates, or in other roles, including:

- Jason Alexander as Stan, The Mailman
- Tom Bergeron as Randy Wonder
- Eric Roberts as Jake, The Deliveryman
- Lea Thompson as Master Bartologist
- Jerry Cantrell as Himself
- Brian Bosworth as The Friendly Pirate
- Kristin Holt as The Bartender
- Guillermo Rodriguez as Gary
- Billy Unger as Young Rock Slyde
