= Christmas in the Smokies =

- Directed by: Gary Wheeler
- Written by: Gary Wheeler
- Produced by: Gary Wheeler
- Starring: Sarah Lancaster; Barry Corbin; Alan Powell; Jill Wagner
- Production company: INSP Films
- Distributed by: Imagicomm Entertainment
- Release date: October 16, 2015
- Country: United States
- Language: English

Christmas in the Smokies is an American Christmas film, set in the Great Smoky Mountains. It follows a small, struggling family-run farm that needs a "miracle" to survive.

It aired originally on INSP in 2015. It has more recently aired on FOX and streaming platforms.

== Plot ==
Shelby Haygood is played by Sarah Lancaster and lives in Tennessee's Smoky Mountains with her parents. They have a simple farm life and its all Shelby has ever known. At 17, her ex-boyfriend Mason, played by Alan Powell, left her to pursue a career as a country singer. Fast forward to the present day, the family's future is threatened when a land grabbing developer has the Haygood farm in his crosshairs.

Christmas in the Smokies follows the journey of how people come together for their neighbours and community. The fight to save the farm ultimately helps Shelby and Mason reconnect, a couple who according to everyone in town were always meant for each other.

== Main cast ==
- Sarah Lancaster as Shelby Haygood
- Barry Corbin as Wade Haygood
- Alan Powell as Mason Wyatt
- Jill Wagner as Trish Greene
- Rebecca Koon as Annie Haygood
- Gregory Alan Williams as Bud Walker
- Danny Vinson as DJ Baley
- Brett Rice as Mr. Baxter
- Ava Monger as Rose
- Tim Perez-Ross as Glenn Robertson

== Reception ==
The Dove Foundation approved the film for all age groups.
