= Where Hope Grows =

2014 drama film by Chris Dowling

- Theatrical release poster
- Directed by: Chris Dowling
- Written by: Chris Dowling
- Produced by: Steve Bagheri; Simran A. Singh; Jose Pablo Cantillo; Milan Chakraborty
- Starring: Kristoffer Polaha; David DeSanctis; Billy Zabka; Brooke Burns; Kerr Smith; Michael Grant; Alan Powell; Danica McKellar; McKaley Miller
- Cinematography: Alexandre Lehmann
- Edited by: Soojin Chung
- Music by: Kyle Newmaster
- Production companies: Godspeed Pictures; Stealth Tiger Entertainment; Attic Light Films
- Distributed by: Roadside Attractions
- Release dates: April 6, 2014 (DIFF); May 15, 2015 (United States)
- Running time: 95 minutes
- Country: United States
- Language: English
- Box office: $1.2 million

Where Hope Grows is a 2014 American faith drama film written and directed by Chris Dowling and starring Kristoffer Polaha, Billy Zabka, Brooke Burns, Kerr Smith, Danica McKellar, McKaley Miller, and David DeSanctis in his film debut. It was released on May 15, 2015, by Roadside Attractions.

== Plot ==
After freezing at home plate, professional baseball player Calvin Campbell retires from the Detroit Tigers and retreats to his hometown in Louisville, Kentucky where he puts his life on hold for years to nurse his damaged pride.

Locked in self pity, Calvin now spends his days trying to drown the memory of his personal and professional failure in a bottle. But his alcoholism seeps into and soils every part of his life. As Katie, his sixteen-year-old daughter, battles for his attention, she turns to unhealthy relationships in a desperate attempt to fill a need left void by a disappointing and absent father.

During a routine visit to the supermarket, Calvin meets "Produce", the fruit and vegetable boy with Down syndrome. Joyful and eager to help, Produce uses his job to build personal connections with shoppers. After meeting Calvin, Produce confronts his dark depression with a burst of joy through his knowledge of produce and his love for people. When Calvin's life continues deteriorating, he finds himself drawn to the produce aisle for a listening ear, and soon a unique friendship forms between the two.

As Calvin and Produce spend time together, Produce's contagious attitude toward life leaves behind an impression that Calvin cannot fight off. But Produce is not without his own battles. With an unfulfilled dream of becoming employee of the month, Produce fights to stand for truth even when it results in being bullied. As Produce confronts his personal hardships, he shows Calvin a new way of dealing with disappointment: holding tightly to faith rather than a bottle.

Several days later, a heated conversation with Milton leaves Calvin reaching for the bottle. When Produce finds him incoherent, he takes Calvin's keys, preventing him from attending a job interview with the one Minor League Baseball team willing to give him a second chance. Drunk and jobless, Calvin sinks further into hopelessness and the pain of his selfish actions confronts him head on as his daughter finally admits to giving up on him.

The day after, Calvin apologizes to Produce for how he treated him. He attends Alcoholics Anonymous, and resolves to quit drinking that night. The movie cuts to Katie with Colt in his car, where they break up due to Colt pressuring Katie to have sex with him, and Colt leaves her stranded by the supermarket. Produce finds Katie, and gives her his jacket to keep her warm. When Colt returns and attempts to reconcile with Katie, Calvin arrives and sends him home. As a favor to Produce for his kindness, Calvin and Katie attend church with him.

Later, Katie and Produce encounter Colt at the laser tag arena. During the match, Colt corners Katie and attempts to sexually assault her, but Produce hits Colt over the head with a fire extinguisher, knocking him unconscious. Calvin, rushing to the scene, admonishes Produce for his actions, not knowing the full story, causing Produce to run away.

That night, Produce was hit by an intoxicated Milton, who was driving home after discovering his wife's infidelity. Calvin rushes to the hospital, where he finds out that both Produce and Milton are in critical condition. As the situation deteriorates for both, Produce gifts his Bible to Milton, and both go into emergency surgery. In a flash forward, it is revealed that Calvin became the manager for the minor league baseball team, Produce-(having survived both the accident and his surgery) became the bat boy for the team, and that Milton died from his injuries. The movie ends with Calvin dedicating his ceremonial first pitch to Milton.

== Cast ==
- Kristoffer Polaha as Calvin Campbell
- David DeSanctis as Produce
- McKaley Miller as Katie Campbell
- Michael Grant as Colt Beam
- William Zabka as Milton Malcolm
- Brooke Burns as Amy Boone
- Alan Powell as Franklin Weaver
- Danica McKellar as Susan Malcolm
- Kerr Smith as Mitch Minniear
- Clyde Jones as Dexter Douglas
- J. Teddy Garces as Dr. Jones
- Robert Johnson as Mr. Beam
- Ken Arnold as Steve Bookerson
- Chase Anderson as Jackson
- Rebecca Lines as Laura
- Phil Russell as Police Officer
- Drew Cash as Eric
- Sonya Thaper as Nurse Meera
- Michelle J. Fine as Nurse Kristen

== Release ==
The film was released on May 15, 2015, by Roadside Attractions.

== Reception ==
Where Hope Grows received mixed reviews from critics. On Rotten Tomatoes, the film has a rating of 50%, based on 14 reviews, with a rating of 4.9/10. On Metacritic, the film has a score of 41 out of 100, based on 8 critics, indicating "mixed or average reviews".
