= Alan Powell (actor) =

American actor (born 1985)

- Born: May 3, 1985 (age 41); Nashville, Tennessee, United States
- Occupation: Actor
- Years active: 2009–present

Alan Powell (born May 3, 1985) is an American singer and actor. He played Franklin Weaver in the 2014 film Where Hope Grows and Mike McQuigg in the third season of the ABC thriller Quantico.

== Biography ==
Alan Powell was born on May 3, 1985, in Nashville, Tennessee, US. In 2009, he made his acting debut in the 2009 film, Charlie & Boots. Following on from his first role, Powell won other roles on a variety of TV shows and films including Nashville, The Song, Caged No More and Christmas in the Smokies.

Powell started the Christian band Anthem Lights in 2007, but left in 2016 to pursue an acting career.

On November 21, 2017, it was announced that Powell joined as a series regular in the third season of the ABC thriller Quantico. He starred in the role of undercover agent, Mike McQuigg.

== Filmography ==
=== Film ===
Year	Title	Role	Notes
2009	Charlie & Boots	Rodeo Clown	
2013	Each Time Again	Ben	Short film
2014	Where Hope Grows	Franklin Weaver	
2014	The Song	Jed King	
2015	Christmas in the Smokies	Mason Wyatt	
2015	Happy Beltane!	Teller	Short film
2016	Caged No More	Will	
2016	Take It All the Way	Billy	Short film
2017	Worth Fighting For	Alex	
2018	Like Arrows	Charlie	
2018	Other Versions of You	Franklin	
2018	Beautifully Broken	G. David Anderson	
2019	Shooting Heroin	Adam	Theatrical Release
2019	Heavenquest: A Pilgrim's Progress	Aamon	
2019	Out of Ashes	Clayton	Completed; pending release
2020	The Reason	Kenneth	Completed; pending release

=== Television ===
Year	Title	Role	Notes
2012	Nashville	Guitar Tech	Episode: "I Can't Help It (If I'm Still in Love with You)"
2017	A Deadly Affair	Charlie	TV movie
2017	Redliners	Wynn Rhymer	TV movie
2018	The Arrangement	Aaron Woolth	2 episodes
2018	Quantico	Mike McQuigg	Series regular
