= Kristoffer Polaha =

American actor (born 1977)

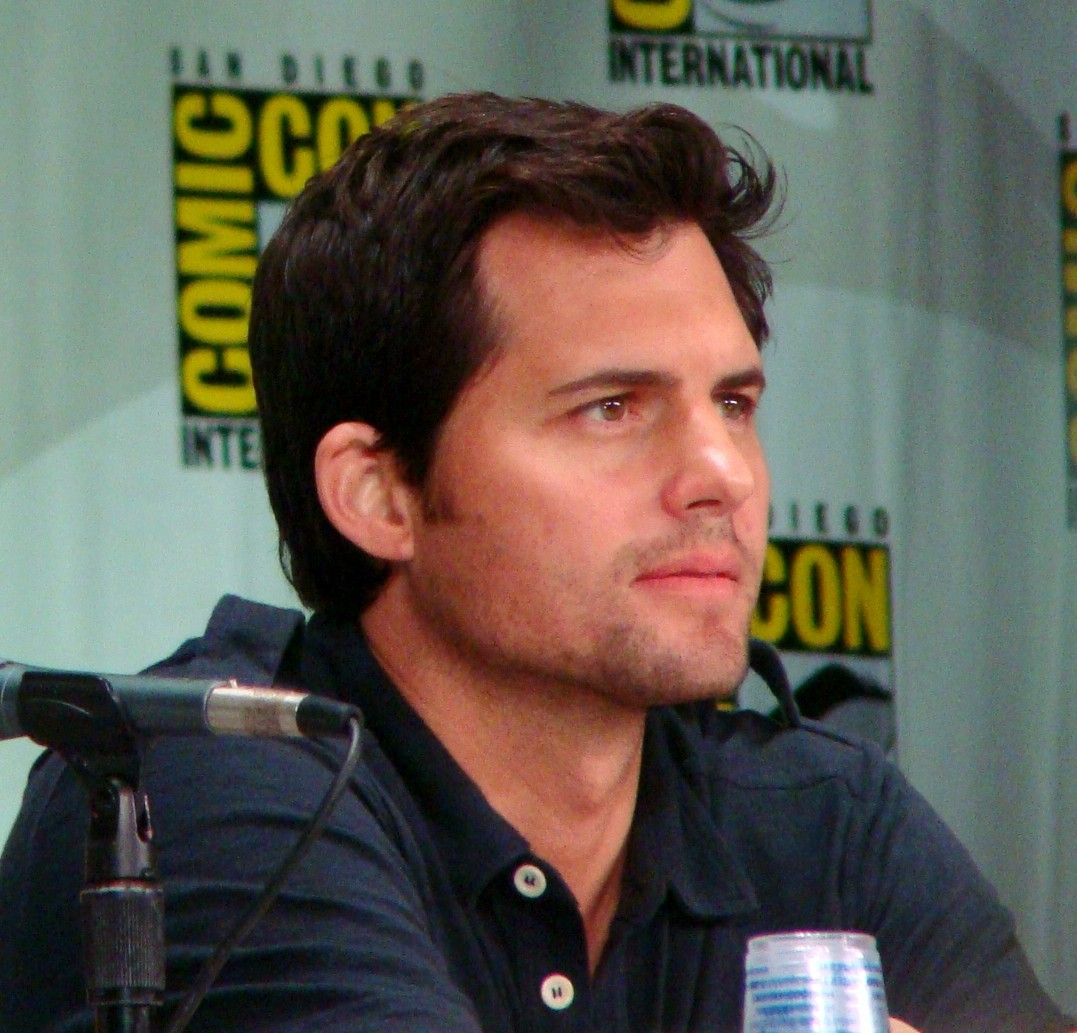
- Polaha in 2011
- Born: February 18, 1977 (age 49); Reno, Nevada, U.S.
- Education: New York University Tisch School of the Arts
- Occupations: Actor; author
- Years active: 2001–present
- Spouse: Julianne Morris (m. 2003)
- Children: 3
- Website: krispolaha.com

Kristoffer Polaha (born February 18, 1977) is an American actor. He is best known for his starring roles on television as Jason Matthews in North Shore, Nathaniel "Baze" Bazile in Life Unexpected, and Henry Butler in Ringer. He has also appeared in films Devil's Knot (2013), Wonder Woman 1984 (2020) and Jurassic World Dominion (2022).

Since 2016, Polaha has appeared in numerous Hallmark movies and a seven-part series of Hallmark Movies & Mysteries films titled Mystery 101, saying "as an actor, I am leaning into Hallmark because it's fun to sit with my seven-year-old and show him what I do for a living. These are family-friendly movies. I'm leaning in because my 91-year-old Nana finally thinks I've made it in Hollywood because I'm on Hallmark."

== Early life ==
Polaha was born in Reno, Nevada to Esther and Jerome Polaha. Polaha's family has Czech roots. His father was a Washoe District Court Judge. Polaha is the youngest of four brothers. He left Reno in the early 1990s to attend Robert Louis Stevenson boarding school in Pebble Beach, California. In 1999, he graduated from New York University Tisch School of the Arts, where he earned a Bachelor's degree in Arts. He moved to Los Angeles on July 4, 2001.

== Career ==
=== Film and television ===
Early in his career, Polaha appeared in theatre productions, including Ragtime Revue at Lincoln Center, The Long Days Journey Into Night at the Roundabout Theater, Bread & Butter at Provincetown Playhouse, and Uncle Vanya at the Stella Adler Conservatory. In early 2000s, Polaha began appearing in small roles in several American television series and films. His first on-screen appearance was a role as Gavin in the episode "Plus One" of comedy-drama series That's Life. He had roles in television series Angel, Roswell, Birds of Prey, Tru Calling, House, CSI: Miami, It's Always Sunny in Philadelphia, Bones and Close to Home. Polaha gained attention by portraying John F. Kennedy Jr. in the TBS film America's Prince: The John F. Kennedy Jr. Story (2003) opposite Portia de Rossi. In 2021, Polaha told Highbrow Magazine: "That was the biggest TV movie that TBS had ever released. I think 40 million people watched it that night, and I had a picture in Times Square of my face."

In 2004, he won the lead role of Jason Matthews on the prime-time soap opera North Shore. The series centered on the staff and guests of the fictional Grand Waimea Hotel and Resort. North Shore concluded in January 2005 after a 21-episode, single-season run. Polaha and his family lived in Hawaii for a year and their son was born there. In 2007, Polaha took the role of Carlton Hanson on drama television series Mad Men. In 2008, Polaha starred on the series Miss Guided and appeared in the biographical film Billy: The Early Years (2008). In 2009, he appeared in several guest starring television roles, including The Ex List, Dollhouse, Without a Trace and Better Off Ted. In 2010, he began portraying Nate Bazile, a bar owner who discovers he has a teenage daughter Lux Cassidy (Britt Robertson), on the teen drama series Life Unexpected. The series garnered mostly positive feedback during its two seasons, with many reviews favorably comparing the show to the critically acclaimed series Gilmore Girls and Everwood. In November 2010, Polaha signed a talent holding deal with CBS. Polaha founded a production company titled Podunk Productions in 2010. He played writer Henry Butler in The CW's thriller crime series Ringer until the series conclusion in 2012. Las Vegas Weekly gave Ringer a mixed review, saying it was "a little silly but also juicy and well-acted". In 2012, he landed a guest role on the second season of MTV's teen comedy series Awkward.

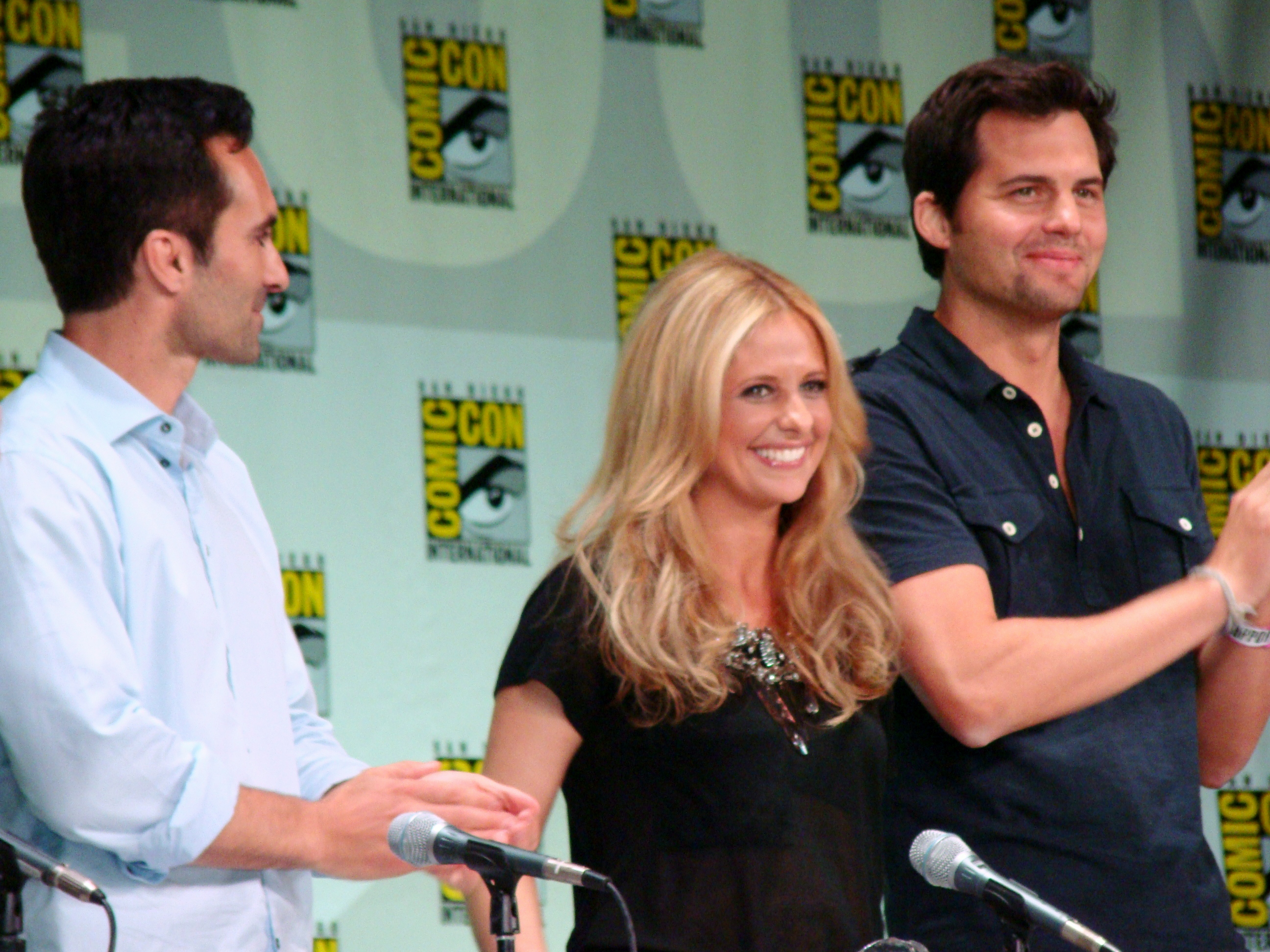
Nestor Carbonell, Sarah Michelle Gellar and Polaha attending Ringer panel at the 2011 San Diego Comic-Con

Polaha starred as John Galt in Atlas Shrugged: Part III, which was released on September 12, 2014. He appeared in the movies Devil's Knot (2013), Back in the Day (2014), Where Hope Grows (2015) and Aberrant (original name: Vineland) (2016). Where Hope Grows centers on the friendship between Calvin (portrayed by Polaha), a former professional baseball player and Produce (David DeSanctis), a young man with Down syndrome. The film grossed $1.2 million at the box office. He had a lead role as Jodie King in the short film Frontman (2016). He earned a Jury Award for Best Actor at Seattle Shorts Film Festival for his performance in Frontman. In 2017, Polaha played Jeffrey in five episodes of the comedy-drama television series Get Shorty.

Polaha has starred in several original Hallmark Channel films, including Dater's Handbook (2016) opposite Meghan Markle, Rocky Mountain Christmas (2017) opposite Lindy Booth and Pearl in Paradise (2018) alongside Jill Wagner. Especially Rocky Mountain Christmas was a success for the network. Polaha commented the film's popularity by saying: "Rocky Mountain Christmas won the night on cable. We had the highest ratings, not just the highest ratings ever in the history of Hallmark Movies & Mysteries, but we won the night across all the cable channels. It was a big deal for Hallmark, and it was a big deal for us as a cast because it really did set our movie apart. It was definitely one of those special moments." In 2018, he appeared in six episodes of the thriller television series Condor and starred in two films, Beneath the Leaves and Bachelor Lions.

He played detective Travis Burke in Hallmark's mystery television film series Mystery 101 (2019) opposite Jill Wagner. The film series included seven movies and the first one aired on January 27, 2019. Polaha portrayed Michael Truett in the Christian drama film Run the Race (2019), released on February 22, 2019 by Roadside Attractions. The film made $2.3 million in its opening weekend, finishing 10th at the box office. In November 2018, Polaha revealed that he will appear in Wonder Woman 1984 (2020), directed by Patty Jenkins; he played the 'host' to the resurrected spirit of Chris Pine's character. On July 26, 2019, The Hollywood Reporter announced that Polaha will appear in Hallmark Channel's Christmas-themed television film Double Holiday (2019) opposite Carly Pope. In 2020, he had a small role as Courthouse Reporter 2 in Hulu's drama miniseries Little Fires Everywhere starring Reese Witherspoon and Kerry Washington. Polaha starred in Hallmark's original Christmas film A Dickens of a Holiday! (2021) as Jake Dorsey, famous action star who grew up in Dickens, Ohio.

Polaha appeared as CIA officer Wyatt Huntley in the science fiction film Jurassic World Dominion (2022), which was a financial success, grossing $1 billion worldwide and becoming the second highest-grossing film of 2022. On November 6, 2023, he appeared on the cover of TV Guide magazine alongside actress Bethany Joy Lenz. He had a lead role as Kevin Garner in the sci-fi thriller film The Shift (2023), produced by Ken Carpenter. The film follows Kevin, who finds himself in a dystopian world confronted by a stranger known as "The Benefactor" who presents him with challenges as Kevin fights to shift realities and return to the woman he loves. Filmed in Birmingham, Alabama, the film was released on December 1, 2023. Also in 2023, he had a lead role in the Hallmark Christmas movie A Biltmore Christmas opposite Bethany Joy Lenz, playing Jack Huston, an actor from the 1940s, who encounters present time Lucy Hardgrove, played by Lenz, who gets transported to the 1940s through a magical hourglass at the Biltmore Estate in Asheville, NC.

Polaha directed, co-produced, and starred in the 2025 horror comedy film Mimics, in which he plays a struggling impressionist who makes a pact with a living dummy for stardom.

=== Books ===
In June 2020, Variety reported that Polaha had signed a book deal with Rosewind Books to co-author a series of romance novels with Anna Gomez. The first in the From Kona with Love book series, titled Moments Like This, is set in Hawaii and centers on a young woman looking to find herself after losing her career and relationship. It was published on February 2, 2021. The second book, Where the Sun Rises, was published on October 11, 2022, by Vesuvian Media's Rosewind Books.

Polaha plans to produce the books for film and television through his production company Podunk Productions.

== Personal life ==
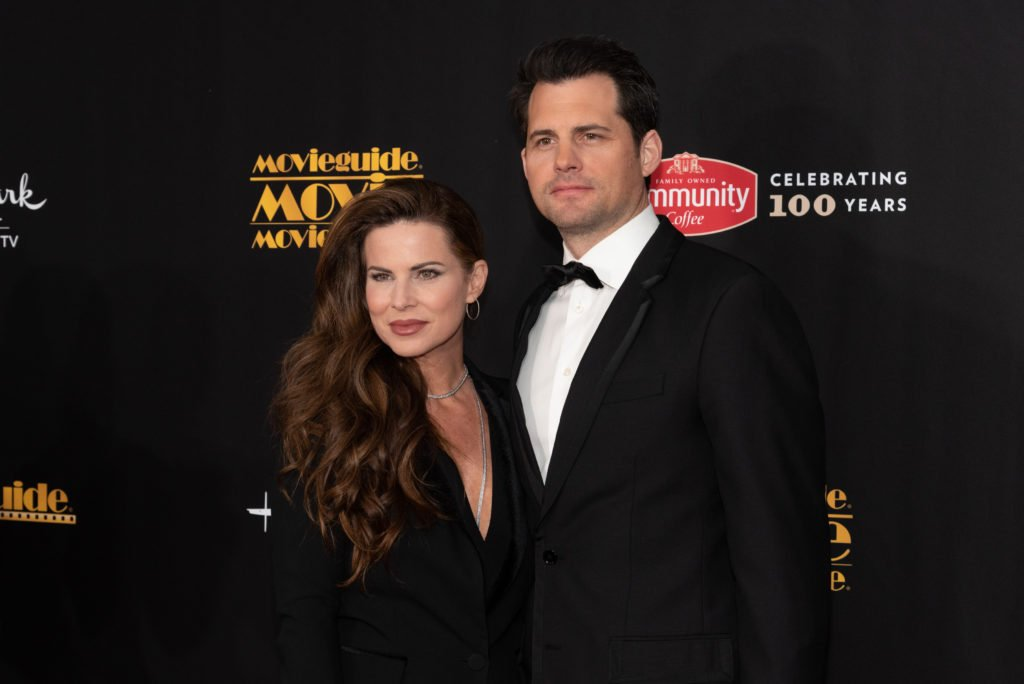
Polaha and his wife Julianne Morris

Polaha is a practicing Christian and spoke about how he fell away from his faith, but a death-defying experience made him believe again. In 2019, when asked in an interview what he would like to be remembered for, Polaha replied: "So I'm an actor, and if an audience is going to remember me, I'd kind of like to be in the same boat as Jimmy Stewart, Tom Hanks...these guys who are really great at their craft but who've also made people feel really good on a human level. Even Audrey Hepburn was somebody who – wouldn't it be great to have these amazing successes as an actor so that aspect of your life was a given, but then the stories also include how kind they are. Just what good people they were. And I would love that to be my legacy."

Polaha married actress Julianne Morris on June 7, 2003, at the Windermere Chapel in Windermere, Florida. The couple has three sons born in 2004, 2006, and 2011.

== Filmography ==
=== Film ===
Year	Title	Role	Notes
2008	Billy: The Early Years	Young Charles Templeton	
2013	Devil's Knot	Val Price	
2014	Atlas Shrugged Part III: Who Is John Galt?	John Galt	
2014	Back in the Day	Len Brenneman	
2015	Where Hope Grows	Calvin Campbell	
2016	I Am JFK Jr.	Himself	Host; Documentary film
2016	Aberrant (Vineland)	Alexander	
2016	Frontman	Jodie King	Short film; also as executive producer
2018	Bachelor Lions	James Harmon	
2019	Beneath the Leaves	Detective Brian Larson	
2019	Run the Race	Michael Truett	
2019	A Work of Art	Owen	Short film; also producer, writer and director
2020	Wonder Woman 1984	Handsome Man	
2022	Jurassic World Dominion	Wyatt Huntley	
2023	The Shift	Kevin Garner	
2023	The Marked	Carter	Short film; also producer
2023	The Chain that Binds	Rae Terraneo	Short film
2024	Life and Soul	Kanner Parsons	Short film
2024	Right Here, Right Now	Mr. Lowe	
2024	The Christmas Letter	Barry the Bartender	
2025	Mimics	Sam Reinhold	Also director and co-producer

=== Television ===
Year	Title	Role	Notes
2001	The Third Degree	Jason	Television movie
2001–2002	That's Life	Gavin	Episodes: "Plus One", "Gutterball"
2001	Angel	Dylan Blim	Episode: "Billy"
2002	Roswell	Eric Hughs	Episode: "I Married An Alien"
2002	Birds of Prey	Darkstrike	Episode: "Split"
2003	America's Prince: The John F. Kennedy Jr. Story	John F. Kennedy Jr.	Television movie
2003	Tru Calling	Mark Evans	3 episodes
2003	Splitsville	Wes Brown	Television movie
2004	North Shore	Jason Matthews	Main role
2005	House	Jeff Forster	Episode: "Spin"
2005	Hot Properties	Ron	Episode: "It's a Wonderful Christmas Carol on 34th Street"
2006	It's Always Sunny in Philadelphia	Male Employee	Episode: "Charlie Gets Crippled"
2006	CSI: Miami	Jeremy Fordham	Episode: "Curse of the Coffin"
2006	Bones	Will Hastings	Episode: "The Headless Witch in the Woods"
2007	Close to Home	Alistair Joyce	Episode: "Barren"
2007–2009	Mad Men	Carlton Hansen	4 episodes
2008	Miss Guided	Tim O'Malley	Main role
2008–2009	Valentine	Danny Valentine	Main role
2009	The Ex List	Philip Emmerson	Episode: "Metro Guy and the Non Ex"
2009	Without a Trace	Justin Morgan	Episode: "Daylight"
2009	Better Off Ted	Don	Episode: "Racial Sensitivity"
2009	Dollhouse	Nate Jordan	Episode: "Instinct"
2010	Romantically Challenged	Jesse	Episode: "Perry and Rebecca's High School Reunion"
2010–2011	Life Unexpected	Nathaniel "Baze" Bazile	Main role
2011–2012	Ringer	Henry Butler	Main role
2012	Made in Jersey	Nolan	Main role
2012	Awkward.	Ben	Episodes: "Another One Bites the Dust", "Time After Time"
2013	CSI: Crime Scene Investigation	Darryl Walsh	Episode: "Girls Gone Wild"
2014	Dating in LA and Other Urban Myths	Alex	Web series; 3 episodes
2015	Backstrom	Sgt. Peter Niedermayer	Main role
2015	Stalker	Nathan Grant	Episodes: "Love Hurts", "Love Kills"
2015	Hawaii Five-0	Hank Weber	Episode: "Piko Pau 'Iole"
2015–2016	Castle	Caleb Brown	4 episodes
2016	Hearts of Christmas	Matt Crawford	Television movie (Hallmark Movies & Mysteries)
2016	Rizzoli & Isles	Edward Dunn	Episode: "For Richer or Poorer"
2016	Dater's Handbook	Robert	Television movie (Hallmark)
2016	Lethal Weapon	Bennet Hirsch/Gino Corelli	Episode: "Surf N Turf"
2017	Get Shorty	Jeffrey	Recurring role, 5 episodes
2017	Designated Survivor	David Sheridan	Episode: "Line of Fire"
2017	Rocky Mountain Christmas	Graham Mitchell	Television movie (Hallmark Movies & Mysteries)
2018	Pearl in Paradise	Colin Page	Television movie (Hallmark)
2018	A Small Town Christmas	Emmett Turner	Television movie (Hallmark Movies & Mysteries)
2018–2020	Condor	Sam Barber	Recurring role, 9 episodes
2018	Ballers	Jerry White	Episodes: "The Kids Are Aight", "The Devil You Know"
2019	Mystery 101	Travis Burke	Television movie (Hallmark Movies & Mysteries)
2019	Mystery 101: Playing Dead	Travis Burke	Television movie (Hallmark Movies & Mysteries)
2019	Mystery 101: Words Can Kill	Travis Burke	Television movie (Hallmark Movies & Mysteries)
2019	Mystery 101: Dead Talk	Travis Burke	Television movie (Hallmark Movies & Mysteries)
2019	Double Holiday	Chris Coulter	Television movie (Hallmark)
2020	Little Fires Everywhere	Courthouse Reporter 2	Uncredited; Episodes: "Picture Perfect", "Find a Way"
2020	Mystery 101: An Education in Murder	Travis Burke	Television movie (Hallmark Movies & Mysteries)
2021	The Good Doctor	Anton Denys	Episode: "Parenting"
2021	Mystery 101: Killer Timing	Travis Burke	Television movie (Hallmark Movies & Mysteries)
2021	Mystery 101: Deadly History	Travis Burke	Television movie (Hallmark Movies & Mysteries)
2021	A Dickens Of A Holiday!	Jake Dorsey	Television movie (Hallmark)
2022	Buried in Barstow	Elliot	Television movie (Lifetime)
2022	We Wish You a Married Christmas	Robby	Television movie (Hallmark Channel)
2022	Haul out the Holly	Kevin	
2023	A Winning Team	Ian	Television movie (Hallmark Channel)
2023	Tuttle Twins	President Rabies	Voice; Episode: "Kidnappers & Capitalism"
2023	Harlan Coben's Shelter	Brad Bolitar	Recurring role; 4 episodes
2023	A Biltmore Christmas	Jack Huston	Television movie (Hallmark Channel)
2024	Landman	Clay Chandler	Episode: "Hell Has a Front Yard"
2024	The Christmas Quest	Chase Baxter	Television movie
2026	Missing the Boat	Parker	Television movie

== Awards and nominations ==
Year	Group	Award	Work	Result
2016	Seattle Shorts Film Festival	Jury Award for Best Actor	Frontman	Won
2021	Cannes Film Festival	Emerging Filmmaker Showcase	A Work of Art	Nominated
2022	Chandler International Film Festival	Best Drama Short Film	A Work of Art	Won
2022	Just Jared Awards	Favorite Hallmark Channel Star of 2022	Himself	Nominated
2023	Las Vegas Black Film Festival	Festival Prize: Best Cast Ensemble (shared with: Emily Swallow, Reggie Austin and Wesley Moss)	The Marked	Nominated
2023	Independent Shorts Awards	March Award: Best Ensemble Cast (shared with: Emily Swallow, Reggie Austin and Wesley Moss)	The Marked	Nominated
2023	IndieX Film Festival	April Award: Best Ensemble Cast (shared with: Emily Swallow, Reggie Austin and Wesley Moss)	The Marked	Nominated
2024	International Christian Film & Music Festival	Best Lead Actor	The Shift	Nominated

== Bibliography ==
- Polaha, Kristoffer & Gomez, Anna (2021). Moments Like This. Rosewind Books.
- Polaha, Kristoffer & Gomez, Anna (2022). Where the Sun Rises. Rosewind Books.
