= Billy: The Early Years =

- Directed by: Robby Benson
- Written by: William Paul McKay; Jana Lyn Rutledge
- Produced by: Lawrence Mortorff; Martin Shiel; William Paul McKay
- Starring: Armie Hammer; Stefanie Butler; Kristoffer Polaha; Cliff Bemis
- Cinematography: David Rudd
- Edited by: Ryan Folsey
- Music by: Anastasia Brown (music supervisor); Scott Brasher (composer: score)
- Distributed by: Rocky Mountain Pictures
- Release date: October 10, 2008
- Running time: 98 minutes
- Country: United States
- Language: English
- Budget: $3.6 million
- Box office: $347,328

Billy: The Early Years is a 2008 American biographical film directed by Robby Benson. The film tells the story of the early life of evangelist Billy Graham, played by Armie Hammer. After almost a year and a half of delays, the film was released on DVD on March 16, 2010.

World Wide Pictures, the film distribution and production company that was created by the Billy Graham Evangelistic Association, did not work on the film's production.

== Plot ==
A reporter (Jennifer O'Neill) is interviewing Charles Templeton on his deathbed. Told through the eyes of Templeton, the film shows Billy Graham’s life as a teenager during the Great Depression living at the family dairy farm in North Carolina. During this time, Graham becomes a Christian at a tent revival meeting. Later, Graham goes to Bob Jones College, then transfers to Florida Bible Institute after being identified as a failure by Bob Jones, Sr. Following his time at Florida Bible Institute, Graham goes to Wheaton College where he falls in love with classmate Ruth Bell, whom he ultimately marries. In the 1940s, Templeton and Graham become close until Templeton's scientific skepticism causes him to lose his faith and his friendship with Graham. The film finishes with Graham inviting his listeners to accept Christ as their personal savior in his Los Angeles crusade of 1949.

== Cast ==
- Armie Hammer as Billy Graham
- Stefanie Butler as Ruth Bell Graham
- Kristoffer Polaha as young Charles Templeton
- Martin Landau as older Charles Templeton
- Lindsay Wagner as Morrow Graham
- Josh Turner as George Beverly Shea
- Jennifer O'Neill as Reporter

== Production ==
=== Casting ===
Screenwriter-producer William Paul McKay and producer Lawrence Mortorff originally wanted John Hagee to portray Mordecai Ham but director Robby Benson, concerned that Hagee's controversial public persona would cause a distraction, cast Cliff Bemis instead.

To find the lead actor, producers held talent searches in Los Angeles, New York and San Francisco.

=== Filming ===
The film was shot in Nashville and Watertown, Tennessee with a production budget of $3.6 million.

== Release ==
=== Marketing ===
Advance screenings were held throughout the Bible Belt in Georgia, Alabama, North Carolina, Missouri, Tennessee, Florida, Kentucky, Virginia and Arkansas. Thomas Nelson published a novelization, Billy: The Untold Story of a Young Billy Graham and the Test of Faith that Almost Changed Everything, written by McKay and Ken Abraham.

=== Reception ===
Billy: The Early Years opened on October 10, 2008, less than a month before Graham's 90th birthday, grossing $192,042 in 282 theaters during its opening weekend. The film would eventually gross a total of $347,328. In response to the film's box office reception, Mortorff said that Fireproof, an evangelical film which had been released around the same time, might have unintentionally hurt the film. Mortorff also said that his team was planning a "second wave" of theatrical releases and looking forward to recovering its losses through DVD sales and TV deals.

Although Billy Graham's son, Franklin Graham, criticized the film, Gigi Graham, eldest daughter of Billy Graham, supported the film, saying that the film has the "Gospel of Jesus in there" and is "positive toward my parents and their ministry." In a review of the film, critic Roger Moore commented that a "bland leading man in a movie without much of a biographical spark to it makes for a dull sermon indeed."

A CBN review said the film had "a simple and unassuming charm about it, much like the man it honors."

== Award nominations ==
At the Epiphany Awards, Hammer's performance received a Grace Award nomination for most inspiring performance in movies & TV.

== Soundtrack ==
The soundtrack was released October 7, 2008, and charted at No. 70 on the U.S. Top Country Albums chart. The album has produced two chart singles; "Low" by Sara Evans and "Over the Next Hill" by Brooks & Dunn. Additionally, the song "Look at Me" was covered by Carrie Underwood for her third studio album, Play On, which was released on November 3, 2009.

=== Singles ===
"Low" (by Sara Evans) was chosen as the leading song for the soundtrack, and was released on September 29, 2008. In October it debuted at No. 59 on the Hot Country Songs chart, but fell off the next week. The song then re-entered on the chart dated for January 24, 2009. A music video was made for the single, which features Sara Evans performing inside of a church and next to a log house with scenes from the movie intertwined with them.

In late 2009, "Over the Next Hill" by Brooks & Dunn debuted at No. 60 on the Hot Country Songs chart for the week of November 28, 2009. The song also features vocals from Mac Powell of the Christian rock band Third Day

=== Track listing ===
1. "Over the Next Hill" by Brooks & Dunn with Mac Powell (of Third Day) - 3:08
2. "Low" by Sara Evans - 3:12
3. "Look at Me" by Alan Jackson - 3:15
4. "Shelter Me" by China Edelman - 2:45
5. "Ruth's Prayer" by Patty Griffin - 3:48
6. "Heavenly Day" by Brandon Heath - 3:34
7. "The Great Wild Beyond" by Gregory Page - 3:50
8. "Amazing Love" by Michael W. Smith and Melinda Doolittle - 3:21
9. "In Dreams" by Roy Orbison - 2:49
10. "What a Friend We Have in Jesus" by Brad Paisley - 2:27
11. "Almost Persuaded" by Josh Turner - 2:13
12. "Just As I Am" by Sierra Hull and All-Star Choir - 2:19

=== Charts ===
==== Album ====
Chart (2008)	Peak Position
U.S. Billboard Top Country Albums	70

==== Singles ====
Year	Single	Peak positions
Year	Single	US Country
2008	"Low" (by Sara Evans)	59
2009	"Over the Next Hill" (by Brooks & Dunn and Mac Powell)	55

=== Awards ===
In 2009, the album was nominated for a Dove Award for Special Event Album of the Year at the 40th GMA Dove Awards.
