= The Hunters (2011 film) =

- Theatrical Poster
- Directed by: Chris Briant
- Written by: Michael Lehman
- Produced by: Antoine Huet; Thomas Malmonte; Donato Rotunno; Joseph Rouschop
- Starring: Steven Waddington; Tony Becker; Dianna Agron; Terence Knox; Jay Brown; Philip Correia; Chris Briant
- Cinematography: John B. Aronson
- Edited by: Nafi Dicko
- Music by: Mark Snow
- Production companies: Humal Production; Seberiane Picture
- Distributed by: Raven Banner Entertainment
- Release dates: 30 January 2011 (Gerardmer International Fantasy Film Festival); 27 December 2011 (U.S.); 29 June 2012 (France DVD)
- Running time: 111 minutes
- Countries: France; Luxembourg; Belgium
- Language: English
- Budget: $10 million

The Hunters is a 2011 French-Luxembourgish-Belgian crime horror thriller film directed by Chris Briant. The film was produced by Antoine Huet, Thomas Malmonte, Donato Rotunno, and Joseph Rouschop. It stars Dianna Agron, Steven Waddington and Tony Becker. It was released in limited theaters on December 27, 2011.

== Plot ==
On the outskirts of town is a large abandoned fort turned wooded park. Detective Le Saint is an ex-soldier assigned to protect a police informant who he arranges to meet at an abandoned fort in the woods. Alice is a college student who sneaks into the fort with a friend to go exploring. Unfortunately, the fort is also used by a group of men as a base for hunting humans: vagrants, tourists, and anyone else who happens to stray too far into the woods or stay after the park closes. Now Le Saint and Alice are caught up in the hunt against men who see humans as their next prey.

== Production ==
The film, while hosting an array of American actors, was filmed in Luxembourg and France.

== Cast ==
- Dianna Agron as Alice
- Chris Briant as Le Saint
- Steven Waddington as Ronny
- Tony Becker as Oliver Sheribow
- Terence Knox as Bernard
- Jay Brown as Stephen
- Xavier Delambre as William Icham
- Philip Correia as David
- Laurent Barbier as François
- Philippe Beauvais as Cyclist
- Sascha Migge as Security Agent
- Daniel Plier as Dan Darrish
- Thomas Sanne as Sam
- Gintare Parulyte as Bernard's Secretary
- Alex Adam as Peter
- Mireille De Kerleau as Ann
- Corinne Pilutti as Beth
- Loreta Fishta as Le Saint's Ex
- Sophie Pop as Sondra

== Release ==
The film had limited theatrical release on December 27, 2011. It was released on DVD February 19, 2012.
