= Acidman (film) =

2022 film by Alex Lehmann

- Theatrical release poster
- Directed by: Alex Lehmann
- Written by: Alex Lehmann; Chris Dowling
- Produced by: Liz Cardenas; Alex Lehmann; Dianna Agron; Christian Agypt; Sergey Selyanov
- Starring: Thomas Haden Church; Dianna Agron
- Cinematography: John Matysiak
- Edited by: Courtney Ware
- Music by: Christopher French
- Production company: Manageable Monkey
- Distributed by: Brainstorm Media
- Release dates: June 10, 2022 (Tribeca); March 31, 2023 (United States)
- Running time: 87 minutes
- Country: United States
- Language: English

Acidman is a 2022 American science fiction drama film directed by Alex Lehmann and written by Lehmann and Chris Dowling. It stars Thomas Haden Church and Dianna Agron.

Haden Church plays Lloyd, a reclusive man who is tracked down by his daughter Maggie, played by Agron, after a decade apart to tell him some important news. His UFO obsession makes communication hard.

== Premise ==
Lloyd is a reclusive man who lives in a home in the middle of nowhere searching for UFOs. He is estranged from his daughter Maggie and has been given the nickname "Acidman" by the locals. One day his daughter Maggie arrives, having painstakingly tracked him down in order to visit with him and pass along some important news. The two find it difficult to talk to one another, at times relying on outside elements such as childhood toys or Lloyd's dog Migo to fuel the conversation along. It's when Maggie travels with Lloyd to search for UFOs that night that she realizes how much his mental health has deteriorated.

== Cast ==
- Dianna Agron as Maggie
- Thomas Haden Church as Lloyd
- Sameerah Luqmaan-Harris

== Release ==
Acidman premiered at the 2022 Tribeca Film Festival in the Spotlight section on June 10, 2022. In February 2023, Brainstorm Media acquired distribution rights and scheduled the film to be released on March 31, 2023.

== Reception ==
On the review aggregator website Rotten Tomatoes, 76% of 33 critics' reviews are positive, with an average rating of 6.4/10. IndieWire and Shockya both reviewed the film, the former praising Haden Church's performance.
