= Chris Dowling (director) =

American screenwriter and film director

- Born: Flowood, Mississippi, U.S.
- Education: University of Texas at Austin
- Occupations: Film director, screenwriter, film producer

Chris Dowling is an American screenwriter, film director, and producer. He is known for writing and directing Where Hope Grows and Roll With It, and for co-writing and directing Run the Race. His screenwriting credits include Priceless, Blue Miracle, and Acidman. He directed the 2026 comedy film Bad Counselors.

== Early life ==
Dowling was born in Flowood, Mississippi, and grew up in Dallas, Texas. He graduated from the University of Texas at Austin with a degree in radio, television and film, and moved to Los Angeles in 2009.

== Career ==
Dowling wrote and directed his feature directorial debut, Rock Slyde, a comedy starring Patrick Warburton. He later wrote and directed Where Hope Grows, and co-wrote and directed Run the Race.

As a screenwriter, Dowling worked on films including The Remaining, Priceless, The World We Make, Blue Miracle, and Acidman. He also wrote and directed Roll With It, a comedy starring Chonda Pierce, which was released in theaters by Fathom Events.

Dowling produced the documentary Asperger's Are Us, which was acquired by Netflix, and produced the HBO documentary series On Tour with Asperger's Are Us.

In 2026, Dowling directed and produced Bad Counselors, a comedy released by Fathom Entertainment.

== Awards and recognition ==
Where Hope Grows won the Audience Award for Best Narrative Feature at the Heartland International Film Festival.

Roll With It won the Audience Award for Best Narrative Feature at the Dallas International Film Festival.

Acidman, which Dowling co-wrote, won the Grand Jury Prize at the Dallas International Film Festival.

Blue Miracle won the Movieguide Epiphany Prize for Most Inspiring Movie of 2021.

== Filmography ==
=== Film ===
Year	Title	Credit(s)	Notes	Ref.
2004	The Plight of Clownana	Writer, director, producer	Short film	
2009	Rock Slyde	Writer, director		
2014	The Remaining	Screenwriter		
2014	Where Hope Grows	Writer, director		
2016	Priceless	Screenwriter		
2016	Asperger's Are Us	Producer	Documentary film	
2019	Run the Race	Co-writer, director		
2019	The World We Make	Screenwriter		
2021	The Man From Nowhere	Writer, producer		
2021	Blue Miracle	Screenwriter		
2022	Acidman	Screenwriter		
2023	Roll With It	Writer, director		
2024	A Bluegrass Christmas	Screenwriter		
2026	Bad Counselors	Director, producer		

=== Television ===
Year	Title	Credit(s)	Notes	Ref.
2011	Repo Games	Creator	Reality television series	
2019	On Tour with Asperger's Are Us	Producer	Documentary series	
2024	Blue Ridge: The Series	Writer, director		
