= Fred Yancey =

American football coach

Fred Yancey (born 1945) was the head football coach at Briarwood Christian School in Birmingham, Alabama.

Yancey coached at Briarwood from 1991 until 2018 and is second all time in wins among Alabama high school football coaches. Briarwood has won three state titles under Yancey in 1998, 1999, and 2003, as well as advancing to the state championship game in 2007, 2010, and 2017. His record after the 2009 season was 211-77-1. In 2017, he notched his 300th career win as a head coach.

He was also named to coach the Alabama team in the Alabama-Mississippi All-Star Game in 2010, leading the team to a 24-17 double overtime victory.

Yancey coached NFL players Tim Castille and Simeon Castille at Briarwood as well as former Auburn quarterback and NFL Offensive Coach Barrett Trotter. He has also helped train coaches, including Joe Craddock, now a quarterbacks coach at the University of Florida.

On November 26, 2018, Yancey announced his retirement after 29 seasons.
