= A Bend in the River (film) =

2021 film by Colin Broderick

- Directed by: Colin Broderick
- Produced by: Julie Ryan
- Starring: John Connors; John Duddy; Kathy Kiera Clarke
- Release date: 2021

A Bend in the River is a 2021 film directed by Colin Broderick, produced by Julie Ryan, and starring John Connors, John Duddy, and Kathy Kiera Clarke.

Filming took place in County Tyrone, Northern Ireland, and was completed in April 2018.

The film was scheduled to premiere at the 2020 Belfast Film Festival, but the festival was cancelled due to the COVID-19 pandemic. It was screened at the 2021 Craic Film Festival.
