= Julie Ryan =

Julie Ryan may refer to:

- Julie Ryan (Australian producer), Australian film producer
- Julie Ryan (Irish producer), Irish producer of film and television
- Julie Ryan, New Zealand poet, winner of the 2014 Kathleen Grattan Prize for a Sequence of Poems

== See also ==
- Julie Rayne (1930‒2025?), British singer and entertainer
