= Briarwood Christian School =

Location
- 6255 Cahaba Valley Rd; Birmingham, Alabama 35242; United States; 33°23′29″N 86°41′25″W

Information
- Denomination: Christian (Presbyterian (PCA))
- Established: 1964 (62 years ago)
- Superintendent: Mr. Gus Martin
- CEEB code: 010332
- Principal: Dr. Joshua Farrell and Mrs. Tasha Holliday
- Grades: K-12
- Enrollment: 1740 (2025)
- Colors: Blue & Gold
- Mascot: Lions
- Accreditation: COGNIA, Association of Christian Schools International (ACSI), Council for Educational Standards and Accountability (CESA)
- Website: www.briarwoodchristianschool.org

Briarwood Christian School is a private school in Birmingham, Alabama. It was founded by Briarwood Presbyterian Church in 1964. In 1970, when integration of the public schools was mandated by the federal government, the IRS began revoking the tax exempt status of segregation academies. During this time the school added a non-discrimination policy, although no black students were admitted.

== Academics ==
Briarwood Christian School employs 205 faculty members and offers a college preparatory curriculum. The student-to-teacher ratio is 16:1. Briarwood offers 39 advanced placement classes, as well as dual enrollment classes at levels beyond AP in Math, Science, History, and English.

== Accreditation ==
Briarwood Christian School is an ACSIand Council for Educational Standards and Accountability (CESA) member and COGNIA accredited K-12 school with over 1820 students. It operates in four sections: Early Childhood, Elementary, Junior High, and High School.

== Enrollment ==
Briarwood currently enrolls K4-12th grade students across both campuses with 593 High School Students, 273 Middle School Students, 471 Elementary Students, and 385 Early Childhood students. The school does not report data to the National Center for Education Statistics.

== Rankings ==
Briarwood was recognized as the top three private high school in the state of Alabama In Niche's 2021 High School Rankings.

== Athletics ==
Briarwood High School has won 36 AHSAA State Athletic Championships since 1990.

=== Athletic State Championships ===
Men's Basketball won the State Championship title in 1977 and 1978. Women's Basketball won the State Championship title in 1981. Men's Cross Country won the State Championship title in 1998, 1999, and 2000. Women's Cross Country won the State Championship title in 1999. Football won the State Championship title in 1977, 1978, 1982, 1998, 1999, and 2003. Men's Golf won the State Championship title in 2006 and 2007. Men's Soccer won the State Championship title in 2001, 2004, 2007, 2013, 2019 and 2026. Women's Soccer won the State Championship title in 1997, 1998, 1999, 2000, 2002, 2006, 2007, 2010, and 2017. Women's Outdoor Track won the State Championship title in 1997, 1998, and 1999. Women's Indoor Track won the State Championship title in 1990, 1998, 1999, and 2000. Women's Tennis won the State Championship title in 2001, 2013, and 2016. Men's Tennis won the State Championship title in 2017, 2018, 2019 and 2025. Women's Volleyball won the State Championship title in 1991, 1993, 1994, 1996, 1997, 1998, and 1999.

=== Varsity Sports ===
Briarwood offers the following Varsity and Club Sports: Baseball, Softball, Basketball, Soccer, Golf, Tennis, Cross Country, Track, Volleyball, Bass Fishing, Swimming, Lacrosse.

=== Football ===
The Briarwood football team has won four state titles. Former head coach Fred Yancey is second on the list of all-time winningest Alabama high school head coaches. His staff includes some former Alabama players. Former Alabama teammates under Bear Bryant, Jeremiah Castille (Super Bowl competitor) and Joey Jones (Former University of South Alabama head coach) as well as former Alabama defensive back Sam Shade have also served as assistant coaches at the school. Former Briarwood players include NFL players Tim and Simeon Castille, as well as Barrett Trotter, former Auburn starting quarterback and former St. Louis Rams football operations assistant. Former Briarwood quarterback and offensive coordinator Joe Craddock is currently on the football coaching staff at University of Arkansas football.. Most recently, Quarterback Christopher Vizzina signed with Clemson University. Vizzina started for four years and is one of the best athletes to ever go through Briarwood. He led the Lions to many wins over four years and finished as the school's only five-star prospect ever. His leadership off the field was even more impressive as the school student body saw him as a very influential leader.

== Discipline ==
Until 2018, the school's website included a page called "school philosophy" which said that it "believes the Bible teaches the use of corporal punishment in the discipline of young people. Staff are instructed to use the paddle whenever necessary", however, this is a rare happening. That page has now gone, but the application form for international high-school students still requires parents to agree that "Briarwood Christian School has full discretion in the discipline of students while at the School, including paddling".

In 2017, the school's sponsor, the Briarwood Presbyterian Church, petitioned the state of Alabama to charter its own police force.

“After the shooting at Sandy Hook and in the wake of similar assaults at churches and schools, Briarwood recognized the need to provide qualified first responders to coordinate with local law enforcement." Matt Moore, church administrator

That year, the bill died in the legislature, but in 2019, HB 309 passed and was signed into law by Governor Kay Ivey.

== Narcotics scandal ==
In 2015, the Shelby County Sheriff's Office raided the high school campus after receiving multiple tips about student involvement in a local drug ring. Several students were expelled and one was arrested. The school was criticized in the press for its lack of transparency in responding to the events. The school has since moved on from this era with a greater level of transparency and accountability for students including random drug tests and proactive random K-9 unit visits beginning in 2023.

== Notable alumni ==
- Simeon Castille — NFL cornerback
- Christopher Vizzina, quarterback for Clemson University
- Joe Craddock — American football coach
- Michael Hiers — college football quarterback for the Samford Bulldogs
- Kalan Reed — NFL cornerback
- Cat Reddick Whitehill — Olympic gold medalist, played soccer at the school before joining the United States women's national soccer team
- Caleb Castille — actor
- Daniel Robert — MLB pitcher
