= Richard Jewell (disambiguation) =

Richard Jewell may refer to:

- Richard Jewell (1962–2007), the man wrongly accused of the 1996 Olympic Park bombing in Atlanta
- Richard G. Jewell, 8th president of Grove City College
- Richard Roach Jewell (1810–1891), Australian architect
- Richard Jewell (film), a 2019 biographical film about the 1996 Olympic bombing
