= Cheryl McKay =

American author and screenwriter

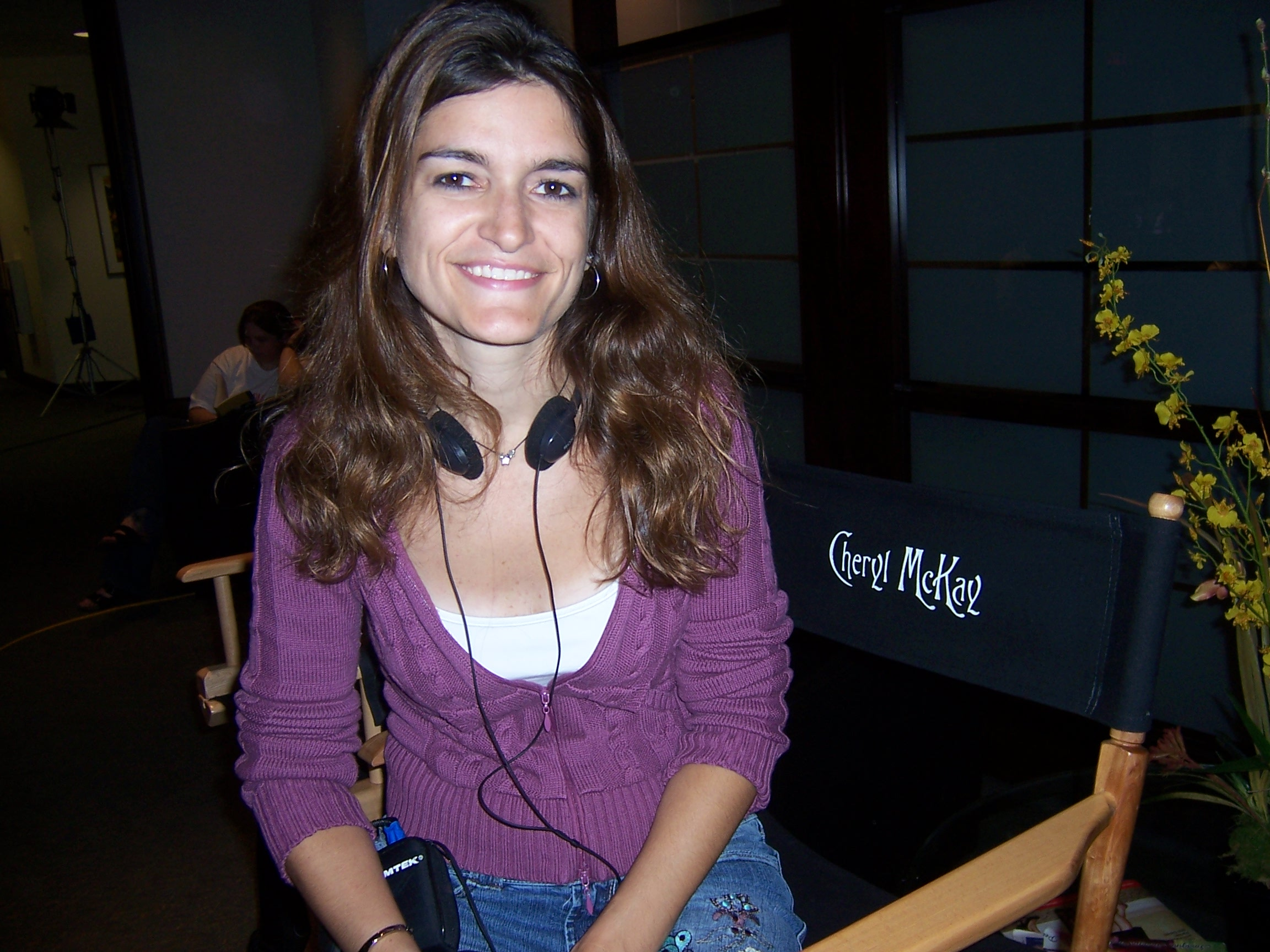
- McKay on the set of The Ultimate Gift
- Born: United States
- Occupations: Author, screenwriter

Cheryl McKay is an American author and screenwriter, from Los Angeles, California.

McKay holds an M.A. in Screenwriting from Regent University in Virginia, and is a winner of the 2006/2007 Art Within Labs award.

She wrote the screen adaptations of Jim Stovall's novel The Ultimate Gift and Sheila Walsh's children's book Gigi: God's Little Princess. McKay wrote Taylor's Wall and The Wild & Wacky Totally True Bible Stories series, narrated by Frank Peretti.

McKay cowrote Never the Bride with Rene Gutteridge.
