= The Ultimate Gift =

2006 American film by Patrick Marcotte

- Theatrical release poster
- Directed by: Michael O. Sajbel
- Screenplay by: Cheryl McKay
- Based on: The Ultimate Gift by Jim Stovall
- Produced by: Rick Eldridge; Jim Van Eerden
- Starring: Drew Fuller; Bill Cobbs; Lee Meriwether; Ali Hillis; Abigail Breslin; Brian Dennehy; James Garner
- Cinematography: Brian Baugh
- Music by: Mark McKenzie
- Production company: Fox Faith
- Distributed by: 20th Century Fox; PorchLight Entertainment
- Release dates: October 20, 2006 (Heartland); March 9, 2007 (United States)
- Running time: 117 minutes
- Country: United States
- Language: English
- Budget: $9 million
- Box office: $3.4 million

The Ultimate Gift is a 2006 American drama film directed by Michael O. Sajbel from a screenplay written by Cheryl McKay, which is based on the best selling novel by Jim Stovall. The author cameos in the film. It stars Drew Fuller, Bill Cobbs, Lee Meriwether, Ali Hillis, Abigail Breslin, Brian Dennehy, and James Garner (in his final live action film). It was released on March 9, 2007, in the United States and Canada.

Two sequels to the film, The Ultimate Life and The Ultimate Legacy, were released in 2013 and 2017 respectively.

== Plot ==
Billionaire oil magnate and grandfather Howard "Red" Stevens has passed away. His grandson, Jason Stevens, a self-centered, unemployed individual in his mid-20s who relies on his trust fund, does not anticipate inheriting anything. He harbors deep resentment towards his grandfather, as his father died while working for him. Red unexpectedly bequeaths Jason an inheritance with a stipulation: Jason must complete 12 specific tasks within a year to qualify for what Red calls (in a video) "the ultimate gift". Each task revolves around a "gift". Red's attorney and friend, Mr. Hamilton, along with his secretary, Miss Hastings, strive to assist Jason. Jason does not want to do it, but his girlfriend, Caitlin, gets him to change his mind.

For his first task, Jason is required to work on his grandfather's friend Gus Caldwell's ranch in Texas for a month to understand the value of hard work. Upon his return, Jason discovers that everything he holds dear – his apartment, car, and money – has been taken from him, leaving him destitute and homeless. Caitlin abandons him when he requests her to cover a bill after his credit card is declined. None of his friends offer him refuge, and his mother refuses to assist him as per the agreement.

Jason wanders the city in despair. While sleeping in a park, he meets a financially struggling young mother, Alexia, and her kind yet outspoken daughter, Emily. Jason forms a friendship with them and later asks them to visit the attorney's office to confirm their status as his "true friends" to complete his assignment. After he selfishly distances himself from them, Jason learns that Emily is battling leukemia. He apologizes to both of them, and Emily encourages a romantic connection between Jason and her mother. At Emily's urging, Jason brings Alexia along to Thanksgiving dinner at his family's residence. Everything proceeds smoothly until the revelation of Jason's inheritance turns the dinner into a scene of greed and chaos.

In order to complete another assignment, Jason journeys to Ecuador, where he studies in a library constructed by his father and grandfather for the benefit of the local community. This experience compels him to confront his lingering resentment regarding his father's death, prompting him to embark on a trek into the mountains with a local guide to visit the site of the incident. During this journey, Jason discovers from his guide that the narrative he had always accepted about his father's demise was a fabrication, concocted by his grandfather out of guilt and shame for attempting to coerce Jason's father into the oil industry. While in the mountains, Jason and the guide are captured and held hostage by militants for several weeks, until Jason successfully orchestrates their escape. Upon returning to America, he finds that Emily's health has worsened, leading him to arrange for Gus to host a delayed Christmas gathering at his home for them. In a moment of shared affection, Jason and Alexia share their first kiss, expressing their mutual love, while Emily watches on with joy.

After completing his twelve tasks, Jason receives a sum of $100,000,000 to use as he wishes, along with the return of all his property. Caitlin attempts to mend their relationship, but Jason turns down her proposal. With his newfound wealth, Jason decides to establish a hospital named Emily's Home, dedicated to children suffering from terminal illnesses. Tragically, before construction can commence, Emily passes away, leaving both Jason and Alexia heartbroken.

Following the groundbreaking ceremony for Emily's Home, Jason is summoned to the law firm for one final meeting. He is presented with an additional gift of over $2,000,000,000, as a reward for utilizing the initial $100,000,000 to assist others. That evening, Jason is depicted sitting on a park bench, where Alexia joins him. He expresses his gratitude for the support she and her daughter provided. They then share a kiss, as a butterfly flutters around them, potentially Emily as she believed God turns people into butterflies.

== Cast ==
- Drew Fuller as Jason Stevens
- Bill Cobbs as Mr. Theophilus Hamilton
- Abigail Breslin as Emily Rose Drummond
- Ali Hillis as Alexia Drummond
- Mircea Monroe as Caitlin
- Brett Rice as Bill Stevens
- Lee Meriwether as Miss Hastings
- Brian Dennehy as Gus Caldwell
- James Garner as Howard "Red" Stevens

In addition, then Mayor of Charlotte, North Carolina, Pat McCrory has a cameo appearance as himself, while Jim Stovall, the author of the book the film is based on, has a cameo as the limo driver near the end of the film.

== Production ==
The film was financed with $14 million from the Stanford Financial Group, a Houston based firm the U.S. Securities and Exchange Commission shut down two years later for being a "massive Ponzi scheme".

== Reception ==
=== Critical response ===
On review aggregator Rotten Tomatoes, The Ultimate Gift holds an approval rating of 32% based on 59 reviews, with an average rating of 5.20/10. The website's critical consensus reads, "Though The Ultimate Gift avoids religious speechifying like other Fox Faith films, it's dramatically inert with flat direction." On Metacritic, the film has a weighted average score of 49 out of 100, based on 16 critics, indicating "mixed or average reviews".

The New York Times' reviewer said, "Reeking of self-righteousness and moral reprimand, [the movie] is a hairball of good-for-you filmmaking..... [T]he movie's messages are methodically hammered home." Christianity Today felt the film warranted 3.5 out of 4 stars and called it "lovingly crafted ... but never manages to build up much mystery, suspense, tension, or narrative steam." Joe Leydon of Variety magazine was favorably impressed and noted that "discussions of faith and God are fleeting, almost subliminal — without stinting on the celebration of wholesome family values." William Arnold of the Seattle Post-Intelligencer wrote: "Its sincerity, optimism and air of open-minded tolerance go down well, and it makes a nice change-of-pace." He lauded its "tight and often compelling" screenplay, sparkling dialogue and "first-rate" production values.

=== Box office and home media ===
The Ultimate Gift opened with receipts of $1.2 million on its first weekend, with final box office of $3.4 million.

DVD sales were $9.55 million in the first two months following its release.

== Soundtrack ==
Mark McKenzie wrote the film's incidental music. At the film's climax, "Something Changed" is highlighted, a song composed by Contemporary Christian Music-singer Sara Groves. Other songs include "Gotta Serve Somebody" by Bob Dylan, "The Thrill is Gone" by B.B. King, and "Crazy" by Patsy Cline.

== See also ==
- Tuesdays with Morrie
