= Kalan Reed =

American football player (born 1993)

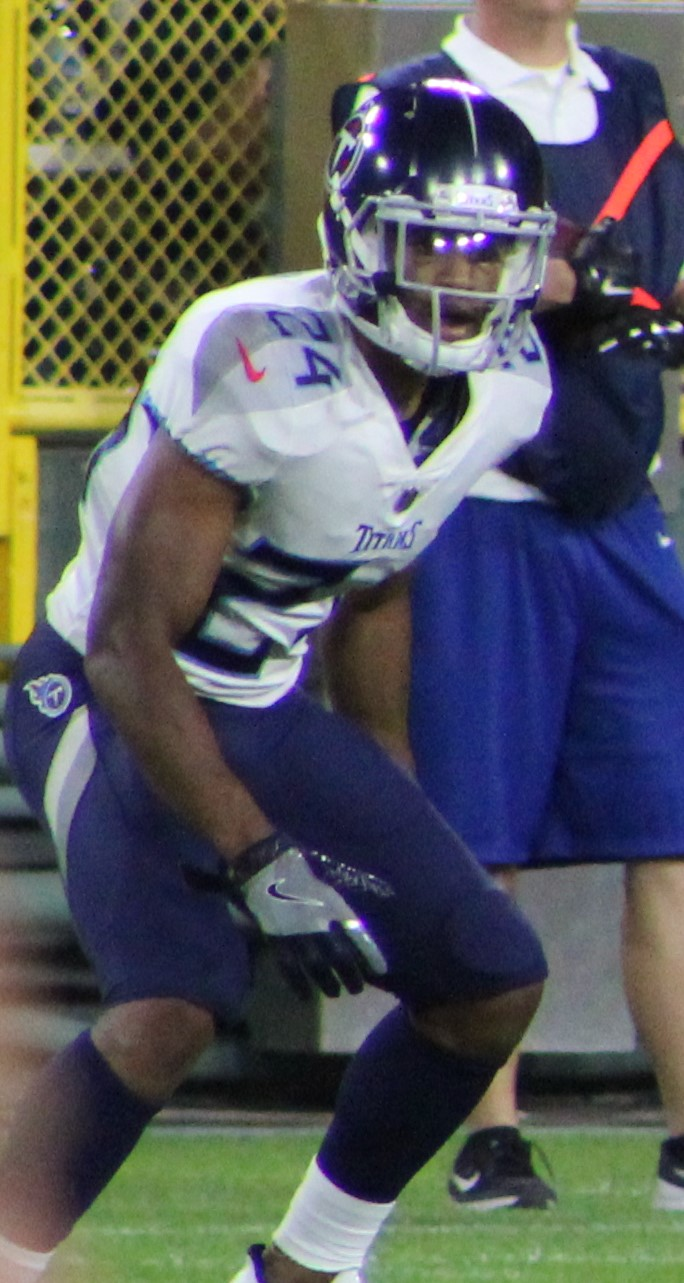
- Reed with the Tennessee Titans in 2018

No. 37, 24
- Position: Cornerback

Personal information
- Born: December 29, 1993 (age 32); Dallas, Texas, U.S.
- Listed height: 5 ft 11 in (1.80 m)
- Listed weight: 199 lb (90 kg)

Career information
- High school: Briarwood Christian (Birmingham, Alabama)
- College: Southern Miss
- NFL draft: 2016: 7th round, 253rd overall pick

Career history
- Tennessee Titans (2016–2017); Seattle Seahawks (2018–2019)

Career NFL statistics
- Total tackles: 3
- Pass deflections: 1
- Stats at Pro Football Reference

Kalan Ascher Reed (born December 29, 1993) is an American former professional football player who was a cornerback in the National Football League (NFL). He played college football for the Southern Miss Golden Eagles. Reed was Mr. Irrelevant in 2016 when the Tennessee Titans took him with the final pick of the seventh round of the 2016 NFL draft.

== Early life ==
Reed attended Briarwood Christian School in Birmingham, Alabama.

== College career ==
Reed played college football for the Southern Miss Golden Eagles from 2012 to 2015. In his freshmen season in 2012 he had 21 tackles and 1 interception. In his sophomore season in 2013 he had 41 tackles, 1 interception, and 1 forced fumble. In his junior season in 2014 he had 34 tackles and 2 interceptions. In his senior season in 2015 he had 47 tackles, 4 interceptions, and 1 forced fumble.

== Professional career ==
Pre-draft measurables
Height	Weight	Arm length	Hand span	40-yard dash	10-yard split	20-yard split	20-yard shuttle	Three-cone drill	Vertical jump	Broad jump	Bench press
5 ft 11 1/8 in (1.81 m)	192 lb (87 kg)	31 3/8 in (0.80 m)	9 in (0.23 m)	4.49 s	1.57 s	2.55 s	4.17 s	7.05 s	41.5 in (1.05 m)	10 ft 2 in (3.10 m)	11 reps
All values from Southern Mississippi's Pro Day

=== Tennessee Titans ===
The Tennessee Titans selected Reed in the seventh round (253rd overall) of the 2016 NFL draft, making him the 43rd Mr. Irrelevant.

On May 9, 2016, the Titans signed Reed to a four-year, $2.39 million contract that includes a signing bonus of $58,540. On September 2, Reed was released by the Titans as part of final roster cuts and was signed to the practice squad the next day. On November 28, Reed was promoted to the active roster.

On August 20, 2018, Reed was placed on injured reserve after suffering a broken foot. He was released on August 27.

=== Seattle Seahawks ===
On October 3, 2018, Reed was signed to the Seattle Seahawks' practice squad. On November 6, Reed was promoted to the main roster.

On August 27, 2019, Reed was placed on injured reserve with a likely career-ending neck injury.

Reed did not receive a restricted free agent tender from the team after the season, and became a free agent on March 18, 2020.

== Coaching career ==
Following his playing career, Reed joined the Tennessee Titans organization as a scout. On June 21, 2025, Reed was promoted to the role of college scout.
