= Rose Reid =

American actress

- Born: Nashville, Tennessee, U.S.
- Occupation: Actress
- Years active: 2016–present
- Known for: Finding You; The World We Make; Surprised by Oxford; The Shift

Rose Reid is an American actress and screenwriter from Nashville, Tennessee.

== Career ==
She played the lead in the film Finding You (2021).

In 2025, she starred in the Angel Studios science fiction film The Lightning Code, for which she also received a writing credit.

== Filmography ==
=== Film ===
Year	Title	Role	Notes
2016	I'm Not Ashamed	Kim	
2017	Sweet Sweet Summertime	Victoria	
2019	The World We Make	Lee Grove	Also writer
2021	Finding You	Finley Sinclair	
2022	Surprised by Oxford	Caro Drake	
2023	The Shift	Tina	
2025	The Lightning Code	Kennedy Blake	Also writer
2025	Lone Rider	Alice	Post-production

=== Television ===
Year	Title	Role	Notes
2020	A Welcome Home Christmas	Trish Barnes	TV movie
2023	A Thousand Tomorrows	Ali Daniels	Miniseries
2026	The Pendragon Cycle: Rise of the Merlin	Charis	Main role; Also writer and co-producer
