= Hotel Costiera =

Italian television series

- Italian promotional release poster
- Genre: Action; Drama
- Created by: Elena Bucaccio; Francesco Arlanch
- Directed by: Adam Bernstein; Giacomo Martelli
- Starring: Jesse Williams; Jordan Alexandra; Maria Chiara Giannetta; Antonio Gerardi; Sam Haygarth; Tommaso Ragno; Pierpaolo Spollon; Amanda Campana; Jess Khan-Lee; Chloé Hirschman; Jess Liaudin
- Music by: Anton Sanko
- Country of origin: Italy
- Original language: English
- No. of seasons: 1
- No. of episodes: 6

Production
- Executive producers: Daniele Passani; Corrado Trionfera; Jesse Williams; Adam Bernstein; Matthew Parkhill; Matilde Bernabei
- Producer: Luca Bernabei
- Cinematography: Alessandro Pesci
- Editors: Sadaf Nazari; Davide Miele
- Running time: 39–43 minutes
- Production companies: Amazon MGM Studios; Lux Vide

Original release
- Network: Amazon Prime Video
- Release: 24 September 2025

Hotel Costiera is an English-language Italian action drama television series created by Elena Bucaccio and Francesco Arlanch. It stars Jesse Williams as Daniel "DD" De Luca, a fixer at a luxury hotel on the Amalfi Coast. It was released on Amazon Prime Video on 24 September 2025. In December 2025, the series was canceled after one season.

== Premise ==
Daniel De Luca, a former Marine, returns to Italy to work at a luxury hotel in Positano. Shortly thereafter, the owner's daughter disappears, and De Luca is tasked with finding her.

== Cast and characters ==
=== Main ===
- Jesse Williams as Daniel "DD" De Luca
- Jordan Alexandra as Genny
- Maria Chiara Giannetta as Adele, the general manager of the Hotel Costiera and Augusto's older daughter
- Antonio Gerardi as Bignè, a former criminal turned bar owner serving as Daniel's trusted informant
- Sam Haygarth as Tancredi
- Tommaso Ragno as Augusto, the owner of the Hotel Costiera
- Pierpaolo Spollon as Bruno
- Amanda Campana as Alice, Augusto's younger daughter and Adele's younger sister
- Jess Khan-Lee as April Mackenzie
- Chloé Hirschman as Sabine
- Jess Liaudin as Le Bris

=== Supporting ===
- Alejandra Onieva as Sheryl
- James Faulkner as Aaron Tarsky
- Ellie Pierce as Julia Tarsky
- Christy Meyer as Jackie Tarsky
- Elettra Lamborghini as Elettra
- Domenico Cuomo as Dario
- Cristina Donadio as Teresa
- Nunzia Schiano as Nonna
- Giovanni Ludeno as Ferdinando Esposito
- Jean-Hugues Anglade as Laurent
- Emilien Vekemans as Bastien

== Episodes ==
| No. | Title | Directed by | Written by | Original release date |
|---|---|---|---|---|
| 1 | "Sheryl" | Adam Bernstein | Elena Bucaccio, Matthew Parkhill, and Francesco Arlanch | 24 September 2025 |
| 2 | "Richard" | Adam Bernstein | Elena Bucaccio, Matthew Parkhill, and Francesco Arlanch | 24 September 2025 |
| 3 | "April" | Adam Bernstein | Story by : Francesco Arlanch and Elena Bucaccio; Teleplay by : Francesco Arlanch & Elena Bucaccio and Trey Ellis | 24 September 2025 |
| 4 | "Hassan" | Giacomo Martelli | Francesco Arlanch, Elena Bucaccio, James Dormer, and Matthew Parkhill | 24 September 2025 |
| 5 | "Bruno" | Giacomo Martelli | Francesco Arlanch, Elena Bucaccio, and Matthew Parkhill | 24 September 2025 |
| 6 | "Alice" | Giacomo Martelli | Matthew Parkhill | 24 September 2025 |

== Production ==
The series was announced in mid-2023. It was originally written in Italian, but later translated to English. Jesse Williams was announced as a cast member on 27 February 2024. Filming began in late February 2024, and took place in Positano and around the Amalfi Coast.

On December 10, 2025, Amazon Prime Video canceled Hotel Costiera after one season.

== Release ==
Promotional stills were released in July 2024, and the series was previewed at Series Mania in March 2025. It was also previewed at the Taormina Film Fest in June 2025. A trailer was released on 25 August 2025. The series was released on Amazon Prime Video on 24 September 2025.

== Reception ==
The review aggregator website Rotten Tomatoes reported an 89% approval rating based on 9 critic reviews. Metacritic, which uses a weighted average, gave a score of 54 out of 100 based on 4 critics, indicating "mixed or average".
