= The World We Make =

- Directed by: Brian Baugh
- Written by: Brian Baugh; Chris Dowling; George D. Escobar
- Starring: Caleb Castille; Rose Reid
- Release date: April 19, 2019
- Running time: 108 minutes
- Country: United States
- Language: English

The World We Make is a 2019 American drama film written by Brian Baugh, Chris Dowling and George D. Escobar, directed by Baugh and starring Caleb Castille and Rose Reid.

The World We Make is a romance drama that revolves around 18-year-old equestrian Lee Grove and student-athlete Jordan Bishop, who find solace and comfort in each other following a tragedy. But their developing relationship draws out the ingrained racial prejudices that they didn’t know existed in their charming little town. As they strive to build a life together, Lee and Jordan must ensure that they support each other through all the ups and downs.

== Plot ==
Lee and her older brother Casey have inherited their love for horses from their late mother. Casey suggests that they should go on a cross-country horse-riding trip together after Lee graduates from high school. Lee happily agrees as it will give her time to figure out what she wants to do with her life. But after Casey’s death in a tragic car accident, Lee’s life suddenly undergoes some drastic changes. Her father, Jeff, retreats into his garage, devoting himself to finishing the car that he was rebuilding for Casey.

Meanwhile, Lee is forced to shoulder all the responsibilities of the grieving family alone. Ultimately, help arrives in the shape of Casey’s best friend, Jordan. Despite his fear of horses, Jordan helps Lee out in the barn. He also spends time with Lee’s younger brother Logan. As the film progresses, a relationship begins to develop between Lee and Jordan, garnering the attention of both sides of the racial divide.

Unlike Lee, Jordan seems to have everything figured out. He presently attends a local college but already has secured enrolment into a prestigious college in California on a football scholarship. He intends to attend the business school there. But his life is not without problems, most of which stem from his father, Thomas, who lost all of Jordan’s college money in gambling. When Jordan and Lee begin dating, it ends up making his life more complicated. Jordan has become accustomed to being racially profiled, but the looks he receives whenever he is out with Lee surprise even him.

As the people of their town become aware of their relationship, the hostilities that Jordan experiences increase abruptly. Even Lee seems to have her share of biases. This is indicated when she asks Jordan to play basketball with Logan, believing that he will be naturally good at the sport. When Jordan corrects her and tells her not to make assumptions, she is instantly apologetic. After they start dating, he gradually occupies Casey’s vacant place in their family for both Logan and Jeff.

The latter even lets Jordan have the first ride in Casey’s car when it is fully rebuilt. However, the car draws the attention of some of Lee’s classmates, and the altercation with them lands Jordan in hospital. For the first time in their lives, Lee and her family realize the casual racism that Jordan is exposed to every day. As for Lee, she faces her own share of racial biases as well, especially from Thomas.

Seeing that the society around them is adamant about keeping them apart, Lee and Jordan create a world of their own. This does not prove to be a safe place when real-world issues start to invade. Jordan’s doctors have advised him not to play football again if he wants to avoid permanent brain damage. He is aware that without football, his scholarship will not exist. As he does not want to take out a student loan, Jordan is forced to ask his father for a job at Thomas’s workplace.

Jordan breaks up with Lee and resigns himself to his fate until Lee comes to his rescue. At the beginning of the film, Jeff offhandedly comments that Lee should sell Casey’s horse if she feels overwhelmed by her responsibilities. She holds on to the horse for as long as she can. After all, it is the last connection she feels she has with her brother. As long as she can ride it, she doesn’t have to acknowledge that her brother is gone. So, when she finally sells the horse, grief begins to pour out of her.

Despite the two being broken up, Lee donated some money to Jordan so that he could start to attend college, helping his dreams get back on track. In the time period of a few months, Jordan’s dreams were her dreams as well. and even though their relationship has ended, Jordan didn't stop being one of the most important people in Lee's life.

Jordan has let himself be convinced that they don’t belong together. Lee’s actions clear any doubt that he might have about their relationship. He realizes that she is not just willing to stand by him during his troubles; she also wants to help him overcome them actively. Beyond all the differences they have, a relationship like that is rare. And he shouldn’t let go of it this easily. Eventually, the world they made for themselves is reinforced and expanded, encompassing their respective families, including Thomas, who seems to have come to the same conclusion as Jordan.

The horseshoe originally belongs to Casey. He had plans to throw it into the Pacific Ocean at the end of the horse-riding trip. After his passing, Jordan overcomes his fear and learns how to ride a horse, which helps him recover after the assault. Following their reconciliation, Lee and Jordan take the trip together, with Jeff and Logan following them by car. The trip that Casey originally planned gives his family and best friend a chance to find catharsis. The film ends as Lee throws the horseshoe into the ocean, fulfilling Casey’s final wish.

== Cast ==
- Rose Reid as Lee Grove
- Caleb Castille as Jordan Bishop
- Gregory Alan Williams as Thomas Bishop
- Kevin Sizemore as Jeff Grove
- Candace West as Kimani

== Production ==
The film was shot in Williamson County, Tennessee.

== Release ==
The film was released in select theaters on April 19, 2019.

== Reception ==
Barbara Shulgasser-Parker of Common Sense Media awarded the film three stars out of five. Roger Moore of Movie Nation awarded the film one star out of four.
