= Finding You (film) =

2021 film by Brian Baugh

- Theatrical release poster
- Directed by: Brian Baugh
- Screenplay by: Brian Baugh
- Based on: There You'll Find Me by Jenny B. Jones
- Produced by: Ken Carpenter; Julie Ryan; Brian Baugh; Stephen Preston
- Starring: Rose Reid; Jedidiah Goodacre; Katherine McNamara; Patrick Bergin; Saoirse-Monica Jackson; Judith Hoag; Tom Everett Scott; Vanessa Redgrave
- Cinematography: Michael Lavelle
- Edited by: Chris Witt
- Music by: Timothy Williams; Kieran Kiely
- Production companies: Nook Lane Entertainment; Red Sky Studios; MK1 Productions
- Distributed by: Roadside Attractions
- Release date: May 14, 2021
- Running time: 119 minutes
- Country: United States
- Language: English
- Box office: $3.3 million

Finding You is a 2021 American coming-of-age romantic comedy written and directed by Brian Baugh, based on the 2011 young adult novel There You'll Find Me by Jenny B. Jones. It stars Rose Reid, Jedidiah Goodacre and Katherine McNamara.

Aspiring violinist Finley and rising actor Beckett begin an unlikely romance, but when forces surrounding his stardom threaten to crush their dreams, she must decide what she will risk for love.

The film was released theatrically in the United States by Roadside Attractions on May 14, 2021.

== Plot ==
Violinist Finley Sinclair does an student exchange program in Ireland after failing an audition to enter a New York City music conservatory. As her late brother Alex also participated in the program, she hopes it inspires her.

On the flight, Finley is bumped up to business class. She inadvertently falls asleep on the shoulder of famous actor Beckett Rush. He is heading to Ireland to shoot the latest in the Dawn of the Dragon fantasy film series. Finley regards him as arrogant.

Upon landing, Beckett is immediately swamped by fans. Finley is greeted by Alex's former Irish host family, Nora and Sean Callaghan, and their teenage daughter Emma, a Beckett megafan. The family recently inherited a bed and breakfast (B&B). The next morning, Finley discovers Beckett is also staying there.

On set, Beckett's manager-father Montgomery reminds him to keep the director happy, as a multiple-film deal is at stake. At the B&B, Nora gives Finley Alex's notebook, full of notes and sketches. Intrigued by the last, unfinished one of a grave with a broken Celtic cross in a churchyard with a church ruin labeled Finley, finding it becomes her goal.

Beckett convinces Finley to help him run his lines, in exchange for helping her find the location of the sketch and see the sights. In her extension course, Finley must complete a 20-hour service contract, accompanying the cantankerous local senior citizen Mrs. Cathleen Sweeney, then write a paper on it. Cathleen is rumored to have married her sister Fiona Doyle's boyfriend for his money.

In town, Finley meets drunken fiddler Seamus and pub owner Molly. Beckett catches up to her, taking her to see the Cliffs of Moher. He confesses he wishes he could live incognito. Later, when Finley stops by set to run lines, she meets Becket's co-star and supposed love interest Taylor. He pops into the nursing home where she is reading to Cathleen, charming her.

Beckett takes Finley to Molly's pub, where someone guards against paparazzi. Seamus shows her to play the 'fiddle' with joy, freely and with emotion. Later, she and Beckett kiss. Back at the B&B, he suggests they keep it to themselves to protect her from the tabloids. Beckett tells her his father regularly feeds the press false information about him being involved in love triangles to generate publicity, to his chagrin.

A photograph taken of Beckett and Finley kissing at a local festival is revealed to Taylor, and his lodgings are leaked to the press. Taylor and Montgomery confront Beckett and Finley at the B&B. Montgomery uses emotional blackmail to pressure Beckett to sign the film deal and break up with Finley to continue the ruse with Taylor.

Meanwhile, Finley tries to help Cathleen reconnect with Fiona, without her knowledge, but cannot convince her to visit. Cathleen eventually reveals she took Fiona’s place when their gambling father had offered wealthy Mr. Sweeney to marry Fiona to pay debts. She did so as he was physically abusive. Fiona had no idea.

Although Cathleen wrote many explanatory letters to Fiona later on, all have been returned, unopened. Beckett and Finley try again, explaining Cathleen had been protecting her. Yet, Fiona turns them away.

About to return home for her audition, Finley learns Cathleen is alone on her death bed, so misses the flight to support her. Fiona shows in time to make peace with her. By chance, Beckett sees the cross from Alex's sketch, sending Finley the location.

Finley visits it, reading its inscription: "The Lord himself goes before you / And will be with you: / He will never leave you / Nor forsake you. / Do not be afraid; / Do not be discouraged." [Deuteronomy 31:8]. She feels the message came from Alex just when she needed it.

Finley meets Beckett, who thought she was gone. He tells her he is not doing the multiple-film deal. Instead, he will do one more movie so the film crew can move on from the franchise, then attend college in NYC.

Finley is allowed to postpone her audition, then successfully secures admission to the conservatory. Once she and Beckett are both living in New York they date, she at the conservatory and he at college.

== Cast ==
- Rose Reid as Finley Sinclair
- Jedidiah Goodacre as Beckett Rush
- Katherine McNamara as Taylor Risdale
- Patrick Bergin as Seamus
- Saoirse-Monica Jackson as Emma Callaghan
- Judith Hoag as Jennifer Sinclair
- Tom Everett Scott as Montgomery Rush
- Vanessa Redgrave as Cathleen Sweeney
- Natalie Britton as Gemma Quinlan
- Fiona Bell as Nora
- Marion O'Dwyer as Molly
- Anabel Sweeney as Keeva
- Helen Roche as Fiona Doyle

== Production ==
Filming was in Ireland, in and around Dublin, Clare, Offaly, Kildare, Cooley and Carlingford, County Louth; and also in New York City, Los Angeles and Nashville. In September 2020, it was announced that Roadside Attractions had acquired the film's US theatrical distribution rights from Red Sky Studios, Nook Lane Entertainment and MK1 Studios. The film's initial title, There You'll Find Me, was renamed to Finding You.

== Release ==
The film was released theatrically in the United States on May 14, 2021, by Roadside Attractions.

== Reception ==
=== Box office ===
Finding You was projected to gross $532,000-$1 million in its opening weekend. It made $323,000 from 1,314 theaters on its first day, and $954,000 over its opening weekend.

=== Critical response ===
On review aggregator Rotten Tomatoes, 53% of 38 reviews were positive, with an average rating of 5.2/10. The website's critics consensus reads: "Although Finding You manages to fit every contrivance possible into its story, its charming fluff and sharp humor may be enough to win the hearts of romance fans." Metacritic, which uses a weighted average, assigned the film a score of 41 out of 100, based on 9 critics, indicating "mixed or average" reviews. Audiences surveyed by PostTrak gave the film a 71% positive score, with 46% saying they would definitely recommend it.

Giving the film 2.5 out of 4 stars, Michael O'Sullivan positively reviewed the film for the Washington Post, writing that although it contained "no real surprises... Finding You kinda, sorta [works]." Plugged In (publication) reviewer Paul Asay opined that while the story is "fairly predictable", it illustrated well "that sex and romance aren't synonymous; that kindness matters; and that even in moments of disappointment, God may be operating behind the scenes." Tara McNamara of Common Sense Media commented on the film's religious themes, writing that "the movie's faith-based element has a mic-drop moment, but it happens without a single line of dialogue and isn't jarring or forced." McNamara gave the film 3 out of 5 stars, praising the well-assembled cast and the setting in the Irish countryside, noting that the film was more a coming-of-age story than a romance.

In a mixed review for the Los Angeles Times, Michael Ordoña praised many of the cast members but criticized the film's determination "to be PG-clean" and Finley's character, saying she lacked personality. Giving the film a grade of "C", Adam Graham of the Detroit News opined that the film was heavily clichéd and lacked anything of substance "except for the exquisite greenery of Ireland." Kate Erbland of Indie Wire gave it a "C−" grade, deriding it for its predictability, but noting that it contained "brief moments of magic". Erbland says "flashes of sweetness and smartness are stuck in between increasingly odd twists and tropes, eager to play up the "Notting Hill" of it all without actually doing the work to make it stick."
