= Simeon Castille =

American football player (born 1985)

No. 21, 26, 27
- Position: Cornerback

Personal information
- Born: October 12, 1985 (age 41); Phenix City, Alabama, U.S.
- Listed height: 6 ft 0 in (1.83 m)
- Listed weight: 195 lb (88 kg)

Career information
- High school: Briarwood Christian (Birmingham, Alabama)
- College: Alabama
- NFL draft: 2008: undrafted

Career history
- Cincinnati Bengals (2008); San Diego Chargers (2009); Florida Tuskers (2010); Minnesota Vikings (2010–2011)*; Virginia Destroyers (2011); Orlando Predators (2012–2013); San Jose SaberCats (2014)
- * Offseason or practice squad member only

Awards and highlights
- UFL champion (2011); 2× First-team All-SEC (2006, 2007)

Career NFL statistics
- Total tackles: 7
- Pass deflections: 1
- Stats at Pro Football Reference

Career AFL statistics
- Total tackles: 169
- Pass deflections: 41
- Interceptions: 15
- Stats at ArenaFan.com

Simeon Castille (born October 12, 1985) is an American former professional football player who was a cornerback in the National Football League (NFL). He played college football for the Alabama Crimson Tide. He owns and operates Stille Academy a training facility in Pelham, Alabama.

== Early life ==
He was a high school All-American and State Champion at Briarwood Christian School. He played college football at the University of Alabama.

== Professional career ==
He was signed by the Cincinnati Bengals as an undrafted free agent in 2008.

On February 3, 2014, the Orlando Predators traded Castille was to the San Jose SaberCats in exchange for Quentin Sims, Andre Freeman and Syd'Quan Thompson.

== Personal life ==
His father, Jeremiah, and brother, Tim, also played football in the NFL after attending Alabama. He married his wife Raquel Castille on August 14, 2018. They have three children: Simeon, Israel, and Selah. They attend and are active members of All Christ Church in Birmingham, Alabama. He opened Stille Academy in 2020. Castille was featured in American Underdog as Isaac Bruce in December 2021.

Simeon's brother, Caleb Castille, is an actor who starred in the movie Woodlawn, and is a member of the cast of the TV series, NCIS: Los Angeles.
