= Grove City College =

Christian college in Grove City, Pennsylvania, US

- Former name: Pine Grove Normal Academy (1876–1884)
- Motto: Lux Mea (Latin)
- Motto in English: My Light
- Type: Private Christian liberal arts college
- Established: 1876; 150 years ago
- Religious affiliation: Nondenominational; formerly informally affiliated with Presbyterian Church (USA)
- Endowment: $270 million (2025)
- President: Bradley J. Lingo
- Faculty: 150
- Undergraduates: 2,400
- Location: Grove City, Pennsylvania, U.S. 41°9′22″N 80°4′48″W
- Campus: Rural 180 acres (0.28 sq mi)
- Colors: (Red and white)
- Nickname: Wolverines
- Sporting affiliations: NCAA Division III – PAC; CWPA
- Mascot: Willie the Wolverine
- Website: gcc.edu
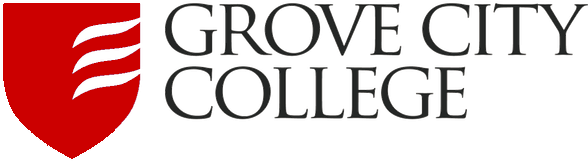

Grove City College (GCC) is a private, conservative Christian liberal arts college in Grove City, Pennsylvania, United States. It was founded in 1876 as a normal school. The college emphasizes a humanities core curriculum. The college has always been formally non-denominational but in its first few decades its students and faculty were dominated by members of the Presbyterian Church to the extent that it was sometimes described as having a de facto Presbyterian affiliation; in more recent decades, it moved away from the Presbyterian Church.

== History ==
=== Founding ===
The school was founded, chartered as "Pine Grove Normal Academy", in 1876 by Isaac C. Ketler. It had twenty-six students in its first year. In 1884, the trustees of Pine Grove Normal Academy in Grove City amended the academy charter to change the name to "Grove City College". By charter, the doors of the College were open to qualified students "without regard to religious test or belief." Isaac Ketler served as president until 1913.

Grove City was also supported by Joseph Newton Pew, founder of the Sun Oil Company. Pew and Ketler's sons Weir C. Ketler and John Howard Pew later went on to become Grove City president and president of the board of trustees, respectively. During the summer of 1925, J. Gresham Machen gave the lectures that formed the basis of his book, What Is Faith?

=== World War II ===
As World War II began, Grove City College was one of six schools selected by the United States Navy to participate in the highly unusual Electronics Training Program (ETP). Starting in March 1942, each month a new group of 100 Navy and Marine students arrived for three months of 14-hour days of concentrated electrical engineering study. ETP admission required passing the Eddy Test, one of the most selective qualifying exams during the war years. Professor Russell P. Smith was the program's Director of Instruction. By the fall of 1943, there were only 81 civilian men in the student body, and the presence of 300 or more servicemen contributed greatly to sustaining the College. This training at Grove City continued until April 1945; library records show that 49 classes graduated 3,759 persons.

=== Supreme Court case ===
Under President Charles S. MacKenzie, the college was the plaintiff-appellee in the landmark 1984 U.S. Supreme Court case Grove City College v. Bell. The ruling came seven years after the school refused to sign a Title IX compliance form, which would have subjected the entire school at all times to current federal regulations in force. The court ruled 6–3 that acceptance by students of federal educational grants fell under the regulatory requirements of Title IX, but limited the application to the school's financial aid department.

In 1988, new legislation subjected every department of any educational institution that received federal funding to Title IX requirements. In response, Grove City College from the 1988–1989 academic year withdrew entirely from the Pell Grant program, replacing its grants to students with funding from its own Student Freedom Fund. In October 1996, the college withdrew from the Stafford Loan program, providing entering students with replacements through a program with PNC Bank.

Grove City is one of a handful of colleges that does not receive federal grants, loans, or scholarships.

=== 21st century ===
From 1963 until 2016, the American Association of University Professors placed Grove City under censure for violations of tenure and academic freedom in response to the dismissal of Professor of History and Political Science Larry Gara at the direct behest of the Chairman of the Board J. Howard Pew. By the end of this period, Grove City's administration had been on the AAUP's list of censured administrations longer than any other college on the list. In its report, the AAUP Investigative Committee at Grove City concluded that "the absence of due process [in the dismissal of professors at Grove City] raises... doubts regarding the academic security of any persons who may hold an appointment at Grove City College under existing administrative practice. These doubts are of an order of magnitude which obliges us to report them to the academic profession at large." In 2013 Grove City started working to remove itself from the censure list. Two years later, the school admitted that they would have handled Gara's case differently under their current procedures, leading the AAUP to lift its sanction on the school at its 2016 annual meeting. The school apologised to Gara in October 2015.

In 2005, Grove City founded the conservative think-tank the Center for Vision and Values, renamed the Institute for Faith & Freedom in April 2019, saying that it "more clearly aligns it with the historic values of the College."

Since the early 21st century the college has engaged in several new construction projects, including an expansion to its music and arts center in 2002, a new academic building in 2003, a new student union/bookstore in 2004, and new apartment-style housing in 2006. Grove City's Student Union building was awarded the International Masonry Institute's Golden Trowel Grand Prize for excellence in masonry design and construction in 2005. On February 9, 2011, Grove City College announced that it would break ground for construction of a science, engineering, and mathematics building, key components of Grove City Matters: A Campaign to Advance Grove City College, which at US$90 million is the largest capital campaign in the college's history. The $37.2 million science, engineering, and mathematics building is designed to support new modes of teaching, particularly flexible laboratories and small-group interactions. STEM Hall was opened in August 2013, providing laboratory space for students studying biology, chemistry, physics, and computer science. In 2021 the Henry Buhl Library underwent major renovation, adding classroom space, updated study areas, and a cafe.

==== Observatory ====
The college acquired an astronomical observatory with three buildings and equipment from Edinboro University of Pennsylvania in February 2008, to be used for education, with an astronomy minor, and research. The observatory's telescopes are operated remotely from the college's main campus more than 60 miles (97 km) away. The college's physics department intended to use the observatory to work with other educational institutions in the area.

== Academics ==
Grove City offers 55 majors in the liberal arts, sciences, and engineering. The college is accredited by the Middle States Commission on Higher Education. The college's electrical, computer, and mechanical engineering programs are accredited by the Accreditation Board for Engineering and Technology, Inc. (ABET). The Bachelor of Science in Social Work program was approved as a candidate for specialized accreditation offered through the Council on Social Work Education. In 2019, Grove City announced a new partnership with Butler County Community College to provide a Bachelor of Science in Nursing degree.

Grove City intends to provide a Christian environment and traditional humanities curriculum. A three-year required humanities sequence focuses on the origin, development, and implications of civilization's seminal ideas and worldviews. The courses cover content that includes religion, philosophy, history and philosophy of science, literature, art and music. Grove City College claims to adhere to principles of freedom and minimal government interference; it teaches the ideas of the Austrian School of Economics. The post-1938 personal papers of Ludwig Von Mises are housed in the archive of Grove City College. Grove City College also hosts the annual Austrian Student Scholars Conference every February: a group of students from around the United States present research papers on the history of economic thought or on current developments within the Austrian School of Thought. In addition to traditional business programs, Grove City offers degrees in Entrepreneurship and in Business Economics.

=== Reputation and rankings ===
Grove City College was ranked 225 of 498 in the 2023 Forbes list of Top Colleges, and 4 of 41 in its region in the 2024 U.S. News & World Report Rankings.

Academic rankings

Regional
- U.S. News & World Report: 4 of 41

National
- Forbes: 225 of 500

It is also ranked as number 2 in Best Value Schools in the 2026 U.S. News & World Report Rankings.

=== Think tanks ===
Although it is a small liberal arts college, Grove City's faculty and administrators significantly influence and impact the ideas of various think tanks around the USA, especially on issues involving the environment, education, minimum wage, and other issues economic and conservative. Grove City College has international ties, founded in 1955, and on the International Society for Individual Liberty (ISIL) Freedom Network.

The Lone Mountain Coalition, part of the Property and Environment Research Center, which claims to be "America's oldest and largest institute dedicated to original research that brings market principles to resolving environmental problems", has ties to Grove City through Michael Coulter, Vice-President of the Shenango Institute for Public Policy, and associate professor of political science at Grove City College.

Several members of the Ludwig von Mises Institute, a libertarian academic organization, are also faculty at Grove City.

Lawrence W. (Larry) Reed, president of Michigan's Mackinac Center for Public Policy, received his B.A. degree in Economics from Grove City in 1975. Reed is al former president of the State Policy Network.

The Academic Advisory Committee of the John Locke Foundation, a free market think tank in North Carolina, which supports the John William Pope Center for Higher Education Policy, a nonprofit institute dedicated to improving higher education in North Carolina and the nation, includes Walter E. Williams, the John M. Olin Distinguished Professor of Economics, George Mason University, holder of a Doctor of Humane Letters from Grove City College and John Moore, a former president of Grove City College, who led the college through its withdrawal from federal student loan programs as described in a previous section.

=== Policies and environment ===
When it opened, Grove City College was one of the first institutions of higher learning in the United States to admit both male and female students. The school maintains approximately the same number of men and women students.

Drinking alcoholic beverages on campus, or returning inebriated from elsewhere, is strictly forbidden. Student organizations must adopt a strong policy regarding alcohol.

In 2012, The Princeton Review listed Grove City College as the 2nd most LGBT-unfriendly school in the United States. In 2013 Grove City was at #1 in the Princeton Review’s rankings of most LGBT-unfriendly schools in America. As of 2016, they were ranked 9th.

By refusing to accept federal funds and Title IV financial aid (from the Higher Education Act of 1965), Grove City is not required to adhere to federal guidelines that (i) prevent sex-based and many other forms of discrimination (e.g., Title IX of the Education Amendments of 1972), (ii) regulate investigations into accusations of sexual abuse, (iii) require the collecting and sharing of information about crimes on campus (Clery Act), and (iv) set standards for disciplinary proceedings (Campus Sexual Violence Elimination Act).

=== Religious facilities ===
Grove City College has always been officially non-denominational, but in its first decades had a de facto affiliation with the Presbyterian Church; today, it is no longer tied to a particular Christian denomination. The Department of Biblical & Religious Studies is composed of confessionally Reformed professors from various denominational backgrounds. Students are required to attend a certain number of chapel services per semester, including during the COVID-19 pandemic.

Harbison Chapel has been a longstanding campus facility for Christian services. In 2012, Rathburn Hall was built to function as an office space for chapel staff, meeting space for religious groups, and a lounge area for visiting speakers.

Grove City campus and buildings

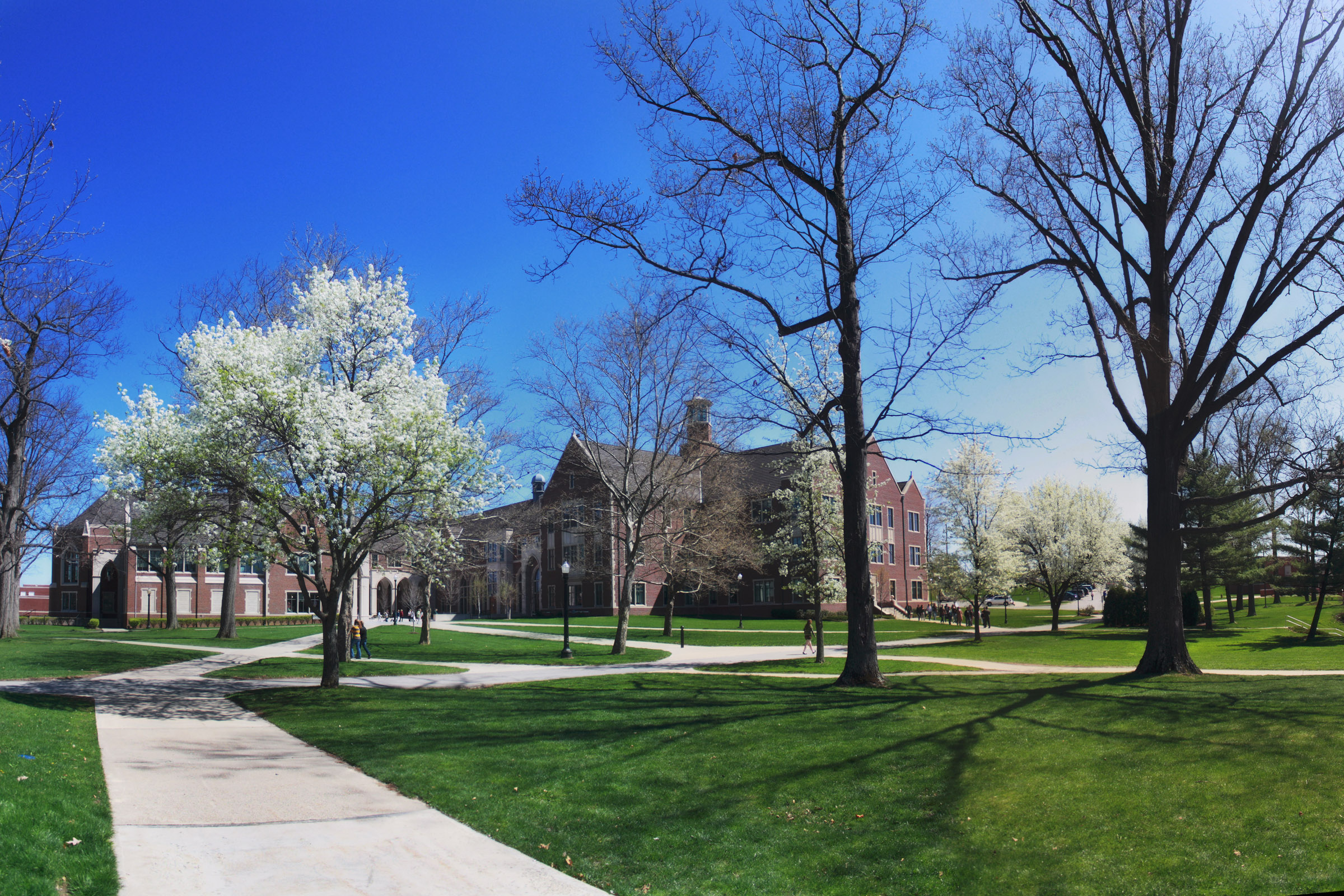
View of the campus

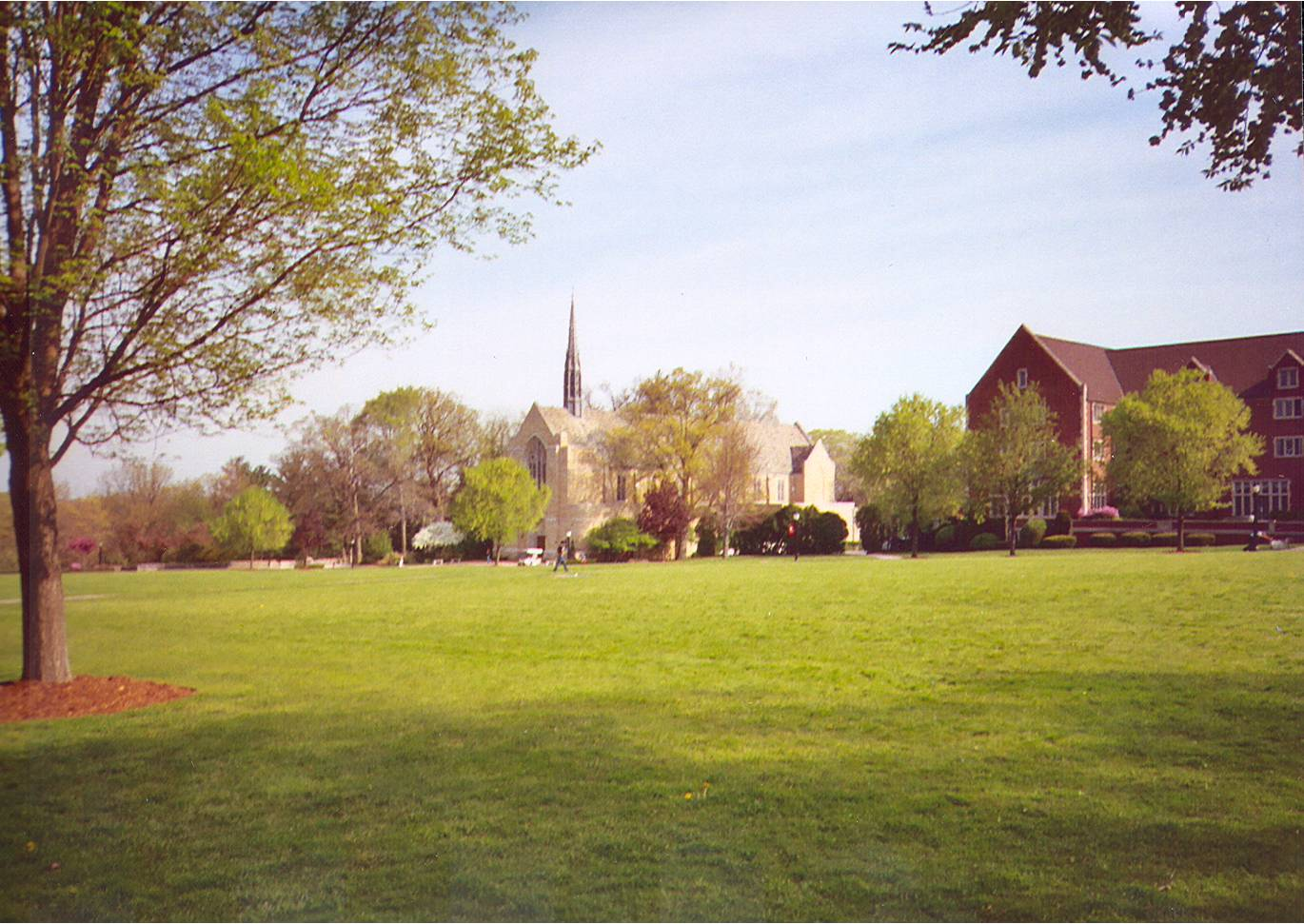
Central quad in the spring

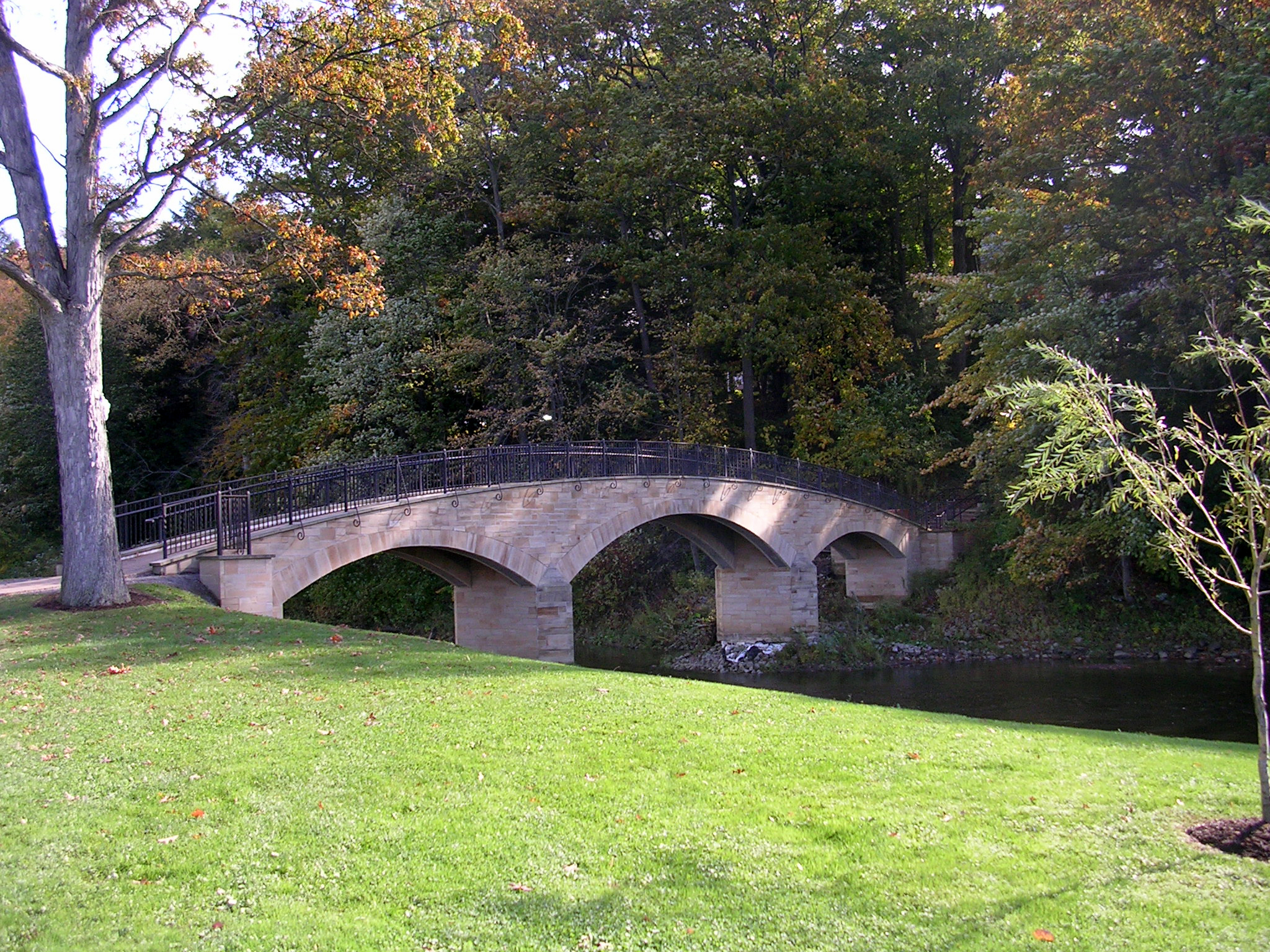
Rainbow Bridge stretches

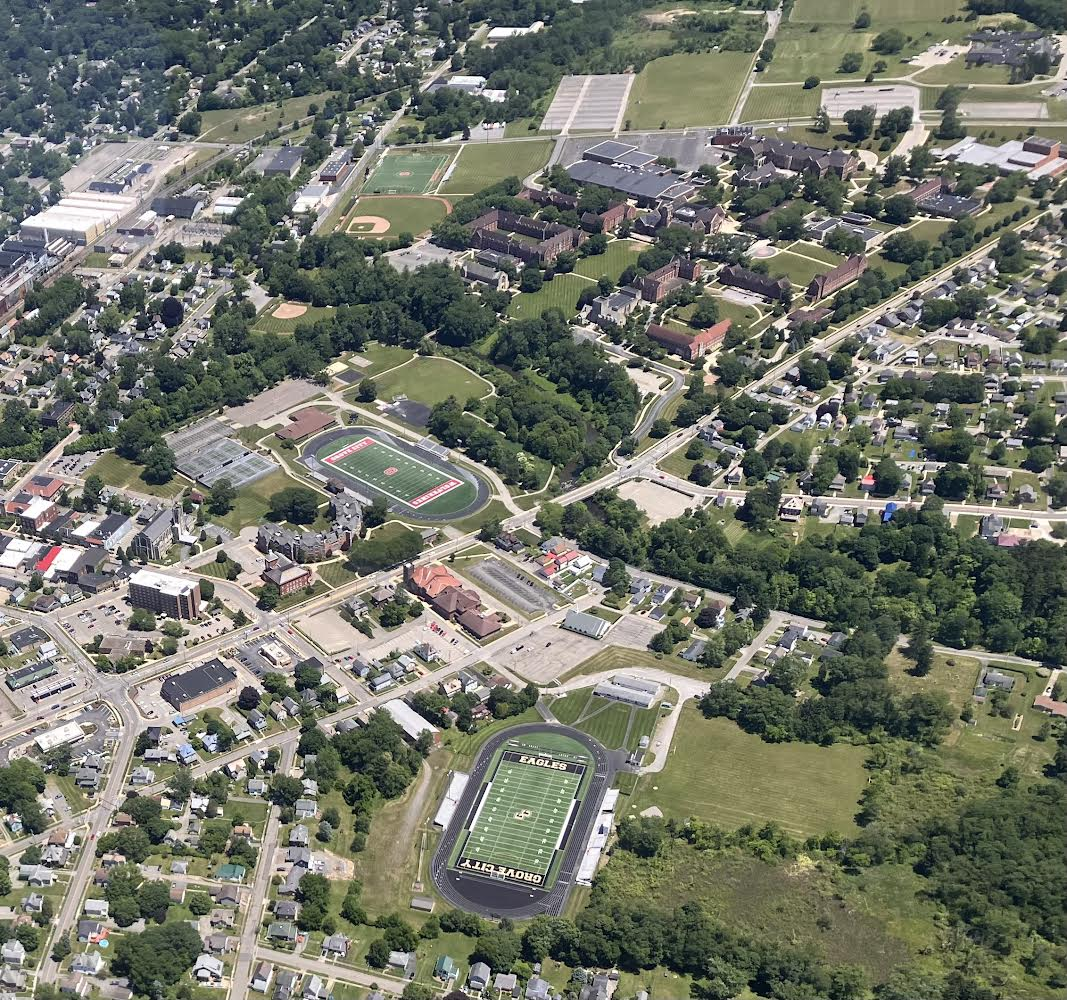
Aerial photograph of the campus in 2024

== Groups and organizations ==
GCC hosts approximately 150 Student Organizations and Activities.

=== Publications and media ===
The Grove City College Journal of Law & Public Policy was founded in 2009 and features writing about political theory, jurisprudence, and Austrian economics. Grove City College is one of five undergraduate institutions to publish a law journal.

Other periodicals are The Bridge (the college yearbook), The Collegian (the campus newspaper), Cogitare (associated with ISI), and The Quad (a literary magazine).

=== WSAJ radio ===
The 1,600-watt FM signal covers a 30 mi radius in Western Pennsylvania. The station broadcasts fine arts programming, college football and basketball games. It also airs community events and high school sports. Students host shows during the evening hours when school is in session.

=== Fraternities, sororities, and housing groups ===
Members of fraternities and sororities live on campus in pre-selected upperclassman halls. Grove City's fraternities and sororities are local and are not affiliated with any of the national "Greek umbrella organizations".

== Athletics ==
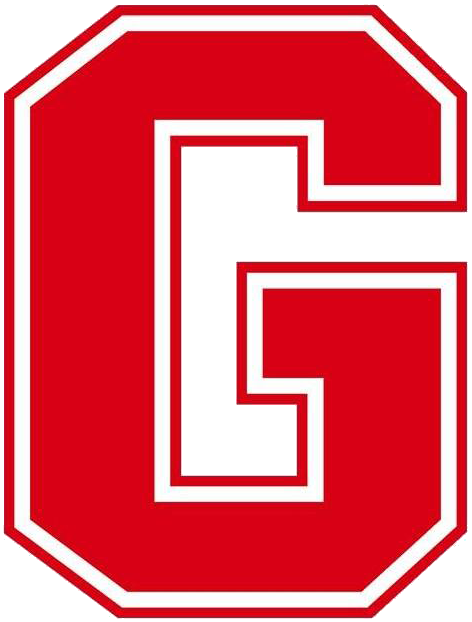
Grove City athletics logo

Grove City has been fielding athletics teams for over a century. In 1906, they were one of the 39 charter members of the IAAUS, the forerunner of the NCAA.

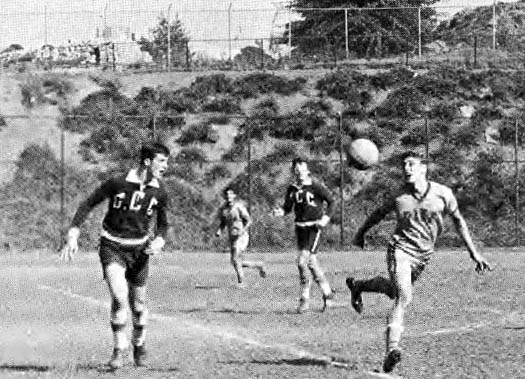
Grove City (dark shirts) v Pittsburgh, soccer match in 1965

Grove City College, known athletically as the Wolverines, competes in the Presidents' Athletic Conference (PAC) of NCAA Division III. On the varsity level, Grove City College has basketball, cross country, golf, soccer, cheerleading, swimming, tennis, and track teams for both men and women. Lacrosse, baseball, rugby union and football are varsity sports available to men only, while softball and water polo are varsity sports offered to women only.

Grove City also offers several club sports to men and women including but not limited to ultimate, volleyball for men and field hockey, lacrosse, and rugby for women. These teams have been very successful, most notably the men's club volleyball team, which has finished in the top 10 in the country each of the last two years, the men's lacrosse team, which finished in the top 10 in the country in 2015, and both the men's and women's rugby teams which have been ranked in the top 10 in the country by the National Small College Rugby Organization. Men's volleyball will be elevated to full varsity status in 2024–25.

Intramural sports for men are as follows: basketball, bowling, dodgeball, football, soccer, softball, table tennis, tennis, ultimate, and volleyball. Women have badminton, basketball, bowling, flag football, indoor soccer, kickball, racquetball, ultimate, and volleyball.

In 2018, the school's assistant sports information director was charged with nearly 100 counts for crimes ranging from privacy violations to possession of child pornography after it was discovered he had been secretly recording students who were showering in the college's locker room.

== People ==
=== Notable alumni ===
- David M. Bailey – guitarist, singer-songwriter
- Jc Beall – philosopher
- Peter Boettke – professor of economics
- Edward D. Breen – corporate CEO
- Alejandro Chafuen – author, president and former CEO of Atlas Network
- Larry Critchfield – former NFL player
- Arthur Schwab – U.S. federal district court judge and GCC adjunct professor
- Jim Van Eerden – entrepreneur, brand strategist, media producer, and co-founder of Helixx Partners, LLC
- George Clark Southworth – engineer and physicist
- R.J. Bowers – football player
- Scott Bullock – attorney and founding member of Institute For Justice
- Bill Deasy – singer-songwriter, novelist
- Burdette "Bob" Glenn – baseball player and engineer
- Scott Hahn – theologian
- Matt Kibbe – former president and CEO of FreedomWorks
- Mose Lantz – football player
- Brian Leftow – philosopher
- Paul McNulty – former U.S. Deputy Attorney General and former president of Grove City College
- Gary Peters – baseball player
- J. Howard Pew – founder and former president of Sun Oil Company
- David J. Porter – judge on the United States Court of Appeals for the Third Circuit
- Nicholas Ranjan, District Judge, United States District Court for the Western District of Pennsylvania
- Lawrence Reed, president of the Foundation for Economic Education (FEE)
- Sean Rowe – 28th presiding bishop of the U.S.-based Episcopal Church
- Tiffany Seitz – Miss Pennsylvania 2020
- Spike Shannon – baseball player
- Frank Smith – baseball player
- Frank Soday – chemist
- Greg Urbas – wrestling coach
- Harold Willis Dodds – president of Princeton University
- Howard Edward Winklevoss, Jr. – academic and entrepreneur

=== Notable professors ===
- G.K. Beale – theologian
- T. David Gordon – theologian
- Guillermo Gonzalez – astrophysicist
- Richard G. Jewell – former president of Grove City College and former Pittsburgh director of Navigant Consulting Inc.
- Paul Kengor – author, executive director of Grove City College's Center for Vision and Values
- Paul McNulty – former president of Grove City College and former Deputy Attorney General of the United States
- Mike Pence - former vice president of the United States
- Hans Sennholz – economist
- Warren Throckmorton – professor of psychology
- Carl Trueman – theologian and historian
- Walter E. Williams – professor of economics
- Angelo Codevilla – political scientist
- James C. Conwell – mechanical engineer, president of Rose-Hulman Institute of Technology

=== Past presidents ===
- Isaac Conrad Ketler (1876–1913)
- Alexander T. Ormond (1913–1915)
- Weir Carlyle Ketler (1916–1956)
- John Stanley Harker (1956–1971)
- Charles Sherrard Mackenzie (1971–1991)
- Jerry H. Combee (1991–1995)
- John H. Moore (1996–2003)
- Richard G. Jewell J.D. (2004–2014)
- Paul McNulty (2014–2025)
- Bradley J. Lingo J.D. (2025-present)
