= Jordan Alexandra =

English actress

- Born: London, England
- Education: Identity School of Acting
- Occupation: Actress
- Years active: 2018–present
- Website: iamjordanalexandra.com

Jordan Alexandra is an English actress.

== Biography ==
Alexandra is of Jamaican and Barbadian descent on her mother's side, and spent most of her childhood summers in Barbados. When she was 11 years old, she and her family moved to Brazil for two years. She attended Identity School of Acting in London.

== Filmography ==
=== Film ===
Year	Title	Role	Ref.
2021	Boiling Point	Bryony	
2022	Doctor Strange in the Multiverse of Madness	Office Worker	
2022	A Tree Fell Today	Jessica	
2023	Black Bits	Dora	
2023	Surprised by Oxford	Linnea	
2023	The Shift	Priya Nadir	

=== Television ===
Year	Title	Role	Notes	Ref.
2020	Brave New World	Beta Woman	1 episode	
2020	Bridgerton	Courtesan 1	1 episode	
2021	Grantchester	Sunny West	1 episode	
2022	Mammals	Gaby	1 episode	
2023	The Winter King	Guinevere	5 episodes	
2024	3 Body Problem	Siobhan	1 episode	
2025	Hotel Costiera	Genny	6 episodes	
