= Small Town Conspiracy =

- Directed by: Ralph Clemente
- Written by: Stephen Bowles; Peter A. Zorn Jr.
- Release date: 2003
- Country: United States
- Language: English

Small Town Conspiracy or formally known as Florida City is an independent feature film shot in 2003 in Orlando, Florida. The movie is based on a true story that took place in 1941 in a small city outside of Miami. The film stars Zen Gesner as Chief of Police John Haleran who is conducting a murder investigation.

The movie was shot in Center Hill, Florida and Winter Garden, Florida (towns near Orlando, Florida) and was directed by Ralph Clemente. Clemente was a very well known person in the filming industry as director/producer and also known for being the Program Director at the Valencia Community College Film Production Technology Program at Orlando, Florida, "one of the best film schools in the country" as stated by Steven Spielberg.

== Cast ==
- Zen Gesner as John Haleran
- Jeannetta Arnette as Donna Jo
- William Morgan Sheppard as Taylor
- James Bates, Jr. as Andy Creed
- Patrick Cherry as Tector
- Brett Rice as Doc DeLibo
- Talia Osteen as Sarah
- Patrick Holland as James Wilson
- Tom Schuster as One-eyed Man
- George Steele as Tortuga Jack
