= Ali Hillis =

American actress (born 1978)

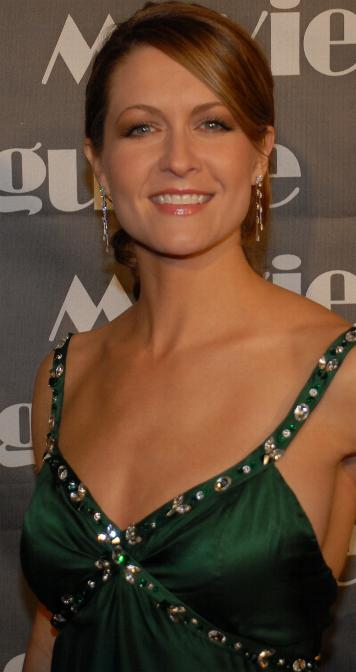
- Hillis at the 16th Annual MovieGuide Faith and Values Awards Gala on February 12, 2008
- Born: December 29, 1978 (age 47); Huntington Beach, California, U.S.
- Education: East Carolina University
- Occupation: Actress
- Years active: 1999–present
- Spouse: Matt Swartz
- Children: 1
- Website: alihillis.com

Ali Hillis (born December 29, 1978) is an American actress who has appeared in television and film, and voices a number of characters in video games. She is best known for her video game work as Dr. Liara T'Soni in the Mass Effect trilogy, Lightning in the Final Fantasy XIII series, and Palutena in Kid Icarus: Uprising.

== Biography ==
Hillis was born in Huntington Beach, California on December 29, 1978. When she was six months old, Hillis and her family moved to Normal, Illinois, and at age 3, to Sheboygan Falls, Wisconsin. She moved to Charlotte, North Carolina, at age 13 and performed at The Children's Theater. She auditioned for Broadway plays in New York City with TV shows of Felicity (2 episodes in 1999), FreakyLinks, Undressed (2000), Naruto, JAG, Boomtown and Less Than Perfect. Her several film roles are All the Wrong Places, Kiss Kiss Bang Bang, Must Love Dogs, Open Water 2: Adrift, The Ultimate Gift, and The Heartbreak Kid and the Los Angeles play, A Good Soldier. Her video game roles are Lightning in Final Fantasy XIII, its sequels and Dissidia 012 Final Fantasy, Liara T'Soni in the Mass Effect trilogy, Ariel Hanson in StarCraft II: Wings of Liberty, Karin in the Naruto series, Palutena in Kid Icarus: Uprising and Isabelle "Izzy" Sinclair in Fuse.

In 2012, she starred in a YouTube web series called Fix Me by ModernMom, in which she plays Sydney Lang, a housewife who tries to fix everything around her.

== Personal life ==
Hillis is married to Matt Swartz. The couple have one daughter together.

== Filmography ==
=== Voice-over roles ===
==== Television ====
List of voice performances in television
| Year | Title | Role | Notes | Source |
|---|---|---|---|---|
| 2005 | Family Guy Presents Stewie Griffin: The Untold Story | Meg singing | | Resume |
| 2011–12 | Marvel Anime: X-Men | Emma Frost | English version | Resume |
| 2013; 2016–19 | Naruto Shippuden | Karin | English version | Resume |
| 2013 | Stitch! | Toriko | English version | |
| 2013; 2015–16 | Regular Show | Tracey, Pam, others | | |
| 2015 | Bear in Underwear | Eloise | | |
| 2019 | Apple & Onion | Cinnamon Twist | | |
| 2019 | Boruto: Naruto Next Generations | Karin | English version | |
| 2022 | Exception | Nina | English version | |

==== Film ====
List of voice performances in direct-to-video and television films
| Year | Title | Role | Source |
|---|---|---|---|
| 2012 | Back to the Sea | Teaching Fish | |
| 2015 | Regular Show: The Movie | Ship Computer, Barbara | |

==== Video games ====
List of performances in video games
| Year | Title | Role | Source |
|---|---|---|---|
| 2005 | Xenosaga Episode II: Jenseits von Gut und Böse | Mary Godwin, Shelley Godwin | |
| 2006 | Xenosaga Episode III: Also sprach Zarathustra | Mary Godwin, Shelley Godwin | |
| 2007 | Mass Effect | Liara T'Soni | |
| 2010–11 | Mass Effect 2 | Liara T'Soni | Resume |
| 2010 | Final Fantasy XIII | Lightning | |
| 2010 | Dead or Alive Paradise | Rio | |
| 2010 | StarCraft II: Wings of Liberty | Ariel Hanson | |
| 2010 | Valkyria Chronicles II | Audrey Gassenarl | |
| 2010–present | Naruto: Ultimate Ninja series | Karin | |
| 2011 | Dissidia 012 Final Fantasy | Lightning | |
| 2011 | Resistance 3 | Glenda, Norma | |
| 2011 | Saints Row: The Third | Pedestrian voices | |
| 2012 | Final Fantasy XIII-2 | Lightning | |
| 2012 | Resident Evil: Revelations | Jessica Sherawat | |
| 2012–13 | Mass Effect 3 | Liara T'Soni | |
| 2012 | Ninja Gaiden 3 | Mizuki McCloud | |
| 2012 | Kid Icarus: Uprising | Palutena | |
| 2012 | The Amazing Spider-Man | Felicia Hardy / Black Cat | |
| 2013 | Gears of War: Judgment | Sofia Hendrik | |
| 2013 | Fuse | Isabelle Sinclair, Female Computer | |
| 2013 | Saints Row IV | The Voices of Virtual Steelport | |
| 2013 | Ratchet & Clank: Into the Nexus | Talwyn, Computer, Mrs. Zurkon | |
| 2014 | Lightning Returns: Final Fantasy XIII | Lightning | |
| 2014 | The Amazing Spider-Man 2 | Black Cat/Felicia Hardy | |
| 2014 | Dragon Age: Inquisition | Lace Harding, Valta | |
| 2015 | Final Fantasy Type-0 HD | Emina | |
| 2016 | Ratchet & Clank | Computer, Starlene, Mrs. Zurkon | |
| 2016 | World of Final Fantasy | Lightning | |
| 2017 | Mass Effect: Andromeda | Liara T'Soni | |
| 2017 | Mobius Final Fantasy | Lightning | |
| 2018 | Dissidia Final Fantasy NT | Lightning | |
| 2021 | Mass Effect Legendary Edition | Liara T'Soni | |
| 2021 | Shin Megami Tensei III: Nocturne HD Remaster | Old Woman, Lady of the Fount | |
| 2021 | Ratchet & Clank: Rift Apart | Mrs Zurkon, Ms. Fungal | |
| 2023 | Star Trek: Resurgence | Bedrosian | |
| 2024 | Arknights | Ascalon | |
| 2024 | Batman: Arkham Shadow | Vicki Vale, Officer O'Hara | |
| 2024 | Dragon Age: The Veilguard | Lace Harding | |
| 2024 | Stranger Things VR | Eleven | |
| 2025 | Date Everything! | Maggie | |

=== Live-action roles ===
==== Television ====
List of live-action acting performances on television and related media
| Year | Title | Role | Notes | Source |
|---|---|---|---|---|
| 1999 | Felicity | Chloe | 2 episodes | Resume |
| 2000 | Undressed | Kim | 3 episodes | Resume |
| 2000 | MK3 | | FOX pilot | Resume |
| 2000 | FreakyLinks | Crystal | Episode: "Subject: Fearsum" | Resume |
| 2001 | Baywatch Hawaii | Ivy Latham | Episode: "A Good Man in a Storm" | Resume |
| 2001 | Inside Schwartz | Laine | Episode: "Roommates" | Resume |
| 2002 | Boomtown | Melanie Stone | Episode: "The Squeeze" | Resume |
| 2002 | Less than Perfect | Tiffany | Episode: "The Pole" | Resume |
| 2004 | Jessica | Holly | TV pilot with Jessica Simpson | |
| 2004 | JAG | Rachel Hanna | Episode: "Retrial" | Resume |
| 2005 | Life on a Stick | Jenny | Episode: "Things People Stand For" | Resume |
| 2007 | Heartland | Heather Hartog | Episode: "I Make Myself Into Something New" | Resume |
| 2007 | My Boys | Rachel | Episode: "The Estates of Hoffman" | Resume |
| 2008 | The New Adventures of Old Christine | Denise | Episode: "Beauty is Only Spanx Deep" | Resume |
| 2010 | Miami Medical | Heidi Pelton | Episode: "88 Seconds" | Resume |
| 2011 | CSI: Crime Scene Investigation | Olivia Fowler | Episode: "Hitting for the Cycle" | Resume |
| 2011 | Memphis Beat | Stacy Ekler | Episode: "At the River" | Resume |
| 2012 | Fix Me | Sydney Lang | Web series for ModernMom.com | Facebook |
| 2015 | Castle | Megan Brooks | Episode: "At Close Range" | Resume |
| 2015 | Bones | Lynette O'Malley | Episode: "The Senator in the Street Sweeper" | Resume |
| 2017 | Rebel | Vivian Reeves | Episode: "Partners" | Resume |
| 2017 | NCIS: Los Angeles | VA Administrator | Episode: "Battle Scars" | |
| 2018 | NCIS | Antonia Morello | Episode: "Fallout" | |
| 2018 | 9-1-1 | Jen | 2 episodes | |
| 2019 | Grey's Anatomy | Lori Carter | 4 episodes | |
| 2022-2023 | Chicago Med | Vickie Evans | 2 episodes | |
| 2026 | Crystal Lake | Maxine | Episode: "Friday..." | |

==== Film ====
List of live-action acting performances in feature films
| Year | Title | Role | Source |
|---|---|---|---|
| 2000 | All the Wrong Places | Marisa Baron | Resume |
| 2002 | The Month of August | August | Resume |
| 2005 | Kiss Kiss Bang Bang | Marleah | |
| 2005 | Must Love Dogs | Christine | Resume |
| 2005 | American Gun | Gunshop Patron | Resume |
| 2006 | Open Water 2: Adrift | Lauren | Resume |
| 2006 | The Ultimate Gift | Alexia Drummond | Resume |
| 2007 | The Heartbreak Kid | Jodi the Bride | Resume |
| 2008 | Beverly Hills Chihuahua | Angela | YouTube |
| 2013 | The Ultimate Life | Alexia Drummond | Resume |
| 2014 | The Road Within | Monica | Resume |
| 2015 | The Ultimate Legacy | Alexia Drummond | Resume |

List of live-action acting performances in direct-to-video and television films
| Year | Title | Role | Source |
|---|---|---|---|
| 2009 | Space Buddies | Astro Spalding | |
| 2012 | Santa Paws 2: The Santa Pups | Agnes Bright | Resume |
