= Caleb Castille =

American actor

- Born: 1991 (age 34–35); Columbus, Georgia
- Education: Briarwood Christian School
- Occupation: Actor
- Years active: 2015–present

Caleb Castille (born 1991) is an American actor.

== Early life and education ==
Castille was born in Columbus, Georgia, and graduated from Briarwood Christian School in Birmingham, Alabama.

== Career ==
Castille made his film debut by portraying Tony Nathan in the 2015 film Woodlawn. He also played Jordan in the 2019 film The World We Make. On television, he played Devin Rountree in NCIS: Los Angeles. He also appeared in the Hulu series Wu-Tang: An American Saga and the CBS All Access series Tell Me a Story. He appeared in one episode of the ABC series The Rookie.

== Personal life ==
He is the brother of Tim Castille and Simeon Castille. His father is Jeremiah Castille.

== Filmography ==
=== Film ===
Year	Title	Role	Notes
2015	Woodlawn	Tony Nathan	
2018	Run the Race	Dexter	
2019	The World We Make	Jordan Bishop	
2019	Bad Dream	News Director	Short film

=== Television ===
Year	Title	Role	Notes
2018	9-1-1	Chad	1 episode
2019	The Rookie	Dylan Scott	1 episode
2019–2020	Tell Me a Story	Ron Garland	7 episodes
2017–2022	In the Vault	Evin Watson	16 episodes
2019–2023	Wu-Tang: An American Saga	Cappadonna	5 episodes
2020–2023	NCIS: Los Angeles	Devin Rountree	64 episodes
