= The Ultimate Life =

2013 American romance-drama film

- Directed by: Michael Landon Jr.
- Screenplay by: Brian Bird; Lisa G. Shillingburg
- Produced by: David R. Kappes; Rick Eldridge
- Starring: Logan Bartholomew; Ali Hillis; Lee Meriwether; Bill Cobbs
- Cinematography: Christo Bakalov
- Edited by: Bridget Durnford
- Music by: Mark McKenzie
- Distributed by: High Top Releasing
- Release date: September 6, 2013
- Running time: 105 minutes
- Country: United States
- Language: English

The Ultimate Life is a 2013 drama film directed by Michael Landon Jr. and is the sequel to The Ultimate Gift. It is from a screenplay written by Brian Bird and Lisa G. Shillingburg, which is in turn based on the best selling novel by Jim Stovall. It stars Logan Bartholomew, Peter Fonda, and Ali Hillis, and was released on September 6, 2013 in the United States. A sequel The Ultimate Legacy was released in 2017.

== Plot ==
Three years after the events of The Ultimate Gift, Jason Stevens (Logan Bartholomew) is running the Stevens Foundation after inheriting the trust of his grandfather, Red Stevens. Planning to propose to Alexia (Ali Hillis), Jason is interrupted by a notice of a lawsuit by his aunts and uncles members vying for control of the foundation (and thus the inheritance left by Red). So focused on fighting the lawsuit and the continued pursuit of his wealth, Jason does not have time to listen to Alexia's announcement that she has decided to become a disaster nurse in Haiti for six months. Alexia leaves a note with Jason who reads the news of Alexia's departure with shock. Going to his grandfather's friend and lawyer, Mr. Hamilton (Bill Cobbs) for advice, Mr. Hamilton reveals that his grandfather had written a personal journal that he encourages Jason to read for advice.

The rest of the film is a frame story covering the life of Red Stevens and his pursuit of his wealth.

== Cast ==
- Drew Waters as Red Stevens
  - Austin James as Young Red Stevens
- Jack Depew as Gus Caldwell
- Abigail Mavity as Hanna Stevens
  - Elizabeth Ann Bennett as Adult Hanna
- Bill Cobbs as Theophilus Hamilton
  - Bechir Smith as Young Theophilus
- Peter Fonda as Jacob Early
- Ali Hillis as Alexia Drummond
- Logan Bartholomew as Jason Stevens
- Lee Meriwether as Miss Margaret Hastings
- David Mann as Hobo Joe
- Brett Rice as Bill Stevens
- Mark Withers as Strang

== Release ==
The film was released to 412 theaters and was expected to gross around $1 million, similar to other films for Christian audiences. It performed below expectations, grossing $659,912 in its opening weekend. It grossed a total of $1,327,841 in North America.

== Reception ==
On the review aggregator website Rotten Tomatoes, 20% of 10 critics' reviews are positive, with an average rating of 3.8/10. Metacritic, which uses a weighted average, assigned the film a score of 19 out of 100, based on seven critics, indicating "overwhelming dislike".

Daniel M. Gold of The New York Times was critical of the film saying it was "hampered by a predictable story, stereotypical characters and wooden acting."
