= Surprised by Oxford =

- Directed by: Ryan Whitaker
- Written by: Ryan Whitaker; Carolyn Weber
- Produced by: Ken Carpenter; Jen Lewis
- Starring: Rose Reid; Ruairi O'Connor
- Cinematography: Edd Lukas
- Edited by: Zach Prichard
- Music by: Nick Box
- Production companies: Evolve Studios; Nook Lane Entertainment; Ascendant Fox; Distinction Films; Quite Quick Productions
- Release date: October 8, 2022 (Heartland)
- Running time: 107 minutes
- Countries: United States; United Kingdom
- Language: English
- Box office: $24,691

Surprised by Oxford is a 2022 British-American Christian romantic drama film written by Ryan Whitaker and Carolyn Weber, directed by Whitaker and starring Rose Reid and Ruairi O'Connor.

== Plot ==
The movie is based on a book by Carolyn Weber and describes her experiences in Oxford University in the early 1990's.

The film begins with young Caro’s world turning upside down when she learns that her father has been living a double life. After he is arrested, Caro’s mother must work to raise her alone.

Caro develops a fierce independence and a skeptical view of faith and religion. She’s determined to focus on her academic career and is portrayed as someone who places intellectual pursuits above personal or spiritual ones.

Caro receives an undergraduate scholarship and then a scholarship to Oxford University for her DPhil. As she settles into her new environment, she meets Kent Weber, a sensitive, charming fellow student who is committed to his faith.

Their first interaction is brief, but Kent immediately stands out due to his openness about his beliefs, something Caro finds intriguing. However, she remains skeptical of religion and dismisses it as irrelevant to her life.

In her classes and social settings, Caro encounters a diverse group of professors and students who debate faith, reason, and the meaning of life. The discussions cause her to question her convictions.

As time passes, Caro and Kent’s friendship deepens. They share conversations about faith, literature, and life. Caro is increasingly drawn to Kent’s open-hearted approach to life. Despite their differences, their bond grows, and Caro finds herself wrestling with thoughts of faith, especially as Kent’s kindness and patience cause her to reexamine what she considers most important in life.

Caro is warned that her grades are falling and she is in danger of losing her scholarship. She determines to concentrate solely on her studies. She ends all social contact with Kent.

Caro’s social isolation leaves her depressed and lonely, but she remains committed to devoting all her time to her studies. When she observes Kent dating another student, she becomes emotionally distraught.

While studying in the library, Caro violates the policy against using an inkpen. When the librarian scolds her for doing so, she breaks the pen, spilling ink on a library book. As a result, Caro is banned from using the library.

The Provost, Regina Knight, kindly invites Caro to be her guest for the weekend. She describes her own experiences in life, citing C.S.Lewis as an example of an academic skeptic who eventually found faith. She encourages Caro to reconsider her priorities, including rekindling her friendship with Kent.

Upon her return to Oxford, Caro and Kent rekindle their feelings for each other. But Kent has bittersweet news: After he completed his studies, he accepted employment in Washington, DC, and must leave that same evening. As he leaves for the airport, Caro chases his taxi, but it does not stop, and she returns home soaked from the rain.

The final scene fast-forwards 2 years. Caro has grown in her faith, completed her studies, and now teaches at Oxford, helping students find the same balance of faith and intellectualism that she sought. She receives a note in the mail from Kent. After reading it, she goes outside and wends her way through a crowd until she sees Kent. They embrace. The end credits explain that they married and Caro continued to have both a successful career and a strong faith.

== Cast ==
- Rose Reid as Caro Drake
  - Anabelle Holloway as young Caro
- Ruairi O'Connor as Kent Webber
- Phyllis Logan as Provost Regina Knight
- Mark Williams as Professor Nuttham
- Michael Culkin as Professor McTeague
- Simon Callow as Dr Sterling
- Lourdes Faberes as Professor Rutlege
- Jordan Alexandra as Linnea
- Emma Naomi as Hannah
- Ed Stoppard as Dr Condorston
- Louis Landau as Edward
- Johnny Fairclough as Michael
- George Jaques as Bill
- Olisa Odele as Fred
- Professor David Maw as himself

== Production ==
Filming began in the University of Oxford in October 2021.

== Release ==
The film premiered at the Heartland International Film Festival on October 8, 2022. Then it was released in theaters on September 27, 2023. Surprised by Oxford was released on digital platforms on December 1, 2023.

== Reception ==
The film has a 70% rating on Rotten Tomatoes based on ten reviews. Nell Minow of RogerEbert.com awarded the film three stars. Bradley Gibson of Film Threat rated the film an 8 out of 10. Cath Clarke of The Guardian awarded the film two stars out of five.

== See also ==
- My Oxford Year
