= Joe Craddock =

American football player and coach (born 1985)

Current position
- Title: Quarterbacks coach
- Team: Florida
- Conference: SEC

Biographical details
- Born: September 7, 1985 (age 41); Chelsea, Alabama, U.S.

Playing career
- 2005–2008: Middle Tennessee State
- 2009–2010: Parma Panthers
- Position: Quarterback

Coaching career (HC unless noted)
- 2010–2011: Briarwood Christian HS (AL) (OC/QB)
- 2012: Clemson (player dev.)
- 2013–2014: Clemson (GA)
- 2015–2017: SMU (OC/QB)
- 2018–2019: Arkansas (OC/QB)
- 2020–2021: UAB (TE)
- 2022–2023: Troy (OC/QB)
- 2024–2025: Tulane (OC/QB)
- 2026–present: Florida (QB)

Joe Craddock (born September 7, 1985) is an American college football coach and former player. He is the quarterbacks coach at the University of Florida. Craddock played college football at Middle Tennessee State University and professionally in the Italian Football League (IFL).

He has served as the offensive coordinator as Southern Methodist University (SMU) from 2015 to 2017 and the University of Arkansas from 2018 to 2019 under head coach Chad Morris.

== Playing career ==
Craddock attended Briarwood Christian School and started at quarterback from 2001 to 2003. In 2003, Craddock led Briarwood Christian to a state championship victory in their 5A classification. He was named MVP of that game. After his prep career, he accepted a scholarship to play football at Middle Tennessee State University in Murfreesboro, Tennessee.

Craddock attended Middle Tennessee from 2004 to 2008, starting for the Blue Raiders during his junior and senior seasons. In his final campaign in 2008, he was named a team captain. During this season he led the Blue Raiders to a 24–14 upset win over the Maryland Terrapins. Craddock was also a member of the school's baseball team for one season.

After his collegiate career concluded, Craddock spent two seasons as the starting quarterback for the Parma Panthers of the Italian Football League (IFL). He led them to the 2010 IFL Super Bowl, a game in which he threw seven touchdowns.

== Coaching career ==
Prior to his collegiate coaching career, Craddock was hired on at his prep school alma mater as a high school offensive coordinator at Briarwood Christian School in Birmingham, Alabama by coach Fred Yancey, where he also worked as a maintenance worker for the school. During his tenure at Briarwood Christian, the school compiled a 25–4 record and finished as the state runner-up in 2010. After the 2011 season, he was hired as an offensive player development coach by Dabo Swinney at Clemson University. Upon the conclusion of the 2012 football season, he was given on-field graduate assistant duties working with the quarterbacks, a role he held until December 2014.

In December 2014, Chad Morris named Craddock as his offensive coordinator and quarterbacks coach. At the time of the hiring, Craddock was 29 years old and the youngest offensive coordinator in college football.

In December 2017, Craddock was brought on with Morris to be the new offensive coordinator at the University of Arkansas. Craddock was a Broyles Award nominee in 2017. Craddock was the youngest offensive coordinator in the Southeastern Conference (SEC).

In January 2020, Craddock was announced as the tight ends coach for UAB. In December 2021, Craddock was named offensive coordinator for Troy.

Craddock began serving as offensive coordinator for Tulane in 2024.

== Personal life ==
Craddock married sweetheart, Abby Richburg, on February 7, 2015, and the couple welcomed their first child, Charlie Kathryn, in November 2016 and added a son, Joe "Cain" in November 2018.
