= The Shift (2023 film) =

Film by Brock Heasley

- Theatrical release poster
- Directed by: Brock Heasley
- Written by: Brock Heasley
- Produced by: Ken Carpenter; Brock Heasley
- Starring: Kristoffer Polaha; Neal McDonough; Elizabeth Tabish; Rose Reid; John Billingsley; Paras Patel; Jordan Alexandra; Sean Astin
- Cinematography: Edd Lukas
- Edited by: Chris Witt
- Music by: Dan Haseltine; Matthew S. Nelson
- Production companies: Nook Lane Entertainment; Pinnacle Peak Pictures; Saltshaker Films
- Distributed by: Angel Studios
- Release dates: November 3, 2023 (168 Film Festival); December 1, 2023 (United States)
- Running time: 115 minutes
- Country: United States
- Language: English
- Budget: $6.4 million
- Box office: $12.2 million

The Shift is a 2023 American Christian science fiction thriller film written and directed by Brock Heasley and starring Kristoffer Polaha, Neal McDonough, Elizabeth Tabish, Rose Reid, John Billingsley, Paras Patel, Jordan Alexandra and Sean Astin. It is a loose adaptation of the Book of Job.

The film was released in theaters on December 1, 2023, to negative reviews from critics.

== Plot ==
In 2008, hedge fund manager and recovering alcoholic Kevin Garner loses his job after the collapse of Bear Stearns. Despondent and tempted to drink again, he goes to a bar but is interrupted by Molly, who approaches him on a dare from her friends. They hit it off, Kevin decides to stay sober, and they eventually marry.

Years later, the couple is estranged after the disappearance of their son. Molly has become an embittered alcoholic, and Kevin is miserable at a job where his younger boss despises him. After learning he will be fired, Kevin drives home distraught and crashes his car. A mysterious stranger—The Benefactor—pulls him from the wreck, claiming he has crossed into another reality. The Benefactor brings Kevin to a café, where the staff and patrons react with visible fear. After a tense exchange, Kevin realizes the Benefactor is actually Satan.

The Benefactor reveals that an infinite number of alternate universes exist, each created by people's choices, and that he routinely “shifts” people between them as a means of sowing discord. All other versions of Kevin already work for him as “shifters”—souls who help transfer people to other realities, swapping them with their doppelgängers. Even Molly has already been “shifted” twice, without anyone noticing. When a skeptical Kevin demands proof, the Benefactor demonstrates by shifting a waitress named Tina into a universe where she was never born, warning that such drastic shifts cause severe psychological trauma. Horrified, Kevin begins to pray under his breath. The Benefactor, enraged by the prayer, declares he will never leave Kevin alone and vanishes, stranding Kevin in the alternate world.

Five years later, Kevin still lives in this reality, using an alias to conceal his identity as the "Kevin Who Refused." In this universe, the world lies in ruins after endless wars. The Benefactor's totalitarian regime rules the remaining population through fear and oppression, and the shifters work as powerful agents, using small wrist devices called deviators to exile anyone deemed “problematic.” Kevin spends his days secretly typing and distributing Biblical passages from memory—since Scripture is outlawed—with help from his closest friend, Gabriel. He also shares stories like that of Job with his neighbor Rajit and his family. Kevin occasionally finds solace at a cinema owned by Russo, which plays live footage of doppelgängers in alternate realities.

While watching one day, Kevin sees several versions of Molly. One is a nurse and single mother; another wears a necklace he once gifted his wife, which only the “original” Molly owned. Realizing she may still exist somewhere, Kevin decides to find a deviator and return to that version of her. When he learns the Benefactor will soon visit this reality for the first time in years, Kevin plans to confront him. Gabriel provides Kevin with an illegal firearm, but during a nearby police raid, chaos erupts. Rajit is wounded and Gabriel is knocked unconscious—and Kevin notices a deviator on Gabriel's wrist, revealing his friend has secretly been a shifter all along.

Kevin uses the deviator to shift through multiple universes, briefly encountering an unhinged Tina in a psychiatric ward, before returning to his apartment in the dystopian reality. Determined, Kevin rushes to Russo's cinema, and together they use the theater's signal system to locate the version of Molly wearing the necklace. Kevin shifts to that universe and reunites with Molly, but she rebuffs him, telling him she has moved on. Despite the emotional distance, Kevin feels hope that they could heal their relationship. Suddenly, the Benefactor reappears and yanks Kevin back to the totalitarian world, taunting him for clinging to faith despite his immense suffering. He offers Kevin a choice: join him as a shifter in exchange for a life with Molly or restore Tina to her original family, never to see Molly again. Kevin chooses compassion, freeing Tina instead of saving himself.

Immediately afterward, Kevin shifts again, this time to the universe where Molly is the nurse and single mother he saw before. This version of Molly does not recognize him, but when they meet, their interaction mirrors their first encounter years ago at the bar. Kevin and Molly fall in love once more and marry, forming a new family with Molly's daughter and their newborn son. Through voiceover, Kevin acknowledges this is not his original universe but calls it his home, suggesting that grace and redemption transcend reality itself.

== Cast ==
- Kristoffer Polaha as Kevin Garner
- Neal McDonough as the Benefactor
- Elizabeth Tabish as Molly Garner
- Sean Astin as Gabriel
- Rose Reid as Tina
- John Billingsley as Russo
- Paras Patel as Rajit Nadir
- Jordan Alexandra as Priya Nadir
- Jordan Walker Ross as Brendan
- Jason Marsden as Cyrus
- Emily Rose as Tabatha
- Nolan North as Brett

== Production ==
Principal photography began on January 30, 2023, in Birmingham, Alabama, and shot for six weeks. The original plan was to shoot the film in Atlanta, Georgia.

== Release ==
The Shift had an early screening at the 168 Film Festival in Fayetteville, Georgia on November 3, 2023. The film was originally scheduled to be released in theatres in January 2024, but was moved up to December 1, 2023.

== Reception ==
=== Box office ===
The Shift grossed $12.1 million in United States and Canada and $120,424 in other territories, for a worldwide total of $12.2 million.

The film made $4.4 million from 2,450 theatres in its opening weekend, finishing in eighth place, behind Animal.

=== Critical response ===
On the review aggregator website Rotten Tomatoes, 34% of 32 critics' reviews are positive, with an average rating of 5.1/10. The website's consensus reads: "The Shift's solid cast and intriguing premise are steadily squandered by its jumbled story's unsuccessful attempt to put a sci-fi spin on the Book of Job." Audiences surveyed by CinemaScore gave the film an average grade of "B+" on an A+ to F scale, while those polled by PostTrak gave it an 85% overall positive score, with 69% saying they would definitely recommend the film.

Frank Scheck, writing from The Hollywood Reporter, argued that The Shift "traffics in the same annoying multiverse complications that have made the Marvel films so laborious". He went on to say: "As the storyline endlessly and confusingly shifts from one reality to another, it's all too easy to tune out until we encounter one that's interesting. Alas, that never happens". The Chicago Reader's Noah Berlatsky was similarly negative, writing: "Brock Heasley's The Shift is a remarkably incoherent farrago of sci-fi tropes and Christian proselytizing... [The] film slogs ahead in a manner that is both nonsensically erratic and completely predictable, with a heavy-handed voiceover inadequately trying to pull the narrative together and create some vague dramatic tension". Variety's Peter Debruge wrote: "For believers looking to spend their bucks on films that reflect their values, The Shift does a serviceable job of offering them another genre to explore... Heasley first made The Shift as a 21-minute short, and there's just enough here to support a feature". However, he concluded: "It all would have worked better if audiences bought the relationship between Kevin and Molly, but the two leads lack chemistry or a compelling meet-cute (the one Heasley provides is almost painful)".

Reviews from faith-based publications were more positive. Christianity Today's Rebecca Cusey called The Shift "an entertaining, thoughtful, and cinematically competent retelling of Job", but added that "like many faith-based films... [it has] a bit too much telling and too little showing".
