= Brett Rice =

American actor (born 1954)

- Born: James Brett Rice; April 20, 1954 (age 71); Chattanooga, Tennessee, U.S.
- Occupation: Actor
- Years active: 1982–present
- Website: brettrice.com

James Brett Rice (born April 20, 1954) is an American film, television, and theater actor. He is perhaps known for his roles in the films Forrest Gump (1994), Remember the Titans (2000), Monster (2003), Super 8 (2011), Foxcatcher (2014), and Sully (2016).

== Early life ==
Brett Rice was born in 1954 in Chattanooga, Tennessee, the oldest of four children. He attended a number of schools until finally he was sent to Marist Military Academy in Atlanta, after which he had a short time in the U.S. Army.

== Acting career ==
He went with a friend to the theater building to wait as he auditioned for a show. While he waited the director asked him if he wanted to audition. He landed a role and from that moment on lived, ate and drank the theater. Over the next five years he went to every theater in Atlanta and auditioned for almost everything that came along. This included a TV pilot for The Catlins (1982) which led to a two-year contract. He got a part in The Bear (1984), with Gary Busey and then a role in a TV movie called Poison Ivy (1985), with Michael J. Fox, Adam Baldwin and Nancy McKeon. Work was hard to find for a while but he worked throughout the 1990s. He played in many TV shows such as In the Heat of the Night (1988), I'll Fly Away (1991), Walker, Texas Ranger (1993), and many more. Theatrical films included Edward Scissorhands (1990), Passenger 57 (1992), Kalifornia (1993), Forrest Gump (1994), From the Earth to the Moon (1998), The Waterboy (1998) and as a co-star in Remember the Titans (2000) in which he played Coach Tyrell opposite Denzel Washington and Will Patton. He had a guest appearance on the television show, Sheena (2000) in the episode "Stranded in the Jungle" (2002). Brett has over 75 credits for TV and film, and at least that many credits for the stage. He has become a Councilor at Large with SAG to get more closely involved with the unusual politics and negotiations with producers in Los Angeles and New York. He starred as Tucker Baggett in the A&E/Netflix series Longmire.

== Filmography ==
=== Film ===
Year	Title	Role	Notes
1984	The Bear	Don Hutson	
1986	Running Mates	John	
1988	Final Cut	Mark	
1990	Edward Scissorhands	Reporter	
1991	Problem Child 2	Maitre D'	
1992	Passenger 57	Cop #1	as James Brett Rice
1993	Kalifornia	Police Officer	
1993	Matinee	Gene's Dad (voice)	
1994	Forrest Gump	High School Football Coach	
1994	Gordy	Jud	as James Brett Rice
1996	Fled	Officer Thornhill	
1997	Rosewood	William Bryce	
1998	Palmetto	Crash Site Cop	
1998	Holy Man	Detective #1	
1998	The Waterboy	Laski	
1998	Making Waves	Mr. Davis	
1999	Selma, Lord, Selma	Sheriff Potts	
1999	All Shook Up	Deputy Lowden	
2000	Small Town Conspiracy	Doc DeLibo	
2000	Remember the Titans	Coach Herb Tyrell	
2000	Unshackled	Captain Tucker	
2002	The President's Man: A Line in the Sand	Stephen Mornay	
2002	Longshot	Older Valet	as James Brett Rice
2002	Sunshine State	Buyer #2	
2003	Small Town Conspiracy	Doc DeLibo	
2003	Dunsmore	Rev. Borland	
2003	Monster	Charles	
2004	Bobby Jones: Stroke of Genius	Big Bob Jones	
2004	The Eliminator	Pilot	
2005	Today You Die	Taggert	
2006	Glory Road	George McCarty	
2006	Last Time Forever	Sam Masterson	
2006	Once Not Far from Home	The Sheriff	Short
2006	The Ultimate Gift	Bill Stevens	
2006	We Are Marshall	Lloyd Boone	
2007	A Death in the Woods	Reuben	Short
2007	Autographs for French Fries	Andy Cook, Manager	Short
2007	Pawn'd	Joe Medici	Short
2007	Who's Your Monkey?	Chris	
2007	Dusk	James Farmer	Short
2008	A Minute Too Late	Lead	Short
2008	Conjurer	Fulton Moss	
2008	Sex Drive	Mr. Lafferty	
2009	Like Dandelion Dust	Judge Evams	
2009	National Lampoon's Van Wilder: Freshman Year	Sergeant Hayes	
2009	The Blind Side	Cousin Bobby	
2010	Dear John	Pastor	
2010	Father of Invention	Howard Camp	
2010	Prime of Your Life	Richardson	
2010	Letters to God	Bar Guy	
2010	Endure	Trooper Rodney Morris	
2010	Unrequited	Gill Austin	
2010	The Trial	Dr. Newbern	
2010	The Way Home	Chief Gary Thomas	
2011	A Little Bit of Heaven	Ad Agency Client	
2011	Super 8	Sheriff Pruitt	
2011	Seeking Justice	Joe Long	
2011	Footloose	Roger Dunbar	
2011	The Saints of Mt. Christopher	Tom	
2012	Hope Springs	Vince	
2013	The Ultimate Life	Uncle Bill	
2013	Wait No Longer	Judge Charles Mathis	Short
2014	Moms' Night Out	Sgt. Murphy	
2014	Foxcatcher	Fred Cole	
2014	Summer Snow	Mr. Jenkins	
2014	Kill the Messenger	Hansjorg Baier	
2014	Red Dirt Rising	Roy Lewallen	
2015	The Square Root of 2	Ben Lehrer	
2015	Christmas in the Smokies	Mr. Baxter	
2015	Woodlawn	Whitehurst	
2016	The Choice	Dr. McCarthy	
2016	Sully	Carl Clarke	
2016	The Wedding Party	Tobias	
2017	The Case for Christ	Ray Nelson	
2017	Thumper	Mr. Carter	
2017	Intent	Daniels	
2020	Safety	Chairman Diamond	

=== Television ===
Year	Title	Role	Notes
1982	The Catlins	Seth Quinn	
1985	Poison Ivy	Martin Blair	TV movie
1986	Dalton: Code of Vengeance II	Sergeant Brown	as James Brett Rice
1989–1992	Superboy	Whitehead / Suit	2 episodes
1990	B.L. Stryker	Benny	Episode: "Winner Takes All"
1990–1992	Swamp Thing	Headman / Everett Baxtor	2 episodes
1991	Wife, Mother, Murderer	Fowler	TV movie; as James Brett Rice
1992–1993	In the Heat of the Night	Delbert Pike / Brian Moss / Manager	3 episodes
1992	Stay the Night	Blanchard	TV movie
1992	I'll Fly Away	D.A. McKeeson / McKeeson	4 episodes
1993	Stolen Babies	Robert Taylor	TV movie
1993	With Hostile Intent	—N/a	TV movie; as James Brett Rice
1993	Deadly Relations	Tom Porteous	TV movie
1994	A Passion for Justice: The Hazel Brannon Smith Story	Sheriff Cole	TV movie
1994	Oldest Living Confederate Widow Tells All	Mag Exec	Uncredited
1994	Thunder in Paradise	Kenneth	Episode: "Distant Shout of Thunder"
1994	Fortune Hunter	Nick Gunn	Episode: "Millenium"
1994	Summertime Switch	Judge	TV movie
1995	Trade-Off	Angry Drunk	TV movie
1995	seaQuest 2032	Dustin Thaw / UEO Guard	2 episodes
1995	Pointman	Ellis Parker	Episode: "Prisoner of Love"
1995	Saved by the Light	Leonard	TV movie
1996	Andersonville	Lt. Dahlgren	TV movie
1996	The Cape	Technician #1	Episode: "Pilot"
1996	Sudden Terror: The Hijacking of School Bus #17	Detective Sims	TV movie
1996	Second Noah	Major Ed Thomas	Episode: "The Choice"
1997	Savannah	Bringer	Episode: "Where There's a Will..."
1997–2001	Walker, Texas Ranger	Detective Ed O'Carrol / Kyle Meadows / Danny Barnes	3 episodes
1998	From the Earth to the Moon	Sam Langfitt	Episode: "We Interrupt This Program"
1999	Passing Glory	—N/a	TV movie
1999	The Paper Route	The Man	Short
1999	Shake, Rattle and Roll: An American Love Story	Joe Hart	TV movie; as James Brett Rice
2000	The Runaway	Deputy Hugh	TV movie
2001	Three Blind Mice	Charlie Stubbs	TV movie
2002	Sheena	Shanahan	Episode: "Stranded in the Jungle"
2004	Frankenstein	Detective Dwight Frye	TV movie
2005	Charmed	Sheriff	Episode: "The Seven Year Witch"
2006	Aquaman	Commander Haley	TV pilot
2006	One Tree Hill	Detective	Episode: "I Love You But I've Chosen Darkness"
2007	The Staircase Murders	Detective Castell	TV movie
2008	Recount	Judge Charles Burton	TV movie
2009	Strokes	Mr. Hamilton	TV movie
2009	Criminal Minds	Detective Bates	Episode: "Bloodlines"
2009	Lie to Me	Chief Jack Morrow	Episode: "Unchained"
2009	The People v. Leo Frank	Luther Rosser	PBS Video
2009	Drop Dead Diva	Warren Gunther	Episode: "The Dress"
2011	Leverage	Alfred Ross	Episode: "The Van Gogh Job"
2011	The Glades	Gerry Whitlock	Episode: "Iron Pipeline"
2012	CSI: Crime Scene Investigation	Ben Gerard	Episode: "Altered Stakes"
2012	Firelight	Mr. Lewis	TV movie
2012	The Mentalist	Chief Burt Anson	Episode: "So Long, and Thanks for All the Red Snapper"
2012	TalhotBlond	Foreman	TV movie
2012	Burn Notice	Union Rep	Episode: "You Can Run"
2012–2013	Magic City	Senator Ned Sloat	8 episodes
2013	A Way Back Home	Wes Cameron	TV movie
2013	NCIS: Los Angeles	Anthony Trager	Episode: "The Lifelong Day"
2014	Suburgatory	Hubba	Episode: "The Ballad of Piggy Duckworth"
2014	True Blood	Paul Mills	Episode: "Lost Cause"
2015	Complications	Detective John Dacy	Episode: "Pilot"
2015	True Detective	Mr. Wyman	Episode: "Church in Ruins"
2015–2016	Transparent	Pastor Gene	3 episodes
2016	Angie Tribeca	Warden Harding	Episode: "Inside Man"
2016	Workaholics	Judge Brownton	Episode: "Meth Head Actor"
2016	NCIS	Captain RJ Hammond	Episode: "Decompressed"
2016	Roots	William Byrd	Episode: "Part 3"
2016–2017	Longmire	Tucker Baggett	4 episodes
2017	Lethal Weapon	Samuel Petry	Episode: "Lawmen"
2017	The Son	William Philpott	2 episodes
2017	Ballers	Councilman Bob Sawyer	Episode: "Bull Rush"
2017	The Good Doctor	Mr. Wilks	Episode: "Point Three Percent"
2017	There's... Johnny!	Andy's Dad	Episode: "Andy Goes to Hollywood"
2017	Snowfall	Senator Patrick	Original pilot
2018	Nobodies	B.G. Newbury	Episode: "Alone Star State"
2018	Beerfest: Thirst for Victory	Mr. Fitzgerald	TV movie
2018	Insatiable	Robert Armstrong Sr.	3 episodes
2020	9-1-1: Lone Star	Wayne Gettinger	2 episodes
2020	Paradise Lost	Uncle BB	Series regular
2020	USS Christmas	Captain Chet Jenkins	Hallmark Movie
