= All the Wrong Places (film) =

2000 American film by Martin Edwards

All The Wrong Places
- Directed by: Martin Edwards
- Written by: Martin Edwards
- Starring: Ali Hillis; Judy Del Guidice; Jeremy Klavens
- Cinematography: Bing Rao
- Edited by: Drina Lessard
- Music by: Jody Elff
- Production company: Reality Check! Films
- Distributed by: Brother Jack Films (USA DVD); Vanguard Cinema (Worldwide DVD)
- Release date: September 2000 (Brooklyn Film Festival)
- Running time: 95 minutes
- Country: United States
- Language: English

All the Wrong Places is a 2000 American independent film directed by Martin Edwards. The film is a romantic comedy with actress Ali Hillis in the main role.

The plot follows Marissa (Ali Hillis) as she decides to become a filmmaker.

The film was shown at the 2000 Brooklyn Film Festival where the director tied with Wendy Jo Cohen for an award.

== Cast ==
- Ali Hillis as Marisa Baron
- Jeremy Klavens as Paul Kelly
- Alyce LaTourelle as Melissa
- Brian Patrick Sullivan as Adam Kelly
- Ted Brunson as Tim Baron
- Brian Driscoll as Bill Banks
- Collette Porteous as Ruby
- Michele Carlo as Tricia (credited as Michelle Carlo)
- Stan Carp as The Cabbie
- Judy Del Giudice as Dr. Lamb (credited as Judy DelGiudice)
- Lilith Beitchman as Chloe
