= Narrative Television Network =

Narrative Television Network (NTN) makes movies, television shows and educational programming accessible to millions of blind and visually impaired people and their families. Founded in 1988 by Jim Stovall, the Narrative Television Network unobtrusively adds the voice of a narrator to the existing program between the dialogue so that blind or low vision people can hear what they can't see. The Narrative Television Network has received an Emmy Award, a Media Access Award and an International Film and Video Award for its pioneering work in making movies, television and educational programming accessible for the visually impaired. The Narrative Television Network website offers readers a “Text Only” version of its pages to increase accessibility for blind and visually impaired readers who use screen readers.

== History ==
When Narrative Television Network creator and president Jim Stovall lost his eyesight at age 28, he initially felt that he never wanted to leave the controlled environment of his home. Shortly thereafter, Jim Stovall met Kathy Harper in a support group for blind and visually impaired individuals, and the two discussed the challenges blind and visually impaired TV and movie audience members face because of missed visual components of stories.

Jim and Kathy began to research together and discovered that 13 million people in the United States have visual impairment severe enough to limit their enjoyment of TV shows and movies. This research inspired the two to develop a plan to make programming more accessible for blind and visually impaired people, and started by borrowing equipment to record some narrative soundtracks to begin their work with the goal of adding these soundtracks to existing movie audio.

NTN now has 1,200 broadcast and cable affiliates, and is shown in eleven countries outside of the United States.

== Narrators ==
Narrative Television Network founder and president Jim Stovall works as one of the three primary narrators, adding his voice to educational and informational programming.

Susan Crane and Beth Sharp also work as primary narrators.

Susan Crane joined Narrative Television Network in 2001 to narrate television programming and movies. Beth Sharp joined Narrative Television Network in 2002 to work as a scriptwriter and to perform programming voice work.

== Awards ==
1990: Emmy Award

1991: Media Access Award

1993: Golden Georgi Award

1997: Evan Kemp Entrepreneurship Award from the President's Committee on Employment of People with Disabilities

1998: Blue Chip Enterprise Award

2000: International Humanitarian of the Year Award

2001: Toastmaster's International Communication and Leadership Award

2006: Reynolds Society Achievement Award, Massachusetts Eye and Ear

2007: Heartland Film Festival Award for The Ultimate Gift

2007: Dove Honor for The Ultimate Gift

2008: Movie Guide Award for The Ultimate Gift

2009: Leader of the Year from the Department of Rehabilitative Services

2011: Judges' Choice Award, New Media Film Festival, for The Lamp

2011: Jim Stovall, NTN founder / president, named Chairman of the Description Leadership Network (DLN), made up of all of the industry providers in the field
