= Julie Ryan (Irish producer) =

Irish film and TV producer

Julie Ryan is an Irish film and TV producer from Cork, Ireland, known for her work on The Young Offenders (2016), I Never Cry (2020), and Finding You (2020). She is the managing director of MK1Studios Productions.

== Career ==
Ryan began her career in the media industry in the Irish TV company TV3, where she trained in the sports department as a reporter. She also spend a period moonlighting as an autocue operator, continuity announcer, news librarian, and even spent a stint as a sports anchor in Dublin radio station 98FM. Ryan then began her film career as a freelance producer of non-scripted television, working in the US in this area for 10 years. In 2012, Ryan stepped up to the role of producer on The Fear, an Irish hidden camera TV show in which members of the Irish public are pranked in various locations around the country.

Ryan made a name for herself in 2016, when her feature film The Young Offenders was a breakout success both nationally and internationally, after winning Best Irish Feature Film at the 2016 Galway Film Fleadh, alongside A Date for Mad Mary.

Following her success with The Young Offenders, Ryan went on to produce several critically-acclaimed international co-productions, including Irish-Polish co-production I Never Cry (2020), which won the Grand Prix and Cineuropa Award at Mons International Film Festival in 2021; indie feature A Bend in the River (2020) Intruder (2020) for Channel 5, and The Holiday (TV Series - 2021).

=== Production company ===
Ryan is the managing director of MK1Studios Productions, which she founded to promote diversity, inclusion and innovation through storytelling. MK1 is Dublin, Ireland based, with bases in Cork, Ireland and Los Angeles, California.

== Filmography ==
Ryan's film and TV credits include:

- The Holiday (2021 – TV series)
- Intruder (2020 – TV series)
- A Bend in the River (2020 – feature film)
- Finding You (2020 – feature film)
- I Never Cry (2020 – feature film)
- Christmas Perfection (2018 – feature film)
- Beach Slap (2017 – TV series)
- The Young Offenders (2016 – feature film)
- The Sin Bin (2015 – TV series)
- The Fear (2015 – TV series)
