= Woodlawn (film) =

- Theatrical release poster
- Directed by: Erwin Brothers
- Written by: Quinton Peeples; Jon Erwin
- Produced by: Kevin Downes; Daryl Lefever; Joe Knopp
- Starring: Sean Astin; Nic Bishop; Caleb Castille; Sherri Shepherd; Jon Voight
- Cinematography: Kristopher Kimlin
- Edited by: Brent McCorkle; Andrew Erwin
- Music by: Paul Mills
- Production companies: Crescent City Pictures; Lightworkers Media; Pure Flix Entertainment
- Distributed by: Pure Flix Entertainment
- Release date: October 16, 2015
- Running time: 124 minutes
- Country: United States
- Language: English
- Budget: $13 million
- Box office: $14.4 million

Woodlawn is a 2015 American Christian sports drama film directed by the Erwin Brothers. Based on the true story of Tandy Gerelds and Tony Nathan, it stars Sean Astin, Nic Bishop, Caleb Castille, Sherri Shepherd, Jon Voight, and C. Thomas Howell. It was produced by Kevin Downes and Daryl Lefever with Crescent City Pictures and Red Sky Studios and was released on October 16, 2015, by Pure Flix Entertainment.

== Plot ==
Miami Dolphins superstar running back Tony Nathan attended Woodlawn High School in Birmingham, Alabama during the early 1970s. Nathan became a model student and the first black football superstar in Alabama history. He and other black students played on the mainly white team under coach Tandy Gerelds at a time when racial tensions were very high. He was credited with helping to unify the team, which went on to play the biggest high school game in Alabama history. After high school Nathan played for Coach Paul "Bear" Bryant at the University of Alabama. He later played under coach Don Shula with the Miami Dolphins and was a starter in two Super Bowls. The 2015 film Woodlawn starring Caleb Castille as Nathan and Nic Bishop as Coach Gerelds, with Jon Voight as Bear Bryant is based on his high school years.

When Woodlawn High School in Birmingham, Alabama, is controversially desegregated in 1973, gifted black athlete Tony Nathan and several other black players join the school's predominantly white football team. The coach, Tandy Gerelds, tells the team to use their shared anger at repeated violent incidents to unite them, but black and white players clash on and off the field. After a riot at the school, Gerelds lets traveling sports chaplain Hank Erwin speak to the team as a "motivational speaker". Hank's speech moves nearly the entire team to accept Hank's invitation to commit their lives to follow Jesus Christ, and to join in prayer and work. Gerelds does not accept the invitation, and is unsure what to make of the event.

The team loses its first game, but after Gerelds decides to play Nathan over the objections of some of the white players' parents, they win their next game. Nathan becomes a breakout star, and the team goes on a long winning streak leading up to their final game with rival L. Frazier Banks High School.

Banks coach "Shorty" White instructs his players to target Nathan, and the repeated hard tackles take their toll. Nathan scores a touchdown, but is injured by a vicious late hit and is unable to continue playing. Woodlawn loses, but Gerelds expresses pride in his team for "the men they've become". After coming to faith Gerelds eventually seeks out Nathan's church during a Sunday service, where he testifies to the change in his life, and asks to be baptized.

Many people wonder about the turnaround in Woodlawn's team, and Hank arranges a meeting between the Woodlawn players and Banks players, leading to a spiritual awakening on the Banks team as well. Gerelds and White hold an unprecedented joint football camp before the 1974 season, and a camaraderie develops between the two teams. Both go undefeated for the season until their final game against each other, which because of the stardom of Nathan and Banks quarterback Jeff Rutledge, draws a huge record crowd.

A few years later, now working as an insurance agent, Gerelds admits to a customer that while they did lose that big game, the transformation he witnessed in the lives of many people was miraculous.

After Nathan, now playing for Alabama, carries his team to victory in the 1979 Sugar Bowl, he calls Gerelds at home and expresses his gratitude, encouraging him to return to coaching.

== Cast ==
- Sean Astin as Hank Erwin
- Nic Bishop as Coach Tandy Gerelds
- Caleb Castille as Tony Nathan
- Sherri Shepherd as Louise Nathan
- Jon Voight as Paul "Bear" Bryant
- Joy Brunson as Johnnie
- Lance Nichols as Junior
- Devon Franklin as Preacher
- C. Thomas Howell as George "Shorty" White
- Kevin Sizemore as Coach Jerry Stearns
- Brett Rice as Whitehurst
- Virginia Williams as Debbie
- Brando Eaton as Morton
- Richard Kohnke as Jeff Rutledge
- Jet Jurgensmeyer as Todd
- Kirk B. R. Woller as Owen Davis
- Marcus Henderson as Reginald
- Francesca Battistelli as Linda
- Blake Burgess as Mike Allyson
- Carlton Byrd as Malik
- Bone Hampton as Barber

== Reception ==
=== Box office ===
Woodlawn grossed $14.4 million. In the United States and Canada, the film opened simultaneously with Bridge of Spies, Goosebumps, and Crimson Peak on October 16, 2015. On the film's opening day it grossed $1.5 million, above studio expectations. In its opening weekend, it grossed $4 million, finishing 9th at the box office.

=== Lifeline calls ===
A lifeline featured at the end of the film received over 100,000 responses.

=== Critical response ===
Woodlawn has received generally positive reviews from critics. According to the review aggregator website Rotten Tomatoes, 79% of critics have given the film a positive review based on 14 reviews, with an average rating of 6.37/10. At Metacritic, the film has received a weighted average score of 57 out of 100 based on 4 critics, indicating "mixed or average reviews". On CinemaScore, audiences gave the film the rare average grade of "A+" on an A+ to F scale.

== See also ==
- List of American football films
