= Jim Van Eerden =

Eco-friendly automobile company founder (born 1964)

- Born: August 1, 1964 (age 62); Milwaukee, Wisconsin
- Known for: CEO of 5th Element Group
- Spouse: Rachel Ann (Shevey) Van Eerden

James Van Eerden (born August 1, 1964) is an American businessman, film producer, and entrepreneur. He is a co-founder and managing director of Helixx Partners, LLC, president of 5th Element Group, and co-founder of Sevenly.

== Education ==
Eerden earned a Bachelor of Arts from Grove City College and later received a 2010 Alumni Achievement Award. He completed a graduate certificate at St Peter's College, Oxford, and holds a Master of Arts in philosophy from Trinity International University as well as an MBA from Wake Forest University. He pursued doctoral studies in global education at Gordon–Conwell Theological Seminary.

He has served as the Entrepreneur in Residence at Grove City College's Center for Entrepreneurship and Innovation.

== Business ==
Eerden is a co-founder and managing director of Helixx Partners, LLC, and a co-founder of Sevenly. He is also a CEO of 5th element.

== Media production ==
He has served as a producer or executive producer for the documentaries Running the Sahara (2007) and War Child (2008).
