= Richard G. Jewell =

American academic administrator

Richard G. Jewell was the eighth president of Grove City College, a Christian liberal arts college in Grove City, Pennsylvania, United States. The 1967 Grove City graduate assumed the presidency in fall of 2003 after a successful career in law and business. He left his position in 2014 and was succeeded by Paul J. McNulty. In June 2015, he was appointed to a two-year term as commissioner of the Pennsylvania Gaming Control Board by Speaker of the Pennsylvania House of Representatives Mike Turzai.

Immediately before becoming President of Grove City College, Jewell was the Pittsburgh director of Navigant Consulting Inc., the nation's largest forensic accounting firm.

Jewell is known throughout the Pittsburgh region for his leadership in numerous civic groups. Prior to assuming the presidency, Jewell was also very involved in Pennsylvania politics and held the position of finance chairman for the Allegheny County Republican Party.

As a student at Grove City, Jewell served as the Student Government Association President and Editor-in-Chief of the student newspaper, while also winning multiple varsity swimming championships. Jewell also was a member of the Kappa Alpha Phi fraternity. Jewell capped off his time at Grove City in 1967 when he was selected as Omicron Delta Kappa's Man of the Year and graduated with honors in political science. After he completed his undergraduate degree, Jewell earned his J.D. from the University of Michigan Law School. In 1989, he was inducted into the college's Swimming and Diving Hall of Fame.
