= Jim Stovall =

American writer (born 1958)

- Born: August 3, 1958 (age 68); United States
- Citizenship: American
- Occupation: Author
- Writing career
- Notable work: The Ultimate Gift
- Notable awards: Emmy Award, International Humanitarian of the Year Award, Entrepreneur of the Year Award
- Website: jimstovall.com

Jim Stovall (born August 3, 1958) is an American writer best known for his bestselling novel The Ultimate Gift. The book was made into the movie The Ultimate Gift, distributed by 20th Century Fox. The Ultimate Gift has a prequel called The Ultimate Life and a sequel called The Ultimate Legacy.

Stovall is blind and is an advocate on behalf of people with blindness. He works to make television and movies accessible to the blind as President of the Narrative Television Network, an organization that has received various award recognitions including an Emmy award, a Media Access Award, and an International Film and Video Award.

Stovall lost his eyesight at age 29. Shortly thereafter, Stovall met Kathy Harper in a support group for blind and visually impaired individuals, and the two discussed the challenges blind and visually impaired TV and movie audience members face because of missed visual components of stories.

Stovall and Harper began to research together and discovered that 13 million people in the United States had visual impairment severe enough to limit their enjoyment of TV shows and movies. This research inspired the two to develop a plan to make programming more accessible for blind and visually impaired people, and started by borrowing equipment to record some narrative soundtracks to begin their work with the goal of adding these soundtracks to existing movie audio. Thus the Narrative Television Network was founded in 1988.

He was chosen as the International Humanitarian of the Year, joining Jimmy Carter, Nancy Reagan, and Mother Teresa as recipients of this honor.

He has also received an Honorary Doctorate of Law from ORU for his work with disabled people.

In the book, Forbes Great Success Stories: Twelve Tales of Victory Wrested from Defeat by Alan Farnham, Malcolm Stevenson "Steve" Forbes Jr., president and CEO of Forbes magazine, said "Jim Stovall is one of the most extraordinary men of our era."
