= Colin Broderick =

Irish filmmaker

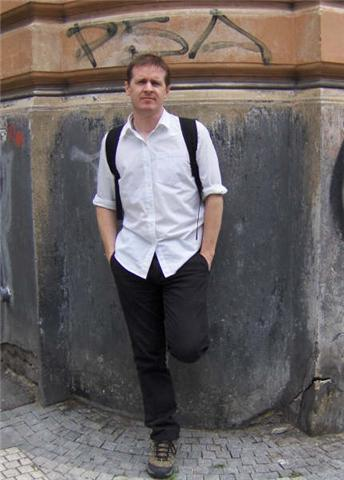
Broderick in Prague

Colin Broderick (born c. 1968) is a Northern Irish writer and filmmaker.

== Early life and education ==
Colin Broderick was born around 1968 and grew up County Tyrone, Northern Ireland. He moved to New York City in 1988 when he was 20.

== Career ==
=== Books ===
Broderick's first memoir, Orangutan, was published by Random House in 2009. It describes his first twenty years as an immigrant in New York City, in Broderick's words, "working construction, the drinking, the failed marriages, jail, the usual stuff."

His 2013 follow-up memoir detailing his childhood growing up in Northern Ireland, entitled That's That, was also published by Random House.

=== Films ===
Broderick's first feature film, Emerald City, premiered at the Curzon Cinemas theatre in Soho, London on 27 November 2016 as part of The London Irish Film Festival. The movie is loosely based on his own experiences of working in the construction trade in New York City while trying to establish a career as a writer. It was produced with support from Brendan Coyle's Anderson Shelter Productions and Josh Brolin's Brolin Productions. Coyle is listed as a co-producer. John Duddy, a former professional boxer from Derry, Northern Ireland who made his acting debut in Broderick's first stage play, was cast in the film as Podge, an ex-fighter working in construction.

Along with producer Kevin McCann, Broderick co-wrote The Rising: 1916, a historical thriller about the 1916 Irish rebellion, in development and seeking funding since 2015. Brendan Coyle was attached to play Irish politician Augustine Birrell. Also attached were Liam Neeson's son Micheál Richardson, set to play Irish revolutionary Michael Collins (as his father did in the 1996 film Michael Collins); Fiona Shaw as Countess Markievicz; and Colin Morgan and David O'Hara in the roles of revolutionary leaders Sean McDermott and James Connolly, respectively. Neeson's role as Collins was confirmed in 2021. As of May 2021 it was still seeking funding, but the official Facebook page for the film reported that they were determined it would get made.

=== Theatre ===
Broderick has had two of his plays performed in New York City. His first, Father Who, ran for three weeks at the Bronx's Macalla Theatre Company, which has since closed. The cast included John Duddy, in his first acting role. The play was also performed at Theatre 80, a historic theater and former speakeasy located on St. Mark's Place in Manhattan's East Village, for a shorter run in early 2014. On 7 March 2014, Broderick tweeted that Liam Neeson had attended a performance.

Broderick and his partners Don Creedon and Stephen Smallhorne co-founded the Poor Mouth Theatre Company in the Bronx in 2010.

Poor Mouth presented Broderick's second play, Spudmunchers in 2012. The production was staged in a popular Bronx bar in 2012. Broderick also directed the play, a story of two Irish brothers living together in Woodlawn Heights, a predominantly Irish-American working-class neighborhood in the Bronx.
