= Barrett Trotter =

American football player and coach (born 1989)

Current position
- Title: Head coach
- Team: Bayside Academy

Biographical details
- Born: February 10, 1989 (age 37); Mobile, Alabama, U.S.

Playing career
- 2008–2011: Auburn
- Position: Quarterback

Coaching career (HC unless noted)
- 2012: BA HS (QB)
- 2013: Arkansas State (GA)
- 2013–2014: St. Louis/LA Rams (Scout)
- 2015–2016: St. Louis/LA Rams (OA)
- 2017: North Carolina (OA)
- 2018—2020: Auburn (OA)
- 2021—2022: Briarwood Christian School (assistant)
- 2023—present: Bayside Academy

Accomplishments and honors

Championships
- BCS national champion (2010)

Barrett Trotter (born February 10, 1989) is an American former football quarterback. Trotter currently serves as the head coach for Bayside Academy in Daphne, Alabama.

== Playing career ==
Trotter previously served as backup quarterback to Heisman Trophy winner Cam Newton for the 2010 Auburn Tigers National Championship Team. In 2010, Trotter completed 6-of-9 passes for 64 yards, rushed for 68 yards and a touchdown. His sole touchdown came on a 18 yard run against Louisiana-Monroe. In the SEC Championship Game against South Carolina, Trotter rushed twice for 37 yards and connected on his only pass attempt for 16 yards. In 2011, he was named the starting quarterback for the Auburn Tigers football team. He led the Tigers to a win over Virginia in the Chick-Fil-A Bowl. During his tenure at Auburn, he was named to the SEC Academic Honor Roll 4 consecutive years, and was a National Football Foundation's Hampton Scholar. While at Auburn, Trotter was part of a Tigers' program that earned victories in the Outback Bowl, Chick-Fil-A Bowl, SEC Championship, and the National Championship.

== Coaching career ==
In 2013, Trotter was a Graduate Assistant at Arkansas State University.

Trotter originally joined the Rams in 2013 and worked for two years in a dual capacity with Football Operations and as a Scouting Assistant. In this role, Trotter evaluated players and was responsible for gathering and tracking player information in preparation for the NFL Draft. Additionally, he helped coordinate daily football operations as well as the team’s travel, serving as the advance point person for all of the Rams’ road trips.

Trotter spent 2 years with the St. Louis / Los Angeles Rams, (NFL) as an Offensive Assistant / Quality Control Coach. Trotter was responsible for breaking down film of upcoming opponents, self scouting the Rams Offense, leading the Scout Team Defense in practice, as well as assisting with the team’s Quarterbacks.

In 2017, Trotter spent the season as an Offensive Assistant with the North Carolina Tarheels, where he assisted in game planning, film evaluation, scouting opponent defenses, helping develop offensive schemes and game strategies, while working primarily with Receivers.

In 2018, Trotter returned to his alma mater, Auburn, as an offensive analyst. In his role as Offensive Analyst, Trotter analyzes and grades player performance, breaks down practice and game film, and studies defensive film of upcoming opponents. He is also involved in the strategies and building blocks of the weekly game plan, and spotting trends that help make that plan successful.

In 2021, Trotter returned to Briarwood and spent two seasons as an assistant coach.

On February 16, 2023, Trotter became the new head football coach at Bayside Academy in Daphne, Alabama being the school's third football coach.
