= Geordie Brown =

Canadian actor

Geordie Brown (born May 14, 1991) is a Canadian actor and singer best known for originating the lead role in Jukebox Hero: The Musical, presented at Toronto's Ed Mirvish Theatre, and for serving as guest vocalist with Foreigner on the band's 2025 Canadian arena tour.

== Career ==
=== Film & Television ===
Brown began his professional career in film and television, garnering credits such as Stephen King's Bag of Bones (A&E), and a supporting role alongside Kelly Preston in the film adaptation of Jodi Picoult's The Tenth Circle (Lifetime).

=== Theatre ===
Brown's theatre career includes regional credits at Neptune Theatre (Halifax) and The Guild (Charlottetown).

As director, Brown's theatrical credits include Stan Rogers: A Matter of Heart, Singalong Jubilee: A Musical Tribute, Pleasureville by Ellen Denny, and Tapestry: A Tribute to Carole King.

Brown co-created Could I Have This Dance?, a musical featuring the hits of Anne Murray, and directed a special concert performance of the show in celebration of the Anne Murray Centre's 30th Anniversary in 2019. Prior to the performance, a partnership with SquarePeg Venture Capital was announced when BroadwayWorld quoted Managing Director Doug Ross saying "We are proud to be supporting this great Atlantic Canada production that is destined for the West End."

=== Music ===
Brown created and performed The Songs of The Rat Pack, a one-man tribute to Frank Sinatra, Dean Martin, and Sammy Davis Jr. at Neptune Theatre in 2017. The show, which was dedicated to his late grandmother, was recorded and released as a live album.

In August 2025, BraveWords.com reported that Brown would release his debut rock single, "Won't You Come With Me". The single is a cross-generational re-recording of a 1978 rock song by Nova Scotia rock band, Titan, of which Brown's father was a founding member.

=== Jukebox Hero and Foreigner ===
In March 2018, Brown was cast in the lead role of the world premiere of Foreigner's Jukebox Hero: The Musical, to be performed in Calgary and Edmonton. The musical's book was written by Dick Clement and Ian La Frenais. Brown later performed in the musical at the Ed Mirvish Theatre in Toronto in February 2019.

Brown made a surprise appearance with Foreigner in his home province of Nova Scotia in March 2019 during the band's Cold As Ice tour, singing "Hot Blooded" with lead singer Kelly Hansen.

Brown's involvement with the band continued in 2025, when Foreigner announced a Canadian tour with Brown as guest vocalist. Foreigner founder Mick Jones was quoted by Billboard.com saying:

“I was most impressed by Geordie’s performances of Juke Box Hero, The Musical in Canada. He is not only a consummate vocalist, but a verified Broadway actor to boot. We look forward to welcoming him at our shows on Foreigner’s 2025 Canadian tour."

The 13-city tour was billed as a prelude to a new production of the musical in 2026.
