= The Tenth Circle =

2006 novel by Jodi Picoult

- First edition cover
- Author: Jodi Picoult
- Illustrator: Dustin Weaver
- Cover artist: Zoë Sadokierski
- Language: English
- Genre: Family saga
- Publisher: Allen & Unwin
- Publication date: 17 March 2006
- Publication place: United States
- Media type: Print (hardback & paperback)
- Pages: 387 pp
- ISBN: 1-74114-693-3
- OCLC: 224803646

The Tenth Circle (2006) is the thirteenth novel by the American author Jodi Picoult. The novel deals with date rape, and father/daughter relationships. The novel heavily references Dante Alighieri's Inferno.

== Plot ==
When freshman Trixie Stone accuses her ex-boyfriend, Jason Underhill, of raping her at a party, students and townspeople, alike, are quick to take Jason's side when he claims that their intercourse was consensual. Trixie's parents, Daniel, a mild-mannered comic book artist from a rough upbringing, and Laura, a college professor having an affair with one of her students, become involved, and Jason, whose life is supposedly ruined by Trixie's accusation, leaps from a bridge, dying by suicide. Although Jason's death was first presumed to be suicide, Trixie is quickly turned to as a suspect, accused of pushing Jason off the bridge. Trixie then flees to the Yup'ik region of Alaska where her father grew up. Daniel and Laura eventually find Trixie in Alaska.

At the end of the novel, Laura confesses to Daniel that she was present when Jason died. Jason, who was intoxicated, lunged at Laura because her daughter Trixie was ruining his life. Laura pushed Jason off the bridge but he held onto her. Laura reached to his hand, but then let go, thus revealing that Trixie is innocent, but Laura is not. The novel concludes with the final chapter with Daniel's latest comic, showing a father reunited with his daughter, after saving her from the depths of hell.

The main plot and subplots are juxtaposed throughout the book with Daniel's latest comic, entitled The Tenth Circle, which parallels with Daniel's life and the novel itself.

In the comic, inserted into the book, there's a hidden message. The message, “Nothing is easier than self-deceit, for what each man wishes that he also believes to be true” – DEMOSTHENES

== Title ==
The title, The Tenth Circle, is a reference to the first canticle, Inferno, of The Divine Comedy by Dante.

== Main characters ==
Trixie Stone: Protagonist, ninth-grade high school student, who accuses Jason Underhill of rape.

Daniel Stone: Trixie's father, a comic-book artist from Alaska.

Laura Stone: Trixie's mother, a college professor.

Jason Underhill: Trixie's boyfriend, accused of raping her, fell to his death from the bridge in town.

Zephyr Santorelli-Weinstein: Trixie's best friend.

Moss Minton: Jason's best friend, and casually dated Zephyr, Trixie's best friend.

== Adaptations ==
The novel was made into a Lifetime Network movie, which premiered June 28, 2008 at 9pm Eastern. The film starred Kelly Preston as Laura Stone, Ron Eldard as Daniel Stone, Haley Beauchamp as Zephyr Santorelli-Weinstein, Jamie Johnston as Jason Underhill, Geordie Brown as Moss Minton, and Brittany Robertson as Trixie Stone from Sony Pictures Television.

== See also ==
- Family saga
- Yup'ik
