= Jordan Waller =

British actor and writer (born 1992)

- Born: Jordan Sebastian Waller; 1992 (age 33–34); Bristol, England
- Education: University of Oxford
- Occupations: Actor and writer
- Years active: 2016–present

Jordan Sebastian Waller (born 1992) is a British actor and writer, known for playing Lord Alfred Paget in the television series Victoria.

== Early life and education ==
Waller was born in Bristol and raised by three lesbian parents: his birth mother, Miranda, her partner at the time of his birth, Dawn, and her next partner, Jayne. It is a subject he has talked and written about extensively. As he was conceived via sperm donation, he has also promoted the need for more men to become sperm donors and is currently pursuing becoming a sperm donor himself.

He was educated at Bristol Grammar School, an independent day school, following which he studied French at Oxford University. He was a member of the Oxford University Dramatic Society (OUDS), where he appeared in The Picture of Dorian Grey, Betrayal, Dead Funny, Much Ado About Nothing and Twelfth Night.

== Career ==
In 2019, Waller released Two Heads Creek, a horror comedy that he wrote and starred in. It was also released in the UK in early 2020. He also wrote Off the Rails for Bill Kenwright, which stars Judi Dench, Kelly Preston, Sally Phillips and Jenny Seagrove and was also released in 2020.

In February 2019, Waller premiered his one-man show "The D Word" at the Vault Festival about his unconventional upbringing as the sperm donor child of lesbian parents, the death of one of his mothers and his search for his biological father. "The D Word" changed to Son of Dyke for its showing at the Edinburgh Festival that same year.

In January 2025, Waller's play "A Role To Die For" about the casting of the next James Bond opened at the Barn Theatre, Cirencester. The play is transferring to the Marylebone Theatre in July 2025.

== Personal life ==
Waller is gay.

== Filmography ==
=== Films ===
Year	Title	Role	Notes
2016	Love & Friendship	Edward	
2017	Darkest Hour	Randolph Churchill	
2019	Two Heads Creek	Norman	Writer
2019	Rosemary and Basil	Basil	Short film
2021	Off the Rails	Spanish DJ	Writer

=== Television ===
Year	Title	Role	Notes
2016–2019	Victoria	Lord Alfred Paget	recurring series 1, main series 2–3
2021	The Syndicate	Michel	4 episodes
2023	The Gilded Age	Oscar Wilde	Episode: "Head to Head"
