= The Tenth Circle (film) =

- DVD cover
- Based on: The Tenth Circle by Jodi Picoult
- Screenplay by: Maria Nation
- Directed by: Peter Markle
- Starring: Kelly Preston; Ron Eldard; Jamie Johnston; Britt Robertson; Haley Beauchamp
- Music by: Velton Ray Bunch
- Country of origin: Canada
- Original language: English

Production
- Producer: Michael Mahoney
- Cinematography: Joel Ransom
- Editors: Patrick McMahon; Marc Pollon
- Running time: 89 minutes
- Production company: SLG Productions

Original release
- Network: Lifetime
- Release: June 28, 2008

The Tenth Circle is a 2008 Canadian drama/mystery television film directed by Peter Markle and starring Kelly Preston, Ron Eldard, Jamie Johnston, Britt Robertson, and Haley Beauchamp. It is based on the 2006 Jodi Picoult novel, The Tenth Circle The film premiered on June 28, 2008, on Lifetime.

== Plot ==
When freshman Trixie Stone accuses her ex-boyfriend Jason Underhill of raping her, everyone is quick to take his side when he claims their intercourse was consensual. Trixie's parents, Daniel, a mild mannered comic book artist from a harsh background, and Laura, a college professor of literature sleeping with one of her students, become involved. After questioning Trixie and conducting a blood test it is revealed that Trixie was drugged, and people begin to believe that she was really raped. Jason, whose life is supposedly ruined, leaps from a bridge. Although first presumed to be suicide, Trixie and her father are later suspected of pushing him off the bridge. After the police call Daniel requesting blood samples from him and Trixie to compare to blood found under Jason's fingernails, he attempts to flee with her in his car but is soon stopped by the police, and he then tells Trixie that he was the one who pushed Jason off the bridge.

Daniel is brought in to the police station and confesses to pushing Jason, but is then brought to another room with Laura inside. Laura confesses to Daniel that she was there when Jason died. Jason (who was drunk) and Laura get into an argument as he is standing outside the bridge rails and in the struggle he loses his balance and falls off the bridge. Laura tries to grab him but is unable to pull him up and he falls down leaving scratches on Laura's hands. The police decide not to press charges against Laura and the whole family is released.

== Cast ==
- Britt Robertson as Trixie Stone
- Kelly Preston as Laura Stone
- Ron Eldard as Daniel Stone
- Jamie Johnston as Jason Underhill
- Michael Riley as Mike Bartholomy
- Haley Beauchamp as Zepher Santorelli
- Geordie Brown as Moss Minton
- Gil Anderson as Shakina
- Gary Levert as Mr. Underhill
- Deborah Post as Mrs. Underhill
- Jon Cor as Seth
- Leah Fassett as Jessica
- Mauralea Austin as Marita
- Gharrett Patrick Paon as Wise Ass Kid

== Production ==
The film was shot in Windsor, Nova Scotia.
