= Close to the Sun =

Close to the Sun may refer to:

- Close to the Sun (album), a 2017 album by Place Vendome
- Close to the Sun (video game), a 2019 video game
- "Close to the Sun" (FBI: International), a 2022 television episode
- "Close to the Sun", a mashup song by Neil Cicierega from his 2014 album Mouth Silence
- "Close to the Sun", a song by German DJ TheFatRat

== See also ==
- Too Close to the Sun, a musical
- Closer to the Sun (disambiguation)
- Corona, the outer atmosphere of a star
- Perihelion, the closest point of an orbit to the sun
