= One More Chance (1981 film) =

- VHS cover
- Directed by: Sam Firstenberg
- Written by: Sam Firstenberg
- Produced by: Yoram Globus; Menahem Golan; David Womark
- Starring: John LaMotta; Kirstie Alley
- Cinematography: Jonathon Braun; Ken Gibb
- Edited by: K.V. Hoenig
- Music by: David Powell
- Distributed by: Cannon Film Distributors
- Release date: January 1981
- Running time: 90 minutes
- Country: United States
- Language: English

One More Chance is a 1981 film written and directed by Sam Firstenberg, the film marks his directorial debut.

== Plot ==
An ex-con returns home to find that his family left and he has no idea where they went. Only a neighbor knows where they moved, but does not want to give him the information until he can show that he has changed.

== Principal cast ==
Actor	Role
John LaMotta	Pete Bales
Kirstie Alley	Sheila
Marvin Flint	George
Logan Clarke	Carter
Wayne Alford	David
