= Closer to the Sun =

Closer to the Sun may refer to:

- Closer to the Sun (Slightly Stoopid album), 2005
- Closer to the Sun (Guy Sebastian album), 2006
- Closer to the Sun, by Tyketto, 2026

== See also ==
- Close to the Sun (disambiguation)
