= Two Heads Creek =

- DVD cover
- Directed by: Jesse O'Brien
- Written by: Jordan Waller
- Produced by: Jayne Chard; Vickie Gest; Steven Matusko; Brett Thornquest; Judd Tilyard
- Starring: Jordan Waller; Kathryn Wilder; Helen Dallimore; Kevin Harrington; Stephen Hunter; Gary Sweet; Kerry Armstrong
- Cinematography: Samuel Baulch
- Edited by: Digby Hogan
- Music by: Ryan Elliott Stevens
- Production companies: Hummingbird Films; Dicentium Films; Storm Vision Entertainment
- Release date: 21 November 2019 (Australia)
- Running time: 85 minutes
- Countries: Australia; United Kingdom
- Language: English

Two Heads Creek is a 2019 Australian-British horror film directed by Jesse O'Brien. It was released on 21 November 2019 in Australia.

== Plot ==
While mourning their mother Gabriella, Norman and Anna discover that she had adopted them and that their birth mother Mary lived in small, remote Australian town of Two Heads Creek. Arriving in the town from overseas, they learn that she owned all of the businesses in the area and quickly meet all of the town's residents. One resident, Hans, wants the siblings to quickly leave town and attempts to convince them to leave by lying that Mary died years ago. When caught, he changes the story to say that she died a day ago and that the funeral will be held the following day. After settling down for the night Norman is stabbed by one of the townspeople, which another inhabitant, Daisy, claims was done out of a belief that Norman's birth brought about a plague that killed all of the town's pigs. Mary sent Norman and Anna away out of fear that the townspeople would seek revenge.

During the funeral the following day Norman grows increasingly suspicious when the body doesn't resemble a photograph of their mother. He also notices that the immigration officer that they spoke to in the airport has arrived in town and later digs up Mary's coffin, only for it to be empty. Aware of Norman's concerns but uninterested in anything other than gaining an inheritance, Anna leaves town. While she is gone Norman discovers that the town's true purpose is to kill problem immigrants and turn them into sausage, something that the Australian government uses to their advantage. He tries to rescue some tourists that had been captured for this very purpose, but is instead caught himself and knocked out. Before he loses consciousness he sees that one of the townspeople, Daisy, was also imprisoned. He awakens to find himself at the town's Australia Day celebration where they indulge in cannibalistic behaviors. Norman is rescued by Anna and he confronts Hans, who confesses that he is the siblings' father before he is murdered by a townsperson. Before they can be killed themselves, Norman and Anna are rescued by their mother Mary.

Mary reveals that the townspeople began eating human flesh after the pigs died off and found that they enjoyed the experience. She kept silent out of fear that Daisy, who is also her child, would be put in danger. While she sent Anna and Norman away, Mary kept up with their lives, proud of their accomplishments. Mary kept a tenuous peace with the villagers until she finally admitted she wanted to leave, after which they tried to kill her. To keep her safe, Hans faked her death. Mary, Anna, and Norman ultimately defeat the townspeople during a showdown that leaves only Mary and her children alive. The film ends with the family opening up a vegan food truck together.

== Cast ==
- Kathryn Wilder as Annabelle
- Gary Sweet as Hans
- Jordan Waller as Norman
- Kerry Armstrong as Mary
- Stephen Hunter as Clive
- Helen Dallimore as Apple
- Don Bridges as Uncle Morris
- Kevin Harrington as Noah
- Ilana Collins as Stunt double
- Kasha Bajor as Agata
- Madelaine Nunn as Daisy
- Gregory J. Fryer as Apari
- Anna Tolputt as Roksana
- Kent Lee as Kong Dang

== Production ==
Waller came up with the idea for the film on Brexit Day, as they'd seen David Dimbleby looking "like he’d just sucked the blood of 15 unborn children. He obviously hadn’t slept. The whole thing was just horrific. I remember all these ghastly narratives of nationalism and the farce of Dominic Cummings – this archdeacon of evil, the Grim Reaper – and Steve Bannon. It all just came suddenly. Everything matched up." He chose to make the film a horror comedy as Waller felt that it was "interesting to explore what we’re willing to laugh at and what we’re not willing to laugh at." Waller wrote the character of Norman with himself in mind.

The film was directed by Jesse O'Brien, director of the 2015 film Arrowhead.

Filming took place over a five week period in Cracow, Queensland during 2018. The town was chosen due to the familiarity of the town and a local pub owner to one of the producers.

== Release ==
Two Heads Creek premiered on Fangoria’s Monster Fest in Melbourne, Australia on 12 October 2019, after which it went on to screen at several film festivals. This was followed by a limited release in Australia through distribution company Entertainment Advocate, which was then newly launched by two of the film's producers, Brett Thornquest and Steven Matusko. The film grossed $14,000 on its opening weekend from both theatre sales and festival screenings. A special screening was held in November 2019 in Cracow, Queensland.

Two Heads Creek was acquired by The Horror Collective for a summer 2020 release and was released via video on demand on 23 June.

== Reception ==
Two Heads Creek has a rating of 90% on Rotten Tomatoes, based on 21 reviews. Commonly discussed elements in the reviews were the movie's political commentary and what CBR.com described as the movie's "generally over-the-top tone". Film Threat and Culture Crypt both wrote mostly favorable reviews, with the latter stating that "Too crass to be considered cute or heartwarming, “Two Heads Creek” still puts a light, bouncy spring in its step. This evens out into a generally pleasing tone that’s consistently whimsical even when the material takes on a darker bent."

The Guardian criticised Two Heads Creek, writing "Walker and Wilder sell it gamely enough – but it’s the sort of movie you need to smoke your body weight in weed to enjoy."
