= Off the Rails (2021 film) =

British comedy-drama film

- Film poster
- Directed by: Jules Williamson
- Written by: Jordan Waller
- Produced by: Bill Kenwright; Arabella Page Croft
- Starring: Kelly Preston; Jenny Seagrove; Sally Phillips; Franco Nero
- Cinematography: Mike Eley
- Edited by: Malcolm Crowe
- Music by: Mario Grigorov
- Production companies: Bill Kenwright Films; Black Camel Pictures
- Distributed by: Screen Media Films
- Release date: 23 July 2021
- Running time: 94 minutes
- Country: United Kingdom
- Language: English

Off the Rails is a 2021 comedy-drama film directed by Jules Williamson, and written by Jordan Waller. The film stars Kelly Preston, Jenny Seagrove, Sally Phillips and Franco Nero.

Three long-time friends in their 50s embark on a European train adventure to relive a trip many years earlier with their recently deceased friend, Anna Farmer. She left them train tickets on the condition her teenage daughter Maddie join them.

This was the final film appearance for Kelly Preston before her death in 2020 and the film is dedicated to her memory.

The film premiered in London on 22 July 2021 and was released on 23 July in the UK and Ireland.

== Plot ==
Upon getting the news that their friend Anna Farmer has passed, her three longtime friends — the single writer Kate, the married GP Liz and the divorced Hollywood television actress Cassie— reunite at her funeral. Afterwards, her devastated mother Diana hands them an envelope containing four Eurrail tickets with a note, asking them to go for her to see a once-a-year natural phenomena in Palma with her teenaged daughter Maddie and again explore Europe.

With their backpacks, the over-50 group embarks on their European train adventure to relive a trip of many years earlier. Arriving in Paris, they stay in the same hostel, which is run-down. Continuing to try to retrace their steps, which the meticulous Liz has mapped out, the financially-strapped Kate snaps at the more affluent Cassie for gifting them dresses the rest could not afford from a boutique. An upset Maddie heads back to the hostel, as she feels the trip is not the same without her mum.

Heading out by train in the morning towards Barcelona, they stop in Gerona for a folk festival. There, they accidentally break a glass table. Taken to the police station, Cassie unintentionally irritates an officer, who starts to cuff her. Luckily, his fellow officer is a fan of her soap opera character, so they are let go after they take some selfies with her.

Stopping for a drink at a place Maddie found online, soon after sitting, the guitarist there Colin approaches Kate. The teen got the writer matched up on a dating app. The three try to leave Kate alone with Colin, but she dissuades him. Maddie points out he must know places to go out, so Cassie calls him over to guide them.

Initially, Kate is cautious around Colin. He opens up to her, explaining he used to work in insurance, but decided to hit the road as a guitarist once his daughter was grown and he went through a divorce. Maddie gets them to sing a duet together. Colin lets Kate know he will be working in Barcelona for the next weeks. They share a tender moment as he kisses her cheek and accepts his phone number. Then the four women head to the rail station.

The group fall asleep on the train, missing their Barcelona stop and waking in Italy. As they have lost Liz's fanny pack with their passports and money, they have to take smaller, regional trains to get back on track.

Their train temporarily breaks down. So, while they are waiting for it to be repaired, Cassie and Liz help an Italian girl give birth. Afterwards, as Maddie has befriended local Angelo, the group is invited to his village to celebrate the birth. As the couple does not agree on a name, the group suggests Ana.

Cassie dances with the baby's grandfather Giovanni, the mayor. They later have sex while spending the night together. Maddie is happy to share a kiss with Angelo. Cassie arrives late for the train. When she does not apologize, Kate again brings up an old fight they had over a man. Cassie forces her to tell Liz about the call she had made to her husband John, as it was answered by another woman.

It comes to light that Kate had slept with Cassie's husband Steven. Everyone gets upset, leaving the station. Eventually, the three old friends reconvene near the train station. Realizing Maddie has likely headed on to Palma without them, Giovanni gets his pilot to fly them to Barcelona. There, Colin loans the group his motorcycle with sidecar to reach the ferry.

Missing the ferry, they steal a boat. On their way, Cassie explains that the letters she had between Kate and Steve are the evidence she needs to keep custody of their son Clay. The friends make up, then they arrive at Palma Cathedral in time to reunite with Maddie and see the Candlemas light show, the unique phenomena occurring only twice a year in which sunlight projects through one of its rose windows to the opposite wall, directly below the other, calling it "God's disco ball." Kate imagines seeing Anna smiling at them.

Lastly, they take the sample of Anna's ashes, each throwing a bit into the ocean at her favorite beach. Then, they run into the sea together.

== Cast ==
- Kelly Preston as Cassie Blakeley
- Jenny Seagrove as Kate Fisher
- Sally Phillips as Liz
- Elizabeth Dormer-Phillips as Maddie
- Ben Miller as Dan
- Franco Nero as Giovanni
- Judi Dench as Diana
- Peter Bowles as Vicar

== Production ==
The film was announced in February 2019. Filming began that same month, and would film between Mallorca, Barcelona and London. Scenes were also filmed in France.

== Reception ==
On the review aggregator website Rotten Tomatoes, the film has an approval rating of 35% based on 23 reviews, with an average rating of 4.9/10. The website's consensus reads, "It has a talented cast and an entertaining soundtrack, but the limp and predictable Off the Rails lives down to its title in the most disappointing ways."
