= Kelly Preston =

American actress (1962–2020)

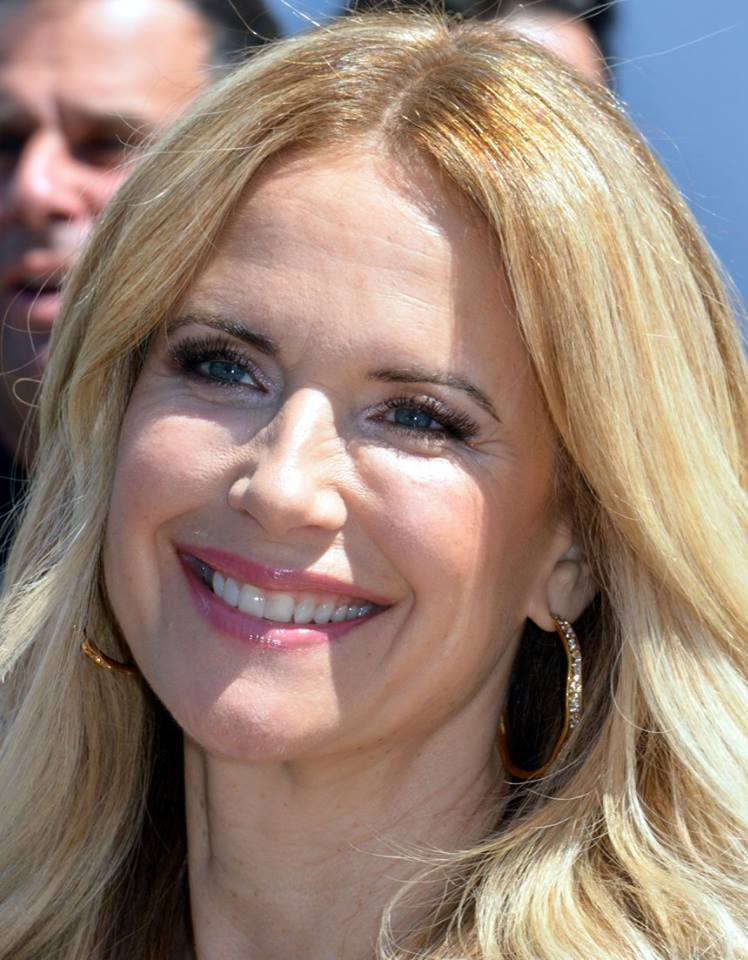
- Preston at the 2018 Cannes Film Festival
- Born: Kelly Kamalelehua Smith; October 13, 1962; Honolulu, Hawaii, U.S.
- Died: July 12, 2020 (aged 57); Clearwater, Florida, U.S.
- Education: University of Southern California
- Occupation: Actress
- Years active: 1980–2020
- Spouses: Kevin Gage (m. 1985; div. 1987); John Travolta (m. 1991)
- Children: 3
- Website: kellypreston.com

Kelly Kamalelehua Smith (October 13, 1962 – July 12, 2020), known professionally as Kelly Preston, was an American actress. She appeared in more than 60 television and film productions, including Mischief (1985), Twins (1988), Jerry Maguire (1996), and For Love of the Game (1999). She married John Travolta in 1991, and collaborated with him on the comedy film The Experts (1989) and the biographical film Gotti (2018). She also starred in the films SpaceCamp (1986), The Cat in the Hat (2003), What a Girl Wants (2003), Sky High (2005), and Old Dogs (2009).

== Early life ==
Kelly Kamalelehua Smith ("Kelly" is a name of Celtic origin, and the middle name "Kamalelehua" means "garden of lehuas" in Hawaiian) was born in Honolulu, Hawaii. Her mother, Linda, was an administrator of a mental health center. Her father, who worked for an agricultural firm, drowned when she was four years old. Her mother subsequently married Peter Palzis, a personnel director. He adopted her, and she used his name at the start of her acting career. She also had a younger half-brother, Chris Palzis.

As a child, she lived in Iraq, and also Australia, where she attended Pembroke School, Adelaide. She then attended Punahou School in Honolulu, graduating in 1980, and studied drama and theater at the University of Southern California.

== Career ==
While living in Australia, she was discovered at age 16 by a fashion photographer who helped her get work in commercials and other small parts. He arranged her first film audition for the role of Emmeline in The Blue Lagoon (1980), which she lost to the younger Brooke Shields. At that time she changed her last name to Preston.

Her first prominent film roles came in 1985—first as Marilyn McCauley in the romantic teen flick comedy Mischief; then as the beautiful but shallow Deborah Ann Fimple in another teen romantic comedy, Secret Admirer. Her other roles included SpaceCamp (1986), Twins (1988) with Arnold Schwarzenegger and Danny DeVito, Avery Bishop in Jerry Maguire (1996) with Tom Cruise, Jane Aubrey in For Love of the Game with Kevin Costner and Kate Newell, and in Holy Man (1998) with Eddie Murphy and Jeff Goldblum. In 1997, she starred in Nothing to Lose, which co-starred Tim Robbins and Martin Lawrence. She also starred in the movie Jack Frost (1998).

She played the girlfriend of her husband John Travolta's character Terl in the film Battlefield Earth, for which she received "Worst Supporting Actress" at the 21st Golden Raspberry Awards. She appeared as the protagonist's flying, superhero mother in the film Sky High (2005).

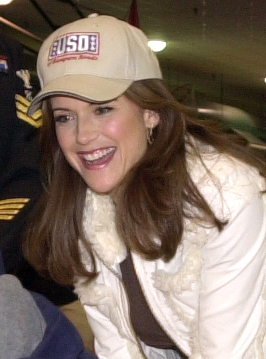
Preston in 2005

In 2004, she was in the Maroon 5 music video "She Will Be Loved", which featured a love triangle and romantic scenes between her and Maroon 5 front man Adam Levine. She appeared in the crime thriller Death Sentence (2007), in which she played Helen Hume, the wife of Kevin Bacon's character Nick. In 2008, she was cast in a television pilot called Suburban Shootout, and had a short term recurring role in Medium.

She starred in the Lifetime television film The Tenth Circle (2008), directed by Peter Markle. It was shot in Nova Scotia and featured Ron Eldard, Britt Robertson, Michael Riley, Jamie Johnston and Geordie Brown.

She was a spokeswoman for Neutrogena, appearing in its print and television ads.

Her final red carpet appearance came at the New York City premiere of her husband's motion picture Gotti in 2018.

Her final film role was in the comedy-drama Off the Rails, which was released in late July 2021 in the UK.

== Personal life ==
Preston was married to actor Kevin Gage from 1985 until their divorce in 1987. She also had a relationship with George Clooney in the late 1980s.

Preston was briefly engaged to Charlie Sheen in 1990, but ended the relationship shortly after an accidental gun discharge left shrapnel in her body. In a 2011 interview with TMZ, Preston said that Sheen did not shoot her.

Preston met John Travolta in 1987 while filming The Experts. They married in 1991, traveling to Paris on an Air France Concorde for a wedding ceremony at the Hotel de Crillon (on the Place de la Concorde) on September 5, 1991. However, a second ceremony was required because the first, performed by a French Scientology minister (both Preston and Travolta were Scientologists), was considered invalid. The second ceremony took place on September 12, 1991, in Daytona Beach, Florida. Preston and Travolta had three children: son Jett, daughter Ella Bleu, and a second son, Benjamin. Preston remained a Scientologist until her death.

=== Death of Jett Travolta ===
Preston's son Jett Travolta was described as suffering from Kawasaki disease as an infant and had a history of seizures. In 2003, Preston appeared on The Montel Williams Show to promote L. Ron Hubbard's Purification Rundown, which she credited with helping her son.

On January 2, 2009, Jett Travolta died at the age of 16 while the family was vacationing in the Bahamas. His death was attributed to a seizure.

On January 23, 2009, three people were arrested in the Bahamas in connection with a multimillion-dollar extortion plot against Travolta and Preston concerning the circumstances of their son's death. One of the men, Obie Wilchcombe, a member of the Bahamian Parliament and former Bahamian Minister of Tourism, was described as a "close friend" of Travolta and Preston. Two others allegedly involved were an EMT named Tarino Lightbourne and a Bahamian senator named Pleasant Bridgewater. Bridgewater was charged with abetment to extort and conspiracy to extort and resigned from the Senate as a result of the allegations. Travolta and Preston confirmed longstanding speculations when they testified that their son had autism and suffered regular seizures. The first trial ended in a mistrial.

After a second jury had been selected, the Travoltas elected to drop the case and all charges against the defendants were dismissed.

== Death ==
On July 12, 2020, Preston died at the age of 57 at her home in Clearwater, Florida, two years after she had been diagnosed with breast cancer. Her diagnosis was not widely publicized. Preston had been receiving treatment at the MD Anderson Cancer Center in Houston, and had also been treated at other medical centers. Her husband, John Travolta, announced her death on his Instagram account.

== Filmography ==
=== Film ===
Year	Title	Role	Notes	Ref.
1983	10 to Midnight	Doreen		
1983	Metalstorm: The Destruction of Jared-Syn	Dhyana		
1983	Christine	Roseanne		
1985	Mischief	Marilyn McCauley		
1985	Secret Admirer	Deborah Anne Fimple		
1986	SpaceCamp	Tish Ambrosé		
1986	52 Pick-Up	Cynthia "Cini" Frazier		
1987	Love at Stake	Sara Lee		
1987	A Tiger's Tale	Shirley Butts		
1987	Amazon Women on the Moon	Violet	Segment: "Titan Man"	
1988	Spellbinder	Miranda Reed		
1988	Twins	Marnie Mason		
1989	The Experts	Bonnie		
1991	Run	Karen Landers		
1992	Only You	Amanda Hughes		
1994	Double Cross	Vera Blanchard	Video	
1994	Love Is a Gun	Jean Starr		
1995	Mrs. Munck	Young Rose Munck		
1995	Waiting to Exhale	Kathleen	Uncredited cameo	
1996	Citizen Ruth	Rachel		
1996	From Dusk till Dawn	Kelly Houge, Newscaster		
1996	Curdled	Kelly Hogue		
1996	Jerry Maguire	Avery Bishop		
1997	Addicted to Love	Linda		
1997	Nothing to Lose	Ann Beam		
1998	Holy Man	Kate Newell		
1998	Jack Frost	Gabby Frost		
1999	For Love of the Game	Jane Aubrey		
2000	Battlefield Earth	Chirk		
2001	Daddy and Them	Rose		
2003	View from the Top	Sherry		
2003	What a Girl Wants	Libby Reynolds		
2003	The Cat in the Hat	Joan Walden		
2004	Eulogy	Lucy Collins		
2004	Return to Sender	Susan Kennan		
2005	Sky High	Josie Stronghold / Jetstream		
2006	Broken Bridges	Angela Delton		
2007	Death Sentence	Helen Hume		
2008	Struck	Trista	Short film	
2009	Old Dogs	Vicki Greer		
2010	The Last Song	Kim Miller		
2010	Casino Jack	Pam Abramoff		
2014	Dissonance	Kim	Short film	
2018	Gotti	Victoria Gotti		
2021	Off the Rails	Cassie	Posthumous release	

=== Television ===
Year	Title	Role	Notes	Ref.
1980	Hawaii Five-O	Wendy	Episode: "For Old Times Sake"	
1982	Capitol	Gillian McCandless	Episode: "Pilot"	
1983	Quincy M.E.	Ginger Reeves	Episode: "On Dying High"	
1983	The Renegades	Lisa Primus	Episode: "Back to School"	
1983	CHiPs	Anna	Episode: "Things That Go Creep in the Night"	
1983–1984	For Love and Honor	Mary Lee	Regular role (12 episodes)	
1984	Riptide	Sherry Meyers	Episode: "The Hardcase"	
1984	Blue Thunder	Amy Braddock	Episode: "The Long Flight"	
1990	Tales from the Crypt	Linda	Episode: "The Switch"	
1991	The Perfect Bride	Laura	Television film	
1993	The American Clock	Diana Marley	Television film	
1994	Cheyenne Warrior	Rebecca Carver	Television film	
1996	Little Surprises	Ginger	Short	
2000	Bar Hopping	Bebe	Television film	
2001	Fear Factor	Herself	Episode: "First Celebrity Fear Factor"	
2004	Joey	Donna Di Gregorio	Episodes: "Joey and the Dream Girl: Parts 1 & 2"	
2005	Fat Actress	Quinn Taylor Scott	Recurring role (4 episodes)	
2006	Legends Ball	Herself	Television documentary film	
2008	Medium	Meghan Doyle	Recurring role (4 episodes)	
2008	The Tenth Circle	Laura Stone	Television film	
2010	Kirstie Alley's Big Life	Herself	Episode: "Oh Rats! It's My Birthday!"	
2013	Adopted	Karey	Television film	
2016	CSI: Cyber	Greer Latimore	Recurring role (3 episodes)	

=== Web ===
Year	Title	Role	Notes	Ref.
2013	The Stafford Project	Tabitha	Episode: "White Secret"	

=== Music videos ===
Year	Title	Artist	Role	Ref.
2004	"She Will Be Loved"	Maroon 5	Socialite / Mother	
2006	"Broken"	Lindsey Haun	Angela Delton	

== Awards and nominations ==
Year	Award	Category	Production	Result	Ref.
2001	Golden Raspberry Award	Worst Supporting Actress	Battlefield Earth	Won	
2004	Golden Raspberry Award	Worst Supporting Actress	The Cat in the Hat	Nominated	
2010	Golden Raspberry Award	Worst Supporting Actress	Old Dogs	Nominated	
2019	Golden Raspberry Award	Worst Supporting Actress	Gotti	Nominated	
2019	Golden Raspberry Award	Worst Screen Combo	Gotti	Nominated	
