= Helen Dallimore =

Australian actress (born 1971)

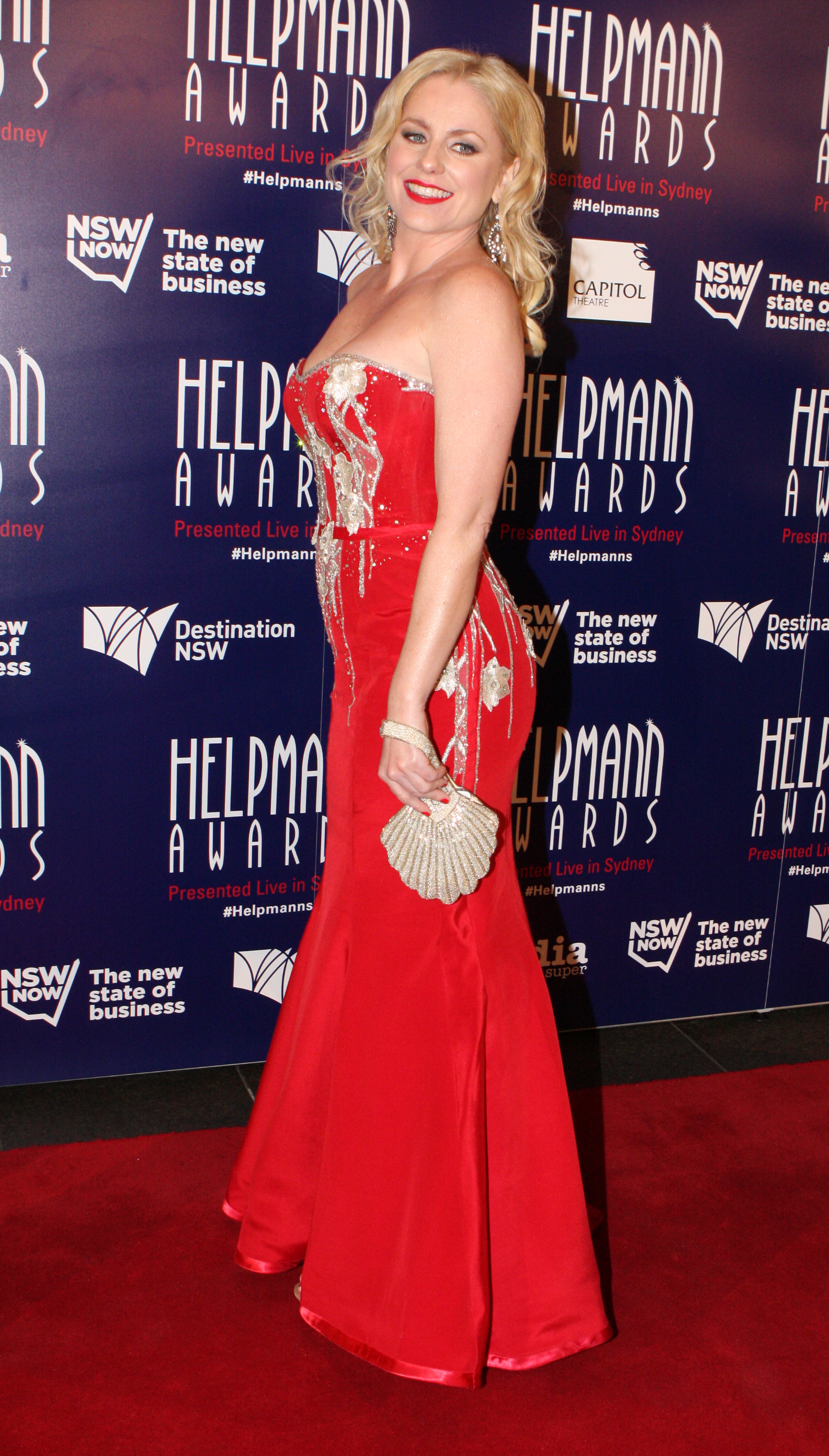
- Dallimore in 2015
- Born: 31 October 1971 (age 54); Melbourne, Victoria, Australia
- Education: National Institute of Dramatic Art
- Occupation: Actress
- Years active: 1996–present
- Spouse: Abe Forsythe (m. 2009; sep. 2013)

Helen Dallimore (born 31 October 1971) is an Australian stage, television and film actress, known for originating the role of Glinda in the West End production of Wicked.

== Early life ==
Dallimore grew up in Oxford, England and Sydney, Australia. She trained at the National Institute of Dramatic Art in Sydney, graduating in 1995. She was awarded a Mike Walsh Fellowship in 2002.

Her parents are academics and she has one brother.

== Career ==
=== Theatre ===
Dallimore's credits with the Sydney Theatre Company include: David Edgar's Pentecost, The Unlikely Prospect of Happiness, Andrew Upton and Gale Edwards' The Hanging Man, and "Miss Adelaide" in Guys and Dolls. She also created the role of "Simone" in Up for Grabs, later played by Madonna in the West End.

She made her West End debut as Glinda in the original London cast of the musical Wicked. Previews began on 7 September 2006 with an opening night of 27 September. She starred alongside Idina Menzel and later Kerry Ellis as Elphaba. She played her final performance on 14 July 2007 and was replaced by Dianne Pilkington. She was asked to reprise the role in the original Australian production of the show but declined.

She then appeared in the comedy Boeing Boeing in Australia and filled in for a sick cast member in the Sydney 2008 Wharf Revue. In July/August 2009 she starred in the ill-fated Ernest Hemingway musical Too Close to the Sun at the West End's Comedy Theatre. She went on to appear in the 2009 Wharf Revue in Sydney, followed by the Australian production of Spring Awakening with the Sydney Theatre Company in February/March 2010.

Dallimore played Cinderella in the London Open Air Theatre production of Into the Woods, which ran from 6 August to 11 September 2010.

In 2012, she originated the role of Paulette Bonafonte in the Australian premiere of Legally Blonde The Musical. For this role, she won the 2013 Helpmann Award for Best Female Actor in a Supporting Role in a Musical.

Dallimore starred as Mrs Johnstone in the Australian revival of Blood Brothers in Sydney and Melbourne, and was nominated for a Helpmann Award for her performance. She would go on to win a Colleen Clifford Memorial Award for Best Actor in a Music Theatre (female) at the 2015 Glug Awards.

In 2019 Dallimore starred as Judy Garland in The State Theatre Company of South Australia production of End of the Rainbow.

=== Film and television ===
Dallimore's film and television work includes Mr. Accident, Mumbo Jumbo, Kangaroo Jack, The Day of the Roses, Two Heads Creek and The Extra. She also featured alongside Glenn Close and Harry Connick Jr. in the 2001 television remake of the Rodgers and Hammerstein musical, South Pacific. She appeared in an episode of the UK television crime drama Midsomer Murders entitled "Last Year's Model".

Dallimore worked for children's television and provided the voice of Panda in the popular children's TV series Magic Mountain for ABC TV. She also appears in the 2009 sketch comedy television series Double Take.

She has also appeared in a series of TV commercials for All-Bran cereal, also featuring fellow actress and comedian Julia Morris.

In the summer of 2010, Dallimore appeared in Home and Away as Mitzy, a friend of Marilyn Chambers.

Since 2018, she has narrated the Australian version of Married at First Sight, taking over from Georgie Gardner since the fifth season.

== Filmography ==
=== Film ===
Year	Title	Role	Notes
1998	The Sugar Factory	Christine	Feature film
1999	Mumbo Jumbo	Jackie	TV movie
2000	Mr. Accident	Sunday Valentine	Feature film
2001	Russian Doll	Alison	Feature film
2002	Tempe Tip	Joy Franklin	Feature film
2000	The Three Stooges	Elaine Ackerman	TV movie
2002	Secret Bridesmaids' Business	Margaret 'Meg' Louise Bacon	TV movie
2003	The Postcard Bandit	Gina	TV movie
2004	It Takes Two to Tango	Cassie	Short film
2005	The Extra	Kylie Crackenrack	Feature film
2005	Little Oberon	Siobhan	TV movie
2009	Being Carl Williams	Journalisf	Short film
2010	Shock	Sarah J	Short film
2016	Fragments of Friday		Film
2017	Remembering Agatha	Hatty Bernstein	Short film
2018	A Suburban Love Story	Cynthia	Feature film
2019	Two Heads Creek	Apple	Feature film

=== Television ===
Year	Title	Role	Notes
1996–97	Pacific Drive	Sondra Westwood	TV series
1996–2000	Water Rats	Fiona / Paula / Katie Wood	TV series, 3 episodes
1997	Flipper	Kate Sheffield	TV series, 1 episode
1997–98	Magic Mountain	Panda (voice)	TV series
1998	The Day of the Roses	Annette Gordon	TV miniseries, 2 episodes
1998–2004	All Saints	Amanda Sales / Loretta Giorgio	TV series, 9 episodes
2001	South Pacific	Nurse	TV miniseries
2002	Bad Cop, Bad Cop	Billie Lovelay	TV series, 1 episode
2006	Midsomer Murders	Felicity	TV series, season 9, episode 8: Last Year's Model
2009	Double Take	Various characters	TV series, 11 episodes
2009	Chandon Pictures	Megan	TV series, 1 episode
2010	Rescue: Special Ops	Yvette Turner	TV series, 1 episode
2010	Home and Away	Mitzy Fraser	TV series, 15 episodes
2012	Laid	Megan	TV series, 1 episode
2012	A Moody Christmas	Peggy	TV miniseries, 4 episodes
2013	The Elegant Gentleman's Guide to Knife Fighting	Special Guest	TV miniseries, 1 episode
2013	In Your Dreams	Jill	TV series, 6 episodes
2013–14	House Husbands	Gaby	TV series, seasons 2-3, 5 episodes
2014	The Moodys	Peggy	TV series, 1 episode
2014	Wonderland	Bianca Deakin	TV series, 2 episodes
2015–present	Married at First Sight	Narrator	TV series, 7 seasons
2016–17	Here Come the Habibs	Olivia O'Neill	TV series, seasons 1-2
2017	True Story with Hamish & Andy	Sammie	TV series, 1 episode
2018	Talkin' 'Bout Your Generation	Self	TV series, 1 episode
2019	Hardball	Ms Crapper / Ms Blapper	TV series, 20 episodes
2023	North Shore	Sarah Skillmam	TV series, 1 episode

== Theatre ==
Year	Title	Role	Notes
2004	The Republic of Myopia		Sydney Theatre Company at Sydney Theatre
2004	Harbour		Sydney Theatre Company at Sydney Theatre. Written by Katherine Thomson
2006	Wicked	Glinda	Apollo Victoria Theatre
2009	Too Close to the Sun	Mary Hemingway	Comedy Theatre, West End
2010	Into the Woods	Cinderella	Regent's Park Open Air Theatre
2012	Legally Blonde	Paulette	Lyric Theatre Sydney
2015	Blood Brothers	Mrs Johnstone	Sydney
2017–18	Muriel's Wedding	Deidre Chambers	Sydney Theatre Company and Global Creatures at Roslyn Packer Theatre
2019	End of the Rainbow	Judy Garland	State Theatre Company of South Australia
2022	Girl from the North Country		Australia & New Zealand tour
