= Kirstie Alley =

American actress (1951–2022)

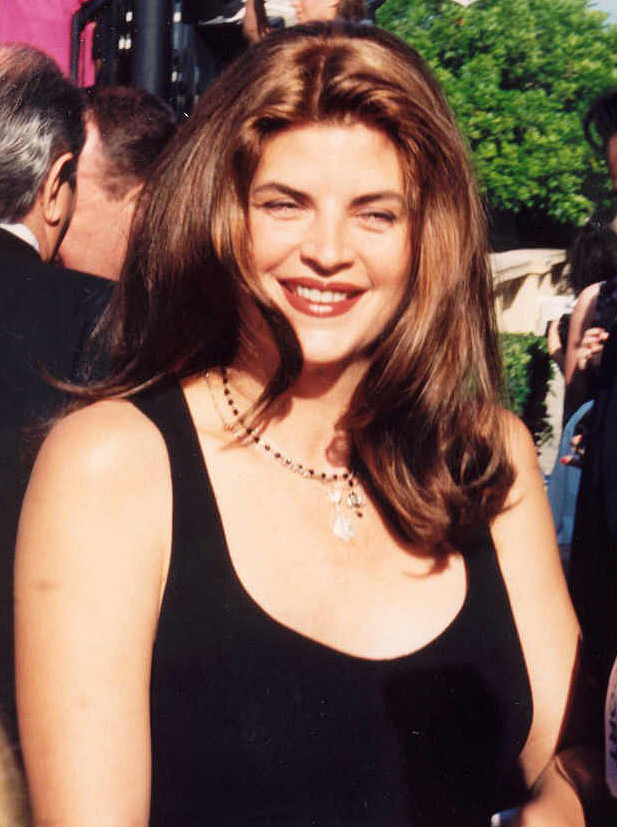
- Alley in 1994
- Born: Kirstie Louise Alley; January 12, 1951; Wichita, Kansas, U.S.
- Died: December 5, 2022 (aged 71); Tampa, Florida, U.S.
- Occupations: Actress; television personality
- Years active: 1978–2022
- Spouses: Bob Alley (m. 1971; div. 1977) Parker Stevenson (m. 1983; div. 1997)
- Children: 2
- Awards: Hollywood Walk of Fame
- Website: kirstiealley.com

Kirstie Louise Alley (January 12, 1951 – December 5, 2022) was an American actress. Her breakthrough role was as Rebecca Howe in the NBC sitcom Cheers (1987–1993), for which she received an Emmy Award and a Golden Globe in 1991. From 1997 to 2000, Alley starred as the lead in the sitcom Veronica's Closet, earning additional Emmy and Golden Globe nominations. On film, she played Mollie Jensen in Look Who's Talking (1989) and its two sequels, Look Who's Talking Too (1990) and Look Who's Talking Now (1993).

Throughout the 1980s and 1990s, Alley appeared in various films, including Star Trek II: The Wrath of Khan (1982), Summer School (1987), Shoot to Kill (1988), Madhouse (1990), Sibling Rivalry (1990), Village of the Damned (1995), It Takes Two (1995), Deconstructing Harry (1997), For Richer or Poorer (1997), and Drop Dead Gorgeous (1999).

Alley won her second Emmy Award in 1994 for the television film David's Mother. In 1997, Alley received another Emmy nomination for her work in the crime drama series The Last Don. In 2005, Alley played a fictionalized version of herself on Showtime's Fat Actress, something she would also do on episodes of King of Queens and Hot in Cleveland, as well as in Syrup (2013). In 2013, Alley returned to acting with the title role on the sitcom Kirstie. In 2016, she appeared on the Fox comedy horror series Scream Queens.

Alley also appeared in reality television including Kirstie Alley's Big Life (2010) and served as a contestant on the 12th season of Dancing with the Stars (2011–2012), where she finished in second place, behind Hines Ward, and the 22nd series of the British reality show Celebrity Big Brother (2018), in which Alley finished as runner-up. In early 2022, she appeared on The Masked Singer.

== Early life and education ==
Kirstie Louise Alley was born in Wichita, Kansas, on January 12, 1951, to Robert Deal Alley, who owned a lumber company, and Lillian Alley. She had two siblings, Colette and Craig.

Alley attended Wichita Southeast High School, where she graduated in 1969. Alley attended college at Kansas State University in Manhattan, Kansas, where she dropped out after completing her sophomore year.

== Career ==
After leaving Kansas State, Alley moved to Los Angeles to pursue Scientology and work as an interior designer. In 1979, she appeared as a contestant on the game show Match Game, winning both her games and went on to win $500 in her first Super Match and $5,500 in her second. In 1980, Alley appeared on the game show Password Plus. On both game shows, she described her profession as interior designer. In 1981, an automobile crash involving a drunk driver killed Alley's mother and left her father seriously injured.

In 1982, Alley made her film debut in Star Trek II: The Wrath of Khan in the role of the Vulcan Starfleet officer Lieutenant Saavik. The Saavik character became very popular with Star Trek fans, but Alley chose not to reprise the role in the next two film sequels so the role was recast.

From 1983 to 1984, Alley was a regular on the ABC television series Masquerade. In the years following, Alley starred in a number of smaller films, including One More Chance, Blind Date and Runaway.

In 1985, Alley starred in the ABC miniseries North and South, and also portrayed feminist icon Gloria Steinem in the television movie A Bunny's Tale. In 1987, Alley starred alongside Mark Harmon in the comedy film Summer School. The film was a box office success, grossing over $35 million in the United States. She followed up with roles in films such as Shoot to Kill (1988), Madhouse (1990), and Sibling Rivalry (1990).

In 1987, Alley joined the cast of the NBC sitcom Cheers, where she played Rebecca Howe. She replaced Shelley Long. Alley remained with the show for six years until its eleventh and final season, and earned an Emmy Award and Golden Globe.

In 1989, Alley starred with John Travolta in Look Who's Talking. The film grossed over $295 million worldwide. They then went on to make two other films centered on the same theme, Look Who's Talking Too (1990) and Look Who's Talking Now (1993). After two Emmy Award nominations for her work on Cheers, in 1988 and 1990, Alley won the Emmy on her third nomination, in 1991. In her acceptance speech, Alley memorably thanked "my husband Parker, the man who has given me the big ones for the last eight years."

Alley earned her second Emmy for the 1994 television film David's Mother. For her contributions to the film industry, Alley received a motion pictures star on the Hollywood Walk of Fame at 7000 Hollywood Boulevard in 1995. Her later films included Village of the Damned (1995), It Takes Two (1995), Deconstructing Harry (1997), For Richer or Poorer (1997), and Drop Dead Gorgeous (1999).

From 1997 to 2000, Alley played the title character and was executive producer in the NBC sitcom Veronica's Closet, where she earned another Emmy and Golden Globe nomination. From 2000 to 2004, she served as a commercial spokesperson for Pier 1 Imports, and for Jenny Craig from 2004 to 2007. In 2005, Alley played a fictionalized version of herself on the show Fat Actress. In 2010, she was in the reality show Kirstie Alley's Big Life. From 2011 to 2012, Alley appeared as a contestant on seasons 12 and 15 of Dancing with the Stars, partnering with Maksim Chmerkovskiy.

Beginning in December 2013, TV Land aired a sitcom that centered on Alley as Broadway star Madison "Maddie" Banks, who reconnects with her adult son whom she gave up for adoption shortly after he was born. The series was titled Kirstie, and reunited her with former Cheers co-star Rhea Perlman and Seinfeld star Michael Richards. The series ran for five months.

In 2018, Alley appeared on season 22 of the British series Celebrity Big Brother; she finished in second place.

In 2019, Alley returned to the game show Match Game, where she was a contestant in 1979, this time as a celebrity panel. Host Alec Baldwin surprised Alley with a clip from the original series. This made her only the second former contestant to return as a panelist. (The first was actress Brianne Leary, who was a contestant in 1976 and a panelist in 1979.)

In 2022, Alley competed in season seven of The Masked Singer as "Baby Mammoth" of Team Cuddly.

== Personal life ==
Alley was married from 1971 to 1977 to her high school sweetheart Robert "Bob" Alley, who coincidentally had the same name as her father. Alley married actor Parker Stevenson on December 22, 1983. After a miscarriage, the couple adopted their first child, a son, William True in October 1992, and in 1995, they adopted their second child, a daughter, Lillie. The marriage ended in 1997. In 2016, Alley became a grandmother through her son.

In 1988 and 2000 respectively, Alley purchased estates in Jacksonville, Oregon, and Clearwater, Florida, retaining ownership of both properties until her death in 2022. From 1991 to 2020, Alley also resided on Islesboro Island, Maine. She once owned the Mitchell Cottage, formerly the Islesboro Inn, with her then-husband Stevenson.

=== Body image ===
On The Dr. Oz Show on September 17, 2012, Alley said that she had started gaining weight in late 2003, and that she had been a compulsive eater all her life without gaining weight, and had only noticed the change after she reached early menopause in 1992.

While working as a Jenny Craig spokesperson from 2004 to 2007, Alley lost 75 pounds (34 kg), bringing her weight down to 145 lb (66 kg). In May 2009, Alley told People magazine that, after parting ways with Craig, she gained 83 lb (38 kg) and weighed as much as 228 lb (103 kg).

In March 2010, after gossip blogger Roger Friedman alleged a link between her Organic Liaison weight-loss system and the Church of Scientology, Alley denied it on the Today show. In September 2011, Alley announced that she had lost 100 lb (45 kg) using weight loss products from Organic Liaison. In 2012, Alley faced a class-action lawsuit alleging false advertising; the suit claimed that her weight loss was the result of exercise, including training for the TV show Dancing with the Stars, not Organic Liaison products. Alley settled the suit in 2013, agreeing to remove the term "Proven Products" from packaging, issue a disclaimer on the brand's website that it is a "calorie-based weight-loss product", and pay a $130,000 settlement.

In April 2014, Alley resumed a role as a spokeswoman with Jenny Craig; the Organic Liaison product line was acquired by Jenny Craig's parent company, and subsequently integrated into Jenny Craig's product line. In January 2015, Alley said that, since starting the Jenny Craig weight-loss program again, she had lost 50 lb (23 kg).

=== Scientology ===
Alley was raised as a Methodist. She became a member of the Church of Scientology in 1979. Alley said that until she became a Scientologist, she was addicted to cocaine but then went through Narconon, a Scientology-affiliated drug treatment program to end her addiction. By 2007, the Church had designated Alley as OT VII (Operating Thetan Level 7), and by 2018, as New OT VIII. In January 2008, Alley said, "Scientology made me a lot stronger and tougher [...] It's made me more honest and more willing to take responsibility for other people." Alley gave $5 million to the church in 2007.

Due to her commitment to the Church of Scientology, Alley decided not to reprise her role as Rebecca Howe on any episode of the Cheers spinoff Frasier because the lead character in the series is a psychiatrist, and the Church rejects the tenets of psychiatry. Alley was the only former Cheers regular to do so.

=== Politics ===
Alley said she supported both Democratic and Republican presidential nominees and independent Ross Perot in 1992, but decided not to vote in 1988 and 2004. In August 2015, Alley tweeted that she would not support Hillary Clinton, the Democratic nominee, during the 2016 presidential election, and on April 8, 2016, Alley tweeted her support for Republican presidential candidates Donald Trump and Rudy Giuliani. On October 8, 2016, Alley retracted her endorsement of Trump, tweeting, "I hate this election and I'm officially no longer endorsing either candidate."

In October 2020, Alley said that she had voted for Trump four years earlier and intended to vote for him again in 2020 because "he's NOT a politician." She also endorsed Republican John James in the 2020 U.S. Senate election in Michigan.

== Illness and death ==
In May 2022, Alley was diagnosed with stage 4 colon cancer, following a doctor’s visit for a sore back. She subsequently underwent chemotherapy at Moffitt Cancer Center in Tampa, Florida, where she died on December 5 at age 71.

Several celebrities posted tributes to Alley on social media or released memorial statements, including Alley's ex-husband Parker Stevenson, her two children, her Look Who's Talking co-star John Travolta, and her Cheers co-stars Ted Danson, Kelsey Grammer, and Rhea Perlman.

== Filmography ==
=== Film ===
List of performances by Kirstie Alley in film
Year	Title	Role	Notes
1981	One More Chance	Sheila	
1982	Star Trek II: The Wrath of Khan	Saavik	
1984	Champions	Barbara	
1984	Blind Date	Claire Simpson	
1984	Runaway	Jackie Rogers	
1987	Summer School	Ms. Robin Elizabeth Bishop	
1988	She's Having a Baby	Herself	Uncredited
1988	Shoot to Kill	Sarah Rennell	
1989	Loverboy	Dr. Joyce Palmer	
1989	Look Who's Talking	Mollie Jensen	
1990	Madhouse	Jessie Bannister	
1990	Sibling Rivalry	Marjorie Turner	
1990	Look Who's Talking Too	Mollie Jensen Ubriacco	
1993	Look Who's Talking Now	Mollie Jensen Ubriacco	
1995	Village of the Damned	Dr. Susan Verner	
1995	It Takes Two	Diane Barrows	
1996	Sticks & Stones	Joey's mother	
1997	Nevada	McGill	Also co-producer
1997	Deconstructing Harry	Joan	
1997	For Richer or Poorer	Caroline Sexton	
1999	The Mao Game	Diane Highland	
1999	Drop Dead Gorgeous	Gladys Leeman	
2004	Back by Midnight	Gloria Beaumont	
2013	Syrup	Herself	
2015	Accidental Love	Aunt Rita	

=== Television ===
List of performances by Kirstie Alley in television
Year	Title	Role	Notes
1978	Quark	Handmaiden (uncredited)	Episode: "The Old and the Beautiful"
1979	Match Game	Herself, contestant	3 episodes
1980	Password Plus	Herself	1 episode
1983	Highway Honeys	Draggin' Lady	Television film
1983	The Love Boat	Marion Stevens	Episode: "The World's Greatest Kisser/Don't Take My Wife, Please/The Reluctant Father"
1983–1984	Masquerade	Casey Collins	Main cast
1984	Sins of the Past	Patrice Cantwell	Television film
1985	A Bunny's Tale	Gloria Steinem	Television film
1985–1986	North and South	Virgilia Hazard	Miniseries; main cast
1985–1987	The Hitchhiker	Jane L. Angelica	2 episodes
1986	Prince of Bel Air	Jamie Harrison	Television film
1986	Stark: Mirror Image	Maggie Carter	Television film
1987–1993	Cheers	Rebecca Howe	Series regular – 148 episodes
1987	Infidelity	Ellie Denato	Television film
1988	Mickey's 60th Birthday	Rebecca Howe	Television film
1990	Masquerade: The Movie	Casey Collins	Television film
1991–1993	Saturday Night Live	Herself / host	2 episodes
1991	Flesh 'n' Blood	Starr Baxter	Episode: "Arlo and Starr"
1992	My Name Is Prince	Vanessa Bartholomew	Music video
1993	Wings	Rebecca Howe	Episode: "I Love Brian"
1994	David's Mother	Sally Goodson	Television film
1995	Peter and the Wolf	Annie/Bird/Duck (voice)	Television film
1996	Radiant City	Gloria Goodman	Television film
1996	Suddenly	Marty Doyle	Television film; also writer
1997–2000	Veronica's Closet	Veronica Chase	Series regular; also producer
1997	Ink	Dahlia	Episode: "Breaking the Rules"
1997	Toothless	Dr. Katherine Lewis	Television film
1997	The Last Don	Rose Marie Clericuzio	Miniseries; main cast
1998	The Last Don II	Rose Marie Clericuzio	Miniseries; main cast
2001	Blonde	Elsie	Miniseries; main cast
2001	Dharma & Greg	Dr. Tish (uncredited)	Episode: "The End of the Innocence: Part 1"
2002	Glory Days	Mike's Agent	Unaired pilot
2003	Salem Witch Trials	Ann Putnam	Television film
2003	Profoundly Normal	Donna Lee Shelby Thornton	Television film; also executive producer
2004	Without a Trace	Noreen Raab	Episode: "Risen"
2004	Family Sins	Brenda Geck	Television film
2004	While I Was Gone	Jo Beckett	Television film
2005	Fat Actress	Kirstie Alley	Series regular; also writer / executive producer
2006	The King of Queens	Kirstie Alley	Episode: "Apartment Complex"
2007	Write & Wrong	Byrdie Langdon	Television film; also executive producer
2007	The Minister of Divine	Sydney Hudson	Pilot Episode
2008	The Hills	Herself	Episode: "Girls Night Out"
2010	Kirstie Alley's Big Life	Herself	Series regular; also executive producer
2011–2012	Dancing with the Stars	Herself	34 episodes; contestant
2012	The Manzanis	Angela	Television film
2013	Baby Sellers	Carla Huxley	Television film
2013–2014	Kirstie	Maddie Banks	Series regular; also executive producer
2013–2014	Hot in Cleveland	Maddie Banks / Kirstie Alley	2 episodes
2015	The Middle	Pam Staggs	Episode: "Pam Freakin' Staggs"
2015	Time Crashers	Herself	Main cast (season 1)
2016	Flaked	Jackie	Episode: "Palms"
2016	Scream Queens	Nurse Ingrid M. Hoffel (née Bean) / The Green Meanie #4	Main cast (season 2)
2018	Celebrity Big Brother 22	Herself	Runner-up; housemate
2019	The Goldbergs	Janice Bartlett	Episode: "Food in a Geoffy"
2019	Match Game	Herself, panelist	1 episode
2020	You Can't Take My Daughter	Suzanne	Television film
2022	The Masked Singer	Herself/Baby Mammoth	Season 7 contestant; Eliminated in eighth episode of season 7

== Awards and nominations ==
Alley's work was honored by multiple associations throughout her career. For her role in the sitcom Cheers, she earned four Golden Globe Award nominations, winning once for Best Actress – Television Series Musical or Comedy in 1991; and five Primetime Emmy Award nominations, winning one for Outstanding Lead Actress in a Comedy Series in 1991. She won an additional Emmy for her role in the television film, David's Mother (1994).

On November 10, 1995, Alley was given a star on the Hollywood Walk of Fame for her contributions to motion pictures.

List of awards nominated for or won by Kirstie Alley for acting performances
Year	Association	Category	Title	Result	Ref.
1989	American Comedy Awards	Funniest Female Performer in a Television Series	Cheers	Nominated	
1990	American Comedy Awards	Funniest Female Performer in a Television Series	Cheers	Nominated	
1990	American Comedy Awards	Funniest Actress in a Motion Picture	Look Who's Talking	Nominated	
1991	American Comedy Awards	Funniest Female Performer in a Television Series	Cheers	Nominated	
1998	American Comedy Awards	Funniest Female Performer in a Television Series	Veronica's Closet	Nominated	
1993	American Television Awards	Best Actress in a Situation Comedy	Cheers	Nominated	
1990	Bravo Otto Awards	Best Actress	Look Who's Talking	Nominated	
1991	Bravo Otto Awards	Best Actress	Look Who's Talking Too	Nominated	
1987	CableACE Awards	Actress in a Dramatic Series	The Hitchhiker	Nominated	
1988	CableACE Awards	Actress in a Dramatic Series	The Hitchhiker	Nominated	
1990	Golden Globe Awards	Best Actress in a Television Series – Comedy or Musical	Cheers	Nominated	
1991	Golden Globe Awards	Best Actress in a Television Series – Comedy or Musical	Cheers	Won	
1992	Golden Globe Awards	Best Actress in a Television Series – Comedy or Musical	Cheers	Nominated	
1993	Golden Globe Awards	Best Actress in a Television Series – Comedy or Musical	Cheers	Nominated	
1995	Golden Globe Awards	Best Actress in a Miniseries or Motion Picture Made for Television	David's Mother	Nominated	
1998	Golden Globe Awards	Best Actress in a Television Series – Comedy or Musical	Veronica's Closet	Nominated	
1990	Nickelodeon Kids' Choice Awards	Favorite Movie Actress	Look Who's Talking	Nominated	
1991	Nickelodeon Kids' Choice Awards	Favorite Movie Actress	Look Who's Talking Too	Nominated	
1991	Nickelodeon Kids' Choice Awards	Favorite Television Actress	Cheers	Nominated	
1996	Nickelodeon Kids' Choice Awards	Favorite Movie Actress	It Takes Two	Nominated	
1998	Nickelodeon Kids' Choice Awards	Favorite Television Actress	Veronica's Closet	Nominated	
1988	People's Choice Awards	Favorite Female Television Performer	Cheers	Nominated	
1990	People's Choice Awards	Favorite Female Television Performer	Cheers	Nominated	
1991	People's Choice Awards	Favorite Female Television Performer	Cheers	Won	
1992	People's Choice Awards	Favorite Female Television Performer	Cheers	Nominated	
1993	People's Choice Awards	Favorite Female Television Performer	Cheers	Nominated	
1998	People's Choice Awards	Favorite Female Performer in a New Television Series	Veronica's Closet	Won	
1988	Primetime Emmy Awards	Outstanding Lead Actress in a Comedy Series	Cheers	Nominated	
1990	Primetime Emmy Awards	Outstanding Lead Actress in a Comedy Series	Cheers	Nominated	
1991	Primetime Emmy Awards	Outstanding Lead Actress in a Comedy Series	Cheers	Won	
1992	Primetime Emmy Awards	Outstanding Lead Actress in a Comedy Series	Cheers	Nominated	
1993	Primetime Emmy Awards	Outstanding Lead Actress in a Comedy Series	Cheers	Nominated	
1994	Primetime Emmy Awards	Outstanding Lead Actress in a Miniseries or a Special	David's Mother	Won	
1997	Primetime Emmy Awards	Outstanding Supporting Actress in a Miniseries or a Special	The Last Don	Nominated	
1998	Primetime Emmy Awards	Outstanding Lead Actress in a Comedy Series	Veronica's Closet	Nominated	
1997	Satellite Awards	Best Actress in a Miniseries or Motion Picture Made for Television	Suddenly	Nominated	
1983	Saturn Awards	Best Supporting Actress	Star Trek II: The Wrath of Khan	Nominated	
1985	Saturn Awards	Best Supporting Actress	Runaway	Nominated	
1998	Screen Actors Guild Awards	Outstanding Performance by a Female Actor in a Comedy Series	Veronica's Closet	Nominated	
1997	The Stinkers Bad Movie Awards	Worst On-Screen Couple (shared with Tim Allen)	For Richer or Poorer	Nominated	
1999	The Stinkers Bad Movie Awards	Worst Supporting Actress	Drop Dead Gorgeous	Nominated	
1990	Viewers for Quality Television Awards	Best Actress in a Quality Comedy Series	Cheers	Nominated	
1991	Viewers for Quality Television Awards	Best Actress in a Quality Comedy Series	Cheers	Nominated	
1992	Viewers for Quality Television Awards	Best Actress in a Quality Comedy Series	Cheers	Nominated	

== See also ==
- List of stars on the Hollywood Walk of Fame
