= Lux Cassidy =

- Life Unexpected character
- Portrayed by: Britt Robertson and Megan Charpentier (young)
- First appearance: "Pilot" (episode 1.01)
- Last appearance: "Affair Remembered" (episode 2.13)
- Created by: Liz Tigelaar
In-universe information
- Occupation: Student
- Family: Nate Bazile (father); Cate Cassidy (mother); Jack Bazile (paternal grandfather); Ellen Bazile (paternal grandmother); Grant Cassidy (maternal grandfather); Laverne Cassidy (maternal grandmother); Abby Cassidy (maternal aunt)

Lux Cassidy is a fictional character and one of the protagonists of the CW television series Life Unexpected. She is portrayed by Britt Robertson. The result of a teenage pregnancy, her mother gave her up for adoption. However, she has a heart problem, meaning that she was never adopted and was entered into the foster care system, unknown to Cate who was told that her baby would be adopted. Lux was reunited with her birth parents whilst applying for emancipation.

== Storylines ==
Lux Cassidy was born in Summer of 1993 as the result of a one-night stand between her parents, Cate Cassidy and Nate Bazile during their winter formal when they were teenagers. After she was born, Cate put her up for adoption on the advice of her mother, with Nate believing Cate had an abortion. Lux was born with a congenital heart defect and spent the first few years of her life in hospital due to various surgeries she needed. She received her name from a nurse during one of her stays in hospital, Lux being the Latin word for Light. By the time she was proclaimed healthy at the age of three, Lux was never adopted and was placed in foster care. For several years thereafter, she was either fostered out (with the people only doing it for the state check, none of them caring for Lux at all) or living in a place called Sunnyvale.

In season one, Lux's character was introduced at the age of 15-16 years old. She tracks down her birth parents Cate Cassidy and Nate Bazzle in order to get them to relinquish their legal rights so she can get emancipated from foster care. Sadly, Lux is refused emancipation by the court and is instead placed into the custody of Nate (Baze) and Cate temporarily. She moves into Cate's home because she has the more suitable home and job. Cate and her fiancé, Ryan Thomas, who worked with her as morning drive time radio disc jockeys, make up their attic to become her bedroom.

Despite signing the papers relinquishing his parental rights, Baze instantly bonds with the daughter he had never known he had; while Cate is reluctant to commit to her (due to her own ongoing issues with her estranged parents). Ryan also bonds with Lux and is also sometimes able to get to the heart of his issues better than her own parents, due to the similarities of their issues (although at times, Lux saw him as a threat to the idea of a happy family she dreams of).

During a family dinner, Lux meets her paternal grandparent. It took time for her to bond with Jack, but she does end up calling him "Gramps".

Eventually, Baze and Cate are granted permanent custody, thanks to the aid of Lux's social worker. Cate decides to marry Ryan after withhold due to mixed feelings about marriage and Baze. (the marriage is later annulled in the second season, upon discovering that Ryan had cheated on Cate with his ex-girlfriend, Julia, who he has a son with). Lux is transferred out of Longfellow High, the school she had been attending, and is transferred to Westmonte High School, where her parents attended (and where her dad's friend, Math works as a teacher). In the beginning of season one, Cate pulled Lux out of Longfellow due to a gang fight that had occurred there. Lux, nonetheless, gets used to the school and makes new friends.

Baze owns a bar in season one until it burns down in the season two premiere. Nate aka Baze later starts to work at his father's company and ends up meeting a woman named Emma. They started to date, knowing about the company's policy against dating co-workers. Baze soon finds out that she has a son from a previous marriage, leaving things more complicated than expected. During Thanksgiving, Baze's dad, also the owner of the company, finds out about Baze dating Emma and forces him to choose between Emma or his job. Later in the episode, we find out that Emma had slept with Nate's father in the past. Baze lives with his roommate, Math, who was his childhood best friend. Math retains a place in Lux and Baze's life when he later marries Lux's mom's best friend, Alice, who produces the radio show that Cate and Ryan host.

In season two, Bug asks Lux to marry him, but she turns him down. Bug then angrily breaks up with her and leaves Portland for good. (Upon Lux telling Baze what happened, he consoles his daughter. Lux then begins a secret relationship with Eric Daniels, a man she meets at the Open Bar, which her father operates and later owns, who is later revealed to be a teacher at Westmonte).

Lux is diagnosed with dysgraphia, due to a stroke she suffered when she was a preteen, due to her heart issues. Her past was also shown that she had been sexually and physically abused by a former foster father. His wife, Valerie, lied about it to protect him and not Lux. This revelation angers Baze and his dad, who assaults Trey, the abuser.

Eventually, Lux's relationship with Eric is revealed by Emma's son, Sam (Sam had been blackmailing Lux to hopefully get a higher grade in English). He is ordered to quit his job as a teacher and is told to immediately leave Portland on Cate and Baze's orders, punctuating their order by saying they would have him arrested if he tried to contact their daughter ever again. Cate later wants to know what happened between them and why Eric was so important to Lux.

Baze finds out that Cate had miscarried her baby with Ryan, discovering that Lux will be the only child that Cate will ever have. This news finally allows Cate and Lux (who had been distant up to that time) to establish a true mother-daughter bond, and she realizes that Cate loves her dearly and will not allow her to be hurt or lonely. Lux also gets her drivers license and shares that joy with her father, Baze and also with Ryan, Math and Jamie. At this moment Lux thanks her dad for a lot of good things that happen in her life since she met him and apologizes for telling him about Emma. Baze replies that he could lose anyone in this world except her where they hug.

The final scene of the series takes place two years in the future and shows Lux giving the valedictorian speech at her graduation. She and Jones, who loved her from the first time she set foot at Westmonte High are dating. She graduates with her best friend, Tasha Siviac, whom she has known since they were kids in the foster care system. She has a close bond with her paternal grandparents who attend her graduation. Jamie, Fern, Math, and Alice are also in attendance. They are finally the happy family that they and Lux wanted to be.

== Conception and casting ==
Creator Liz Tigelaar came across the name Lux while reading the novel The Virgin Suicides. Tigelaar used the name in a pilot she wrote which did not get picked up. She then decided to use the name for Life Unexpected. Britt Robertson was cast as Lux in December 2008.
