= Kathryn Wilder =

English stage and film actress

Kathryn Wilder is an English stage and film actress known for her roles in the films Two Heads Creek and All is True.

== Select filmography ==
=== Film ===
- All Is True (2018, as Judith Shakespeare)
- Two Heads Creek (2019, as Anna)

=== Television ===
- Frontier (2017-2018, 11 episodes, as Chaulk)
- Call the Midwife (2021, 1 episode, as Audrey Fleming)
- True Detective (2024, as Blair Hartman)

=== Stage ===
- Romeo and Juliet (2016, as Peta)
- Hamlet (2017, as Ophelia)
