= Life Unexpected =

American drama series

- Intertitle
- Also known as: Light Years; LUX
- Genre: Teen drama
- Created by: Liz Tigelaar
- Starring: Britt Robertson; Shiri Appleby; Kristoffer Polaha; Austin Basis; Kerr Smith; Arielle Kebbel
- Opening theme: "Beautiful Tree" by Rain Perry
- Composers: David Baerwald; Pieter A. Schlosser
- Country of origin: United States
- Original language: English
- No. of seasons: 2
- No. of episodes: 26

Production
- Executive producers: Liz Tigelaar; Gary Fleder; Janet Leahy
- Production locations: Vancouver, British Columbia, Canada
- Running time: 42 minutes
- Production companies: Best Day Ever Productions; Mojo Films; Warner Bros. Television; CBS Productions

Original release
- Network: The CW
- Release: January 18, 2010 – January 18, 2011

Life Unexpected is an American teen drama television series that aired for two seasons from January 18, 2010 to January 18, 2011. It was produced by Best Day Ever Productions and Mojo Films in association with CBS Productions and Warner Bros. Television and broadcast by The CW. Created by Liz Tigelaar, who served as an executive producer with Gary Fleder and Janet Leahy, the series stars Britt Robertson, Shiri Appleby, Kristoffer Polaha, and Kerr Smith.

Set in Portland, the story follows Lux Cassidy, a teenager who was given up at birth and has spent her life in foster care who finds her biological parents, Nate Bazile and Cate Cassidy. Wishing to become emancipated, Lux is instead given in to their custody.

While Life Unexpected received mostly positive reviews, it struggled in the ratings and was canceled by The CW in 2011.

== Plot ==
Lux Cassidy (Britt Robertson) has been through the foster care system for almost her whole life. Cate Cassidy (Shiri Appleby) gave birth to her at 16 but gave her up for adoption after Social Services promised her that the baby would be adopted quickly. But the baby had heart problems (ventricular septal defect) and needed countless surgeries, so she was not a desirable candidate for adoption and ended up in the foster-care system and group homes.

Just before her 16th birthday, Lux petitions a court to become an emancipated minor, but she learns that she must get signatures from her unknown birth parents. She locates her father, Nate Bazile (Kristoffer Polaha), who operates the Open Bar inside a building his father gave him. "Baze" lives like an overgrown frat boy above the bar with two roommates: his childhood best friend Math (Austin Basis), a high-school teacher; and Jamie (Reggie Austin), who also works at the bar. As he signs the papers, Baze begins to bond with his newfound daughter, noticing that she has his eyes.

Baze introduces Lux to her mother Cate Cassidy, co-host of the "Morning Madness" drive time show at Portland radio station K-100 and Baze's former one-night stand from high school. Lux has been listening to Cate's voice on the radio for as long as she can remember, imagining an instant connection to the mom she's never met. Baze takes Lux to meet Cate, who is shocked and saddened to learn that Lux has grown up in foster care instead of the real adoptive home she had been promised her baby would have, and she's reluctant to commit to her daughter. Eventually Cate wants to be a part of Lux's life, making efforts to show care.

When a judge decides that Lux isn't ready for emancipation and unexpectedly grants temporary joint custody to Baze and Cate, they agree to try to get past the awkwardness. Because of her radio-host job and suitable house, Cate is given primary custody of Lux. Ryan Thomas (Kerr Smith), her radio-broadcast partner and fiancé, also bonds with Lux and is sometimes better able to reach her than her parents, because he's faced issues similar to Lux'.

As the series progresses, Baze becomes more responsible and works harder to get the bar and the loft apartment in shape so it's fit for Lux to stay with him sometimes, by setting aside a corner of the loft for her bedroom. Their growing relationship motivates slacker-esque Baze to prove that he can come through for Lux and provide support and love. Cate repeatedly disappoints Lux, while meaning well. Alice (Erin Karpluk), producer of her radio show, serves as Cate's much-needed confidante.

Ryan breaks up with Cate, but they reconcile and the engagement is back on. He also relents a bit towards Baze after the two have drinks and Baze explains that all he is to Cate is Lux's father. By the end of the series, Baze and Ryan are good friends.

Baze's bar is owned by his father Jack (Robin Thomas), who considers Baze a disappointment. Jack softens somewhat towards Baze in later episodes due to Lux's entrance in their lives. Baze later buys the bar. Also seen are Cate's four-times-divorced mother who had convinced Cate to give up Lux, and Baze's level-headed, understanding mother Ellen (Susan Hogan). Both love Lux when they meet her, while Ellen displays a more mature, grandmotherly nature with her.

Lux had been attending Longfellow High, a rough high school in Portland, but Cate enrolls her at Westmonte High, the alma mater of herself, Baze, and Math, and the institution at which Math currently teaches. At first infuriated, Lux soon adapts and makes friends, among them popular Jones Mager (Austin Butler) who is the quarterback like her father was. Meanwhile, she wonders how friends from her old life might fit into her new one. Tasha Siviac has been her best friend since she was seven (they met at Sunnyvale, the foster-care home), and Lux hopes to stay in touch with her, her boyfriend Gavin, and Lux's own first boyfriend Bug, who has been in trouble with the law; this might imperil Lux's new life with Baze and Cate. Lux's longtime social worker Fern Redmund is instrumental in helping Cate and Baze get their parental rights reinstated and helping the three become an official family. Fern thus becomes a family friend.

At various times Baze incurs Cate's wrath by sleeping with Cate's younger sister, Lux's Aunt Abby, a neurotic therapist and yoga practitioner. Baze also sleeps with Ryan's sister Paige after a drunk incident in season two.

Lux meets a young man, Eric Daniels, at Baze's bar. After she goes on a date with him she discovers that he is her new teacher. The second season deals with this affair, which ends when Eric leaves town when Cate and Baze threaten to call the police if he doesn't resign his job and leave Portland. Cate and Ryan's are now married and attempts to conceive. Baze deals with feelings for his coworker Emma. Tasha becomes more a part of the family's life after she strikes out on her own. Bug and Gavin disappear, Bug having left town after Lux rejected his marriage proposal.

Cate miscarries her child with Ryan because of a condition she developed after having Lux. Lux being the only child she will have, strengthens their relationship and Lux embraces that she has a real mom who loves her. After nearly giving in to desire, Baze breaks up with Emma after learning from Lux that Emma had had an affair with his dad. It didn't happen when Baze was going out with her, but it meant his dad cheating on his mother, and he decided that he could never be with Emma without thinking of his father.

The show then fast-forwards two years to Lux delivering the commencement speech at her graduation. It is revealed that Ryan and Julia are together and have a young son from their affair, and that Baze and Cate are together as a couple. Math and Alice are married and expecting. Jones kisses Lux, indicating that they end up together. Tasha is seen happy for them. At the end, the family and friends take a photo together.

== Cast ==
- Britt Robertson as Lux Cassidy
  - Megan Charpentier as Young Little Lux Cassidy
- Shiri Appleby as Cate Cassidy
- Kristoffer Polaha as Nathaniel "Baze" Bazile
- Kerr Smith as Ryan Thomas
- Austin Basis as Matthew "Math" Rogers
- Ksenia Solo as Natasha "Tash" Siviac
- Emma Caulfield as Emma Bradshaw
- Arielle Kebbel as Paige
- Austin Butler as Jones Mager
- Lucia Walters as Fern Redmund
- Erin Karpluk as Alice
- Rafi Gavron as Bobby "Bug" Guthrie
- Shaun Sipos as Eric Daniels
- Landon Liboiron as Sam
- Reggie Austin as Jamie
- Alexandra Breckenridge as Abby Cassidy

== Background ==
Creator Liz Tigelaar came up with the idea for the show in 2007 and developed it with director Gary Fleder. Tigelaar and Fleder pitched the show, then titled Light Years, to ABC Studios who accepted it, selling the show to The CW. In September 2008 The CW ordered the show to pilot. After the pilot was ordered, ABC dropped the show for financial reasons. The show was picked up by CBS Television Studios. The pilot was filmed in January 2009, written by Tigelaar and directed by Fleder. Both served as executive producers.

The CW announced the series in January 2009 under the working title of Light Years because the main character Lux's name means Light. According to Tigelaar, the title "tested way too sci-fi" and it was changed to LUX in April. Soon changed again into Life Unexpected, the series was promoted at the CW Upfronts in May as Parental Discretion Advised. That June, the network reverted to the name Life UneXpected, highlighting the name of the main character in capital letters. Initial advertising for the series in fall 2009 listed it without the capitalized "X", which became the final version.

== Production ==
While the show is set in Portland, Oregon, most of the filming was done in Vancouver, British Columbia. Many external scenes were filmed in Portland, including the many bridges, MAX Lightrail, China Town Arch, Portland's Amtrak Union Station, and other Portland locations. Scenes of Westmonte High were filmed at Sutherland Secondary School in North Vancouver and H. J. Cambie Secondary School in Richmond, British Columbia. The exterior of Baze's bar is located on Granville Island and the Ironworks Building in Vancouver. North Shore Studios, formally Lionsgate, was used as the primary studio for season one while Coast Mountain Film Studios housed the show for the second and final season.

The show premiered on The CW on Monday, January 18, 2010. The 13-episode first season run ended on April 12, 2010. The series was picked up for a second season for an initial thirteen episode order, which premiered on September 14, 2010 airing on Tuesdays at 9/8c (following One Tree Hill).

In October 2010, The CW ordered two additional scripts. In November 2010 The CW declined to order the back 9 episodes for the show's second and final season, leaving the season's episode count at 13. Members of the cast campaigned to save the show. On December 6, 2010 series creator, Liz Tigelaar made the TV show's cancellation official via Twitter.

=== One Tree Hill crossover ===
In an attempt to improve Life Unexpected's ratings by attracting One Tree Hill viewers, The CW aired a crossover event involving both programs on October 12, 2010. Beginning with One Tree Hill installment "Nobody Taught Us to Quit", Haley James Scott (Bethany Joy Lenz) and Mia Catalano (Kate Voegele) traveled to Portland (where Life Unexpected is set) to perform at the Sugar Magnolia Music Festival hosted by K-100. Haley and Cate meet in the crossover and are "surprised to learn that they share a similar back story [as] mothers." "Music Faced," the Life Unexpected episode of the crossover, also featured Sarah McLachlan, Ben Lee and Rain Perry whose song "Beautiful Tree" serves as the series' opening theme.

== Episodes ==
=== Series overview ===
Season	Episodes	Originally released	
Season	Episodes	First released	Last released
1	13	January 18, 2010	April 12, 2010
2	13	September 14, 2010	January 18, 2011

=== Season 1 (2010) ===
No. overall	No. in season	Title	Directed by	Written by	Original release date	US viewers (millions)	18-49 Rating/Share
1	1	"Pilot"	Gary Fleder	Liz Tigelaar	January 18, 2010	2.74	1.2/3
After going from foster home to foster home her whole life, fifteen-year-old Lux applies for emancipation from the foster care system. The paperwork requires the signatures of both of her birth parents, neither of whom she has met. Lux tracks down Baze, her father, to the bar he owns and lives above with his friends, and he tells her her mother is local radio personality Cate Cassidy. At the hearing the next day the judge rejects Lux's petition and places her instead in the temporary joint custody of Cate and Baze, to everyone's surprise. After breaking up with her fiancé, Ryan, Cate unexpectedly sleeps with Baze.
2	2	"Home Inspected"	Gary Fleder	Liz Tigelaar	January 25, 2010	2.12	1.0/3
Lux temporarily moves in with Cate, who is very worried about what Child Protective Services will think of her and Baze as parents. At work Cate is asked to read a statement over the radio denying she had a baby in high school, which a hurt Lux hears over the radio. After realizing how much she has hurt Lux, Cate sets the record straight on the radio the next day. Cate and Baze impress Fern, the CPS worker, who grants them permanent custody of Lux.
3	3	"Rent Uncollected"	Gary Fleder	Liz Tigelaar	February 1, 2010	2.07	1.0/2
Cate reluctantly attends a dinner for Lux at Baze’s parents' house, and the situation becomes complicated when Cate’s mother Laverne and sister Abby arrive unexpectedly. Meanwhile, worried about Lux's safety at her school, Cate arranges for her to transfer to Westmonte High, where Cate and Baze graduated. When Baze's father threatens to take away the bar because Baze can't pay the rent, Lux uses her own money to pay Baze's rent.
4	4	"Bong Intercepted"	Jeff Melman	Emily Whitesell	February 8, 2010	2.01	0.9/2
After Lux is suspended from school, Cate desperately tries to get Lux's principal to drop the suspension. To get the principal's sympathy for Lux, Cate brings Lux's foster care file to the meeting with the principal, and another student manages to photocopy the file. Lux is distraught when photocopies from the file are stuck to her locker the next day for everyone to see. Meanwhile, Baze is upset when he discovers Cate and Ryan will host a radio station event at a competing bar.
5	5	"Turtle Undefeated"	Allan Arkush	Adele Lim	February 15, 2010	1.82	0.9/2
Lux volunteers to host a classmate's party at Baze's loft, hoping to become more accepted by the students at her new school, but this fails when Baze finds out and lectures her about what she did. (This shows that Baze is shaking off his semi-frat boy behavior in favor of him becoming a father). Cate sees that Baze and Lux have made a great connection and she worries that she will never have a similar relationship with Lux.
6	6	"Truth Unrevealed"	Nick Marck	Janet Leahy	February 22, 2010	1.96	0.9/2
Baze joins Ryan and Cate on "Morning Madness" because of pressure from the station management, but the show does not go as expected. Worried about her boyfriend, Lux must convince Jones Mager, a popular high school track star, to not press charges against him.
7	7	"Crisis Unaverted"	Jerry Levine	Taylor Hamra	March 1, 2010	1.88	0.8/2
After learning that Tasha may have to move three hours away to a new foster home, Lux decides to help her find her mother who is still in Minneapolis. Baze and Ryan compete in a radio station contest as Cate worries about whether she should tell Ryan the whole truth about sleeping with Baze. After Tasha's mother rejects her, Lux asks Cate to take Tasha in, but she refuses.
8	8	"Bride Unbridled"	David Paymer	Sallie Patrick	March 8, 2010	1.99	0.9/2
Recently broken-up Cate and Ryan must host a wedding expo pretending to be an engaged couple, and things become even more awkward when Baze and Math show up to the same event. Meanwhile, Baze organizes for Jones to take Lux out to cheer her up after Tasha leaves and she moves out of Cate's.
9	9	"Formal Reformed"	J. Miller Tobin	Liz Tigelaar	March 15, 2010	2.11	1.0/3
Jones asks Lux to the Winter Formal, but things become complicated with Bug returns to town. Recalling that the night of his Winter Formal was the night he and Cate conceived Lux, Baze decides to enlist Cate's therapist sister Abby to help him give Lux a sex talk. However, when Baze finds a condom in Lux's room later that night, he decides to go to the formal to check up, worrying that Lux hadn't listened. Cate is also at the formal, having volunteered to chaperon so she can see Lux in her dress. A fragile Baze sleeps with Abby after the formal.
10	10	"Family Therapized"	Michael Katleman	Deidre Shaw	March 22, 2010	1.88	0.9/2
Fern, Lux's social worker meets with Cate and Baze after Bug and Lux are picked up by the police. Cate tries to get Bug a job at the radio station, but her boss will not hire him as he wasn't as experienced as he needed to be. She becomes enraged after finding out Baze hires Bug, accusing him of undermining her attempts to make things right with Lux, since Lux became greatly upset that Cate said she could get him a job, but didn't. Lux tearfully tells her parents the truth about her feelings towards Cate's lack of concern while she was in foster care.
11	11	"Storm Weathered"	Rick Bota	Michael Kramer	March 29, 2010	2.05	0.9/3
Cate discovers Abby and Baze have been sleeping together. Despite rejecting Jones at a party, Lux is hurt when later that same night she sees him kissing another girl. When a storm hits Portland, Cate becomes stranded at Baze's along with Abby and things get heated between the two sisters. Meanwhile, Lux and Ryan bond when they are forced to stay at the radio station during the storm and she shares with Ryan her history at Sunnyvale and how she met Natasha. The storm ruins Cate and Ryan's plans to elope.
12	12	"Father Unfigured"	Elizabeth Allen	Adele Lim	April 5, 2010	1.73	0.8/2
As Cate's wedding approaches, she decides to find her father who abandoned her as a child against the advisory of her mother. People from Bug's past trash Baze's bar when Bug can't pay them the money he owes them, forcing Lux to get Baze away from the bar for a few days so Bug can clean it up. Lux pleads with Cate to allow Baze to go on the trip to meet Cate's father, and the three of them go on a family road trip. Cate's father hurts her when she realizes he does not want to be a father to her, and she and Baze bond on the trip.
13	13	"Love Unexpected"	Jerry Levine	Liz Tigelaar	April 12, 2010	1.80	0.9/3
Cate's quickly approaching wedding forces her to deal with her feelings for both Ryan and Baze. Feeling he is not good enough for Cate, Baze denies he has feelings for her and Cate resolves to marry Ryan. Lux desperately tries to convince both Cate and Baze to admit their feelings, but a conversation with Ryan makes her think Cate and Baze together can never be more than a fantasy. After a heart-felt conversation with his father, Baze rushes to the church to tell Cate he loves her, although he was stuck in traffic that delayed him to bursting in through the doors, after as the priest marries them. Even after seeing Baze, Cate kisses Ryan showing she chooses him and not Baze and it disappoints him that he did not admit his feelings earlier when he had the chance.

=== Season 2 (2010–11) ===
The series was renewed by The CW for a second season on May 20, 2010. It was also moved to Tuesday nights at 9:00 p.m.

No. overall	No. in season	Title	Directed by	Written by	Original release date	US viewers (millions)
14	1	"Ocean Uncharted"	Gary Fleder	Liz Tigelaar & Sallie Patrick	September 14, 2010	1.65
Cate and Ryan return from their honeymoon only to discover that major changes have been made at the radio station while they were gone. Lux meets Eric, a newcomer to Portland who comes into the bar while the place is closed. Baze struggles with his feelings for Cate, and ends up sleeping with the new bartender, Paige. Lux and Bug find themselves at major crossroads in their relationship after he asks her to marry him (she turns him down, and he angrily leaves town). Paige accidentally sets the bar on fire after leaving a lit cigarette in the bin. Baze, thinking Lux was asleep in the bar, rushes in to rescue her, and is hospitalized due to smoke inhalation. Cate is fired from the radio station; Lux is comforted by Baze after she tells him that Bug left town.
15	2	"Parents Unemployed"	Jerry Levine	Patti Carr & Lara Olsen	September 21, 2010	1.57
After being summoned to the principal's office, Cate and Baze learn that Lux is failing and must make big improvements in her grades, which results to Lux cheating on tests. Meanwhile, Cate starts the difficult process of finding another job and Baze decides to interview for a position at his father's firm to help pay for his burnt down bar, in which he meets Emma.
16	3	"Criminal Incriminated"	Nick Marck	Taylor Hamra	September 28, 2010	1.51
Worried that she may not pass an important exam, Lux contemplates cheating and buys the answers off one of her classmates when she hears him talking about how he and his friends were going to cheat. Cate accidentally eats some banana bread that has been laced with pot by Paige and ends up having a very interesting day at work. Meanwhile, when a large sum of money goes missing from Cate's wallet, she and Ryan argue over whether or not, Ryan's slacking sister who was crashing at their house, had taken the money, as she owed Baze for destroying his bar.
17	4	"Team Rebounded"	Elizabeth Allen	Adele Lim	October 5, 2010	1.51
Cate attempts to bond with Ryan's new on-air partner, Kelly Campbell, after their work relationship turns bitter. But the plan backfires for Cate when Kelly accidentally reveals a secret to Ryan the next day, one Cate has been hiding from him. Tasha returns to Portland and tells Lux that she is now living with a new foster family, although Lux seemed to be quite familiar with Tasha's new foster parent. Also, Baze tries to convince a smitten Math to ask Paige out on a date.
18	5	"Music Faced"	Jerry Levine	Deidre Shaw	October 12, 2010	1.59
In a very special episode, Ryan hosts a music festival sponsored by the radio station and features One Tree Hill's Haley James Scott (Bethany Joy Galeotti) and Mia Catalano (Kate Voegele). Haley and Cate meet at the concert and discover that they have very similar backgrounds and when a secret of Cate's comes out, Cate turns to Haley for advice. Lux finds out that Eric is dating Paige. Meanwhile, Jones becomes interested in Tasha and Baze and Emma become a little closer when Baze's plan to take Emma backstage for an interview doesn't go as he thought. Cate and her mother confront one another about their pasts, after the latter loses Lux, while she was supposed to watch her; but when Lux needs comfort from Cate, she is there to give it to her.
19	6	"Honeymoon Interrupted"	Sanaa Hamri	Christopher Fife	October 19, 2010	1.48
To make up for the fact that they never had a proper honeymoon, Cate and Ryan go on a stay-cation at local hotel. But unfortunately for them, Baze's work retreat is at the same exact place. Cate begins to discover more and more about Ryan's old ex-girlfriend, Julia (Jaime Ray Newman), who was in one of their pictures in their wedding photo album. Baze attempts to trade rooms with Ryan and Cate to be in the room with a connecting door to Emma's room, as he tries to get closer to her.
20	7	"Camp Grounded"	Bobby Roth	Liz Tigelaar & Sallie Patrick	November 2, 2010	1.50
Lux and her classmates go on a school field-trip, with Math, Cate, Ryan, Baze, Emma, and Eric as chaperones. Ryan and Cate's cheating situation worsens when he doesn't show up at a couple's counseling session. Thinking that Ryan wasn't going to come because of his and Cate's problem, Baze invites Emma, and they bond when he prepares a special dinner on the school bus for them. Eric finally gives in to seeing Lux, but Tasha ends up seeing them together, kissing.
21	8	"Plumber Cracked"	Jerry Levine	Lara Olsen & Patti Carr	November 9, 2010	1.48
Cate takes Paige out in a failed attempt to get her drunk in the hopes of finding out more about Ryan's past, including information about the mysterious Julia. Meanwhile, Ryan decides to join Baze, Math and Jamie for a guys night, ditching Paige, making her be stuck with Cate. Emma reveals to Baze that she has a son when Baze does too much snooping around thinking Emma was cheating on him. Lux and Eric spend a day away from Portland, where they wouldn't have to keep their relationship a secret from everyone, but end up having to stay a night in a hotel room when they miss the last boat home.
22	9	"Homecoming Crashed"	Elizabeth Allen	Sallie Patrick	November 16, 2010	1.33
Baze and Emma attempt to sign Candy (Krista Allen), a high-profile client, who seems to only have eyes for Baze. Meanwhile, Lux goes to her homecoming dance in hopes of seeing Eric but the evening takes an ugly turn. Basically she has to take Emma's son the Homecoming and gets in trouble for "smoking" when she actually took the joint away from Emma's son. Cate gets back from her visit from Valerie's claiming that Valerie told her Lux is the one that injured herself when it was actually her husband. Tasha hits the husband with a shovel because Lux was being abused by him. They crash and Emma's son takes the blame and covers Lux
23	10	"Thanks Ungiven"	Cherie Nowlan	Patti Carr & Lara Olsen	November 30, 2010	1.52
It doesn't take long for secrets to start coming out when everyone ends up at Baze's for Thanksgiving. Lux worries that her parents will discover she's been seeing her teacher, Eric. Baze worries his father, Jack, will find out he has been having a relationship with his boss, Emma. Tasha worries a deep, dark secret from the past will be discovered and Cate worries if she tells Ryan the truth, it will complicate their relationship further. Emma's son, Sam, also joins everyone for Thanksgiving.
24	11	"Stand Taken"	Gary Fleder	Adele Lim	December 7, 2010	1.73
Lux and Tasha's friendship is put to the test when they are forced to deal with the fallout of their recent actions and the outcome could change both of their lives. As a result, Lux feels she can't hide her past from Cate and Baze anymore and reveals what happened when she lived with Trey and Valerie. Jack and Baze are infuriated with Trey abusing Lux and both go after the child rapist. Lux discovers Emma and Jack were seeing each other before Baze started dating her.
25	12	"Teacher Schooled"	Howie Deutch	Liz Tigelaar & Taylor Hamra	January 18, 2011	1.54
Baze decides to buy a house and wants Emma and Sam to live with him. Eric confesses that he and Lux had a relationship which incurs Baze and Cate's combined wrath. Baze comes to terms with the fact that his father cheated on his mother with Emma prior to their relationship. Cate and Baze threaten to go to the Police if Eric doesn't leave town.
26	13	"Affair Remembered"	Rick Bota	Michael Kramer	January 18, 2011	1.48
Cate and Ryan come to terms when she loses the baby and is told she can't have anymore children. Ellen, Baze's mom, has a 60th Birthday party for Jack at Baze's Bar, much to his discomfort. Lux and Jones cut school to go visit Tasha in Juvy. Lux tells Jones that she and Eric had a relationship. Ryan gets Cate back on the air after Kelly is fired. Alice returns to town and her job at the radio station. Cate finds out that Julia (Jaime Ray Newman) is still pregnant and tells Ryan. Two Years Later. Lux gives a speech at her graduation. She and Jones are back together. Tasha is also graduating and will attend college with Lux and Jones. Ryan and Julia have a son. Alice and Math are expecting their first child. Cate and Baze are back together and share a kiss. Lux, for the first time since she found out about and met them two years previous, calls Cate and Baze Mom and Dad; and Julia takes a photo of everybody at the graduation as the episode closes.

== Reception ==
=== Critical response ===
The first season of Life Unexpected scored a 69 out of 100 on Metacritic. The series has garnered mostly positive feedback, with many reviews favorably comparing the show to the critically acclaimed series Gilmore Girls and Everwood. Maureen Ryan, from the Chicago Tribune, stated that the show "recall[s] the good things about shows like Gilmore Girls and Everwood," and similarly, Hank Stuever from The Washington Post called it "a pleasant mix of a little Juno hipitude and a lot of Everwood glow." Furthermore, the Chicago Tribune review called Life Unexpected a program "that parents and their older kids could enjoy together without feeling condescended to," and The Boston Globe's Matthew Gilbert states that "the show works, in its own hokey, feel-good, alt-soundtrack way."

Show writer Liz Tigelaar (who has also worked on Brothers & Sisters, American Dreams, and Once and Again), has received much praise. A review in the Los Angeles Times called Tigelaar's writing smart and insightful. Similarly, Randee Dawn, from The Hollywood Reporter stated that Tigelaar "has a delicate, spot-on feel for dialogue." The Futon Critic's Brian Ford Sullivan singled out writer Liz Tigelaar and director Gary Fleder for adeptly exploring Lux's perceived lack of love in her life.

On a less positive note, a review in the Chicago Sun Times by Paige Wiser called the show "somewhat predictable" and The Post's Stuever adds that Life Unexpected "burns off its most interesting plot twist [...] in the first 20 minutes."

=== Ratings ===
Season	Timeslot (ET)	# Ep.	Original Airing			Rank	Viewers (in millions)	Network
Season	Timeslot (ET)	# Ep.	Season premiere	Season finale	TV season	Rank	Viewers (in millions)	Network
1	Monday 9:00PM; Monday 8:00PM	13	January 18, 2010	April 12, 2010	2009–2010	#136	2.01	The CW
2	Tuesday 9:00PM	13	September 14, 2010	January 18, 2011	2010–2011	#140	1.50	The CW

=== Accolades ===
Life Unexpected was nominated for "Choice TV Breakout Show" at the 2010 Teen Choice Awards.

== Broadcast ==
In Canada the show premiered on the free-to-air channel CBC Television and on the pay TV channel YTV Canada. In Europe the show premiered on E4 for the United Kingdom from September 19, 2010, on Sixx for Germany from January 4, 2011, and on RTÉ Two for Ireland from August 2011. In Oceania the show premiered on MediaWorks' C4 for New Zealand from October 2010 and on Network Ten for Australia from November 5, 2011. In India the show premiered on Big CBS Prime from February 2013.

== Home media releases ==
The two seasons were released together on DVD in Region 1 on April 5, 2011. It was later released in Region 4 in 2012.
