= Tempe Tip =

2001 film

- Directed by: Michael Ralph
- Written by: Michael Ralph
- Produced by: David Rowe
- Starring: Jason Donovan; Helen Dallimore; Gary Sweet; Gary Day; Simon Westaway
- Edited by: Denise Haratzis
- Release date: 2001
- Running time: 93 minutes
- Country: Australia
- Language: English
- Budget: $3 million

Tempe Tip is a 2001 Australian comedy film. It was shot in Adelaide.

== Plot ==
Max (Jason Donovan) and Joy (Helen Dallimore) move into their new home in inner west Sydney, and while building a backyard swimming pool they happen upon a fortuitous discovery. This in turn leads to a mining operation where they rope in a group of culturally diverse neighbours to lend a hand.

== Cast ==
- Jason Donovan as Max Franklin
- Helen Dallimore as Joy
- Gary Sweet as Nico
- Gary Day as Norman Crisp
- Simon Westaway as Vladimir
- Bruno Xavier as Ashok
- Paul Dalglish as Ravi
- Charlotte Rees as Greta

== Production ==
The budget was reportedly $3 million and filming began in October 2000.

Tempe Tip was shortlisted for the 2001 Hawaii International Film Festival.
