= Kirstie Alley's Big Life =

2010 American reality television series

- Genre: Reality
- Starring: Kirstie Alley
- Country of origin: United States
- Original language: English
- No. of seasons: 1
- No. of episodes: 12

Production
- Executive producers: Colleen Conway; George Moll; Kirstie Alley; Robert Sharenow
- Producers: Michael Lang; Jason Weinberg
- Running time: 22 minutes
- Production company: FremantleMedia North America

Original release
- Network: A&E
- Release: March 21 – May 9, 2010

Kirstie Alley's Big Life is an American reality television series on A&E that debuted March 21, 2010. The series chronicles the life of Kirstie Alley as she works to lose weight, launch a weight loss program and be a single mother. The series was distributed and aired on A&E prior to the series being shifted to Lifetime. At the time of filming, Alley weighed 228 pounds (103 kg). Alley was the star of the show, but not the heaviest person on the show. Jim (her handyman) weighed roughly 100 pounds more than Alley, weighing in at 324 pounds (147 kg). The two of them were the only overweight people on the show; together they weighed 552 pounds (250 kg). Alley ended up losing most of the weight she had hoped to eliminate while following the diet that she had created.

== Cast ==
- Kirstie Alley
- Jim — Kirstie's handyman
- Lillie — Kirstie's daughter
- True — Kirstie's son
- Kyle — Kirstie's assistant
- Tracy — Kirstie's stylist
- Kelly — Kirstie's executive assistant

== Episodes ==
No.	Title	Original release date
1	"The Tipping Point"	March 21, 2010
2	"Good Help is Hard to Find"	March 21, 2010
3	"Oh Rats! It's My Birthday!"	March 28, 2010
4	"Swimmin' in the Rain"	March 28, 2010
5	"Dirty Deeds Done Dirt Cheap"	April 4, 2010
6	"Jimmy Pig"	April 4, 2010
7	"They Tried to Make Me Go to Twee-hab"	April 11, 2010
8	"The Way We Weren't"	April 18, 2010
9	"Preparation-K"	April 25, 2010
10	"As Seen on TV"	May 2, 2010
11	"Fat Like Me"	May 9, 2010
12	"Cou-ga-roo"	May 9, 2010
