= Britt Robertson =

American actress (born 1990)

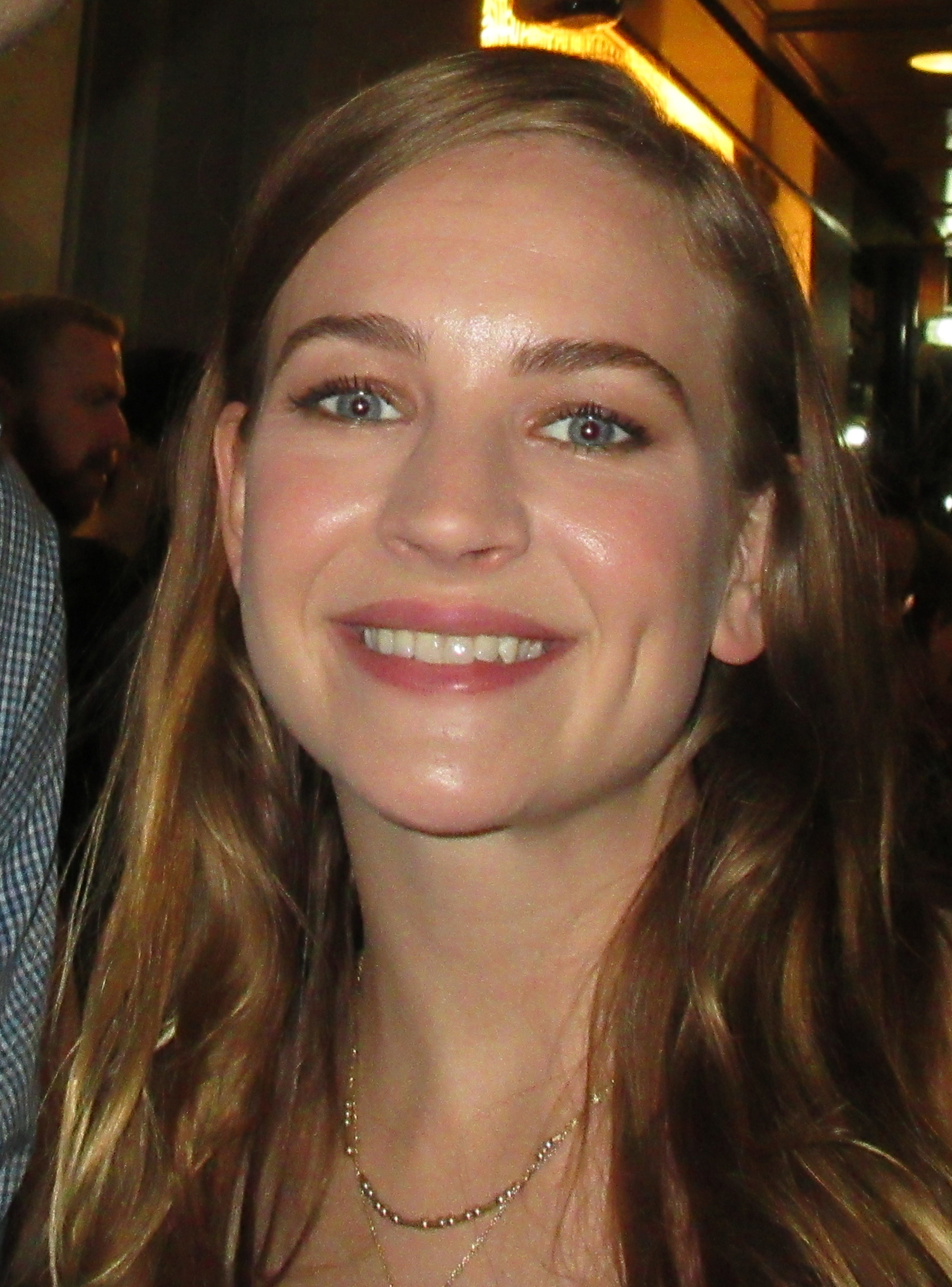
- Robertson in 2018
- Born: Brittany Leanna Robertson; April 18, 1990 (age 36); Charlotte, North Carolina, U.S.
- Other name: Britt Robertson-Floyd
- Occupation: Actress
- Years active: 2000–present
- Spouse: Paul Floyd (m. 2023)
- Children: 1

Brittany Leanna Robertson-Floyd (née Robertson; born April 18, 1990), known professionally as Britt Robertson, is an American actress.

Raised in Greenville, South Carolina, at age 14, Robertson moved to Los Angeles with her grandmother to audition for TV roles, a pivotal move that led to her living independently from the age of 16. Robertson's early career saw her performing on stage at the Greenville Little Theater, before transitioning to screen, making her debut in an episode of Sheena in 2000. Her subsequent roles in television and film included Power Rangers Time Force, and The Ghost Club, and more significant parts in Growing Pains: Return of the Seavers, Dan in Real Life, and The Tenth Circle.

Her lead roles in series such as Life Unexpected (2010–2011) and The Secret Circle (2011–2012) enabled further recognition. Robertson gained wider acclaim for her performances in Under the Dome (2013–2014), Tomorrowland (2015), and as the lead in Girlboss (2017), portraying a fictionalized version of entrepreneur Sophia Amoruso. Her career continued with roles in films like I Still Believe and on television in The Rookie: Feds (2022).

== Early life ==
Brittany Leanna Robertson was born at Novant Health Presbyterian Medical Center in Charlotte, North Carolina on April 18, 1990, to Beverly (née Hayes) and Ryan Robertson, a restaurant owner. Robertson grew up in Greenville, South Carolina. She is the oldest of seven children; her mother and stepfather have three children (two girls, one boy), and her father and stepmother also have three children (one girl, two boys).

Her grandmother, Shuler Robertson, took her to Los Angeles when she was 14 years old in order to allow her to audition for TV pilots. Robertson said that they would knit together during down-time on set. Her grandmother returned to North Carolina when Robertson was 16, at which point she lived on her own in Los Angeles.

== Career ==
Robertson first appeared before an audience when performing various roles on stage at the Greenville Little Theater in her hometown. At age 12, she began making extended trips to Los Angeles to audition for roles in television; she was cast in a role in a pilot for a series which was never picked up by a network. She made her screen debut as the younger version of the title character in an episode of Sheena in 2000. She made a guest appearance on Power Rangers Time Force the following year and received a Young Artist Award nomination for Best Performance in a TV Movie, Miniseries, or Special – Leading Young Actress for her role in The Ghost Club (2003).

Robertson was selected to play Michelle Seaver in the Growing Pains: Return of the Seavers in 2004. A role in Keeping Up with the Steins followed in 2006. She played Cara Burns in the 2007 film Dan in Real Life. Robertson appeared in CSI: Crime Scene Investigation in the episode "Go to Hell", and had a role as a recurring character in the CBS television series Swingtown.

In 2008, she played the protagonist in a Lifetime original film, The Tenth Circle, based on Jodi Picoult's novel of the same name, followed by other television roles.

In 2009, she appeared in Mother and Child. In the same year, she played a small role as DJ in The Alyson Stoner Project. She also made a guest appearance on Law & Order: Special Victims Unit in the episode "Babes" as Tina Bernardi, a Catholic teen who gets pregnant in a pact. In late autumn 2010, she starred as Allie Pennington in the Disney Channel original film Avalon High.

Robertson played the lead role of Lux Cassidy in the television drama series Life Unexpected (2010–2011), which was cancelled in its second season despite positive reviews. In 2011, she appeared in Scream 4. She also had a leading role in the supernatural teen drama television series The Secret Circle (2011–2012), but after its first season, it was also cancelled. That same year, she starred in the film The First Time. Robertson received positive reviews for her role.

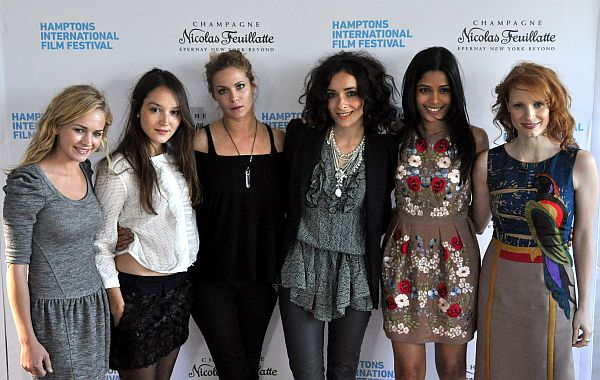
Robertson, Anaïs Demoustier, Pihla Viitala, Zrinka Cvitešić, Freida Pinto and Jessica Chastain at the 2010 Hamptons International Film Festival

In 2013, she joined the main cast of the science fiction mystery television series Under the Dome in the role of Angie, which she played until 2014. She had subsequent roles in the films Delivery Man (2013) and Ask Me Anything (2014), for which she won the Best Actress award at the Nashville Film Festival. In 2014, Robertson won the Boston Film Festival Award for Best Supporting Actress for White Rabbit. In 2015, she starred in The Longest Ride and also played the starring role in the film Tomorrowland, for which she was nominated for the Teen Choice Award for Choice Movie Actress – Sci-Fi/Fantasy.

Robertson received wider recognition in 2015 after landing the role of Sophia Danko in The Longest Ride; she received a nomination for the Teen Choice Award for Choice Movie Actress – Drama. In 2016, she starred in the films Mr. Church and Mother's Day, and in 2017, she starred in the science fiction romance film The Space Between Us and in the comedy-drama film A Dog's Purpose. That same year, she headlined the Netflix comedy television series Girlboss, portraying a fictionalized version of self-made millionaire Sophia Amoruso. Robertson garnered praise for her portrayal of Sophia Marlowe despite the character's unlikeability. She starred in the ABC legal drama For the People for its entire two-season run.

In May 2019, Robertson was cast in the role of Melissa Henning, the real-life wife of Christian rock musician Jeremy Camp, in Lionsgate's faith-based biographical romance film I Still Believe. The film was released in March 2020. In January 2021, Robertson was added to the cast of the ABC drama Big Sky as recurring character Cheyenne Kleinsasser. On July 30, 2021, Robertson was cast in the independent film The Re-Education of Molly Singer as the title character. Despite the film's mixed reception, critics praised Robertson's performance.

== Personal life ==
On May 25, 2022, Robertson announced her engagement to British footballer Paul Floyd. The couple were married on April 8, 2023, in Los Angeles. In 2025, the couple's first child, a daughter, was born.

== Filmography ==
=== Film ===
Year	Title	Role	Notes
2003	The Ghost Club	Carrie	
2003	One of Them	Young Elizabeth	Direct-to-video
2004	The Last Summer	Beth	
2006	Keeping Up with the Steins	Ashley Grunwald	
2007	Dan in Real Life	Cara Burns	
2007	Frank	Anna York	
2008	From Within	Claire	
2009	The Alyson Stoner Project	DJ B-Rob	Direct-to-video
2009	Mother and Child	Violet	
2010	Cherry	Beth	
2010	Triple Dog	Chapin Wright	
2011	The Family Tree	Kelly Burnett	
2011	Scream 4	Marnie Cooper	
2011	Video Girl	Video Girl	
2012	The First Time	Aubrey Miller	
2013	Delivery Man	Kristen	
2013	White Rabbit	Julie	
2014	Ask Me Anything	Katie Kampenfelt / Amy	
2014	Cake	Becky	
2015	The Longest Ride	Sophia Danko	
2015	Tomorrowland	Casey Newton	
2016	Jack Goes Home	Cleo	
2016	Mr. Church	Charlie Brooks	
2016	Mother's Day	Kristin	
2017	A Dog's Purpose	Teenage Hannah	
2017	The Space Between Us	Tulsa	
2020	I Still Believe	Melissa Henning	
2020	Books of Blood	Jenna	
2021	A Mouthful of Air	Rachel Davis	
2022	About Fate	Carrie Hayes	
2023	The Re-Education of Molly Singer	Molly Singer	
2024	The Merry Gentlemen	Ashley	
2025	The Letter	Julia Davids	
TBA	Minute Mark †		Post-production

=== Television ===
Year	Title	Role	Notes
2000	Sheena	Little Sheena	Episode: "Buried Secrets"
2001	Power Rangers Time Force	Tammy	Episode: "Uniquely Trip"
2004	Growing Pains: Return of the Seavers	Michelle Seaver	Television film
2004	Tangled Up in Blue	Tula	Television film
2005–2006	Freddie	Mandy	2 episodes
2006	Jesse Stone: Night Passage	Michelle Genest	Television film
2006	Women of a Certain Age	Doria	Television film
2007	CSI: Crime Scene Investigation	Amy Macalino	Episode: "Go to Hell"
2007	The Winner	Vivica	Episode: "Pilot"
2008	Law & Order: Special Victims Unit	Tina Bernardi	Episode: "Babes"
2008	The Tenth Circle	Trixie Stone	Television film
2008	Swingtown	Samantha Saxton	Recurring role
2009	Law & Order: Criminal Intent	Kathy Devildis	Episode: "Family Values"
2009	Three Rivers	Brenda Stark	Episode: "Good Intentions"
2010	Avalon High	Allie Pennington	Television film
2010–2011	Life Unexpected	Lux Cassidy	Main role
2011–2012	The Secret Circle	Cassie Blake	Main role
2013–2014	Under the Dome	Angie McAlister	Main role
2016	Casual	Fallon	Recurring role (season 2)
2017	Girlboss	Sophia Marlowe	Main role
2018	Tangled: The Series	Vex	Voice; recurring role (3 episodes)
2018–2019	For the People	Sandra Bell	Main role
2020	Little Fires Everywhere	Rachel	Episode: "The Uncanny"
2020	Kappa Kappa Die	Jodi	Television film
2021	Big Sky	Cheyenne Kleinsasser	Recurring role
2022–2023	The Rookie: Feds	Laura Stenson	Main role
2022–2025	The Rookie	Laura Stenson	Recurring role

== Awards and nominations ==
Year	Association	Category	Work	Result	Ref.
2004	Young Artist Awards	Best Performance in a TV Movie, Miniseries or Special – Leading Young Actress	The Ghost Club	Nominated	
2014	Boston Film Festival	Best Supporting Actress	White Rabbit	Won	
2014	Nashville Film Festival	Best Actress	Ask Me Anything	Won	
2015	CinemaCon Award	Star of Tomorrow	N/A	Won	
2015	Teen Choice Awards	Choice Movie Actress: Drama	The Longest Ride	Nominated	
2015	Teen Choice Awards	Choice Movie Actress: Sci-Fi/Fantasy	Tomorrowland	Nominated	
2016	Teen Choice Awards	Choice AnTEENcipated Movie Actress	The Space Between Us	Nominated	
