= Too Close to the Sun =

Fictionalized musical about Ernest Hemingway's last days

- Promotional Poster
- Music: John Robinson
- Lyrics: Roberto Trippini; John Robinson
- Book: Roberto Trippini
- Basis: A fictional account of the final days in the life of Ernest Hemingway
- Productions: 2009 West End

Too Close to the Sun is a musical with a book by Roberto Trippini and music and lyrics by Trippini and John Robinson, based on a play by Ron Read. The musical is a fictionalized account of the last days in the life of Ernest Hemingway.

== Production ==
Too Close to the Sun began previews at the Comedy Theatre in the West End on 16 July 2009 and officially opened on 24 July. It received uniformly unfavourable reviews and closed on 8 August, bringing its planned eight-week run to an end six weeks early. Directed by Pat Garrett, the opening night cast included James Graeme as Ernest Hemingway, Helen Dallimore as Mary Hemingway, and Tammy Joelle as Louella. Citing a knee injury, Jay Benedict had withdrawn from his role of Rex early in the previews. He was replaced by Christopher Howell who performed all of the remaining performances. Sets and costumes were designed by Christopher Woods.

== Synopsis ==
In the summer of 1961 on the Hemingway ranch in Ketchum, Idaho, Hemingway's young secretary, Louella, is plotting to become his fifth wife and heir to his estate. Rex De Havilland, an old friend of the author and now a struggling Hollywood producer, arrives to secure the film rights to Hemingway's life. Anxious to achieve his goal by any means possible, he tries to convince Hemingway's wife Mary the project will give the ailing writer a new lease on life. Hemingway, however, fails to succumb to the charms of either Louella or Rex, and he banishes both from his home before committing suicide with a shot to his head.

== Musical numbers ==
Act I

- "Prologue"
- "Just Relax-Think Good Thoughts"
- "The Ketchum, Idaho Walk"
- "Do I Make A Certain Kind Of Sense?"
- "I Do Like To Be Liked"
- "Make Yourself One With The Gun"
- "Sentimental Small-Towner That I Am"
- "Super-Eager Little Her"
- "Illusion Lyrique"
- "All Will Be Well"
- "Hollywood!, Hollywood!"
- "Havana"
- "Too Close To The Sun"

Act II

- "In The World`s Face"
- "Alabama - The Queen Of Them All"
- "Waiting In The Shadows"
- "Just Gimme Half Of Half A Chance"
- "Strong And Silent Types"
- "Can`t Think Of It Without Wanting To Cry"
- "Stormy Weather, Boys"
- "Poor Little Silly Young Me"
- "Forgive Me Wife. You`ll Understand"
- "The Regret"
- "I Did My Best"
- "Character Gives You The Man"

== Critical response ==
The musical received unanimously unfavourable reviews. Dominic Maxwell of The Times rated it one out of five stars, calling it "pretty dire" and "such a muted, muddled experience, such a waste of time and talent, that there's not really much to snigger about." He described the score as "banal, borrowed and clumsy." Writing for The Guardian, Michael Billington also rated the "implausible and unnecessary musical" one out of five stars and cited "the instantly forgettable two dozen numbers by John Robinson that fatally clog the action." Rhoda Koenig of The Independent similarly rated it one star, writing: "Robinson's trite music pootles about aimlessly and tunelessly, and the lyrics (a Robinson-Trippini collaboration) eschew rhyme as well as reason." In closing, she observed, "Trippini complained some years ago that West End musicals were based on 'formulas which have proved capable of attracting a steady flow of ... customers.' There seems little danger of anyone taking Too Close to the Sun for one of these." Ben Dowell of thelondonpaper commented, "Even literary giant Ernest Hemingway would be hard pressed to summon words damning enough to capture quite how appalling, risible and offensively drab John Robinson's musical – yes musical ... is." Dowell gave it a no-star rating.
