= Jamie Johnston =

Canadian actor

- Born: James Michael Johnston; July 7, 1989 (age 37); Toronto, Ontario, Canada
- Occupation: Actor
- Years active: 1999–2016

James Michael Johnston (born July 7, 1989) is a Canadian retired actor and singer-songwriter. He is best known for his role as Peter Stone on Degrassi: The Next Generation.

== Personal life and career ==
Johnston was born July 7, 1989, in Toronto, Ontario, Canada. Johnston portrayed Peter Stone on Degrassi: The Next Generation from 2005 to 2010. He has been nominated for 8 Young Artist Awards in Los Angeles and won 2. He has also starred in the series Wild Card and Zixx: Level One. He has a wide range of interests, including soccer, snowboarding, skateboarding, cycling and playing the guitar and numerous other instruments. Jamie went to Kenya with the organization "Free the Children" to build a school and filmed as a special for MTV. Jamie has made numerous appearances on ET Canada and etalk. He has traveled extensively. He played guitar in a band called SoundSpeed along with a few of his fellow Degrassi cast mates. He also played the male lead as Lucas Green in the feature film Love Me. Other films include, "Jesus Henry Christ", "The Tenth Circle", "Killer Instinct", "My Babysitter's a Vampire", and numerous Movie of Week productions. In 2016, Johnston reprised his role as Peter Stone on Degrassi: Next Class for 4 episodes during its second season. He is currently in another band that has been signed, as the drummer. He also writes and composes.

== Filmography ==
List of film and television credits
Year	Title	Role	Notes
1999–2000	I Was a Sixth Grade Alien		
2001	Jackie, Ethel, Joan: The Women of Camelot	Young Patrick Kennedy	
2002	Winter Sun	Young Duncan	Independent short
2002	Doc	Bryce	Episode #209, "Karate Kid"
2002–2004	Ace Lightning		
2003	Name of the Rose	Young Rob	Independent feature
2003	Absolon	Boy	Feature film
2003	More Than Meets the Eye: The Joan Brock Story	Corey	Young Artist Award 2004, Best Performance in a TV Movie, Miniseries or Special — Supporting Young Actor
2003	Killer Instinct: From the Files of Agent Candice DeLong	Deegan Schauer	TV movie
2003	Public Domain	Ian	Feature film
2003–2005	Wild Card	Clifford "Cliff" Woodall	Nominated — Young Artist Award 2005, Best Performance in a TV Series (Comedy or Drama) — Leading Young Actor
2004	Zixx: Level One	Adam Frake	Series lead
2005	Zixx: Level Two	Adam	Guest star, Episode #2–21, "Now You See Him"
2005	The Rick Mercer Report	Son	Episode #3.3, in skit "Fatherly Advice"
2005–2010	Degrassi: The Next Generation	Peter Stone	Series regular, episodes #5.01–10.14; Nominated — Young Artist Award 2006, Best Performance in a TV series — Young Ensemble Performance; Nominated — Young Artist Award 2007, Best Performance in a TV Series — Leading Young Actor; Young Artist Award 2008, Best Performance in a TV Series — Leading Young Actor; Nominated — Young Artist Award 2009, Best Performance in a TV Series (Comedy or Drama) — Leading Young Actor; Nominated — Young Artist Award 2010, Best Performance in a TV Series (Comedy or Drama) — Leading Young Actor
2008	Degrassi Spring Break Movie	Peter Stone	TV movie
2008	The Tenth Circle	Jason Underhill	Nominated — Young Artist Award 2009, Best Performance in a TV Movie, Miniseries or Special — Supporting Young Actor
2009	Degrassi Goes Hollywood	Peter Stone	TV movie
2010	Degrassi Takes Manhattan	Peter Stone	TV movie
2010	My Babysitter's a Vampire	James	TV movie
2010	Reviving Ophelia	Ty Benchley	TV movie
2010	Connor Undercover	Andre	2 episodes
2011	Really Me	Dylan Dillon	2 episodes
2011	Jesus Henry Christ	Young Billy Herman	
2011	Wingin' It	Space Pirate Bruce	Episode "Reel Trouble"
2012	Wingin' It	Stone Hardcastle	Episode "Cosmonaut Claire 3-D"
2012	My Babysitter's a Vampire	Dirk Baddison	Episode "Welcome Back Dusker"
2014	Wet Bum	Nate	
2016	Degrassi: Next Class	Peter Stone	Recurring (Season 2)
2016	Total Frat Movie	Alex Watson	

- Symphony of Fire – Independent Short

=== Theatre ===
- Aesop Fables: A Man, A Boy & A Donkey – Donkey
- The Chrysalids – Mark
- Epimenides – Cabin Boy
- Job & The Snake – Neptune
