= List of Original Film productions =

Productions by American film and TV company

Original Film is an American film and television production company co-founded by Neal H. Moritz in 1990. Notable films the company has produced include the I Know What You Did Last Summer, Cruel Intentions, Fast & Furious, Jump Street, and Sonic the Hedgehog franchises, and notable television shows the company have produced include Prison Break, S.W.A.T. and The Boys.

== Films ==
Year	Title	Director	Distributor	Co-production companies	Notes	Budget	Gross
1990	Framed	Dean Parisot	HBO	HBO Pictures	Television film; Uncredited	N/A	
1992	Juice	Ernest R. Dickerson	Paramount Pictures	Island World	Credited as Moritz/Heyman Production	$5 million	$20.1 million
1994	The Stoned Age	James Melkonian	Trimark Pictures	N/A	Credited as Moritz/Heyman Production	N/A	
1994	Blind Justice	Richard Spence	HBO	HBO Pictures	Television film; Credited as Moritz/Heyman Production	N/A	
1997	Buster Pointdexter: Online	Gavin Bowden	Island Def Jam Music Group	N/A	Short film	N/A	
1997	Volcano	Mick Jackson	20th Century Fox	Fox 2000 Pictures; Donner-Shuler Donner Productions	Credited as Moritz Original	$90 million	$122.8 million
1997	I Know What You Did Last Summer	Jim Gillespie	Sony Pictures Releasing	Columbia Pictures; Mandalay Entertainment	Credited as Neal H. Moritz Production	$17 million	$125.2 million
1998	Reason Thirteen	C. Jay Cox	TLA Releasing	N/A	Short film	N/A	
1998	The Rat Pack	Rob Cohen	HBO	HBO Pictures	Television film	N/A	
1998	Urban Legend	Jamie Blanks	Sony Pictures Releasing	TriStar Pictures; Phoenix Pictures		$14 million	$72.5 million
1998	I Still Know What You Did Last Summer	Danny Cannon	Sony Pictures Releasing	Columbia Pictures; Mandalay Entertainment	Credited as Neal H. Moritz Production	$24 million	$84 million
1999	Cruel Intentions	Roger Kumble	Sony Pictures Releasing	Columbia Pictures; Newmarket Capital Group		$10.5 million	$76.3 million
1999	Blue Streak	Les Mayfield	Sony Pictures Releasing	Columbia Pictures; The IndieProd Company; Jaffe Productions	Credited as Neal H. Moritz Production	$36 million	$117.7 million
1999	Monster!	John Lafia	UPN	Village Roadshow Pictures; Wilshire Court Productions	Television film	N/A	
1999	Held Up	Steve Rash	Trimark Pictures	Minds Eye Entertainment		$8 million	$4 million
2000	Cabin by the Lake	Po-Chih Leong	USA Network	Great Falls Productions; USA Cable Entertainment	Television film	N/A	
2000	The Skulls	Rob Cohen	Universal Pictures	Newmarket Capital Group		$15 million	$50.8 million
2000	Urban Legends: Final Cut	John Ottman	Sony Pictures Releasing	Columbia Pictures; Phoenix Pictures		$14 million	$38.6 million
2000	Cruel Intentions 2	Roger Kumble	Columbia TriStar Home Video	Newmarket Capital Group	Direct-to-video	N/A	
2000	Hendrix	Leon Ichaso	Showtime	MGM Television	Television film	N/A	
2001	Saving Silverman	Dennis Dugan	Sony Pictures Releasing	Columbia Pictures; Village Roadshow Pictures		$22 million	$26 million
2001	The Fast and the Furious	Rob Cohen	Universal Pictures	Mediastream Film GmbH & Co. Productions KG	Credited as Neal H. Moritz Production	$38 million	$207.3 million
2001	Class Warfare	Richard Shepard	USA Network	British Columbia Film Commission; Dogwood Pictures; Jaffe/Braunstein Films; Muse Entertainment Enterprises	Television film	N/A	
2001	Return to Cabin by the Lake	Po-Chih Leong	USA Network	Great Falls Productions; USA Cable Entertainment	Television film	N/A	
2001	Soul Survivors	Stephen Carpenter	Artisan Entertainment	N/A		$17 million	$4.2 million
2001	The Glass House	Daniel Sackheim	Sony Pictures Releasing	Columbia Pictures		$30 million	$23.6 million
2001	Not Another Teen Movie	Joel Gallen	Sony Pictures Releasing	Columbia Pictures		$15 million	$66.5 million
2002	Slackers	Dewey Nicks	Sony Pictures Releasing	Screen Gems; Alliance Atlantis		$14 million	$6.4 million
2002	The Skulls II	Joe Chappelle	Universal Studios Home Video	Newmarket Capital Group	Direct-to-video	N/A	
2002	XXX	Rob Cohen	Sony Pictures Releasing	Columbia Pictures; Revolution Studios	Credited as Neal H. Moritz Production	$88.3 million	$277.4 million
2002	Sweet Home Alabama	Andy Tennant	Buena Vista Pictures	Touchstone Pictures		$30 million	$180.6 million
2003	Vegas Dick	Frederick King Keller	UPN	20th Century Fox Television	Television film	N/A	
2003	Static	Lee Perkins	N/A	Flat Out Films; Random Noise Productions	Short film	N/A	
2003	2 Fast 2 Furious	John Singleton	Universal Pictures	Mikona Productions GmbH & Co. KG	Credited as Neal H. Moritz Production	$76 million	$236.3 million
2003	S.W.A.T.	Clark Johnson	Sony Pictures Releasing	Columbia Pictures; Camelot Pictures; Chris Lee Productions		$70 million	$207.2 million
2003	Out of Time	Carl Franklin	MGM Distribution Co. (North America and select international territories); Focus Features (International)	Metro-Goldwyn-Mayer; Monarch Pictures		$50 million	$55.5 million
2004	Torque	Joseph Kahn	Warner Bros. Pictures	Village Roadshow Pictures		$40 million	$46.5 million
2004	The Skulls III	J. Miles Dale	Universal Studios Home Video	Newmarket Films	Direct-to-video	N/A	
2004	Cruel Intentions 3	Scott Ziehl	Columbia TriStar Home Entertainment	Newmarket Films	Direct-to-video	N/A	
2005	XXX: State of the Union	Lee Tamahori	Sony Pictures Releasing	Columbia Pictures; Revolution Studios		$113.1 million	$71.1 million
2005	Devour	David Winkler	Sony Pictures Home Entertainment	Newmarket Films; Bigel Entertainment	Direct-to-video	N/A	
2005	Stealth	Rob Cohen	Sony Pictures Releasing	Columbia Pictures; Phoenix Pictures; Laura Ziskin Productions		$135 million	$76.9 million
2006	The Fast and the Furious: Tokyo Drift	Justin Lin	Universal Pictures	Relativity Media	Credited as Neal H. Moritz Production	$85 million	$159 million
2006	Click	Frank Coraci	Sony Pictures Releasing	Columbia Pictures; Revolution Studios; Happy Madison Productions		$82.5 million	$240.7 million
2006	I'll Always Know What You Did Last Summer	Sylvain White	Sony Pictures Home Entertainment	Destination Films; Mandalay Pictures	Direct-to-video	N/A	
2006	Gridiron Gang	Phil Joanou	Sony Pictures Releasing	Columbia Pictures; Relativity Media		$30 million	$41 million
2007	Evan Almighty	Tom Shadyac	Universal Pictures	Relativity Media; Spyglass Entertainment; Shady Acres Entertainment		$175 million	$173.4 million
2007	I Am Legend	Francis Lawrence	Warner Bros. Pictures	Village Roadshow Pictures; Weed Road Pictures; Overbrook Entertainment; Heyday Films		$150 million	$585.3 million
2008	Vantage Point	Pete Travis	Sony Pictures Releasing	Columbia Pictures; Relativity Media		$40 million	$152 million
2008	Prom Night	Nelson McCormick	Sony Pictures Releasing	Screen Gems; Newmarket Films		$20 million	$57.2 million
2008	Made of Honor	Paul Weiland	Sony Pictures Releasing	Columbia Pictures; Relativity Media		$40 million	$106.4 million
2008	SIS	John Herzfeld	Spike	Shoot L.A. Crew; Sony Pictures Television	Television film	N/A	
2009	Fast & Furious	Justin Lin	Universal Pictures	Relativity Media; One Race Films		$85 million	$363.2 million
2010	The Bounty Hunter	Andy Tennant	Sony Pictures Releasing	Columbia Pictures; Relativity Media		$40–45 million	$136.3 million
2011	The Green Hornet	Michel Gondry	Sony Pictures Releasing	Columbia Pictures; Relativity Media		$120 million	$227.8 million
2011	S.W.A.T.: Firefight	Benny Boom	Sony Pictures Home Entertainment	Stage 6 Films; RCR Media Group	Direct-to-video	N/A	
2011	Battle: Los Angeles	Jonathan Liebesman	Sony Pictures Releasing	Columbia Pictures; Relativity Media		$100 million	$211.8 million
2011	Fast Five	Justin Lin	Universal Pictures	One Race Films		$125 million	$626.1 million
2011	The Change-Up	David Dobkin	Universal Pictures	Relativity Media; Big Kid Pictures		$52 million	$75.5 million
2012	21 Jump Street	Phil Lord; Christopher Miller	Sony Pictures Releasing	Columbia Pictures; Relativity Media; SJC Studios; Metro-Goldwyn-Mayer		$54.7 million	$201.5 million
2012	Total Recall	Len Wiseman	Sony Pictures Releasing	Columbia Pictures		$125 million	$198.5 million
2013	Jack the Giant Slayer	Bryan Singer	Warner Bros. Pictures	New Line Cinema; Legendary Pictures; Bad Hat Harry Productions		$195–220 million	$197.7 million
2013	Dead Man Down	Niels Arden Oplev	FilmDistrict	Frequency Films; IM Global; WWE Studios		$30 million	$18.1 million
2013	Fast & Furious 6	Justin Lin	Universal Pictures	Relativity Media; One Race Films		$160–260 million	$788.7 million
2013	R.I.P.D.	Robert Schwentke	Universal Pictures	Dark Horse Entertainment		$130–154 million	$78.3 million
2014	Search Party	Scot Armstrong	Focus World	Gold Circle Entertainment; American Work		N/A	$117,295
2014	22 Jump Street	Phil Lord; Christopher Miller	Sony Pictures Releasing	Columbia Pictures; LStar Capital; MRC; Cannell Studios; Storyville; 75 Year Plan Productions; Metro-Goldwyn-Mayer		$50–84.5 million	$331.3 million
2015	Furious 7	James Wan	Universal Pictures	MRC; One Race Films		$190–250 million	$1.515 billion
2015	Goosebumps	Rob Letterman	Sony Pictures Releasing	Columbia Pictures; Sony Pictures Animation; LStar Capital; Village Roadshow Pictures; Scholastic Entertainment		$58–84 million	$158.3 million
2016	Passengers	Morten Tyldum	Sony Pictures Releasing	Columbia Pictures; Village Roadshow Pictures; Start Motion Pictures; LStar Capital; Wanda Pictures; Company Films		$110–150 million	$303.1 million
2017	The Fate of the Furious	F. Gary Gray	Universal Pictures	One Race Films		$250 million	$1.236 billion
2017	S.W.A.T.: Under Siege	Tony Giglio	Sony Pictures Home Entertainment	Destination Films	Direct-to-video	N/A	
2018	Goosebumps 2: Haunted Halloween	Ari Sandel	Sony Pictures Releasing	Columbia Pictures; Sony Pictures Animation; Scholastic Entertainment; Silvertongue Films		$35 million	$93.3 million
2018	Hunter Killer	Donovan Marsh	Lionsgate	Summit Premiere; Millennium Media; Relativity Media; G-BASE; Tucker Tooley Entertainment		$40 million	$31.7 million
2019	Escape Room	Adam Robitel	Sony Pictures Releasing	Columbia Pictures		$9 million	$155.7 million
2019	The Art of Racing in the Rain	Simon Curtis	Walt Disney Studios Motion Pictures	20th Century Fox; Fox 2000 Pictures; Starbucks Entertainment; Shifting Gears Productions		$18 million	$33.8 million
2020	Sonic the Hedgehog	Jeff Fowler	Paramount Pictures	Sega Sammy Group; Marza Animation Planet; Blur Studio		$85–90 million	$319.7 million
2020	Spenser Confidential	Peter Berg	Netflix	Closest to the Hole Productions; Leverage Entertainment; Film 44		N/A	
2020	Bloodshot	David S. F. Wilson	Sony Pictures Releasing	Columbia Pictures; Bona Film Group; Cross Creek Pictures; Annabell Pictures; The Hideaway Entertainment; One Race Films; Valiant Entertainment		$45 million	$29.2 million
2021	F9	Justin Lin	Universal Pictures	One Race Films; Roth/Kirschenbaum Films; Perfect Storm Entertainment		$200–225 million	$726.2 million
2021	Escape Room: Tournament of Champions	Adam Robitel	Sony Pictures Releasing	Columbia Pictures		$15 million	$51.8 million
2022	Sonic the Hedgehog 2	Jeff Fowler	Paramount Pictures	Sega Sammy Group; Marza Animation Planet; Blur Studio		$90–110 million	$405.4 million
2022	The Princess	Le-Van Kiet	Disney Platform Distribution	20th Century Studios	Released on Hulu in United States and Disney+ internationally.	N/A	
2023	Fast X	Louis Leterrier	Universal Pictures	One Race Films; Roth/Kirschenbaum Films; Perfect Storm Entertainment		$340 million	$714.4 million
2024	Sonic the Hedgehog 3	Jeff Fowler	Paramount Pictures	Sega Sammy Group; Marza Animation Planet; Blur Studio		$122 million	$492.2 million
2025	I Know What You Did Last Summer	Jennifer Kaytin Robinson	Sony Pictures Releasing	Columbia Pictures; Screen Gems		$18 million	$64.8 million
2025	Afterburn	J. J. Perry	Inaugural Entertainment; Endurance Media	Endurance Media; Dogbone Entertainment		$56.7 million	$1.3 million
2026	Scary Movie	Michael Tiddes	Paramount Pictures	Miramax; Wayans Bros. Entertainment	Uncredited	$30 million	$231.4 million

=== Upcoming ===
Release date	Title	Distributor	Notes
March 19, 2027	Sonic the Hedgehog 4	Paramount Pictures	co-production with Sega Sammy Group, Marza Animation Planet and Blur Studio
May 7, 2027	Beach Read	Walt Disney Studios Motion Pictures	co-production with 20th Century Studios

=== Undated films ===
Release date	Title	Distributor	Notes	Production status
2027	Cliffhanger	Vertical	co-production with StudioCanal, Supernix, Thank You Pictures, and Rocket Science	Completed
TBA	Highlander	Amazon MGM Studios	co-production with United Artists, 87Eleven Entertainment, and Davis-Panzer Productions	Filming

== Television series ==
Year	Title	Creator	Network	Co-production companies	Notes	Seasons	Episodes
1999–2000	Shasta McNasty	Jeff Eastin	UPN	Columbia TriStar Television	Credited as Neal H. Moritz Productions	1	22
2001	Shotgun Love Dolls (aka StarBabes)	T. J. Scott	MTV	Alliance Atlantis	Unaired pilot starring Rachel McAdams	0	1
2002	Greg the Bunny	Steven Levitan; Spencer Chinoy; Dan Milano	Fox	Steven Levitan Productions; 20th Century Fox Television	Uncredited	1	13
2003–2005	Tru Calling	Jon Harmon Feldman	Fox	"Oh That Gus!", Inc. 20th Century Fox Television	Credited as Original Television	2	26
2005	Point Pleasant	John McLaughlin; Marti Noxon	Fox	20th Century Fox Television	Credited as Original Television	1	13
2005–2009; 2017	Prison Break	Paul Scheuring	Fox	Rat Entertainment (pilot); Adelstein/Parouse Productions (2005–2009); Adelstein Productions (2017); Dawn Olmstead Productions (2017); One Light Road Productions (2017); 20th Century Fox Television	Credited as Original Television (2005–2009)	5	90
2010–2013	The Big C	Darlene Hunt	Showtime	Perkins Street Productions; Sony Pictures Television		4	40
2013	Save Me	John Scott Shepherd	NBC	JSS Entertainment; Sony Pictures Television		1	13
2015	Cruel Intentions	film and developed by: Roger Kumble novel by: Pierre Choderlos de Laclos	NBC	Sony Pictures Television	Unaired pilot		1
2016–2019	Preacher	the comic book by: Garth Ennis; Steve Dillion developed by: Sam Catlin; Seth Rogen; Evan Goldberg	AMC	Woodbridge Productions (2016); KFL Nightsky Productions (2017); Short Drive Entertainment; Point Grey Pictures; Kickstart Productions; AMC Studios; Sony Pictures Television		4	43
2017–2025	S.W.A.T.	the 1975 series by: Robert Hammer; Rick Husky developed by: Shawn Ryan; Aaron Rahsaan Thomas	CBS	MiddKid Productions; ART Productions (2017–2021); Perfect Storm Entertainment; CBS Studios; Sony Pictures Television		7	141
2017–2019	Happy!	Grant Morrison; Darick Robertson	Syfy	Hypernormal (2019); Littleton Road; Universal Cable Productions		2	18
2019–2026	The Boys	the comic book by: Garth Ennis; Darick Robertson developed by: Eric Kripke	Amazon Prime Video	Kripke Enterprises; Point Grey Pictures; Kickstart Entertainment; KFL Nightsky Productions; Amazon MGM Studios; Sony Pictures Television		5	40
2019–2021	Fast & Furious: Spy Racers	characters by: Gary Scott Thompson	Netflix	DreamWorks Animation Television; Universal Pictures	Uncredited	6	52
2021	I Know What You Did Last Summer	novel by: Lois Duncan created by: Sara Goodman	Amazon Prime Video	Off Center, Inc. Mandalay Television; Atomic Monster; Amazon Studios; Sony Pictures Television Studios		1	8
2022	The Boys Presents: Diabolical	the comic book by: Garth Ennis; Darick Robertson created by: Eric Kripke; Simon Racioppa; Seth Rogen; Evan Goldberg	Amazon Prime Video	Kripke Enterprises; Point Grey Pictures; Titmouse, Inc. Amazon Studios; Sony Pictures Television Studios		1	8
2023–2025	Gen V	the comic books The Boys Volume 4 — ""We Gotta Go Now" adaptation" and G-Men by: Garth Ennis; Darick Robertson developed by: Michele Fazekas; Tara Butters	Amazon Prime Video	Kripke Enterprises; Point Grey Pictures; Fazekas & Butters; Kickstart Entertainment; KFL Nightsky Productions; Amazon Studios; Sony Pictures Television Studios		2	16
2023–2025	Goosebumps	characters by: R. L. Stine developed by: Nicholas Stoller; Rob Letterman	Disney+ Hulu	Stoller Global Solutions; Scholastic Entertainment; Gifted And Talented Camp (2025); Sony Pictures Television		2	18
2024	Knuckles	the video game series by: Sega developed by: John Whittington; Toby Ascher	Paramount+	Paramount Pictures; Sega Sammy Group		1	6
2024	Cruel Intentions	film by: Roger Kumble novel by: Pierre Choderlos de Laclos developed by: Phoebe Fisher; Sara Goodman	Amazon Prime Video	Off Center, Inc. AMBI Media Group; Amazon MGM Studios; Sony Pictures Television		1	8
2025	Long Bright River	novel by: Liz Moore created by: Nikki Toscano; Liz Moore	Peacock	Pascal Pictures; Black Mass Productions; Universal Content Productions; Sony Pictures Television		1	8
2026	Golden Axe	Based on Golden Axe by Sega	Paramount+	Chandyland; Important Science; Sony Pictures Television; Sega Sammy Group; Titmouse, Inc. CBS Eye Animation Productions		1	10
2026–present	S.W.A.T. Exiles	developed by: Jason Ning	Starz	Sony Pictures Television		1	10

=== Upcoming ===
Year	Title	Creator	Network	Co-production companies	Notes	Seasons	Episodes
2027	Vought Rising	the comic book by: Garth Ennis; Darick Robertson developed by: Paul Grellong	Amazon Prime Video	Kripke Enterprises; Point Grey Pictures; Kickstart Entertainment; KFL Nightsky Productions; Amazon MGM Studios; Sony Pictures Television		1	TBA
