= Cruel Intentions (franchise) =

Drama media franchise

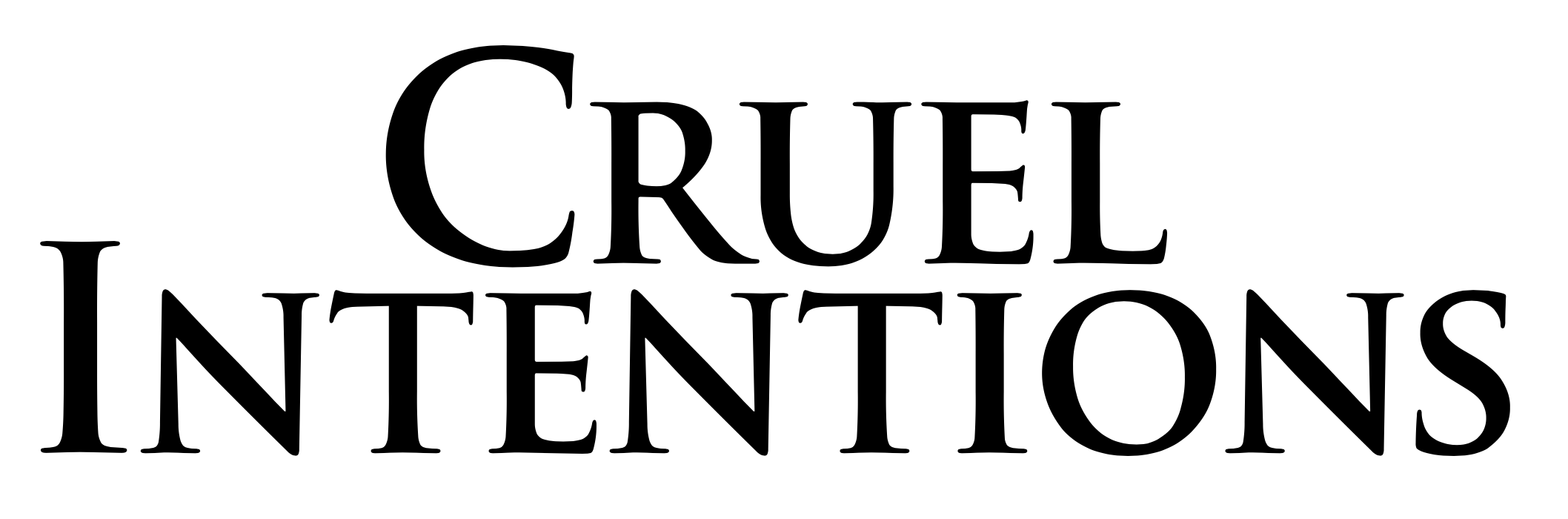
- Official franchise logo
- Created by: Roger Kumble
- Original work: Les Liaisons dangereuses (1782) by Pierre Choderlos de Laclos
- Owner: Sony Pictures Entertainment
- Years: 1999–2024

Films and television
- Film: Cruel Intentions (1999)
- Television series: Cruel Intentions (pilot, 2016); Cruel Intentions (2024)
- Direct-to-video: Cruel Intentions 2 (2000); Cruel Intentions 3 (2004)

Theatrical presentations
- Musical: Cruel Intentions: The '90s Musical

Audio
- Soundtracks: Cruel Intentions (1999); Music Inspired by the Film Cruel Intentions (2000); Cruel Intentions: The '90s Musical (2019); Cruel Intentions (2024)

Cruel Intentions is an American drama media franchise owned by Sony Pictures Entertainment, and consisting of three feature films and a television series. It is based on Pierre Choderlos de Laclos' 1782 novel Les Liaisons dangereuses, with all installments being modern retellings of the story.

== Films ==
Films	U.S. release date	Director	Screenwriter(s)	Producer(s)
Cruel Intentions	March 5, 1999	Roger Kumble	Roger Kumble	Neal H. Moritz
Cruel Intentions 2	March 13, 2001	Roger Kumble	Roger Kumble	Neal H. Moritz
Cruel Intentions 3	May 25, 2004	Scott Ziehl	Rhett Reese	Neal H. Moritz

=== Cruel Intentions (1999) ===
In New York City, wealthy teenager Sebastian Valmont regularly manipulates and seduces women, but wants to find someone who poses a challenge to his charm. He settles on Annette Hargrove—the daughter of his new school headmaster—who is staunchly opposed to sex before falling in love. Sebastian and his equally manipulative stepsister, the intelligent and popular Kathryn Merteuil, agree to a bet: if Sebastian fails to seduce Annette then Kathryn gets his vintage Jaguar XK140; if he wins Kathryn will finally have sex with him.

Kathryn also tries to recruit Sebastian into her own scheme to take revenge on her ex-boyfriend Court Reynolds, who left her because of her promiscuity and began dating the naive and innocent Cecile Caldwell.

=== Cruel Intentions 2 (2000) ===
Cruel Intentions 2 serves as a prequel to the first film.

Troublemaker student Sebastian Valmont is transferring to Manchester Prep following his father's new marriage to a wealthy divorcée. Upon his arrival in New York City, Sebastian discovers the wealth of his new family and first meets his deceitful and determined stepsister Kathryn Merteuil.

=== Cruel Intentions 3 (2004) ===
Jason Argyle and Patrick Bates are roommates at an exclusive Santa Barbara college. They pull off a devious plan where Patrick beds Kathryn's cousin, Cassidy Merteuil, to disrupts a potential relationship she had been pursuing with a British prince.

== Television ==
Series	Season	Episodes	First released	Last released	Showrunner(s)	Network(s)
Cruel Intentions	1	8	November 21, 2024		Phoebe Fisher and Sara Goodman	Amazon Prime Video

=== Canceled 1999 series ===
In 1999, Fox gave a straight-to-series order for a television series titled Manchester Prep, with Roger Kumble returning to write, executive produce and direct some episodes. 13 episodes were ordered for the 1999–2000 television season.

During production, there were conflicts between production company Columbia TriStar Television and the network due to creative concerns. Executives were also uncomfortable with the themes of teen sexuality and incest, while Rupert Murdoch, head of Fox parent News Corporation, was said to be outraged after seeing a news story about Manchester Prep that previewed a scene in which one of the young female characters is sexually aroused by a horse. When the project was canceled, only two episodes were already filmed.

The two episodes were edited together into the 2000 direct-to-video film Cruel Intentions 2, and additional scenes were filmed to close the story and to add sex scenes involving nudity.

In 2022, deleted scenes from the two episodes were uploaded on YouTube. In those scenes, Sarah Thompson's character is named Annette, and is implied to be the same character Reese Witherspoon was playing in the first film, confirming that the series was originally set to be a reimagining of the film, and was changed to a prequel when the project became a film, with her character changing name during the reshoots. In 2024, Sean Patrick Thomas, who played Ronald Clifford in the first film, revealed that he filmed scenes for the series and was playing a new character, Todd Michaels. He was cut from the project when it became a prequel film for continuity reasons.

=== 2016 sequel series pilot ===
In October 2015, NBC picked up a television pilot for a continuation of the film's storyline. The pilot was set seventeen years after the events of the film and sees Bash Casey, son of Sebastian Valmont and Annette Hargrove, discover his late father's journal. Upon discovering this, he is thrown into a world of lies, sex, and power. The potential series was to have Kathryn Merteuil, Bash's step-aunt, attempt to gain power of Valmont International.

In February 2016, Taylor John Smith and Samantha Logan were cast, with Smith playing the male lead role of Bash Casey. Sarah Michelle Gellar reached a deal with producers to reprise her role as the female lead, Kathryn Merteuil. In March, Kate Levering was cast to replace Reese Witherspoon for the role of Annette Hargrove.

Several months later, on October 31, NBC passed on the project and the series did not go forward.

=== Cruel Intentions (2024) ===
In October 2021, Amazon Studios announced that a new project was being developed with eight episodes later ordered for Amazon Prime Video. The television series is a reboot of the first film but is taking place in an entirely different setting from the original film.

It follows two step siblings at a Washington, D.C. college who have worked hard climbing the Greek life social ladder on campus. After a hazing incident goes wrong, however, the two will do anything it takes to maintain the status they have achieved and set their sights on seducing the Vice President's daughter.

In March 2025, Amazon Prime Video canceled the series after one season.

== Principal and recurring cast ==
Key
- A ^{P} indicates the actor appeared as their character through a photographic still.
- A dark gray cell indicates the character was not in the film.

Characters	Films			Pilot	Television series
Characters	Cruel Intentions	Cruel Intentions 2	Cruel Intentions 3	Cruel Intentions	Cruel Intentions
Characters	1999	2000	2004	2015	2024
Kathryn Merteuil	Sarah Michelle Gellar	Amy Adams		Sarah Michelle Gellar	
Sebastian Valmont	Ryan Phillippe	Robin Dunne		Ryan Phillippe^{P}	
Annette Hargrove	Reese Witherspoon			Kate Levering	
Cecile Caldwell	Selma Blair				
Blaine Tuttle	Joshua Jackson	Caley Wilson			
Greg McConnell	Eric Mabius				
Ronald Clifford	Sean Patrick Thomas				
Court Reynolds	Charlie O'Connell	Andrew Kraulis			
Helen Rosemond	Louise Fletcher				
Bunny Caldwell	Christine Baranski	Tané McClure			
Danielle Sherman		Sarah Thompson			
Cherie Claymon		Keri Lynn Pratt			
Edward Valmont		David McIlwraith		Peter Gallagher	
Jason Argyle			Kerr Smith		
Cassidy Merteuil			Kristina Anapau		
Patrick Bates			Nathan J. Wetherington		
Alison Lebray			Melissa Yvonne Lewis		
Sheila Wright			Natalie Ramsey		
Caroline Merteuil					Sarah Catherine Hook
Lucien Belmont					Zac Burgess
Annie Grover					Savannah Lee Smith
CeCe Carroway					Sara Silva
Blaise Powell					John Harlan Kim
Scott Russell					Khobe Clarke
Hank Chadwick					Sean Patrick Thomas
Beatrice Worth					Brooke Lena Johnson

== Additional crew and production details ==
Title	Crew/detail						
Title	Composer(s)	Cinematographer(s)	Editor(s)	Production companies	Distributing companies	Running time	
Title	Cruel Intentions	Edward Shearmur	Theo van de Sande	Jeff Freeman	Columbia Pictures; Original Film; Newmarket Capital Group	Columbia Pictures (Sony Pictures Releasing)	97 minutes
Cruel Intentions 2	P.J. Hanke	James R. Bagdonas	Bill Johnson; J. Benjamin Chulay; James Flynn	Original Film; Newmarket Films; Columbia TriStar Television (uncredited)	Columbia TriStar Home Video	87 minutes	
Cruel Intentions 3	David Reynolds	Thomas L. Calloway	Alan Cody	Original Film; Newmarket Capital Group	Columbia TriStar Home Entertainment	85 minutes	
Cruel Intentions (TV series)	Jeff Cardoni	David A. Makin; Michael Storey; Simon Chapman	Christopher S. Capp; Tony Solomons; Joseph Ettinger; Marc Pollon; Annette Davey	Off Center, Inc. Original Film; AMBI Media Group; Amazon MGM Studios; Sony Pictures Television	Amazon Prime Video	39–49 minutes (per episodes)	

== Reception ==
=== Box office performance ===
Film	Box office gross			Budget	Reference
Film	North America	Other territories	Worldwide	Budget	Reference
Cruel Intentions	$38,773,785	$37,573,641	$76,347,426	$10.5 million	

=== Critical and public response ===
Title	Rotten Tomatoes	Metacritic	CinemaScore
Cruel Intentions (1999)	53% (118 reviews)	56 (24 reviews)	B-
Cruel Intentions 2 (2000)	17% (12 reviews)		
Cruel Intentions 3 (2004)	50% (2 reviews)		
Cruel Intentions (TV series)	30% (10 reviews)	38 (8 reviews)	

== Music ==
Title	U.S. release date	Length	Performed by	Label
Cruel Intentions: Music From The Original Motion Picture	March 9, 1999	45	Various Artists	Virgin Records
Music Inspired by the Film Cruel Intentions: Suites and Themes from the Scores of John Ottman	November 20, 2000	60:04	John Ottman	Varèse Sarabande
Cruel Intentions: The '90s Musical - Original Cast Album	March 8, 2019	55:05	Various Artists	ABKCO Records
Cruel Intentions: Prime Video Original Series Soundtrack	November 21, 2024	51:45	Jeff Cardoni	Madison Gate Records

== Other media ==
=== Stage adaptation ===
A 2015 American jukebox musical with a score made up of hit songs from the 1990s. The musical's book is by Roger Kumble, Lindsey Rosin and Jordan Ross. After successful performances in Los Angeles and New York, the show made its Off-Broadway debut at Greenwich Village nightclub Le Poisson Rouge in November 2017. The show was the first theater production ever staged there, which offered bar and table service. Originally scheduled for a ten-week engagement, the show was extended three times, through April 2018.

The show had its UK debut in August 2019 at the Palais du Variété Spiegeltent at Assembly George Square Gardens, part of the Edinburgh Fringe festival, starring Dominic Andersen as Sebastian and Rebecca Gilhooley as Kathryn Merteuil, produced by Bill Kenwright. The show opened at The Other Palace in London in January 2024, where it was scheduled to run until May, starring Daniel Bravo as Sebastian and Rhianne-Louise McCaulsky as Kathryn.
