= Cruel Intentions (disambiguation) =

Cruel Intentions is a 1999 film, followed by two sequels.

Cruel Intentions may also refer to:

- Cruel Intentions (franchise), a media franchise
- Cruel Intentions (soundtrack), 1999
- Cruel Intentions (pilot), an unaired 2016 pilot intended as a sequel to the 1999 film
- Cruel Intentions (EP), by Tory Lanez, 2015
- "Cruel Intentions" (Simian Mobile Disco song), 2010
- "Cruel Intentions", a song by JMSN, 2016
- Cruel Intentions (TV series), a 2024 American television series
