= Kathryn Merteuil =

- Cruel Intentions character
- Kathryn Merteuil as portrayed by Sarah Michelle Gellar in Cruel Intentions.
- First appearance: Cruel Intentions (1999)
- Last appearance: Cruel Intentions 2 (2000)
- Created by: Pierre Choderlos de Laclos
- Adapted by: Roger Kumble
- Portrayed by: Sarah Michelle Gellar (1999); Amy Adams (2000); Katie Stevens (musical; 2015)

In-universe information
- Gender: Female
- Occupation: High school student (at Manchester Prep; departed)
- Family: Unnamed father (father); Tiffany Merteuil (mother); Edward Valmont (stepfather); Sebastian Valmont (maternal stepbrother; deceased); Cassidy Merteuil (cousin)
- Religion: None (Atheism, fakes being Christian publicly)
- Nationality: American
- Residence: Upper East Side; Manhattan, New York

Kathryn Merteuil is a fictional character from the Cruel Intentions franchise, created for it by Roger Kumble based on the Marquise Isabelle de Merteuil from Pierre Choderlos de Laclos's 1782 novel Les Liaisons dangereuses.

Merteuil serves as the primary antagonist of the franchise. The character was first portrayed by Sarah Michelle Gellar in Cruel Intentions (1999). Gellar briefly reprised the role in 2016 in an unaired pilot for a potential sequel television series that was passed on by NBC. A younger version of the character was portrayed by Amy Adams in the direct-to-video prequel film Cruel Intentions 2 (2000). Merteuil is also one of the protagonists in the jukebox musical adaptation of the first film, a role originated by Katie Stevens and later portrayed by various actresses over time.

== Storylines ==
=== Cruel Intentions ===
In the film, Kathryn is wealthy, beautiful and popular, part of the Upper East Side's social elite. Portrayed as a manipulative mastermind who uses and destroys people for her own amusement, she is also depicted as being addicted to cocaine, which she hides in her rosary, and it is suggested that she has bulimia. She hides her true nature behind the facade of a deeply religious model student, fooling everyone she knows, except for her equally narcissistic step-brother Sebastian Valmont (Ryan Phillippe) and ex-boyfriend Court Reynolds (Charlie O'Connell). Kathryn shows signs of sociopathic and callous behaviour, treating the death of her supposedly "beloved" step-brother with cold disdain, and gleefully enjoying destroying his life, as well as those of the people she perceives as threats or inferior to her. She has a strong superiority complex, but the extent of her interest in Sebastian is left ambiguous. Kathryn is the archetypal "ice princess" whose opulent bedroom is a cold, dark lair decorated in royal blue and silver with crystal embellishments. When she's not wearing black, gray or other dark, muted colors, she occasionally wears icy blue.

In the film, she's first seen discussing her prep school with Mrs. Caldwell (Christine Baranski) and her daughter, Cecile (Selma Blair). Kathryn promises Mrs. Caldwell that she will look out for the sheltered and naive Cecile. However, she reveals to Sebastian that her real intention is to use Cecile to take revenge on Court, who had dumped her for Cecile. Kathryn asks Sebastian to seduce Cecile, yet he refuses as he is planning to seduce virgin Annette Hargrove (Reese Witherspoon), the daughter of their school's new headmaster. The two make a wager: Kathryn believes he cannot get Annette to bed, yet Sebastian believes he can. If Kathryn wins, she gets Sebastian's vintage Jaguar XK140; if Sebastian wins, Kathryn will have sex with him and she tells him he can "put it anywhere", a sexual reference meaning he can do anything he wants to her during the sex session.

After numerous failed attempts of seducing Annette, Sebastian agrees to seduce Cecile. Cecile confesses to Kathryn that her music teacher, Ronald Clifford (Sean Patrick Thomas), is in love with her. Afterwards Kathryn tells Mrs. Caldwell about Ronald and Cecile's romance and Mrs. Caldwell intervenes in their relationship. Sebastian, in turn, calls Cecile to his house, ostensibly to give her a letter from Ronald. There, he blackmails Cecile and performs oral sex on her. The next day, Cecile confides in Kathryn, who advises her to learn from Sebastian so that she can please Ronald in bed.

After Sebastian sleeps with Annette, Kathryn offers herself to Sebastian as he has won the bet, but he refuses; he has fallen in love with Annette. Kathryn begins showing signs of possessiveness towards Sebastian, and it is suggested that she is truly in love with him, in her way. The next day, Kathryn taunts him and threatens to ruin Annette's reputation, so Sebastian feigns indifference to Annette and breaks up with her. After Sebastian tells Kathryn that he has broken up with Annette and arranged for Cecile and Ronald to be together, Kathryn reveals that she has known all along that he was truly in love with Annette and manipulated him into giving her up. Kathryn knows that he came to make plans for them to have sex and rejects him. Once he leaves, Kathryn calls Ronald to tell him that Sebastian slept with Cecile and (falsely) inform him that Sebastian hit her. This false information leads Ronald to attack Sebastian, resulting in Sebastian's death. Only when he watches Sebastian and Annette profess their love before his death, Ronald realizes that Kathryn lied to him. At Sebastian's funeral, Kathryn tries to maintain her reputation by trying to make an example of Sebastian. Her former friends and everyone else furiously reject her by leaving and humiliating her in the process. Kathryn's spotless reputation is ruined when Cecile distributes copies of Sebastian's private journal, made into a book by Annette, titled "Cruel Intentions", which details her manipulations. Her fall from grace does not end there, as Ronald had made a detailed written confession about her involvement and how she lied to him about Cecile no longer being a virgin in order for him to kill Sebastian. This is made worse when Headmaster Hargrove finds her rosary and discovers drugs hidden in it; her spotless record is ruined. It's also implied that Kathryn will be expelled and disgraced by her own family.

=== Cruel Intentions 2 ===
The straight-to-video prequel to the original film tells the story of Kathryn's younger years. The film reveals that Kathryn was born to Tiffany Merteuil (Mimi Rogers), a well-respected New York socialite. However, the prequel features several inconsistencies in its relation to the first film, such as the backstory concerning Kathryn's mother and Kathryn's meanspirited behavior, due to the film's origins as a TV series rather than a prequel. Kathryn attends Manchester Prep, a prestigious co-educational private school on the outskirts of the city. As in the first film, she manipulates and controls everyone around her, even seducing her school's assistant headmaster, and then blackmailing him into letting her do whatever she wants. After her new step-brother Sebastian Valmont (Robin Dunne) and his father move in, Kathryn becomes jealous as Sebastian bests her in both piano and vocabulary.

The next day, at a school assembly, Kathryn, who is the student body president, delivers a speech to her classmates, but is interrupted by uncontrollable hiccups coming from a student, who then begins to choke on the gum that she was chewing in a bid to stop her hiccups. She is saved by the quick action of another fellow student, who performs the Heimlich maneuver, allowing the student to expel the gum, which ends up flying into Kathryn's hair. Afterwards Kathryn calls a meeting of the secret society of student elites, deciding upon the fate of the new students. This leads them to Cherie (Keri Lynn Pratt), the student with the hiccups, as well as the discovery that Cherie's family is wealthier than Kathryn's; this, and the events of the assembly, cause Kathryn to seek a vendetta against Cherie.

The next night, Kathryn calls Cherie, asking if she would like to attend a school event with her. She takes Cherie to a popular nightclub, and tricks her into drinking several Long Island Ice Teas. After getting the attention of a male club goer, Kathryn tells Cherie he clearly likes her and that she should have sex with him. Yet her plan fails once Cherie throws up on the young man's feet. After Sebastian angers Kathryn, whose day is interrupted by not being able to contact her driver, she conducts a plan to make him similar to her, and begins thinking on how she can mold Sebastian into a heartless womanizer. She starts by interfering with Sebastian's attempts to woo his classmate Danielle (Sarah Thompson). Kathryn first tries to tempt him away from Danielle by luring him with identical twins, who confide to Sebastian that Danielle is the only virgin at Manchester and she plans not to have sex with anyone unless she is truly in love.

Kathryn continues her attempt to sabotage Cherie, but it backfires, as Kathryn's mother tells her to become best friends with Cherie, in an attempt to encourage Cherie's mother to donate a large amount of money to the school. Sebastian soon professes his love for Danielle, only to find that she does not reciprocate. It turns out that Danielle is actually secretly working alongside Kathryn and is helping fulfill her secret plan to dupe Sebastian. Defeated by Kathryn's manipulation, a heartbroken Sebastian states he will never fall in love again; afterwards, he makes an alliance with Kathryn to dominate and manipulate others. She then tells Sebastian he should start with Cherie.

=== Cruel Intentions 3 ===
While Kathryn herself does not appear in the third film in the franchise, the main character in this film - Kathryn's equally manipulative cousin Cassidy Merteuil (Kristina Anapau) - reveals that Kathryn is currently a patient in a methadone clinic.

=== Unaired sequel series pilot ===
Kathryn was set to return in a television series continuation of the first film, with Sarah Michelle Gellar reprising the role. NBC passed on the project after a pilot order and it did not go forward. However, the pilot leaked online several years later.

In the unaired pilot episode, Kathryn is now sober and married to a wealthy man, Pascall Barrett (Coby Bell). Having put the scandal of her youth behind her, she works for a youth rehabilitation program and tries to gain power at Valmont International, the company owned by Sebastian's father, Edward Valmont (Peter Gallagher). She also cheats on her husband with her chief of staff, Carmen Castillo (Nathalie Kelley). When Sebastian and Annette's child, Bash Casey (Taylor John Smith), discover his father's past and the existence of the Valmont's family, he meet with Edward who confirm that Bash is truly his grandson and welcome him into their world of wealth and business. Kathryn's life is disrupted by Bash's arrival and the episode finishes with her returning to her old self and using her old rosary to take drugs.

== Characterization ==
Kathleen Sweeney sees Kathryn as one of "Hollywood's Bad Girls", a stock character that Sweeney regards as appearing first in Veronica Sawyer (Winona Ryder) in the 1988 film Heathers. Sweeney suggests that 1999 "gave viewers two manipulative dark-haired Queen Bees": Kathryn Merteuil in Cruel Intentions and Courtney Shayne (Rose McGowan) in Jawbreaker. Sweeney notes that in both films, "the Queens of Mean are punished by their peers, but not before laying out the game plan for wielding power in high school as visual "how-to" manuals for aspiring Queen Bees everywhere". Kathryn, Sweeney suggests, "maintains a Straight-A Uber Girl persona of innocence until the very end". Samantha Lindop classifies Merteuil as a fille fatale (a young femme fatale) and compares her to Adrian Forrester (Alicia Silverstone) in The Crush.

Richard Burt suggests that Kathryn is "punished for being beautiful and smart" in that she "can't keep guys from dumping her for stupider girls". Burt goes on to note that Merteuil is a "bitch" who is "incapable of love" and "ultimately humiliated for her destructive nastiness".

Gellar's portrayal of Kathryn was parodied in the 2001 film Not Another Teen Movie, in which Mia Kirshner played Catherine Wyler, "The Cruelest Girl in School".
