= Cruel Intentions (pilot) =

2016 television pilot

- Genre: Drama
- Based on: Cruel Intentions by Roger Kumble; Les Liaisons dangereuses by Pierre Choderlos de Laclos
- Written by: Roger Kumble; Lindsey Rosin; Jordan Ross
- Directed by: Roger Kumble
- Starring: Sarah Michelle Gellar; Taylor John Smith; Peter Gallagher; Coby Bell; Samantha Logan; Sophina Brown; Nathalie Kelley; Kate Levering; Duane Henry; Anne Winters; Taylor Zakhar Perez
- Music by: Edward Shearmur
- Country of origin: United States
- Original language: English
- No. of episodes: 1

Production
- Executive producers: Becky Hartman Edwards; Roger Kumble; Neal H. Moritz; Pavun Shetty; Sarah Michelle Gellar
- Editors: Jeff Granzow; Robert Ivison
- Camera setup: Single-camera
- Running time: 45 minutes
- Production companies: Original Film; Sony Pictures Television

Related
- Cruel Intentions

Cruel Intentions is an unaired television pilot produced by Original Film and Sony Pictures Television for NBC. Part of the franchise of the same name, the pilot serves as a direct sequel to the 1999 film by Roger Kumble, which is based on the 1782 French novel Les Liaisons dangereuses by Pierre Choderlos de Laclos.

The Cruel Intentions pilot was expected to debut in 2016, but NBC opted not to buy the series. It was directed and co-written by Kumble, with Neal H. Moritz, who produced the original film and sequels, also serving as an executive producer. It stars Sarah Michelle Gellar, reprising her role of Kathryn Merteuil from the film.

The pilot was the second attempt to adapt the franchise as a television series after the 1999 Fox series that was canceled during filming and later retooled as the 2000 direct-to-video prequel film Cruel Intentions 2. A third project, also titled Cruel Intentions, was given a series order at Amazon Prime Video and premiered in November 2024, but was canceled after one season.

== Plot ==
The pilot is set seventeen years after the events of the film and sees Bash Casey, son of Sebastian Valmont and Annette Hargrove, discover his late father's journal. Upon discovering this he is thrown into a world of lies, sex and power. The potential series included the character of Kathryn Merteuil, Bash's step-aunt, who would try to gain power of Valmont International.

== Cast and characters ==
- Sarah Michelle Gellar as Kathryn Merteuil. Now sober and married to a wealthy man, she works for a youth rehabilitation program after putting the scandal of her youth behind her. Her life is disrupted however after the arrival of her step-nephew Bash.
- Taylor John Smith as Bash Casey, son of Sebastian and Annette who was previously unaware of his father's wild history.
- Peter Gallagher as Edward Valmont, the billionaire father to the late Sebastian Valmont. After confirming that Bash is truly his grandson he wastes no time welcoming him into a world of wealth and business. Gallagher replaces David McIlwraith, who portrayed the character in Cruel Intentions 2.
- Coby Bell as Pascall Barrett, husband to Kathryn and a top lawyer who plots with his wife to manipulate Bash.
- Samantha Logan as Cassidy Barrett, Pascall's daughter and Kathryn's step-daughter.
- Sophina Brown as Naomi Donovan, Pascal's ex-wife and Cassidy's mother who is an aspiring congresswoman.
- Nathalie Kelley as Carmen Castillo, Kathryn's chief of staff and lover.
- Kate Levering as Annette Hargrove-Casey, mother to Bash who shares a history with Kathryn. Levering replaces Reese Witherspoon, who portrayed the character in the film.
- Duane Henry as Sullivan, Edward's bodyguard
- Anne Winters as Valerie York, Cassidy's best friend.
- Taylor Zakhar Perez as Mateo De La Vega, a friend of Cassidy.

== Production ==
The series pilot, a direct sequel to the 1999 film Cruel Intentions, was co-written by the film's writer-director Roger Kumble and Lindsey Rosin and Jordan Ross, who created Cruel Intentions: The '90s Musical. Kumble directed the pilot, which he executive produced with the film's producer Neal H. Moritz.

In February 2016, producers were in talks with Gellar to reprise her role of Kathryn Merteuil from the film. That month, Taylor John Smith and Samantha Logan were both cast, with Smith playing the male lead role of Bash Casey. Gellar reached a deal with producers to join the show.

Several months later, on October 31, NBC passed on the project, but Sony Pictures Television was shopping the pilot with other networks. During an interview in 2022, Gellar revealed that she was grateful that the series was not picked up by NBC, as she felt that a Cruel Intentions series was more suited for a streaming service and did not work as a network show.

In 2021, a third adaptation of the franchise into a television series was announced by Amazon Studios. The series premiered in November 2024 on Amazon Prime Video but was canceled after one season.
