= Les Liaisons dangereuses =

1782 epistolary novel by Pierre Choderlos de Laclos

Dangerous Liaisons
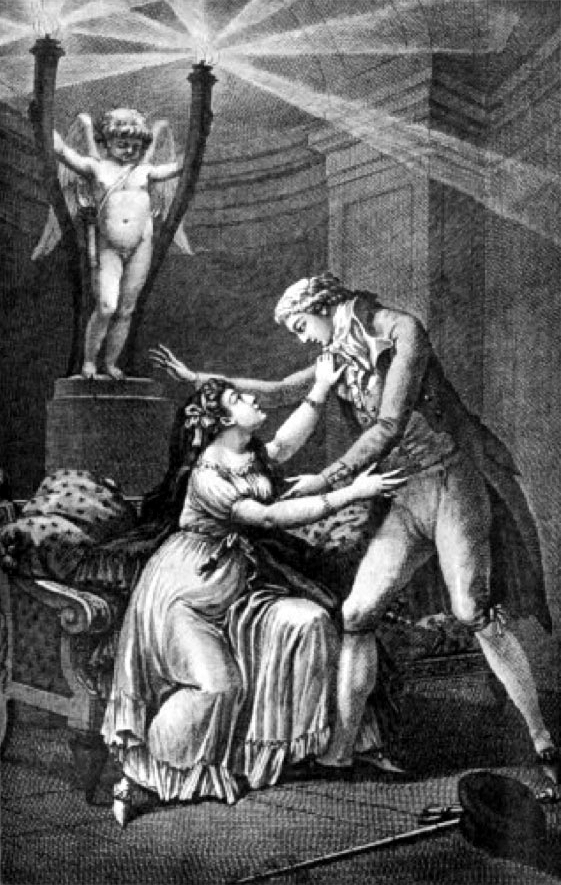
- Illustration from 1796 edition
- Author: Pierre Choderlos de Laclos
- Original title: Les Liaisons dangereuses
- Translator: P. W. K. Stone
- Illustrator: Jean-Honoré Fragonard
- Language: French
- Genre: Epistolary novel, libertine novel
- Publisher: Durand Neveu
- Publication date: 23 March 1782
- Publication place: France
- English publication date: 1812
- Media type: Print (Paperback)
- Pages: 400
- OCLC: 52565525

Les Liaisons dangereuses (French: [le ljɛzɔ̃ dɑ̃ʒ(ə)ʁøz]; English: Dangerous Liaisons) is a French epistolary novel by Pierre Choderlos de Laclos, first published in four volumes by Durand Neveu on 23 March 1782. It was initially translated into English in 1812 and has since been widely recognized as one of the most important early French novels. It is also considered one of the earliest and most famous examples of a roman à clef, written by Laclos as a thinly disguised takedown of the French aristocracy.

It is the story of the Marquise de Merteuil and the Vicomte de Valmont, two amoral lovers-turned-rivals who amuse themselves by ruining others and who ultimately destroy each other.

It has been seen as depicting the corruption and depravity of the French nobility shortly before the French Revolution, and thereby attacking the Ancien Régime despite having been written nearly a decade prior to those events. The author aspired to "write a work which departed from the ordinary, which made a noise, and which would remain on earth after his death".

As an epistolary novel, the book is composed of letters written by the various characters to each other. In particular, the letters between Valmont and the Marquise make up the majority of the plot, along with those of Cécile de Volanges and Madame de Tourvel.

It has been adapted multiple times, including the successful 1985 play and subsequent award-winning 1988 film adaptation.

== Plot summary ==
The Marquise de Merteuil is determined to corrupt the young Cécile de Volanges, whose mother has only recently brought her out of a convent to be married to Merteuil's previous lover, who has discarded her rudely. At the same time the notorious Vicomte de Valmont is determined to seduce the virtuous, married, and therefore inaccessible Madame de Tourvel, who is staying with his aunt while her husband is away on a court case. Cécile falls in love with the Chevalier Danceny (her young music tutor), and Merteuil and Valmont pretend to help the secret lovers in order to gain their trust and manipulate them later to benefit their own schemes.

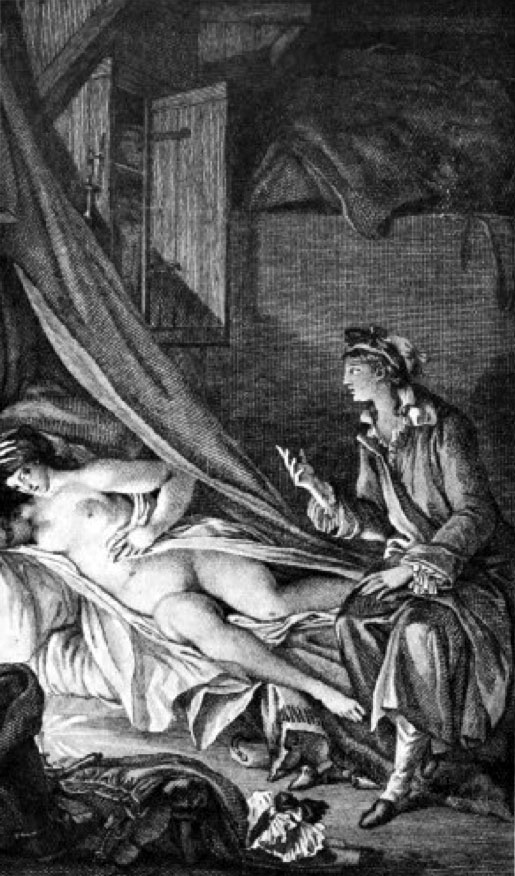
Illustration by Fragonard for Letter XLIV, 1796

Merteuil first suggests that the Vicomte should seduce Cécile in order to enact her revenge on Cécile's future husband but Valmont refuses, finding the challenge too easy and preferring to devote himself to seducing Madame de Tourvel. He is however interested in resuming their affair. Merteuil promises Valmont that if he seduces Madame de Tourvel and provides her with written proof of seduction, she will spend the night with him.

Valmont befriends Tourvel by convincing her that he has changed his rakish ways and become a virtuous man, but he finds seducing her to be a far greater challenge than his previous conquests.

Valmont is infuriated on discovering that Cécile's mother has written to Madame de Tourvel to warn her about his bad character. He avenges himself by seducing and raping Cécile as Merteuil had suggested. Meanwhile, Merteuil takes Danceny as her lover.

By the time Valmont has succeeded in seducing Madame de Tourvel, he seems to have fallen in love with her. Jealous, Merteuil tricks him into deserting Madame de Tourvel, and reneges on her promise of spending the night with him. In retaliation, Valmont reveals that he prompted Danceny to reunite with Cécile, leaving Merteuil abandoned yet again. Merteuil declares war on Valmont and reveals to Danceny that Valmont has seduced Cécile.

Danceny and Valmont duel, and Valmont is fatally wounded. Before he dies, he gives Danceny the letters proving Merteuil's own involvement. These letters are sufficient to ruin her reputation, and she flees to the countryside, after contracting smallpox. Her face is left permanently scarred and she is rendered blind in one eye. She loses her greatest asset, her beauty, as well as her reputation and much of her fortune. Desperate with guilt and grief, Madame de Tourvel succumbs to a fever and dies, while Cécile returns to the convent, dishonoured.

== Characters ==
Correspondents

- Madame de Volanges
- Cécile de Volanges
- Marquise de Merteuil
- Vicomte de Valmont
- Madame de Tourvel
- Chevalier Danceny
- Comte de Gercourt
- Father Anselme, priest of the Feuillant Convent
- Monsieur Bertrand, Valmont's steward

Referred to or quoted

- Président de Tourvel
- Sophie Carnay, Cécile's convent friend
- Joséphine, portress of the convent
- Roux Azolan, Valmont's huntsman
- Julie, Tourvel's maid
- Victoire, Merteuil's maid
- Madame de Rosemonde, Valmont's aunt
- Émilie, courtesan and mistress of Valmont
- Chevalier de Belleroche, Merteuil's lover
- Prévan, military officer and roué

== Literary significance and criticism ==
Les Liaisons dangereuses is celebrated for its exploration of seduction, revenge and malice, presented in the form of fictional letters collected and published by a fictional author. The book was viewed as scandalous at the time of its publication, though the real intentions of the author remain unknown. It has been suggested that Laclos's intention was the same as that of his fictional author in the novel: to write a morality tale about the French nobility of the Ancien Régime. The theory has been questioned as Laclos enjoyed the patronage of France's most senior aristocrat—Louis Philippe II, Duke of Orléans. All the characters in the story are aristocrats, including the virtuous ones like Madame de Tourvel and Madame de Rosemonde and many royalist and conservative figures enjoyed the book, including Queen Marie Antoinette, which suggests that—despite its scandalous reputation—it was not viewed as a political work until the French Revolution made it appear as such, with the benefit of hindsight.

Wayland Young notes that most critics have viewed the work as

... a sort of celebration, or at least a neutral statement, of libertinism... pernicious and damnable... Almost everyone who has written about it has noted how perfunctory are the wages of sin..."

He argues that

... the mere analysis of libertinism… carried out by a novelist with such a prodigious command of his medium... was enough to condemn it and play a large part in its destruction.

In a well-known essay on Les Liaisons dangereuses, which has often been used as a preface to French editions of the novel, André Malraux argues that, despite its debt to the libertine tradition, Les Liaisons dangereuses is more significant as the introduction of a new kind of character in French fiction. Malraux writes that the Marquise de Merteuil and the Vicomte de Valmont are creations "without precedent"; they are "the first [in European literature] whose acts are determined by an ideology".

Les Liaisons dangereuses is a literary counter-thesis to the epistolary novel as exemplified by Richardson's Pamela; or, Virtue Rewarded. Whereas Richardson uses the technique of letters to provide the reader with a feeling of knowing the protagonist's true and intimate thoughts, Laclos' use of this literary device is the opposite: by presenting the reader with grossly conflicting views from the same writer when addressing different recipients, it is left to the reader to reconcile story, intentions and characters behind the letters. The use of duplicitous characters with one virtuous face can be viewed as a complex criticism of the immensely popular naïve moral epistolary novel.

== Adaptations ==
The novel has been adapted into various media, under many different names.

=== Live performance ===
==== Stage ====
- German playwright Heiner Müller adapted the story in 1981, entitling it Quartet.
- Christopher Hampton's 1985 adaptation, Les Liaisons Dangereuses, opened in London's West End and in 1987 crossed over to Broadway with Alan Rickman originating the role of the Vicomte de Valmont, Lindsay Duncan as Marquise de Merteuil, and Juliet Stevenson as Madame de Tourvel. In 2012 the Sydney Theatre Company staged Hampton's adaptation with Hugo Weaving as the Vicomte, and Pamela Rabe as the Marquise.
- In 2012, John Malkovich directed a version of the play with Paris' Théâtre de l'Atelier.
- In 2015, Josie Rourke directed a revival of the Christopher Hampton version at the Donmar Warehouse in London with Dominic West as the Vicomte and Janet McTeer as the Marquise. The production was broadcast on National Theatre Live and later ran at the Booth Theatre on Broadway with Liev Schreiber replacing West.
- Cruel Intentions: The '90s Musical, a jukebox musical based on the 1999 film that premiered in Los Feliz in 2015. The show later premiered off-Broadway in 2017 and was followed by a national tour and productions in other countries, including an off-West End productions in 2024.

==== Opera ====
- The Dangerous Liaisons (1994), by the American composer Conrad Susa, commissioned by the San Francisco Opera. The opera was also aired on television in 1994 under the direction of Gary Halvorson and starring Frederica von Stade, Thomas Hampson, and Renée Fleming
- Les liaisons dangereuses (1996) by Belgian composer Piet Swerts
- Quartett (2011), by Italian composer Luca Francesconi, commissioned by La Scala

==== Ballet ====
- David Nixon, currently artistic director of Northern Ballet Theatre in Leeds, choreographed a ballet version of Dangerous Liaisons, with music by Vivaldi. It was first performed as part of a mixed program entitled "David Nixon's Liaisons" at the Hebbel Theatre, Berlin in 1990. He subsequently reworked it for BalletMet, with the premier taking place in the Ohio Theatre on May 2, 1996.
- In 2003, English National Ballet commissioned choreographer Michael Corder and composer Julian Philips to create a new full-length ballet based on Les Liaisons Dangereuses. The project was cancelled before it came to the stage, and the full score has yet to be premiered. Philips later adapted a section of the ballet as his chamber orchestral work Divertissement (2004).
- In 2008, the Alberta Ballet performed a ballet version of Dangerous Liaisons.
- In 2014, the Czech National Theatre Ballet produced Valmont, choreographer Libor Vaculík's adaptation of Dangerous Liaisons, featuring music by Schubert and Latvian composer Pēteris Vasks.
- In 2019, Queensland Ballet premiered their new production of Dangerous Liaisons, choreographed by Liam Scarlett and featuring music by Camille Saint-Saëns.

=== Recorded and printed media ===
==== Film ====
- Les Liaisons dangereuses (1959), directed by Roger Vadim and starring Jeanne Moreau, Gérard Philipe and Annette Vadim. In this version, Vadim updated the story to a late-1950s French bourgeois milieu.
- Une femme fidèle (1976). A loose retelling also directed by Roger Vadim and set in 1870.
- Dangerous Liaisons (1988), directed by Stephen Frears and starring Glenn Close, John Malkovich, Michelle Pfeiffer and Uma Thurman, based on Hampton's play and set in the 18th century around Paris. It was nominated for multiple Academy Awards including Best Picture.
- Valmont (1989), directed by Miloš Forman and starring Annette Bening, Colin Firth and Meg Tilly.
- Cruel Intentions (1999), directed by Roger Kumble and starring Sarah Michelle Gellar, Ryan Phillippe, Selma Blair and Reese Witherspoon, relocates the story to modern-day New York and is set amongst upper-class high school teens. This film spawned a media franchise with both a prequel in 2000 and a standalone sequel in 2004.
- Untold Scandal (2003), directed by E J-yong and starring Lee Mi-sook, Jeon Do-yeon and Bae Yong-joon, transposes the setting to 18th-century Korea.
- Dangerous Liaisons (2012), directed by Hur Jin-ho and starring Zhang Ziyi, Jang Dong-gun and Cecilia Cheung, is set in 1930s China.
- Dangerous Liaisons (2022), directed by Rachel Suissa and starring Simon Rérolle, Paola Locatelli and Ella Pellegrini, is set in Biarritz.

==== Books ====
- A Factory of Cunning (2005), a fictionalized sequel by Philippa Stockley. It tells how the Marquise de Merteuil faked her death of smallpox and escaped to England with a new identity.
- Dangerous Tweets (2013), the entire novel adapted into tweets (one tweet per letter) in English as an iBook.
- Unforgivable Love (2017), a novel by Sophfronia Scott and a retelling of the story set in 1940s Harlem with an African-American cast of characters.
- Where the Vile Things Are (November 2021), a novel by Marcus James, is a humorous modernization of the 1782 novel, each letter faithfully adapted in emails, DMs, and hand-written letters. The novel deals with homophobia, misogyny, privilege and fake "wokeness", and the rise of the alt-right during the 2016 presidential elections.

==== Television ====
- Les Liaisons dangereuses (1980), a French television film directed by Claude Barma, starring Claude Degliame, Jean-Pierre Bouvier and Maïa Simon.
- Nebezpečné známosti (1980), a Slovak television film by Czechoslovak Television, directed by Miloslav Luther, starring Juraj Kukura, Emília Vášáryová, Jana Nagyová, Soňa Valentová.
- Perro amor (1998), a Colombian television series starring Danna García and Julián Arango.
- Les Liaisons dangereuses (2003), a French television miniseries directed by Josée Dayan and starring Catherine Deneuve, Rupert Everett, Leelee Sobieski and Nastassja Kinski, which relocates the story to the 1960s.
- In 2012, a fictional musical version titled as Liaisons was the subject of few episodes on the NBC TV show Smash. Two songs were written by Marc Shaiman and Scott Wittman called "A Letter from Cecile" performed by Megan Hilty as Cecile de Volanges and "Ce N'Est Pas Ma Faute (It's Not My Fault)" performed by Sean Hayes as Vicomte de Valmont.
- In the It's Always Sunny in Philadelphia episode "Charlie and Dee Find Love" (2012), Dennis Reynolds references Les Liaisons dangereuses after concluding that wealthy siblings Ruby and Trevor Taft are using Charlie Kelly and Dee Reynolds as pawns in an elaborate social game designed to humiliate them.
- Ligações Perigosas (2016), a Brazilian television miniseries starring Patrícia Pillar, Selton Mello and Marjorie Estiano. It sets the story in the 1920s and includes many aspects not previous presented in other adaptions.
- Cruel Intentions (2016), a planned series for NBC part of the franchise of the same name, set as a sequel to the 1999 movie and also starring Sarah Michelle Gellar, of which only a pilot episode was made, also directed by Roger Kumble.
- Tempted (2018), a South Korean television series starring Woo Do-hwan, Joy, Moon Ga-young and Kim Min-jae. It sets the story in the 2010s and is said to be a loose remake.
- Dangerous Liaisons (2022), an American television series.
- Cruel Intentions (2024), an American streaming series on Amazon Prime Video part of the franchise of the same name.
- The Seduction (2025), a French television series focusing on Isabelle de Merteuil.
- The Scandal (2026), a South Korean television series on Netflix set in the Joseon era.

==== Radio ====
- An eight-part adaptation of the novel was broadcast as BBC Radio 4's "Woman's Hour Drama" (20–30 July 1992). It starred Juliet Stevenson, Samuel West, Melinda Walker, Diana Rigg, and Roger Allam.
- A two-part presentation of Christopher Hampton's play by BBC World Service in 1998. It starred Ciarán Hinds (Vicomte de Valmont), Lindsay Duncan (Marquise de Merteuil), and Emma Fielding (Mme. de Tourvel). It won the Grand Award for Best Entertainment Program at the New York Radio Festival.
- Les Liaisons Dangereuses: an Audible Original is a 2016 radio play starring the cast of that year's London Stage production.

== Sources ==
- Young, Wayland (1964). Eros Denied: Sex in Western Society. New York: Grove. ISBN 1-125-40416-7.
- Diaconoff, Suellen (1979). Eros and power in Les Liaisons dangereuses: a study in evil. Geneva: Droz.
