= Cruel Intentions (TV series) =

2024 American drama television series

- Release poster
- Genre: Drama
- Created by: Phoebe Fisher; Sara Goodman
- Based on: Cruel Intentions by Roger Kumble Les Liaisons dangereuses by Pierre Choderlos de Laclos
- Starring: Sarah Catherine Hook; Zac Burgess; Savannah Lee Smith; Sara Silva; John Harlan Kim; Khobe Clarke; Brooke Lena Johnson; Sean Patrick Thomas
- Music by: Jeff Cardoni
- Country of origin: United States
- Original language: English
- No. of seasons: 1
- No. of episodes: 8

Production
- Executive producers: Phoebe Fisher; Sara Goodman; Neal H. Moritz; Pavun Shetty; Roger Kumble; Andrea Iervolino; Monica Bacardi; Bruce Mellon
- Producers: Jess Burkle; Stefan Steen; Sheila Phillips
- Production locations: Toronto, Ontario
- Running time: 39–49 minutes
- Production companies: Off Center, Inc.; Original Film; AMBI Media Group; Amazon MGM Studios; Sony Pictures Television

Original release
- Network: Amazon Prime Video
- Release: November 21, 2024

Cruel Intentions is an American drama television series created by Phoebe Fisher and Sara Goodman, and produced by Original Film, Sony Pictures Television, and Amazon MGM Studios for Amazon Prime Video. It is served as a reboot and part of the franchise of the same name, it is based on the 1999 film by Roger Kumble, which in turn was a modern retelling of Pierre Choderlos de Laclos' 1782 novel Les Liaisons dangereuses.

The series, set in a Washington, D.C., college among rich students, follows two manipulative step siblings who are ready to do anything to maintain their status. It features a cast led by Sarah Catherine Hook, Zac Burgess, and Savannah Lee Smith.

Plans for a television adaptation of the film started in 1999 at Fox with a series that was later retooled as the 2000 direct-to-video prequel film Cruel Intentions 2 following its cancelation due to creative concerns. In 2015, NBC picked up a television pilot for a continuation of the film's storyline with Sarah Michelle Gellar returning but later passed on the project. Amazon announced a new project's development for Amazon Freevee in 2021, with Neal H. Moritz returning as an executive producer. It was given a series order in April 2023, and moved to Prime Video several months later. Filming took place in Toronto and began in June 2023.

Cruel Intentions premiered on Amazon Prime Video on November 21, 2024, to generally mixed reviews. In March 2025, the series was canceled after one season.

== Premise ==
Two step-siblings at Manchester College in Washington, D.C., have worked hard climbing the Greek life social ladder on campus. After a hazing incident goes wrong, however, the two will do anything it takes to maintain the status they have achieved and set their sights on seducing the Vice President's daughter.

== Cast and characters ==
=== Main ===
- Sarah Catherine Hook as Caroline Merteuil, Lucien's stepsister. The character is based on Kathryn Merteuil, which in turn, was based on the Marquise de Merteuil.
- Zac Burgess as Lucien Belmont, Caroline's stepbrother. The character is based on Sebastian Valmont, which in turn, was based on the Vicomte de Valmont.
- Savannah Lee Smith as Annie Grover, daughter of the Vice President. The character is based on Annette Hargrove, which in turn, was based on Madame de Tourvel.
- Sara Silva as Celeste "CeCe" Carroway. The character is based on Cecile Caldwell, which in turn, was based on Cécile Volanges.
- John Harlan Kim as Blaise Powell. The character is based on Blaine Tuttle. He is sleeping with Scott.
- Khobe Clarke as Scott Russell. The character is based on Greg McConnell. He is sleeping with Blaise.
- Brooke Lena Johnson as Beatrice Worth
- Sean Patrick Thomas as Professor Hank Chadwick. The character is based on Ronald Clifford (who Thomas also portrayed), which in turn, was based on the Chevalier Danceny.

=== Recurring ===
- Claire Forlani as Claudia Merteuil, Caroline's mother. The character is based on Tiffany Merteuil.
- Jon Tenney as U.S. Congressman Russell, Scott's father
- Nikki Crawford as 2nd Lady, Ellen Grover, Annie's mother. She is loosely based on Headmaster Hargrove.
- Isabella Tagliati as Ella
- Zeke Goodman as Brian Blandsman

=== Guest ===
- Vinessa Shaw as Dr. Deirdre Dawson, Hank's ex-wife

== Episodes ==
No.	Title	Directed by	Written by	Original release date
1	"Alpha"	Adam Arkin	Teleplay by : Phoebe Fisher; Story by : Phoebe Fisher & Sara Goodman	November 21, 2024
2	"Beta"	Nick Copus	Teleplay by : Phoebe Fisher; Story by : Phoebe Fisher & Sara Goodman	November 21, 2024
3	"Gamma"	Nick Copus	Nicholas Strain	November 21, 2024
4	"Delta"	Pippa Bianco	Chaconne Martin-Berkowicz	November 21, 2024
5	"Epsilon"	Pippa Bianco	Des Moran	November 21, 2024
6	"Zeta"	Nick Copus	Valerie Armstrong	November 21, 2024
7	"Eta"	Iain B. MacDonald	Jess Burkle	November 21, 2024
8	"Theta"	Iain B. MacDonald	Phoebe Fisher & Sara Goodman	November 21, 2024

== Production ==
=== Development ===
In 2015, NBC picked up a television pilot for a continuation of the 1999 film Cruel Intentions with Sarah Michelle Gellar returning but later passed on the project. Following that, Sony Pictures Television announced that the project will either be shopped to other networks or completely redeveloped. Amazon Studios announced that a new project was being developed in October 2021.

It received a series order, and filming was set to begin in April 2023. The series is developed by Phoebe Fisher and Sara Goodman who are set to executive produce alongside Neal H. Moritz. Upon the main cast announcement, Pavun Shetty, Andrea Iervolino, Monica Bacardi, and Bruce Mellon were added as executive producers. Original Film, Iervolino & Lady Bacardi Entertainment, Sony Pictures Television, and Amazon MGM Studios are producing the series. Eight episodes were ordered for Amazon Prime Video instead of Amazon Freevee. In March 2025, Amazon Prime Video canceled the series after one season.

=== Casting ===
In June 2023, Sarah Catherine Hook, Zac Burgess, Khobe Clarke, Brooke Lena Johnson, Sara Silva, John Harlan Kim, and Myra Molloy joined the starring cast with Sean Patrick Thomas as Professor Chadwick, having previously appeared in the original film as Ronald Clifford. The recurring cast includes Laura Benanti and Jon Tenney. Additional recurring members announced in December 2023 were Claire Forlani, Nikki Crawford, Isabella Tagliati, and Zeke Goodman.

=== Filming ===
The series began shooting in June 2023 in Toronto.

== Release ==
The series was released on November 21, 2024, on Amazon Prime Video.

== Reception ==
The review aggregator website Rotten Tomatoes reported a 24% approval rating based on 25 critic reviews, with an average rating of 4.7/10. The website's critics consensus reads, "Neither as fun or transgressive as the original Cruel Intentions, this television adaptation doesn't cut deep enough to make much of an impression." Metacritic, which uses a weighted average, assigned a score of 41 out of 100 based on nine critics, indicating "mixed or average" reviews.
