= Zac Burgess =

Australian actor

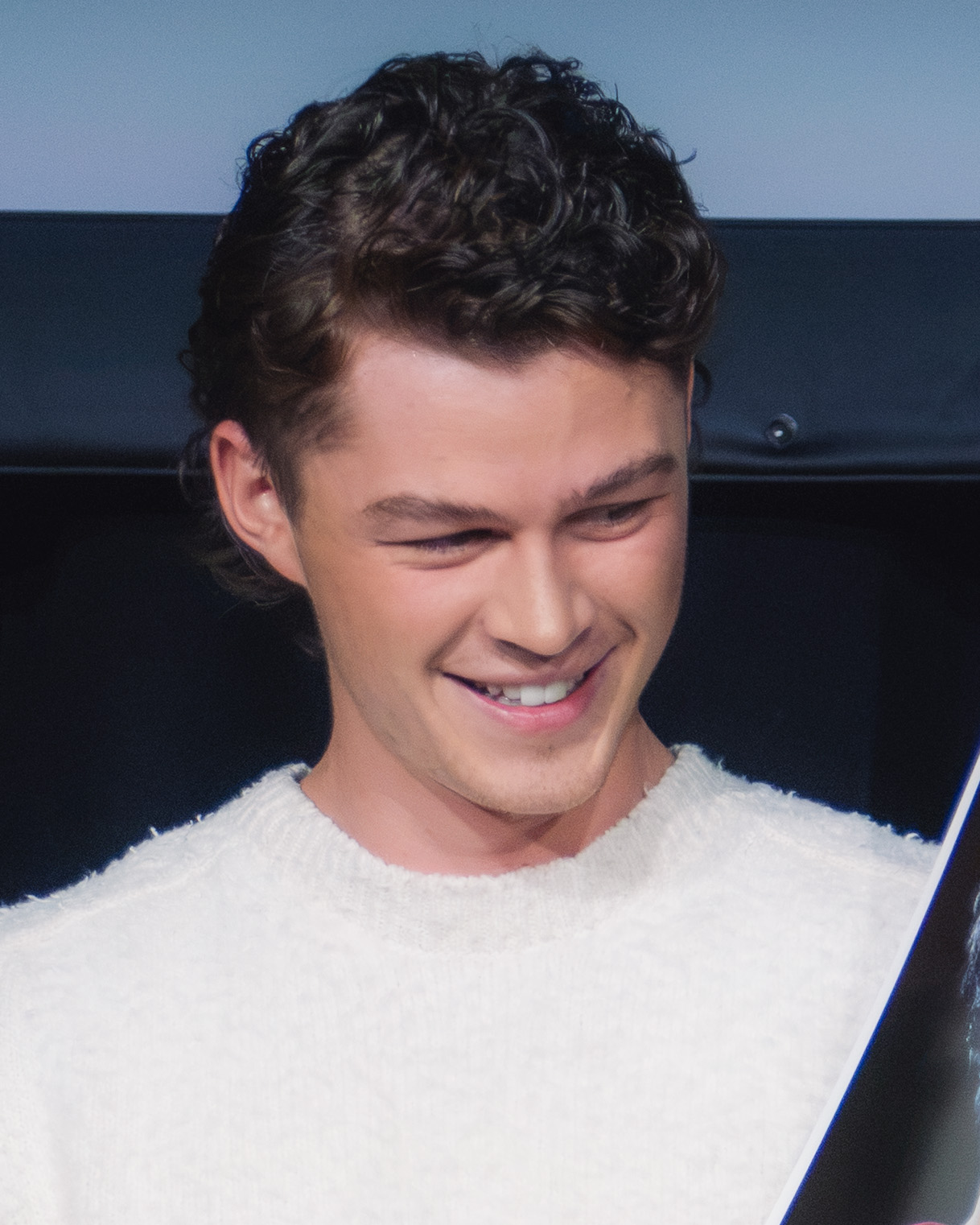
- Burgess in 2024
- Education: Western Australian Academy of Performing Arts
- Occupation: Actor
- Years active: 2018–present

Zac Burgess is an Australian actor. He began acting in 2018 in the short film Bring Me Back. He starred in the Australian television series One Night (2023), and in the limited Netflix series Boy Swallows Universe (2024). In 2024, he starred as Lucien Belmont in the Amazon Prime Video series Cruel Intentions, based on the 1999 film of the same name.

== Early life and education ==
Burgess is from Bellingen, New South Wales. His father was actor Scott Burgess. He has three siblings, Nadia, Ella and Lily. He studied and received his diploma in acting at the Western Australian Academy of Performing Arts in Perth, WA.

== Filmography ==
=== Short films ===
Year	Title	Role	Notes	Ref.
2018	Bring Me Back	Tom		
2018	Flightless Boy	Lucas		
2022	Call	Brandon		
2023	Nothing Gold Can Stay	Leo		

=== Television ===
Year	Title	Role	Notes	Ref.
2023	Totally Completely Fine	Teen John	1 episode	
2023	One Night	Jason	5 episodes	
2024	Boy Swallows Universe	Eli Bell	3 episodes	
2024	Cruel Intentions	Lucien Belmont	8 episodes	
