= Cruel Intentions 2 =

2000 film by Roger Kumble

- DVD cover
- Directed by: Roger Kumble
- Written by: Roger Kumble
- Produced by: Neal H. Moritz
- Starring: Robin Dunne; Sarah Thompson; Keri Lynn Pratt; Amy Adams
- Cinematography: James R. Bagdonas
- Edited by: Bill Johnson; J. Benjamin Chulay; James Flynn
- Music by: P.J. Hanke
- Production companies: Original Film; Newmarket Films
- Distributed by: Columbia TriStar Home Video
- Release dates: November 9, 2000 (Hungary); March 13, 2001 (United States)
- Running time: 87 minutes
- Country: United States
- Language: English

Cruel Intentions 2 (also known as Cruel Intentions 2: Manchester Prep) is a 2000 American direct-to-video teen drama film written and directed by Roger Kumble. It is a prequel to Cruel Intentions (1999), and the second installment in the Cruel Intentions franchise. It stars Robin Dunne, Sarah Thompson, Keri Lynn Pratt, and Amy Adams.

The film was originally planned as a television series called Manchester Prep, and was given a 13 episodes straight-to-series order by Fox in 1999. Following conflicts between Columbia TriStar Television and the network, it was canceled during filming with only two episodes already finished. The project was moved to the studio's home entertainment division, and the two episodes were edited together into a film, with additional scenes being filmed to change it to a prequel to the first film, to close the story and add scenes involving sexual content and nudity. Some subplots and supporting characters were also cut for the film version.

It was the first attempt to adapt the franchise as a television series, and was later followed by a television pilot for a continuation of the first film's storyline that was ultimately passed on by NBC, while a third project was given a series order at Amazon Prime Video and premiered in November 2024, but was canceled after one season.

Cruel Intentions 2 was released by Columbia TriStar Home Video in the United States on March 13, 2001, and received negative reviews from critics. It was followed by another direct-to-video film, Cruel Intentions 3, in 2004.

== Plot ==
Troublemaker student Sebastian Valmont is transferring to Manchester Prep following his father's recent remarriage to a wealthy divorcée. His current principal is adamant about having Sebastian's permanent record relayed to his new school, hampering his chance for a fresh start. Sebastian retaliates by pulling a cruel stunt on the principal's Rubenesque wife by publishing a nude photo of her in the yearbook.

Moving into his family's lavish New York City home, Sebastian meets his deceitful and ambitious stepsister. Kathryn Merteuil is immediately resentful when Sebastian proves to be both a more accomplished pianist and a sharper wit. Their initial confrontation culminates in Kathryn warning him not to interfere with her comfortable lifestyle.

While waiting to meet his new headmaster, Sebastian attempts to charm an attractive student, only to discover she is Danielle Sherman, the headmaster’s daughter. Sebastian has already manipulated his permanent record before its transfer, ensuring his fresh start.

Later, during a school assembly speech, Kathryn is repeatedly interrupted by a student with severe hiccups. When the student begins choking on a piece of gum, Danielle’s quick intervention with the Heimlich maneuver saves her. While the assembly celebrates Danielle's heroism, Kathryn is left ignored at the podium, eventually noticing the expelled gum stuck in her hair.

Kathryn presides over a secret student society dedicated to ostracizing peers they deem socially inferior. When Sebastian appears on the agenda, Kathryn dismisses him as a total loser, citing his unremarkable wardrobe as justification. However, upon discovering that Cherie comes from a family wealthier than her own, Kathryn decides to oversee her case personally, vowing to turn the innocent girl into the school's "premiere slut".

Sebastian and Danielle become friends and open up about their lives. Her mother passed away and his mother is in long-term drug rehab. His father is on his fourth marriage, having met Kathryn's mother while making a living with a charter boat in Miami. Sebastian develops a crush on Danielle and attempts to woo her with expensive gifts, but Cherie tells him that Danielle rejects materialism. Kathryn attempts to sabotage the blossoming relationship between Sebastian and Danielle by having identical twins join Sebastian for a steamy shower, casually revealing that Danielle is the only virgin at Manchester.

As Sebastian settles into his new affluence, he never forgets his humble upbringing and socializes extensively with the household staff during the parents' absence. A confrontation ensues when Kathryn is forced to endure her first-ever cab ride because the chauffeur was not answering her calls. Unloading her frustration on Sebastian, Kathryn briefly lets her guard down, revealing her own unhappiness with her privileged life. Later, his stepmother gives Sebastian a thinly veiled warning that both he and his father will end up on the street if his father fails to remain faithful. This threat becomes real when Sebastian catches his father cheating with another woman on his yacht, an affair Kathryn subsequently uses to blackmail her stepfather into saving the marriage.

Kathryn's plan to sabotage Cherie is disrupted when her mother orders her to befriend the girl instead, aiming to secure a large financial donation to the school from Cherie's family. In the end, Sebastian stays with Danielle and professes his love for her, only to discover she does not reciprocate and has been working with Kathryn in a secret plan to dupe him. Defeated, Sebastian states, "If you can't beat them, join them," leading to a threesome with Danielle and Kathryn, followed by an alliance of the three to dominate and manipulate others.

In his limousine, Sebastian opens a journal gifted to him by Danielle. Along the way, the limousine trails Cherie, who is zigzagging on her bicycle while wearing headphones. Spotting the vehicle at the last moment, she makes a panicked turn and crashes to the ground, leaving her separated bicycle to be run over and destroyed by the car. After the chauffeur offers the stranded girl a ride, Sebastian takes photos of a posing Cherie before the two engage in a sexual encounter in the back of the limousine. From the front seat, Kathryn and Danielle exchange mischievous smiles.

== Cast ==
- Robin Dunne as Sebastian Valmont
- Sarah Thompson as Danielle Sherman
- Keri Lynn Pratt as Cherie Claymon
- Amy Adams as Kathryn Merteuil
- Barry Flatman as Headmaster Sherman
- Ian D. Clark as Principal Ed Freeman
- Mimi Rogers as Tiffany Merteuil
- Teresa Hill as Lilly
- Barclay Hope as Mr. Felder
- Tane McClure as Bunny Claymon
- David McIlwraith as Edward Valmont
- Jonathan Potts as Assistant Headmaster Steve Muller
- Caley Wilson as Blaine Tuttle
- Deanna Wright as Penny Cartwright
- Clement von Franckenstein as Henry
- Shuko Akune as Min Lin
- Andrew Kraulis as Court Reynolds
- Jeannette Sousa as saleswoman
- Annie Sorell as Gretchen
- Alicia Sorell as Sarah
- William Lasselle as teacher
- Janaya Stephens as cab driver
- Kristin Booth as Lauren (uncredited)

== Production ==
Originally produced for the Fox network as a television series entitled Manchester Prep for the 1999–2000 television season, 13 episodes were ordered with original Cruel Intentions director Roger Kumble writing and executive producing the series. During production, there were conflicts between production company Columbia TriStar Television and the Fox network. Only the pilot and one further episode were filmed before the series was canceled due to network executives' uncertainty of the long term viability of the project. In addition to creative concerns, executives were also uncomfortable with the themes of teen sexuality and incest; Rupert Murdoch, head of Fox parent News Corporation, was said to be outraged after seeing a news story about Manchester Prep that previewed a scene in which one of the young female characters is sexually aroused by a horse.

After the cancellation, Columbia TriStar Home Video repackaged the two existing episodes of the show as a direct-to-video film. Additional scenes were filmed to close the story and add scenes involving sexual content and nudity. In 2022, deleted scenes from the series were uploaded on YouTube, confirming that it was originally set to be a reimagining of the first film, and was later changed to a prequel during the reshoots when the project became a film, resulting in Sarah Thompson's character, which was the same Reese Witherspoon was playing in the original film, being changed to a new character, and with Sean Patrick Thomas, who was playing Ronald Clifford in the 1999 film and was playing a new character in the series, being cut from the project for continuity reasons.

== Deleted materials ==
As the film was constructed from material originally shot for the Manchester Prep series, some subplots and supporting characters were removed in order to reduce the overall running time of the film. Some of these deleted storylines and characters were later leaked and uploaded on YouTube, including:

- In the deleted scenes, Sarah Thompson's character is named Annette, and is implied to be the same character Reese Witherspoon was playing in the first film, confirming that the series was set to be a reimagining of the film, and was changed to a prequel when the project became a film with her character changing name during the reshoots.
- Sarah Lancaster playing the character of Millicent Davis, a rival for Kathryn who aims to usurp her as the leader of the school community. Millicent tries to undermine Kathryn by running a strict anti-drugs campaign which forces Kathryn to help expel her friend Blaine from Manchester in order to save herself. Kathryn later gets her revenge by stealing Millicent's thunder through a TV interview and sabotaging her application to Yale. Excerpts from this are included in the film's trailer
- Sean Patrick Thomas playing the character of Todd Michaels, a replacement for Blaine who is keen to act as Kathryn's chief informant for the Manchester Tribunal. Thomas played the character of Ronald Clifford in the first film, although the character is implied to be a completely different one in the series. He was cut from the project when it became a prequel film for continuity reasons.
- Rel Hunt playing the character of Nigel Danby, a British overseas student who quickly becomes a rival of Sebastian for Danielle Sherman. Sebastian forms a temporary alliance with his stepsister Kathryn in order to bring Nigel down
- The opening of the new school library is shown, whilst Tiffany is thanked for her hard work, the library is ultimately named after Bunny Claymon due to her sizable donation. Kathryn is shown to be disgusted and wants to leave but Tiffany orders her to stay, vowing revenge for being overlooked after all her hard work.
- There are more clips of the secret Manchester Tribunal, including Kathryn lamenting Blaine's expulsion and her desire for more power within the school.

== Soundtrack ==
In the film credits, Edward Shearmur's music from Cruel Intentions and Stephen Endelman's music from Jawbreaker are listed as being used in the film.

Other songs used in the film include:

- Thin Lizard Dawn - Weed
- Thin Lizard Dawn - "Under the Wing"
- Jessica Theely - "In Good Time"
- The Julie Band - "Bad Day"
- Cupcakes - "Blood Thirsty"
- Treble Charger - "Left Feeling Odd"
- Gearwhore - "Passion"
- Jessica Sheely - "No Regrets"
- Bernie Barlow - "I Wanna Know Where Nowhere Is"
- Thin Lizard Dawn - "Turn Yourself In"
- Michael Greenspan - "I Want You"
- Lorna Vallings - "Taste"
- Shelly O'Neil - "Best Friend"
- Shelly Peiken - "Good to Me"
- Shelly O'Neil - "Make It Happen"
- The Julie Band - "Julie Goes Home Now"
- Jessica Sheely - "Feel Something"
- The Smithereens - "All Revved Up"
- The Smithereens - "The Last Good Time"

== Reception ==
Cruel Intentions 2 received generally negative reviews. On Rotten Tomatoes the film has an approval rating of 18% based on reviews from 11 critics.

== See also ==
- List of television series canceled before airing an episode
