= Sarah Catherine Hook =

American actress

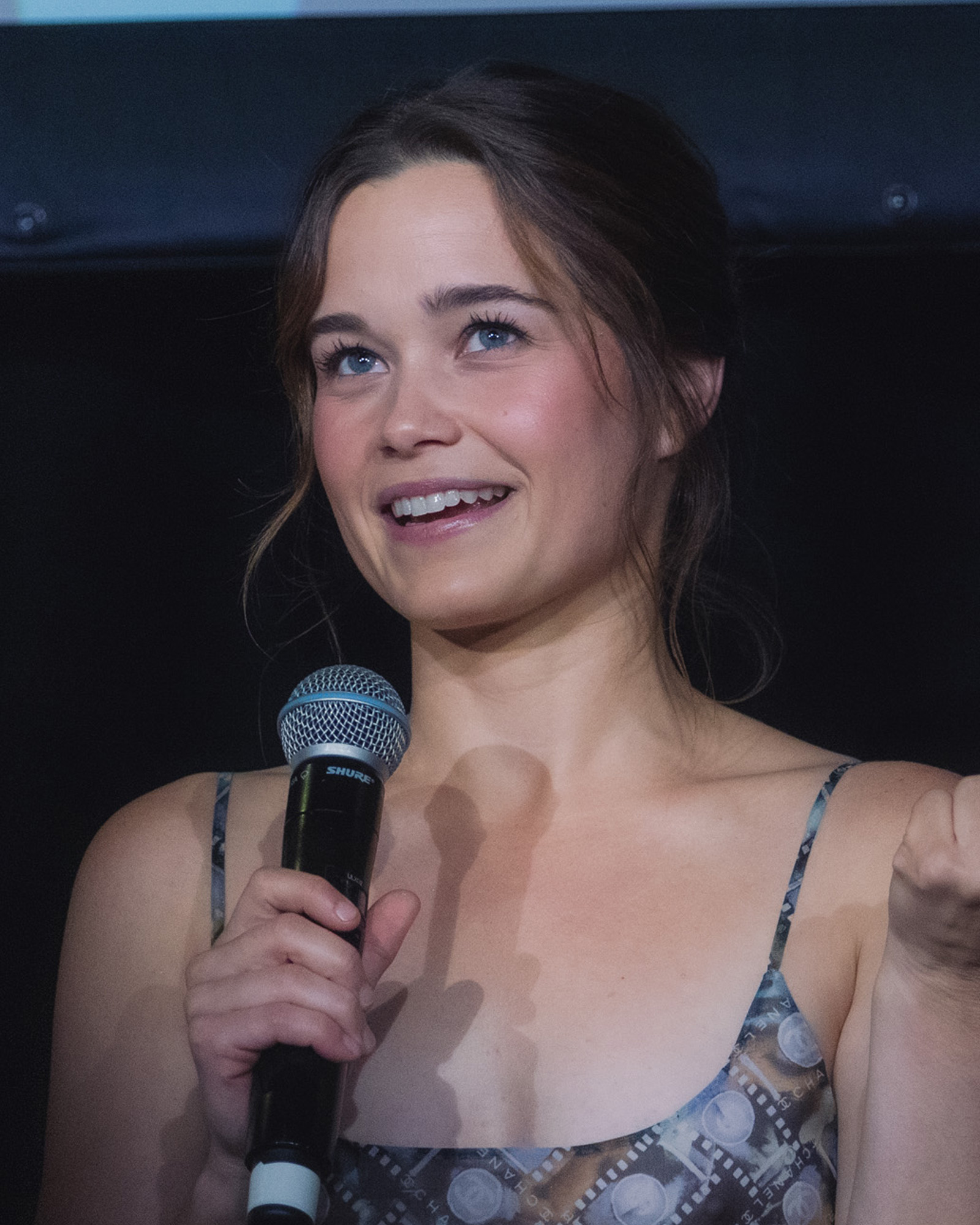
- Hook in 2024
- Born: Sarah Catherine Campbell Hook; Montgomery, Alabama, U.S.
- Education: State University of New York, Purchase (BM)
- Occupation: Actress
- Years active: 2016–present

Sarah Catherine Campbell Hook is an American actress and singer best known for starring in the film The Conjuring: The Devil Made Me Do It (2021). On television, she is known for her roles in the Netflix supernatural series First Kill (2022), the Prime Video drama Cruel Intentions (2024), and the third season of the HBO anthology series The White Lotus (2025).

== Early life ==
Sarah Catherine Hook was born in Montgomery, Alabama. She graduated from The Montgomery Academy. She also took a summer acting course with the Atlantic Theater Company.

== Career ==
Hook gained prominence through her role as Juliette Fairmont in the Netflix teen fantasy series First Kill, which premiered in June 2022. Her next project was The Ghost Trap, which was filmed in Maine and was based on the novel by K. Stephens. She played Happy, a potential love interest of the protagonist. In 2024, Hook starred in a leading role in the 2024 Amazon Prime Video remake series of Cruel Intentions (1999). She also played Piper Ratliff in the third season of The White Lotus, on HBO.

== Filmography ==
=== Film ===
Key
†	Denotes films that have not yet been released

Year	Title	Role	Notes
2018	I Believe	Girl	Short film
2018	Living In Harmony SodaStream	Girl	Video
2020	Harbor from the Holocaust	Narrator	Documentary
2021	The Conjuring: The Devil Made Me Do It	Debbie Glatzel	
2024	Where Shall We Start	Diana	Short film
2024	The Ghost Trap	Happy	
2026	People We Meet on Vacation	Sarah	
TBA	Capsized †	Nicole	Post-production
TBA	Jacket Chase Western †	Lex	Post-production; Short film

=== Television ===
Year	Title	Role	Notes
2017	Brunkala	Lana	1 episode
2019	Law & Order: Special Victims Unit	Meghan Gale	Episode: "We Dream of Machine Elves"
2020	NOS4A2	Rikki	Episode: "Bats"
2020	Monsterland	Elena Milak	Episode: "Iron River, Michigan"
2020	Triangle	Natalie Roman	1 episode
2021	Impeachment: American Crime Story	Catherine Allday Davis	2 episodes
2022	First Kill	Juliette Fairmont	Main role; 8 episodes
2024	Cruel Intentions	Caroline Merteuil	Main role; 8 episodes
2025	The White Lotus	Piper Ratliff	Main role; 8 episodes

=== Video games ===
Year	Title	Role	Notes
2027	Until Dawn 2	Izzy	
