= Cruel Intentions =

1999 film by Roger Kumble

- Theatrical release poster
- Directed by: Roger Kumble
- Screenplay by: Roger Kumble
- Based on: Les Liaisons dangereuses by Pierre Choderlos de Laclos
- Produced by: Neal H. Moritz
- Starring: Ryan Phillippe; Sarah Michelle Gellar; Reese Witherspoon; Selma Blair
- Cinematography: Theo van de Sande
- Edited by: Jeff Freeman
- Music by: Edward Shearmur
- Production companies: Columbia Pictures; Original Film; Newmarket Capital Group
- Distributed by: Sony Pictures Releasing
- Release date: March 5, 1999
- Running time: 97 minutes
- Country: United States
- Language: English
- Budget: $10.5 million
- Box office: $76.3 million

Cruel Intentions is a 1999 American teen romantic drama film written and directed by Roger Kumble, and starring Ryan Phillippe, Sarah Michelle Gellar, Reese Witherspoon, and Selma Blair. The film, set in New York City among rich high schoolers, is a modern retelling of Pierre Choderlos de Laclos' 1782 novel Les Liaisons dangereuses.

Initially a smaller-budget independent film, it was picked up by Columbia Pictures and widely released on March 5, 1999. Despite mixed critical reviews, the performances of Gellar, Phillippe, and Witherspoon were praised and the film grossed $76 million worldwide. Since its release, the film has become regarded as a cult classic.

Its box office success spawned a media franchise with a prequel in 2000 and a standalone sequel in 2004, as well as a jukebox musical in 2015 and a 2024 television series.

== Plot ==
Wealthy New York teenager Sebastian Valmont, an accomplished manipulator, seeks a new challenge in seducing a young woman seemingly impervious to his charms. He settles on Annette Hargrove—the daughter of his new school headmaster—who is staunchly opposed to sex before falling in love. Sebastian and his equally manipulative stepsister, the intelligent and popular Kathryn Merteuil, agree on a bet: if Sebastian fails to seduce Annette, then Kathryn gets his vintage Jaguar XK140; if he wins, Kathryn will finally have sex with him. Kathryn tries to recruit Sebastian into her own scheme to take revenge on her ex-boyfriend Court Reynolds, who left her because of her promiscuity and began dating the naive and innocent Cecile Caldwell.

Sebastian's initial efforts to seduce Annette fail as she has been informed of his reputation. He suspects Annette's friend Greg, a closeted homosexual, of being responsible and blackmails him into convincing Annette of his good nature. Later, Sebastian learns that Cecile's mother warned Annette and agrees to corrupt Cecile as revenge.

Kathryn notices romantic tension between Cecile and her music teacher Ronald Clifford, and reveals this to Cecile's mother, who fires him. Sebastian and Kathryn convince Ronald to fight for Cecile by writing her a love letter which Sebastian uses to lure Cecile to his bedroom, where he coerces her into receiving oral sex from him. The next day, Kathryn advises Cecile to have sex with Sebastian to learn to please Ronald.

Spending time with Annette, Sebastian develops genuine feelings for her, attracted to her honesty and ability to make his normally stoic self laugh. He kisses her but she resists because she reciprocates his feelings and fears she cannot restrain herself around him. Sebastian calls Annette a hypocrite for rejecting the opportunity for true love, so she finally relents and begins undressing. However Sebastian, confused about his own feelings, declines to have sex with her. Annette leaves the following day, but he finds her, professes his feelings, and they have sex.

A jealous Kathryn tries to seduce Sebastian but is frustrated that her hold over him has been broken by his feelings for Annette, and she convinces him that he cannot change his true nature. Sebastian plans to tell Annette the truth about the bet but Kathryn warns him that he will only destroy both his and Annette's reputations. He devastates Annette by lying that he only wanted her for sex and feels nothing for her. Sebastian tells Kathryn that he has broken up with Annette and, having won the bet, wants his reward, but she dismisses him. Kathryn reveals that he was the true target of her scheme and that she manipulated him into feeling shame over his love for Annette for her own amusement.

Sebastian tries to contact Annette to confess the truth and beg for a second chance, but she refuses to see him. He gives her his journal, in which he has detailed Kathryn's manipulative schemes, their bet, and his true feelings for Annette. Seeking revenge, Kathryn calls Ronald, claiming that Sebastian hurt her and slept with Cecile.

Ronald then confronts Sebastian, and the ensuing fight migrates to the middle of the street. Annette tries to intervene but is thrown into traffic and Sebastian is hit by a taxi while pushing her to safety. Sebastian and Annette confess their love for each other before he dies from his injuries.

At Sebastian's funeral, Kathryn, unmoved by his death, begins to deliver a eulogy, but people start to leave. Kathryn rushes outside to find Cecile handing out copies of Sebastian's journal, titled Cruel Intentions. As the details of her manipulations, promiscuity, and drug abuse are made public, Kathryn weeps as her reputation and good-girl persona are destroyed. Annette drives down a highway in Sebastian's car while wearing his sunglasses and with his journal at her side, recalling their fondest moments together.

== Cast ==
- Sarah Michelle Gellar as Kathryn Merteuil, based on the Marquise de Merteuil
- Ryan Phillippe as Sebastian Valmont, based on the Vicomte de Valmont
- Reese Witherspoon as Annette Hargrove, based on Madame de Tourvel
- Selma Blair as Cecile Caldwell, based on Cécile de Volanges
- Louise Fletcher as Helen Rosemond, based on Madame de Rosemonde
- Joshua Jackson as Blaine Tuttle, based on Azolan
- Eric Mabius as Greg McConnell, based on Julie
- Sean Patrick Thomas as Ronald Clifford, based on the Chevalier Danceny
- Swoosie Kurtz as Dr. Regina Greenbaum (Kurtz portrayed Madame de Volanges in the 1988 film version of Dangerous Liaisons)
- Christine Baranski as Bunny Caldwell, based on Madame de Volanges
- Alaina Reed Hall as Nurse
- Hiep Thi Le as Mai-Lee
- Deborah Offner as Mrs. Michalak
- Tara Reid as Marci Greenbaum
- Drew Snyder as Headmaster Hargrove
- Herta Ware as Mrs. Sugarman
- Charlie O'Connell as Court Reynolds, based on the Comte de Gercourt
- Fred Norris as Meter Maid

== Production ==
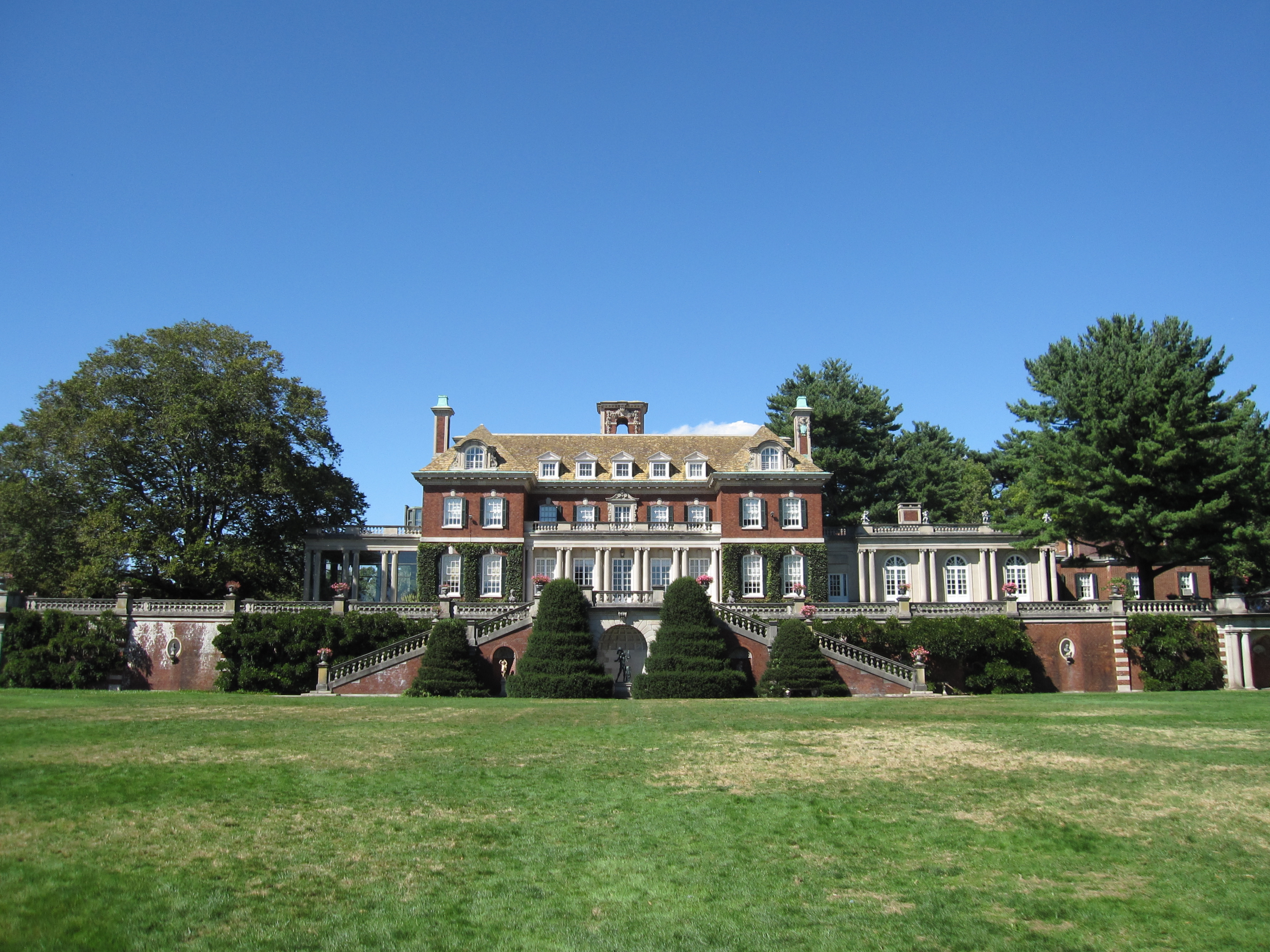
Old Westbury Gardens was one of the filming locations.

One of the filming locations was Old Westbury Gardens in Nassau County, New York, as well as the Harry F. Sinclair House in New York City. In a 2016 interview, Sarah Michelle Gellar revealed that the original title of the movie was "Cruel Inventions".

Of the roughly $10 million budget for the film, close to one million dollars—or about 10%—was spent to secure the license for "Bitter Sweet Symphony" by The Verve, which was used in the film's final scene. This high cost was partly due to a lawsuit filed by the Rolling Stones' then-manager Allen Klein, who alleged that the band had used a larger portion of an orchestral cover of the Stones’ “The Last Time” (by the Andrew Oldham Orchestra) than had been licensed. At the time, the lawsuit resulted in the Verve relinquishing all royalties to Klein and the songwriting credits changing to Jagger–Richards. Producer Neal Moritz later commented “When we thought it was going to be hopeless to get, we tried 200 other songs in its place. We could not find anything even close to it. It was well worth it.”

== Reception ==
On Rotten Tomatoes, Cruel Intentions has an approval score of 55% based on 120 reviews, with an average rating of 5.7/10. The site's critics consensus states: "This darkly comic drama and its attractive young cast are easy on the eyes, but uneven performances and an uninspired script conspire to foil Cruel Intentions." Metacritic gave the film a weighted average score of 56 out of 100 based on 24 critics, indicating "mixed or average" reviews. Audiences polled by CinemaScore gave the film an average grade of "B-" on an A+ to F scale.

Charles Taylor of Salon.com described the film as "the dirtiest-minded American movie in recent memory – and an honestly corrupt entertaining picture is never anything to sneeze at". Stephen Holden of The New York Times wrote: "You have the queasy sense that the whole thing is just an elaborate stunt and, in this case, an exploitative one." Roger Ebert of The Chicago Sun-Times praised Cruel Intentions and gave the film three out of four stars in his review, stating that it was "smart and merciless in the tradition of the original story".

=== Box office ===
Cruel Intentions was a commercial success, grossing $13,020,565 in its opening weekend, ranking No. 2 behind Analyze This; released in 2,312 theaters, the movie raked in $76.3 worldwide against a $10.5 million budget.

=== Awards and nominations ===
Award	Category	Nominee(s)	Result
Blockbuster Entertainment Awards	Favorite Supporting Actress – Drama/Romance	Reese Witherspoon	Won
Csapnivalo Awards	Best Movie		Nominated
Csapnivalo Awards	Best Teen Movie		Nominated
Csapnivalo Awards	Best Movie Soundtrack		Nominated
Csapnivalo Awards	Best Actress in a Leading Role	Sarah Michelle Gellar	Nominated
Csapnivalo Awards	Best Original Score	Edward Shearmur	Won
Golden Trailer Awards	Trashiest Trailer		Won
MTV Movie Awards	Best Male Performance	Ryan Phillippe	Nominated
MTV Movie Awards	Best Female Performance	Sarah Michelle Gellar	Won
MTV Movie Awards	Best Breakthrough Female Performance	Selma Blair	Nominated
MTV Movie Awards	Best Villain	Sarah Michelle Gellar	Nominated
MTV Movie Awards	Best Kiss	Sarah Michelle Gellar and Selma Blair	Won
Stinkers Bad Movie Awards	Worst Remake		Nominated
Teen Choice Awards	Choice Drama Movie		Won
Teen Choice Awards	Choice Movie Actor	Ryan Phillippe	Nominated
Teen Choice Awards	Choice Movie Actress	Reese Witherspoon	Nominated
Teen Choice Awards	Choice Movie Sleazebag	Sarah Michelle Gellar	Won
Teen Choice Awards	Choice Movie Sleazebag	Ryan Phillippe	Nominated
Teen Choice Awards	Choice Movie Hissy Fit	Ryan Phillippe	Nominated
Teen Choice Awards	Choice Sexiest Love Scene	Ryan Phillippe and Reese Witherspoon	Nominated
Teen Choice Awards	Choice Movie Soundtrack	Cruel Intentions	Nominated
Vega Digital Awards	Social Campaigns		Won

== Impact and legacy ==
After its release, Cruel Intentions became a cult classic that redefined the teen movie genre by its storyline and characters. Its exploration of different themes such as manipulation, sexual power and social status presented a darker side of the usual adolescence depicted in teen movies. Writing for The Ringer, Andrew Gruttadaro described it as "a shocking spin of the teen movie that maintained the genre's penchant for fantasy and wish fulfillment while stripping away all of its naivete and saccharinity". It inspired other movies that were influenced by its plot and characters, such as Do Revenge.

Kathryn's character became an example of a powerful and calculating female antagonist, who rails "against the confines of womanhood and gender double standards" and "operates with the confidence of someone who knows she’ll never be held accountable". Sean Migalla from Ranker added that "it's hard to find a more manipulative teen character than Kathryn". Her character has been compared to other actresses portraying the mean girl persona. Since then, she has often been ranked amongst the best and most evil characters of teen movies.

One of the film's most notable moments is Ryan Phillippe's nude pool scene where his character Sebastian is shown from behind completely naked. The scene became a pop culture moment that has been discussed over the years, particularly amongst gay men who described it as a sexual awakening. Joseph Longo from Melmagazine.com declared that although Phillippe's butt appeared "only two seconds, [...] it’s lived on in the minds of countless gay men". In an interview with Entertainment Weekly, Phillippe himself acknowledged the phenomenon saying, "So many guys on Twitter are like, ‘That’s the moment I knew I was gay’".

== Soundtrack ==
The Cruel Intentions soundtrack is a compilation soundtrack released on March 9, 1999, by Arista/Virgin Records. It reached number 60 on the Billboard chart. The lead track for the film was "Bitter Sweet Symphony" by rock band The Verve.

== Franchise ==
=== Prequel ===
A prequel film, Cruel Intentions 2, was released direct-to-video in 2001, written and directed by Roger Kumble, assembled from three episodes filmed for Manchester Prep, a series based on the film scrapped by Fox. It features younger versions of Sebastian Valmont and Kathryn Merteuil played by Robin Dunne and Amy Adams, respectively.

=== Sequel ===
It was followed by a standalone sequel, Cruel Intentions 3, in 2004, directed by Scott Ziehl, starring Kerr Smith and Kristina Anapau, as Cassidy Merteuil, cousin to Kathryn. None of the cast from the original appeared in the direct-to-video films.

=== Canceled 2016 sequel series ===
NBC picked up a television pilot for a continuation of the film's storyline in October 2015. The pilot was set seventeen years after the events of the film and sees Bash Casey, son of Sebastian Valmont and Annette Hargrove, discover his late father's journal. Upon discovering this he is thrown into a world of lies, sex, and power. The potential series was to have Kathryn Merteuil, Bash's step-aunt, attempt to gain power of Valmont International.

In February 2016, Taylor John Smith and Samantha Logan were cast, with Smith playing the male lead role of Bash Casey, Sebastian Valmont and Annette Hargrove's son. Gellar reached a deal with producers to reprise her role as the female lead, Kathryn Merteuil. In March, Kate Levering was cast to replace Witherspoon for the role of Annette Hargrove.

Several months later, on October 31, NBC passed on the project and the series did not go forward.

=== Television series ===
In October 2021, a television series reboot of Cruel Intentions was in development for IMDb TV (now Amazon Freevee). In April 2023, the reboot was given a series order. It premiered on Amazon Prime Video on November 21, 2024, but was canceled after one season.

=== Musical ===
A 1990s jukebox musical by Kumble, Rosin, and Ross, was first staged in 2015. After two runs in Los Angeles and a pop-up engagement in New York, Cruel Intentions: The '90s Musical made its Off-Broadway debut at the Greenwich Village nightclub Le Poisson Rouge in November 2017 and ran through April 2018. Set to pop and rock hits of the 1990s and songs from the film's soundtrack, the plot follows the manipulations of Sebastian Valmont and Kathryn Merteuil, out to destroy anyone who gets in their way.

== See also ==
- Blonde versus brunette rivalry
