= John Harlan Kim =

Australian actor (born 1993)

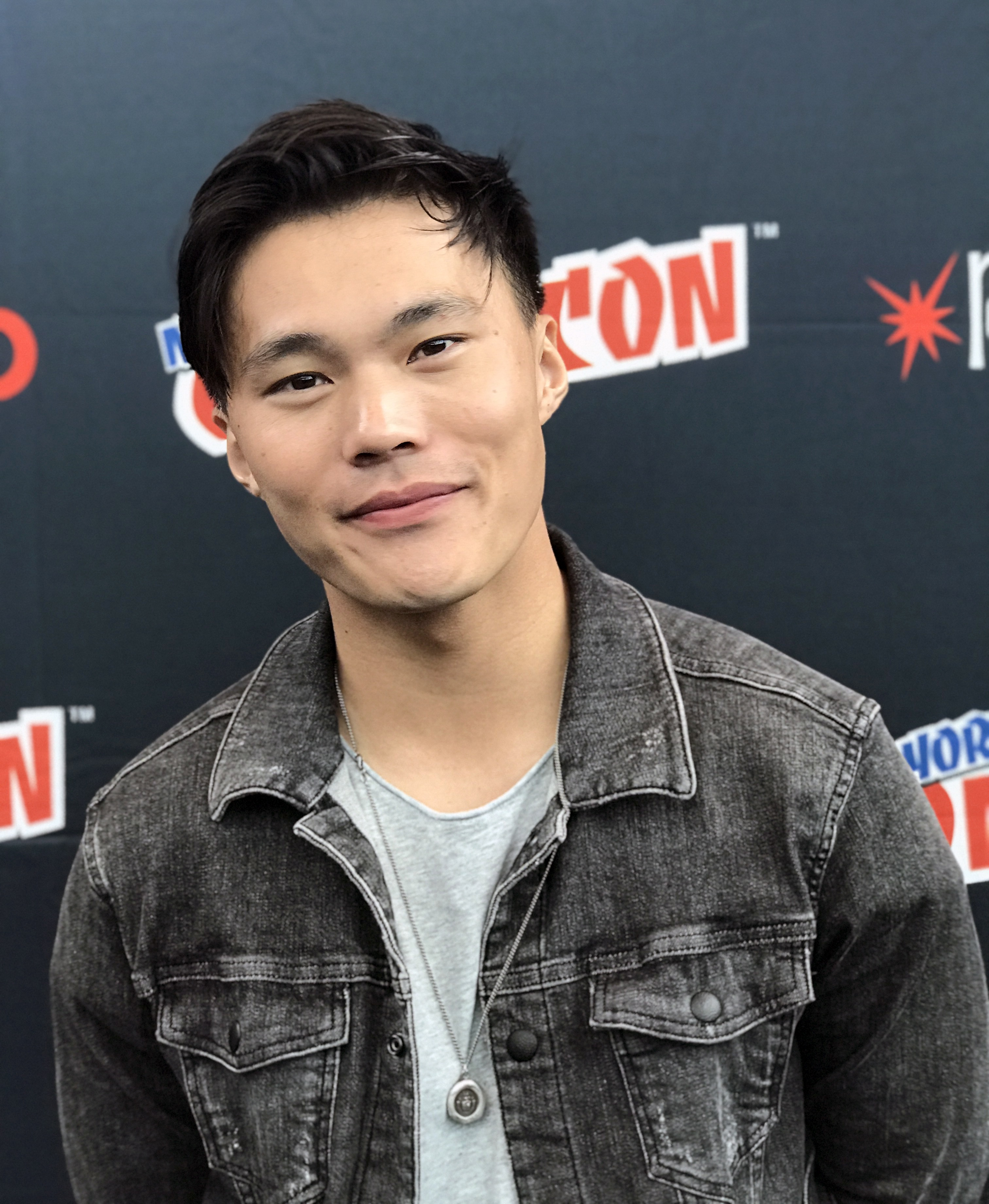
- Kim at the 2017 New York Comic Con
- Born: 10 January 1993 (age 33); Melbourne, Victoria, Australia
- Occupation: Actor
- Years active: 2009–present

John Harlan Kim (born 10 January 1993) is an Australian actor of Korean descent. He is known for playing Ezekiel Jones on the 2014–2018 American adventure television series The Librarians.

== Career ==
Kim's first audition was for the Tom Hanks–Steven Spielberg TV miniseries The Pacific, where he was given the role of a 14-year-old Japanese soldier in the episode "Okinawa". Kim then spent two years finishing high school and playing the part of Dale "Macca" McGregor, a recurring character in the Australian soap opera Neighbours.

In 2014, Kim was cast in a starring role on the TNT adventure television series The Librarians as Ezekiel Jones, a thief and "master of technologies and fan of classic crimes, who enjoys playing the role of an international man of mystery", a role he played for four seasons. In 2019, he was cast as Greg Li, "a brilliant medical student", in The CW science-fiction television series Pandora.

== Filmography ==
Year	Title	Role	Notes
2009–2011	Neighbours	Dale 'Macca' McGregor	Recurring role, 13 episodes; as John Kim
2010	The Pacific	14-year-old Japanese Soldier	Episode: "Okinawa"; uncredited
2014–2018	The Librarians	Ezekiel Jones	Main role; 42 episodes
2019	NCIS: Los Angeles	Fang Kong Li	Episode: "Till Death Do Us Part"
2019	Pandora	Greg Li	Main role (episodes 1–3)
2020	Hawaii Five-0	Endo	Recurring role; 2 episodes
2020–2023	9-1-1	Albert Han	Recurring (seasons 3, 5–6); Main role (season 4)
2021	The Little Things	Officer Henderson	
2021	Nancy Drew	Agent Park	Season 3
2022	Purple Hearts	Toby	Supporting role
2023	The Last Thing He Told Me	Bobby	Recurring role; 5 episodes
2023	Air	Simon	Short film
2024	White Fever	Kev	2 episodes
2024	Cruel Intentions	Blaise Powell	Main role; 8 episodes
2025	WondLa	Hailey (voice)	7 episodes
2027	Voltron		Post-production
TBA	Perfect Girl		Post-production
