= Savannah Lee Smith =

American actress

- Born: July 27, 2000 (age 26)
- Education: New York University
- Occupation: Actress
- Years active: 2018–present

Savannah Lee Smith (born July 27, 2000) is an American actress. She gained recognition due to her performance in the HBO Max series, Gossip Girl.

== Early life ==
Smith was born on July 27, 2000, and grew up in Los Angeles. Her father is a screenwriter, while her mother was a professional singer in the 90s. She attended a private Catholic all-girls school in Los Angeles.

In high school, Smith was a singer as part of the school choir. After having doubts, Smith switched to musical theater, and grew to enjoy acting after receiving her first speaking role. She continued to pursue acting in high school.

Smith enrolled in New York University’s Tisch School of the Arts in 2018. She majored in music, but transferred to drama in her first year to pursue acting in theater. During her time in the theater program, she wrote a full-length play in three months.

== Career ==
Smith, who lives in New York City, auditioned for multiple roles for Gossip Girl before being cast as Monet de Haan. In November 2021, she was cast as the lead in musical film Something Here.

Smith announced her new role as Clara in an undisclosed film in October 2022. The following month, Smith begins filming a Lifetime movie, Drunk, Drive, and 17, in a lead role as Kim. The film was aired on April 15, 2023.

Smith joined the cast of the Upside of Unrequited adaption by Shakespeare Sisters in July 2024. She's also set to star in an upcoming film titled Tinsel Town.

== Personal life ==
Smith is bisexual.

At the age of 16, Smith discovered that she had severe scoliosis, and had spinal fusion surgery shortly after being advised by a doctor to do so immediately.

== Filmography ==
=== Film ===
Year	Title	Role	Notes	Ref
2023	Murder at the Murder Mystery Party	Clara Edwards	Lead role	
2025	Tinsel Town	Izzy		
TBA	Something Here	Samantha "Sam" Abrams	Main role	
TBA	The Upside of Unrequited			

=== Television ===
Year	Title	Role	Notes	Ref.
2021–2023	Gossip Girl	Monet De Haan	Main role	
2023	Drunk, Driving, and 17	Kim Summers	Television film	
2024	Cruel Intentions	Annie Grover	Main role	
2026	Line of Fire	Sydney, the First Daughter		
