= Cruel Intentions 3 =

2004 film by Scott Ziehl

- DVD cover
- Directed by: Scott Ziehl
- Written by: Rhett Reese
- Produced by: Neal H. Moritz
- Starring: Kerr Smith; Kristina Anapau; Nathan Wetherington; Melissa Yvonne Lewis; Natalie Ramsey; Tom Parker
- Cinematography: Thomas L. Calloway
- Edited by: Alan Cody
- Music by: David Reynolds
- Production companies: Columbia TriStar Home Entertainment; Original Film; Newmarket Capital Group
- Distributed by: Columbia TriStar Home Entertainment
- Release date: May 25, 2004
- Running time: 85 minutes
- Country: United States
- Language: English

Cruel Intentions 3 is a 2004 American direct-to-video teen drama film directed by Scott Ziehl. It is a standalone sequel to Cruel Intentions (1999), and the third installment in the Cruel Intentions franchise. It stars Kristina Anapau as Cassidy Merteuil, the cousin of Kathryn Merteuil from the previous installments, alongside Kerr Smith, Nathan Wetherington, Melissa Yvonne Lewis, and Natalie Ramsey.

Bored, wealthy college prep school students make wagers on seducing naive young girls, later meeting their match when they bet on who can seduce the most popular and devious girl who also has her own agenda.

Cruel Intentions 3 was released by Columbia TriStar Home Entertainment on May 25, 2004.

== Plot ==
Cassidy Merteuil is a beautiful, manipulative student at an exclusive Santa Barbara college. Jason Argyle and Patrick Bates are roommates there. They pull off a devious plan where Patrick beds Cassidy and disrupts a potential relationship she had been pursuing with a British prince. This then helps Jason win a bet he made with Cassidy (which turns out to have been Patrick's bet all along).

When Patrick (who also reveals his awkwardness and social ineptitude to be an act) and Jason reveal their deception to Cassidy, she is devastated. She later encourages them to compete against each other. Jason has to seduce Sheila, who is in a steady relationship with Michael, and Patrick has to seduce Alison, who is already engaged.

Jason succeeds in his part, but Patrick is rejected by Alison, who insists she does not want to cheat and does not find him sexually attractive. When classmate Brent Patterson shows an interest in her after being rejected by Cassidy, she succumbs to temptation and sleeps with him, not knowing Patrick is taking photos. Patrick blackmails Alison, using the photos of her cheating on her fiancé. He tells her how he succeeded before, then throws her on her bed and rapes her in order to fulfill his part of the bet with Jason.

Meanwhile, Jason and Cassidy strike up a relationship. As Patrick is left unsatisfied and angry by the rape, he attempts to seduce Cassidy, but she rejects him. So, he convinces her that the man she loves, Jason, is only staying with her because he wants to win the bet he and Patrick had made, which was to see who could sleep with Cassidy first.

Seemingly angry with Jason, she gives in to Patrick, and Jason walks in on them. Patrick snidely remarks that both Jason and Cassidy have been victims of his cruel game to show them that they underestimated the evil in themselves. They ask him if he has ever been a victim, and he tells them no. Cassidy reveals that this had been her plan all along. She began the little charade so Patrick and Jason would seduce Alison and Sheila; before sleeping with Patrick, she took one of his sleeping pills, planning to tell the police that he had drugged and raped her.

As Patrick is led away by the police, bewildered and protesting his innocence, he is warned that another victim has come forward, and he will get the punishment he deserves for raping Alison. In the end, Jason and Cassidy are shown together, making another bet with each other, this time over the British prince from the opening of the film.

== Cast ==
- Kerr Smith as Jason Argyle
- Kristina Anapau as Cassidy Merteuil
- Nathan J. Wetherington as Patrick Bates
- Melissa Yvonne Lewis as Alison Lebray
- Natalie Ramsey as Sheila Wright
- Tom Parker as Michael Cattrall
- Michael Pemberton as Christopher Newborn
- Tara Carroll as Valeria Caldas
- Charlie Weber as Brent Patterson
- Alex Donnelley as Professor Eldridge

== Reception ==
On the review aggregator website Rotten Tomatoes, 50% of two critics' reviews are positive. Common Sense Media rated the film 1 out of 5 stars.
