= Samantha Logan =

American actress (born 1996)

- Born: Samantha Jade Logan; October 27, 1996 (age 30); Boston, Massachusetts, U.S.
- Occupation: Actress
- Years active: 2009–present

Samantha Jade Logan (born October 27, 1996) is an American actress. She is best known for her roles as the lead role as Olivia Baker in The CW series All American, Nina Jones in the second season of the Netflix series 13 Reasons Why, Nona Clark in 666 Park Avenue, Tia Stephens in the Freeform series The Fosters, and Taylor DuBois in General Hospital.

== Life and career ==
Logan was born in Boston, Massachusetts, of Irish and Trinidadian descent. She attended the Professional Performing Arts School and Fiorello H. LaGuardia High School. After appearing in an episode of Law & Order: Special Victims Unit, she was cast in a series regular role opposite Vanessa Williams in the ABC drama series 666 Park Avenue playing the role of Nona Clark. The series was canceled after one season in 2013. Logan later was cast in the ABC daytime soap opera General Hospital as Taylor DuBois.

In 2014, Logan appeared in the comedy film Alexander and the Terrible, Horrible, No Good, Very Bad Day and had a recurring roles on ABC Family sitcom Melissa & Joey, and MTV teen drama Teen Wolf. From 2014 to 2015, she had a recurring role as Tia Stephens in the ABC Family drama The Fosters. In 2015, Logan was regular cast member in the unaired ABC prime time soap opera Members Only and in 2016 guest starred on the 300th episode of NCIS. Also in 2016, Logan starred in the NBC soap opera pilot Cruel Intentions.

In 2018, Logan had a recurring role in the Netflix teen drama series 13 Reasons Why and later began starring in The CW sports drama series All American.

== Filmography ==
=== Film ===
| Year | Title | Role | Notes |
|---|---|---|---|
| 2011 | Detachment | Spitting Daughter | |
| 2014 | Alexander and the Terrible, Horrible, No Good, Very Bad Day | Heather | |
| 2019 | Polaroid | Kasey | |
| 2019 | LOVE | Sophia | Short |
| 2020 | The Empty Man | Davara Walsh | |

=== Television ===
| Year | Title | Role | Notes |
|---|---|---|---|
| 2009 | Gossip Girl | Little Girl #2 | Episode: "Enough About Eve" |
| 2011 | Law & Order: Special Victims Unit | Lola | Episode: "Blood Brothers" |
| 2012–13 | 666 Park Avenue | Nona Clark | Main Cast |
| 2013 | General Hospital | Taylor DuBois | Regular Cast |
| 2014 | Melissa & Joey | Stella | Recurring Cast: Season 3 |
| 2014 | Teen Wolf | Violet | Recurring Cast: Season 4 |
| 2014–15 | The Fosters | Tia Stephens | Recurring Cast: Season 2 |
| 2016 | Comedy Bang! Bang! | Jade | Episode: "Blue Flannel Shirt" |
| 2016 | NCIS | Riley Davis | Episode: "Scope" |
| 2016 | Junior | Nessa | Main Cast |
| 2016 | Cruel Intentions | Cassidy Barrett | Unaired pilot |
| 2018 | 13 Reasons Why | Nina Jones | Recurring Cast: Season 2 |
| 2018–26 | All American | Olivia Baker | Main Cast: Season 1–6; Special Guest: Seasons 7–8 |

=== Music Videos ===
| Year | Title | Performer | Ref. |
|---|---|---|---|
| 2016 | "Atlantis" | Bridgit Mendler | |
| 2021 | "Heartbreak Anniversary" | Giveon | |
