= Cruel Intentions: The '90s Musical =

2015 American jukebox musical

- Promotional poster of the Off-Broadway production
- Music: Various artists
- Lyrics: Various artists
- Book: Roger Kumble; Lindsey Rosin; Jordan Ross Schindler
- Basis: Cruel Intentions by Roger Kumble; Les Liaisons dangereuses by Pierre Choderlos de Laclos
- Productions: 2015 Los Feliz; 2016 Hollywood; 2017 New York Pop-Up; 2017 Off-Broadway; 2019 US Tour; 2019 Edinburgh Fringe Festival; 2021 LA Concert; 2022-2023 Australia; 2024 Off West End; 2025 UK Tour; 2025 Argentina

Cruel Intentions: The '90s Musical, known during its Californian performances as Cruel Intentions: The Completely Unauthorized Musical Parody, and during its off-Broadway run as Cruel Intentions: The Musical, is a 2015 American jukebox musical based on the 1999 film Cruel Intentions, with a score made up of hit songs from the 1990s. The musical's book is by Roger Kumble, Lindsey Rosin and Jordan Ross Schindler; Kumble was the writer and director of the original film. The film Cruel Intentions is itself a modern-day telling of the 1782 French novel Les Liaisons dangereuses by Pierre Choderlos de Laclos.

After successful performances in Los Angeles and New York, the show made its Off-Broadway debut at Greenwich Village nightclub Le Poisson Rouge in November 2017. The show was the first theater production ever staged there, which offered bar and table service. Originally scheduled for a ten-week engagement, the show was extended three times, through April 2018.

The show had its UK debut in August 2019 at the Palais du Variété Spiegeltent at Assembly George Square Gardens, part of the Edinburgh Fringe festival, starring Dominic Andersen as Sebastian and Rebecca Gilhooley as Kathryn Merteuil, produced by Bill Kenwright. The show opened at The Other Palace in London in January 2024, where it was scheduled to run until May, starring Daniel Bravo as Sebastian and Rhianne-Louise McCaulsky as Kathryn. As with the 2017 Off-Broadway run, Sarah Michelle Gellar reprises her role as the original Kathryn to ask patrons to turn off their phones before the show starts.

== Synopsis ==
Sebastian Valmont and Kathryn Merteuil are introduced as step-siblings, living in New York City's Upper East Side and attending Manchester Prep, a prestigious co-educational private school ("Every You Every Me"). Recently single, after being dumped by Court Reynolds, Kathryn seeks to exact revenge by involving her step-brother, and asking him to seduce Court's new girlfriend, the innocent debutante, Cecile Caldwell ("I'm The Only One"). She has already been asked by Mrs. Bunny Caldwell, Cecile's mother, to look after her and guide her through her time at Manchester Prep, telling her she turns to God in times of trouble, wearing a crucifix containing cocaine. Sebastian, a master seducer who logs his conquests in a journal, sees this as too easy and increases the challenge by challenging himself to deflower their incoming headmaster's daughter, Annette Hargrove. Should he be successful, he will get to sleep with the one woman he cannot have - Kathryn ("Genie In A Bottle"). Should he lose, Kathryn will take his prized vintage Jaguar.

Annette meets Sebastian, as she is staying at his aunt's house, ("Just a Girl") and is surprised by his demeanour, as she has received letters warning her about his behaviour. He approaches his gay friend, Blaine Tuttle for advice; Blaine suggests the source of these letters might be Greg McConnell, a football player he is currently in a secretly relationship with ("I Want It That Way" or "Candy" or "Wannabe"). He agrees to set up a rendezvous and have Sebastian catch them, bribing Greg into revealing the source of the letters.

As part of her attempt to destroy Cecile's innocence, Kathryn suggests teaching her how to kiss at a picnic ("Kiss Me") but realises she has feelings for her cello teacher, Ronald Clifford. Sebastian continues his attempts to seduce Annette by buying her a gift and inviting her to swim with him, where she catches him nude whilst changing ("Lovefool"), before catching Blaine and Greg involved in intimacy ("Sex and Candy"). Greg says he will speak to Annette to find the source of the letters, but leaves Blaine ("Bye Bye Bye").

Cecile and Ronald's relationship is moving quickly ("Breakfast at Tiffany's") and he has been writing secret love letters to her. Cecile gives copies to Mrs. Caldwell, who is disgusted by this, as Ronald is black ("No Scrubs"). Kathryn decides to take matters further by getting Sebastian to seduce Cecile, in exchange for offering secret appointments with Ronald at her house, leading to Sebastian performing sexual acts on her ("Only Happy When It Rains").

Cecile visits Kathryn and explains that she has just had her first orgasm ("The Sign"); Mrs. Caldwell, equipped with the love letters, confronts Ronald, who leaves the house ("No Scrubs (Reprise)"). Sebastian and Kathryn give Ronald love letters written by Cecile ("I Don't Want To Wait"), as Sebastian continues to meet with her and 'teach' her how to have sex ("I'll Make Love To You").

Sebastian continues to pursue Annette, telling her that Mrs. Caldwell doesn't like him and is bias ("Torn"). Annette passionately kisses him and is about to seduce him, as he realises he cannot go through with it causing Annette to leave. He goes to see Kathryn, who realises that he has begun to fall in love with Annette. Blaine and Greg re-unite ("Sometimes"), as Sebastian calls Greg to find out where Annette has gone. Sebastian goes to find Annette at Penn Station ("Colorblind"); he tells her he is in love with her as they kiss and proceed to consummate their relationship.

Sebastian returns to find Kathryn in bed with Ronald; he leaves, as Kathryn tells Sebastian that he doesn't love her anymore now he is in love with Annette ("Sunday Morning"). She tells him that people cannot and do not change, and that he will destroy both their reputations. Sebastian, unsure as to what to do, goes to visit Annette ("Iris"). He tells her that it was all a lie, and that he just wanted to seduce her; she says he doesn't mean it ("Foolish Games").

Kathryn walks in to find Sebastian ready to seduce her with two glasses of champagne, as he has triumphed in the bet by having seduced Annette. Kathryn proceeds to tell him that she has actually triumphed over him, by making him ashamed of falling in love and ruining the relationship he craved ("Bitch"). He holds his journal storms off ("Losing My Religion") as Kathryn ("Kathryn's Turn Medley") rings Ronald and tells her that Sebastian has hit her, but also that he has had sex with Cecile.

Sebastian gives his journal to Annette ("Lovefool (Reprise)") and is about to reunite with him, as Ronald chases after him, full of rage and anger. The two fight, as a speeding car approaches - Sebastian pushes past Ronald to prevent Annette from getting hit by the car, and is struck. She holds him, as he dies.

Annette meets Cecile, and gives her Sebastian's journal. Later, Annette and Kathryn meet in a bathroom at Manchester Prep, dressed for Sebastian's memorial service; neither let the other know how much they know about each other. At the service, Kathryn is speaking about her step-brother and warning against the temptations of peer pressure ("Bittersweet Symphony") as pages copied from Sebastian's journal are handed out, led by Cecile. Blaine and Greg hold hands, as Sebastian's death has given Greg the confidence to come out. Mrs. Caldwell is shown the page with Kathryn's crucifix being a cocaine stash, rips it off of her, opening and emptying it.

Annette enters, wearing Sebastian's sunglasses, as the ghost of Sebastian enters. The cast leave, returning for bows ("Cruel Megamix").

== Musical numbers ==
Act I

- "Every You Every Me" (Placebo)
- "I'm the Only One" (Melissa Etheridge)
- "Genie In a Bottle" (Christina Aguilera)
- "Just a Girl" (No Doubt)
- "I Want It That Way" (The Backstreet Boys) (Sometimes exchanged with "Candy" (Mandy Moore) or "Wannabe" (Spice Girls) †))
- "Kiss Me" (Sixpence None The Richer)
- "Lovefool" (The Cardigans)
- "Sex and Candy" (Marcy Playground)†
- "I Want It That Way" (Backstreet Boys)/"Bye Bye Bye" (NSYNC)
- "Breakfast At Tiffany's" (Deep Blue Something)
- "No Scrubs" (TLC)
- "Only Happy When It Rains" (Garbage)/Act 1 Medley

Act II

- "The Sign" (Ace of Base)†
- "No Scrubs (Reprise)" (TLC)
- "I Don't Want To Wait" (Paula Cole)†
- "I'll Make Love To You" (Boyz II Men) (Sometimes exchanged with "2 Become 1" (Spice Girls †))
- "Torn" (Natalie Imbruglia version, originally by Ednaswap)
- "Sometimes" (Britney Spears)†
- "Colorblind" (Counting Crows)
- "Sunday Morning" (No Doubt) †
- "Iris" (Goo Goo Dolls)
- "Foolish Games" (Jewel)
- "Bitch" (Meredith Brooks)/"Losing My Religion" (R.E.M.)/Kathryn's Turn Medley
- "Lovefool (Reprise)" (The Cardigans) †
- "Bitter Sweet Symphony" (The Verve)
- "Cruel Megamix" ("The Sign"/"Bye Bye Bye") † ‡

† Not on the original cast recording.

‡ Not credited in all performances.

== Cast and creative ==
The musical was created by Jordan Ross Schindler, Lindsey Rosin (who also served as the original director), and Roger Kumble, choreographed by Jennifer Weber, with music supervision and arrangements by Zach Spound. The show was produced by Eva Price and Sucker Love Productions.

Character	Los Feliz (2015)	Hollywood (2016)	New York pop-up (2017)	Off-Broadway (2017-2018)	US Tour (2019)	Edinburgh Fringe Festival (2019)	LA Concert (2021)	Australia (2022-2023)	Off West End (2024)	UK/Ireland Tour (2025)	Argentina (2025)
Kathryn Merteuil	Katie Stevens; Lindsay Pearce; Janel Parrish	Katie Stevens	Jennifer Damiano	Lauren Zakrin	Taylor Pearlstein	Rebecca Gilhooley	Janel Parrish	Kirby Burgess	Rhianne-Louise McCaulsky	Nic Myers	Luli Gayá
Sebastian Valmont	Constantine Rousouli; John Krause; Brian Muller	Constantine Rousouli	Constantine Rousouli	Constantine Rousouli	Jeffrey Kringer	Dominic Andersen	Constantine Rousouli	Drew Weston	Daniel Bravo	Will Callan	Axel Munton
Annette Hargrove	Molly McCook	Molly McCook	Natalie Hall	Carrie St. Louis	Betsy Stewart	Sophie Issacs	Carrie St. Louis	Kelsey Halge	Abbie Budden	Abbie Budden	Valu Zapata
Cecile Caldwell	Shelley Regner; Emma Hunton	Shelley Regner	Janel Parrish	Jessie Shelton; Emma Hunton	Brooke Singer	Evelyn Hoskins	Emma Hunton	Francine Cain; Sarah Krndija	Rose Galbraith	Lucy Carter	Naia Giuliodoro
Blaine Tuttle	Tyler Scheef	John Krause	Alex Boniello	Alex Boniello; Frankie Grande	David Wright	Scott Hunter	Frankie Grande	Euan Fistrovic Doidge; Ross Chisari	Josh Barnett	Luke Connor Hall	Rodrigo Muñoz
Greg McConnell	Garrett Clayton; Spencer Strong Smith	Trent Mills	Brian Muller	Brian Muller	John Battagliese	Dean John-Wilson	Brian Logan Dales	Joseph Spanti	Barney Wilkinson	Joe Simmons	Federico Sorrentino
Ronald Clifford	Alexander Pimentel	Dominic Pierson	Jared Dixon	Matthew Griffin	Richard Crandle	Ashley Samuels	Israel Erron Ford	Rishab Kern	Nickcolia King-N'Da	Kevin Yates	Esteban Merdeni
Mrs. Bunny Caldwell	Pamela Holt; Leah Sprecher	Christine Lakin	Jenn Harris	Patricia Richardson; Jenn Harris	Dara Orland	Gemma Salter	Jenn Harris	Fem Belling	Jess Buckby	Gabriella Williams	Eugenia Molto

== Critical reception ==
The show was well received. The New York Times called the musical "funny and nostalgia-fueled" and noted that "the choice lines and the inspired soundtrack hits are all there in this enjoyable show". Entertainment Weekly complimented the show's use of '90s pop hits. InStyle Magazine described the show as "brilliant and magical", with "top-notch performances by a supremely talented cast".
