= Sarah Thompson (actress) =

American actress (born October 25, 1979)

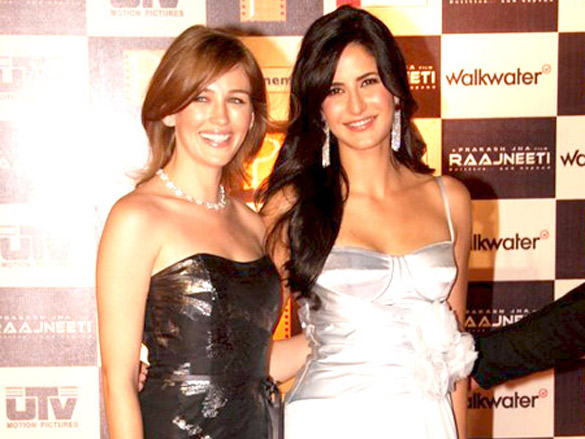
- Thompson (left) with Katrina Kaif at the premiere of Raajneeti, in 2010.
- Born: 1978 or 1979 (age 47–48)
- Occupation: Actress
- Years active: 1997–present
- Spouse: Brad Kane (m. 2007)
- Children: 2

Sarah Thompson (born 1978 or 1979) is an American actress. She is known for her roles as Eve in Angel (2003–2004) and as Rose in 7th Heaven (2005–2006).

== Biography ==
Thompson has also appeared in several films, including Cruel Intentions 2, Malibu's Most Wanted, Dear Me, Brutal, Broken Windows, Hansie, A Christmas Proposal, Taking Chance, Brooklyn's Finest, Break, The Pink Conspiracy and Raajneeti, a Bollywood movie.

She married Brad Kane on July 28, 2007; together they have one daughter and one son.

== Filmography ==
=== Film ===
Year	Title	Role	Notes
1997	The Ice Storm	Beth	
1999	A Wake in Providence	Erica	
2000	Cruel Intentions 2	Danielle Sherman	Direct to video film
2003	Malibu's Most Wanted	Krista	
2004	L.A. Twister	Cindy	
2007	The Pink Conspiracy	Katie	
2007	Brutal	Zoe	Direct to video film
2008	Break	The Woman	
2008	Babysitter Wanted	Angie Albright	
2008	Broken Windows	Katie	
2008	Hansie	Bertha Cronje	
2008	A Christmas Proposal	Reagan	
2009	Brooklyn's Finest	Sarie	
2010	Raajneeti	Sarah Jean Collins	Indian Film
2010	A Nanny for Christmas	Tina	Direct to video film

=== Television ===
Year	Title	Role	Notes
1997	Soul Man	Bobbi	Episodes: "The Lost Sheep Squadron", "Public Embarrassment and Todd's First Sermon"
1999	The Sopranos	Lucinda	Episode: "College"
1999	As the World Turns	Young Deena Silva	1 episode
2000	Madigan Men	Daria	Episode: "Pilot"
2000	FreakyLinks	Delaney Park	Episode: "Subject: Three Thirteen"
2000–2002	Boston Public	Dana Poole	Recurring role
2001	Going to California	Christina	Episode: "Rules of the Road"
2002	Touched by an Angel	Kristie	Episode: "Two Sides to Every Angel"
2003	The Division	Madeleine Bainbridge	Episode: "Body Double"
2003–2004	Line of Fire	Bambi	4 episodes
2003–2004	Angel	Eve	Recurring role
2005–2006	7th Heaven	Rosanna "Rose" Taylor	Main role
2007	Without a Trace	Lilly Dolan	Episode: "Crash and Burn"
2008	House	Nikki	Episode: "Last Resort"
2009	Taking Chance	Annie	TV movie
2010	All My Children	Cynthia	1 episode
2011	12 Wishes of Christmas	Faith	TV movie
2025	Your Friends and Neighbors	Susie Emerson	2 episodes
