= Scott Ziehl =

American film director

Scott Ziehl is an American film director.

Ziehl attended Santa Barbara Community College before graduating from UCLA in 1990 with a degree in political science and psychology. He began his career as a producer of straight-to-video films. His first feature film, Broken Vessels, was produced with a budget of $600,000 and won the Audience Award the 1998 Los Angeles Independent Film Festival. After the film's success, he was hired by Miramax to develop and direct the action film Airtime.

== Filmography ==
- 2012 - Shadow Witness
- 2008 - Exit Speed
- 2007 - Saints & Sinners (TV series)
- 2006 - Road House 2 (video)
- 2005 - Demon Hunter
- 2004 - Three Way
- 2004 - Cruel Intentions 3 (video)
- 2001 - Earth vs. the Spider (TV movie)
- 2001 - Proximity
- 1998 - Broken Vessels
