= Roger Kumble =

American film director and screenwriter

- Born: May 28, 1966 (age 60); Harrison, New York, U.S.
- Occupations: Film director, screenwriter
- Years active: 1994–2010; 2019–present
- Spouse: Mary Mehagian

Roger Kumble (born May 28, 1966) is an American film director, screenwriter, and playwright.

== Life and career ==
Kumble was raised in Harrison, New York, and attended Harrison High School. He graduated from Northwestern University in 1988, where he wrote for the Waa Mu show. He began his career as a playwright and director in 1993 with the Hollywood satire Pay or Play, which garnered him the LA Weekly Theater Award for Best Comic Writing. His second play, 1997's D Girl, starring David Schwimmer, earned him four Drama-Logue Awards. In 2003, Kumble completed his Hollywood trilogy with the critically acclaimed Turnaround, also starring Schwimmer, which sold out its entire run in Los Angeles. He returned to the theater in 2011 with his all female play Girls Talk, starring Brooke Shields and Constance Zimmer. Los Angeles Times critic Margaret Gray voted Girls Talk the best new play of 2011.

Kumble made his feature-film-directorial debut in 1999 with Sony Pictures' Cruel Intentions, starring Sarah Michelle Gellar, Ryan Phillippe, Reese Witherspoon and Selma Blair. His screenplay transposed the French novel Dangerous Liaisons to modern New York. In 2015, Cruel Intentions: The '90s Musical was adapted from his film, and had an extended run off-Broadway.

He returned in 2002 with the Sony comedy The Sweetest Thing, starring Blair, Cameron Diaz, Christina Applegate, Jason Bateman and Thomas Jane, followed by New Line Cinema's Just Friends in 2005, starring Ryan Reynolds, Anna Faris and Amy Smart. In 2009, both films were voted two of the top twenty underrated films of the decade by the New York Post. Kumble also directed Martin Lawrence, Raven-Symoné and Donny Osmond in Disney's 2008 family comedy College Road Trip, followed by 2010's Furry Vengeance, starring Shields and Brendan Fraser.

In the world of television, he has directed episodes of Entourage, Suits, Pretty Little Liars, Revenge and The Goldbergs. In 2019, Kumble directed two films: Netflix's Falling Inn Love, starring Christina Milian and Adam Demos, followed by Voltage Pictures' After We Collided. The latter was released in 2020 and became one of the biggest international box office successes of that year.

== Filmography ==
| Year | Title | Director | Writer |
|---|---|---|---|
| 1994 | Unveiled | No | Yes |
| 1995 | National Lampoon's Senior Trip | No | Yes |
| 1998 | Provocateur | No | Yes |
| 1999 | Cruel Intentions | Yes | Yes |
| 2000 | Cruel Intentions 2 | Yes | Yes |
| 2002 | The Sweetest Thing | Yes | No |
| 2005 | Just Friends | Yes | No |
| 2008 | College Road Trip | Yes | No |
| 2010 | Furry Vengeance | Yes | No |
| 2019 | Falling Inn Love | Yes | No |
| 2020 | After We Collided | Yes | No |
| 2023 | Beautiful Disaster | Yes | Yes |
| 2024 | Beautiful Wedding | Yes | Yes |
| 2026 | Love Me Love Me | Yes | No |

== Theater ==
- Pay or Play (1993; Hudson Theater, Los Angeles)
- D Girl (1997; Century City Playhouse, Los Angeles)
- Turnaround (2003; Coast Playhouse, Los Angeles)
- Girls Talk (2011; Lee Strasberg Theatre, Los Angeles)
