= Original Film =

Film production company

- Logo used since 2003
- Type: Private
- Industry: Film industry Entertainment
- Founded: 1990; 36 years ago
- Founders: Neal H. Moritz; Bruce Mellon
- Headquarters: Los Angeles, California, United States
- Area served: Worldwide
- Key people: Neal H. Moritz (CEO)
- Services: Film production Television production
- Website: www.originalfilm.com

Original Film is an American film and television production company co-founded by Neal H. Moritz in 1990. Notable films the company has produced include the I Know What You Did Last Summer, Cruel Intentions, Fast & Furious, Jump Street, and Sonic the Hedgehog franchises, and notable television shows the company have produced include Prison Break, S.W.A.T. and The Boys.

== History ==
Original Film was started out in the early 1990s by Neal H. Moritz and Bruce Mellon as a film producer and a commercial company.

In 1991, David Heyman joined as employee of the motion picture department. He later resigned to join Heyday Films. In 1993, Stokley Chaffin joined the company. He stayed on with the company for eight years until 2001.

In 1997, the studio struck a long-time partnership deal with Sony Pictures, and it remained until 2019. At the same time, Brad Luff joined the company. He left in 2003 to run Morgan Creek Productions. In 1998, the studio struck a deal with Newmarket Capital Group to produce lower-budget feature films.

In 1999, the studio made its first foray on television with the debut of Shasta McNasty. At the same time, Mark Rossen joined the company.

In 2002, Moritz launched a partnership with fellow talent agency Marty Adelstein to head a film and television managing company called Original, that comprises the assets of the company. Later that year, Dawn Parouse joined the company, and later the studio struck a deal with 20th Century Fox Television to produce television shows.

In 2004, the film and managing business has been split up. At the same time, Ori Marmur, formerly of Mandalay Pictures (in which the studio developed the I Know What You Did Last Summer films for Mandalay), joined the company. Two years later, Moritz struck a deal with Sony Pictures Television to produce television shows.

In 2017, the studio signed a feature film production deal with Paramount Pictures to produce feature films, starting in 2019. The deal was extended until 2023 in August 2020 and further until 2027 in April 2024.
