= Newmarket Capital Group =

Newmarket Capital Group, LLC. is a Los Angeles based film financing company. It formerly possessed a distribution subsidiary, Newmarket Films, which was eventually sold to Exclusive Media Group (which eventually re-named itself Exclusive Media).
