= Marquis de Sade bibliography =

French aristocrat, revolutionary, author

Donatien Alphonse François de Sade, best known as the Marquis de Sade, was a French aristocrat, revolutionary and author of philosophical and sadomasochistic novels exploring such controversial subjects as rape, bestiality and necrophilia. His works evidence a philosophical mind advocating a materialist philosophy in which Nature dictates absolute freedom, unrestrained by morality, religion or law, with the pursuit of personal pleasure as its foremost principle.

Besides novels, he wrote philosophical tracts, novellas, short stories, and a number of plays (many of which are no longer extant). Publication, dissemination, and translation of his works have long been hindered by censorship: not until 1983 were his works allowed unfettered distribution in the UK, for instance.

== Fiction ==
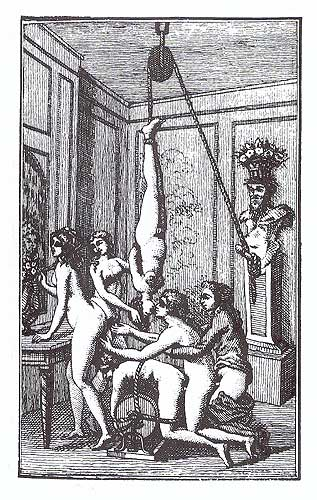
Illustration of a Dutch printing of the book Juliette by the Marquis de Sade, c. 1800

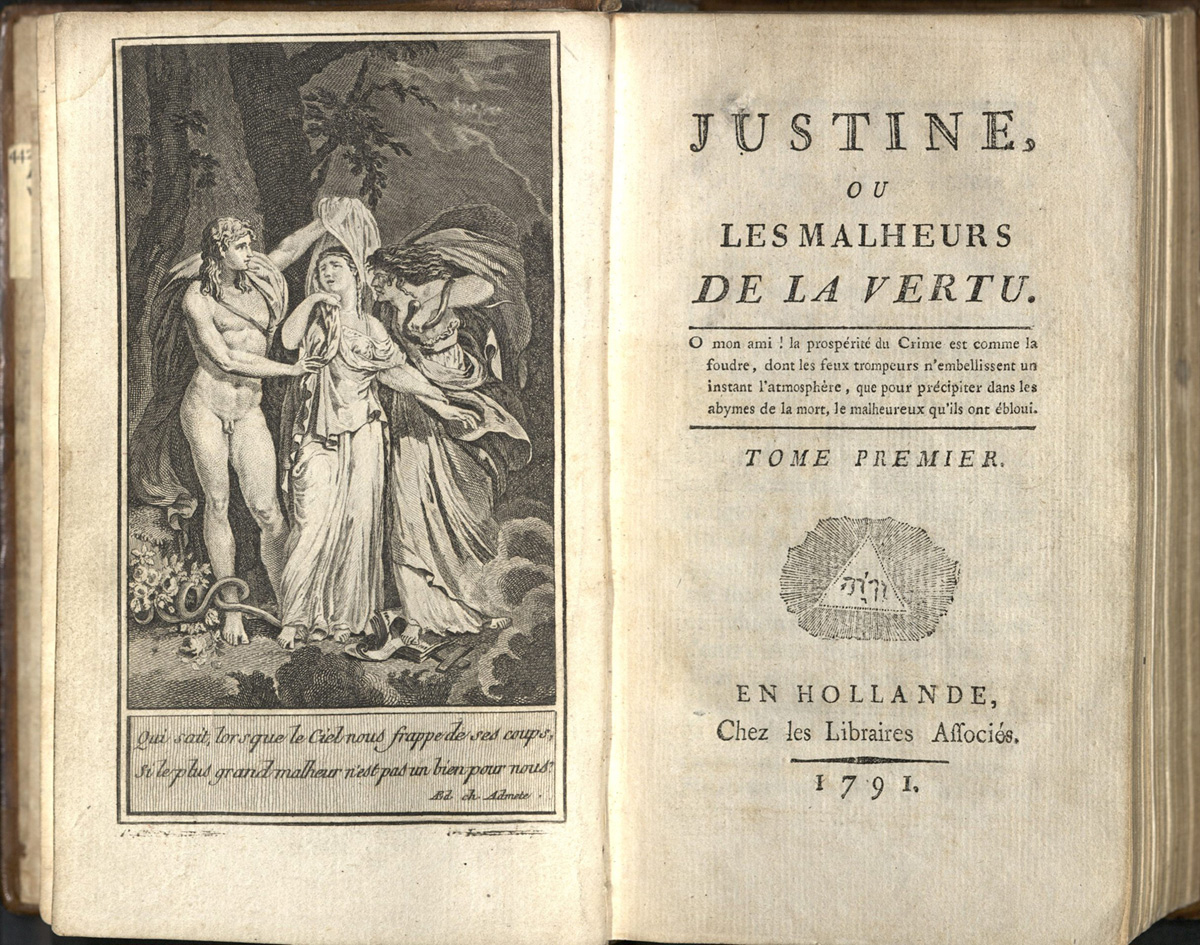
First page from Justine

=== Justine and Juliette Series ===
1. Justine (Les Infortunes de la vertu, novel, 1st version of Justine, 1787, pub. 1930)
2. Justine, or Good Conduct Well-Chastised (Justine ou les Malheurs de la vertu, novel, 2nd version of Justine, 1788, pub. 1791)
3. One hundred and eleven notes on the New Justine (1791)
4. The New Justine (La Nouvelle Justine, ou les Malheurs de la vertu, novel, 3rd version of Justine, pub. 1797–1801 with Juliette) - untranslated as of yet
5. Juliette, or Vice Amply Rewarded (Histoire de Juliette, ou les Prospérités du vice, novel, sequel of La Nouvelle Justine, pub. 1797–1801)
6. Juliette et Raunai, ou la Conspiration d’Amboise, nouvelle historique published in Les Crimes de l'amour, Nouvelles héroïques et tragiques, novellas, pub. 1800) - untranslated as of yet

=== Novels and novella ===
- Dialogue Between a Priest and a Dying Man (Dialogue entre un prêtre et un moribond, 1782, pub. 1926)
- The 120 Days of Sodom, or the School of Licentiousness (Les 120 journées de Sodome, ou l'École du libertinage, 1785, pub. 1904)
- Dorci, ou la Bizarrerie du sort (novella, 1788, pub. 1881)
- Aline and Valcour (Aline et Valcour, ou le Roman philosophique, epistolary novel, 1788, pub. 1795; English translation pub. 2019)
- Philosophy in the Bedroom (La Philosophie dans le boudoir, novel in dialogues, pub. 1795)
- La Marquise de Gange (1807–1812, pub. 1813)
- Adélaïde de Brunswick, princesse de Saxe (1812, pub. 1964)
- Histoire secrète d’Isabelle de Bavière, reine de France (1813, pub. 1953)

=== Collections ===
- The Crimes of Love (Les Crimes de l'amour, Nouvelles héroïques et tragiques, novellas, pub. 1800)
  - Introduction
    - Une Idée sur les romans
  - Vol. I
    - Juliette et Raunai, ou la Conspiration d’Amboise, nouvelle historique
    - La Double Épreuve
  - Vol. II
    - Miss Henriette Stralson, ou les Effets du désespoir, nouvelle anglaise
    - Faxelange, ou les Torts de l'ambition
    - Florville et Courval, ou le Fatalisme
  - Vol. III
    - Rodrigue, ou la Tour enchantée, conte allegorique
    - Laurence et Antonio, nouvelle italienne
    - Ernestine, nouvelle suedoise
  - Vol. IV
    - Dorgeville, ou le Criminel par vertu
    - La Comtesse de Sancerre, ou la Rivale de sa fille, anecdote de la Cour de Bourgogne
    - Eugénie de Franval. (in 2003, an English translation was published by Hesperus Classics under the title of Incest)
- Historiettes, Contes et Fabliaux (1788, pub. 1926)
  - Historiettes
    - Le Serpent
    - La Saillie Gasconne
    - L’Heureuse Feinte
    - Le M… puni
    - L'Évêque embourbé
    - Le Revenant
    - Les Harangueurs Provençaux
    - Attrapez-moi toujours de même
    - L'Époux complaisant
    - Aventure incompréhensible
    - La Fleur de châtaignier
  - Contes et Fabliaux
    - L’Instituteur philosophe
    - La Prude, ou la Rencontre imprévue
    - Émilie de Tourville, ou la Cruauté fraternelle
    - Augustine de Villeblanche, ou le Stratagème de l’amour
    - Soit fait ainsi qu’il est requis
    - Le Président mystifié
    - La Marquise de Thélème, ou les Effets du libertinage
    - Le Talion
    - Le Cocu de lui-même, ou le Raccommodement imprévu
    - Il y a place pour deux
    - L'Époux corrigé
    - Le Mari prêtre
    - La Châtelaine de Longeville, ou la Femme vengée
    - Les Filous
  - Appendice
    - Les Dangers de la bienfaisance

=== Plays ===
- Oxtiern, The Misfortunes of Libertinage (1800) (Le Comte Oxtiern ou les Effets du Libertinage)
- Les Jumelles ou le /choix difficile
- Le Prevaricateur ou le Magistrat du temps passe
- Jeanne Laisne, ou le Siege de Beauvais
- L'Ecole des jaloux ou la Folle Epreuve
- Le Misanthrope par amour ou Sophie et Desfrancs
- Le Capricieux, ou l'Homme inegal
- Les Antiquaires
- Franchise et Trahison
- Fanny, ou les Effets du desespoir
- La Tour mysterieuse
- L'Union des arts ou les Ruses de l'amour
- Les Fetes de l'amitie

== Destroyed / lost works ==
=== Miscellaneous ===
- Le Portefeuille d'un homme de lettres
- Les Journees de Florbelle, ou la Nature devoilee, suivies des Memoires de l'abbe de Modose et des Adventures d'Emilie de Volnange servant de preuves aux assertions
  - Les Conversations du chateau de Charmelle (First Draft of Les Journees Florbelle
- Les Delassements du libertin, ou la Neuvaine de Cythere
- La Fine Mouche
- L'Heureux Echange
- Les Inconvenients de la pitie
- Les Reliques
- Le Cure de Prato
- Les Caprices, ou un peu de tout

=== Short stories ===
- La Liste du Suisse
- La Messe trop chere
- L'Honnete Ivrogne
- N'y allez jamais sans lumiere
- La justice venitienne
- Adelaide de Miramas, ou le Fanatisme protestan

=== Plays ===
- Henriette et Saint-Clair, ou la Force du Sang
- La Fille malheureuse
- Divertissement
- L'Egarement de l'infortune
- Tancrede

== Non-fiction ==
The following works were written between 1764 and 1769

- Le Philosophe soi-disant

=== Travelogues ===
- Voyage d'Italie
- Voyage de Hollande

=== Essays ===
- Reflections on the Novel (Idee sur les romans, introductory text to Les Crimes de l'Amour)
- The Author of Les Crimes de l'Amour to Villeterque, Hack Writer (1803) (L'Auteur de "Les Crimes de l'Amour" a Villeterque, folliculaire)

=== Political pamphlets ===
- Addresse d'un citoyen de Paris, au roi des Français (1791)
- Section des Piques. Observations presentées à l'Assemblee administrative des hopitaux (28 octobre 1792)
- Section des Piques. Idée sur le mode de la sanction des Lois; par un citoyen de cette Section (2 novembre 1792)
- Pétition des Sections de Paris à la Convention nationale (1793)
- Section des Piques. Extraits des Registres des déliberations de l'Assemblée générale et permanente de la Section des Piques (1793)
- La Section des Piques à ses Frères et Amis de la Société de la Liberté et de l'Égalite, à Saintes, département de la Charente-Inferieure (1793)
- Section des Piques. Discours prononcé par la Section des Piques, aux manes de Marat et de Le Pelletier, par Sade, citoyen de cette section et membre de la Société populaire (1793)
- Petition de la Section des Piques, aux representants de peuple français (1793)

=== Letters and personal notes posthumously published ===
- Letters From Prison
- Correspondance inédite du Marquis de Sade, de ses proches et de ses familiers, publiée avec une introduction, des annales et des notes par Paul Bourdin (1929)
- L'Aigle, Mademoiselle..., Lettres publiées pour la première fois sur les manuscrits autographes inédits avec une Préface et un Commentaire par Gilbert Lely (1949)
- Le Carillon de Vincennes. Lettres inédites publiées avec des notes par Gilbert Lely (1953)
- Cahiers personnels (1803–1804). Publiés pour la première fois sur les manuscrits autographes inédits avec une préface et des notes par Gilbert Lely (1953)
- Monsieur le 6. Lettres inédites (1778–1784) publiées et annotées par Georges Daumas. Préface de Gilbert Lely (1954)
- Cent onze Notes pour La Nouvelle Justine. Collection "La Terrain vague," no. IV (1956)

=== Uncertain/misattributions ===
- Theory of Libertinage
- Zoloé
