= Philippe Chéry =

French painter (1759–1838)

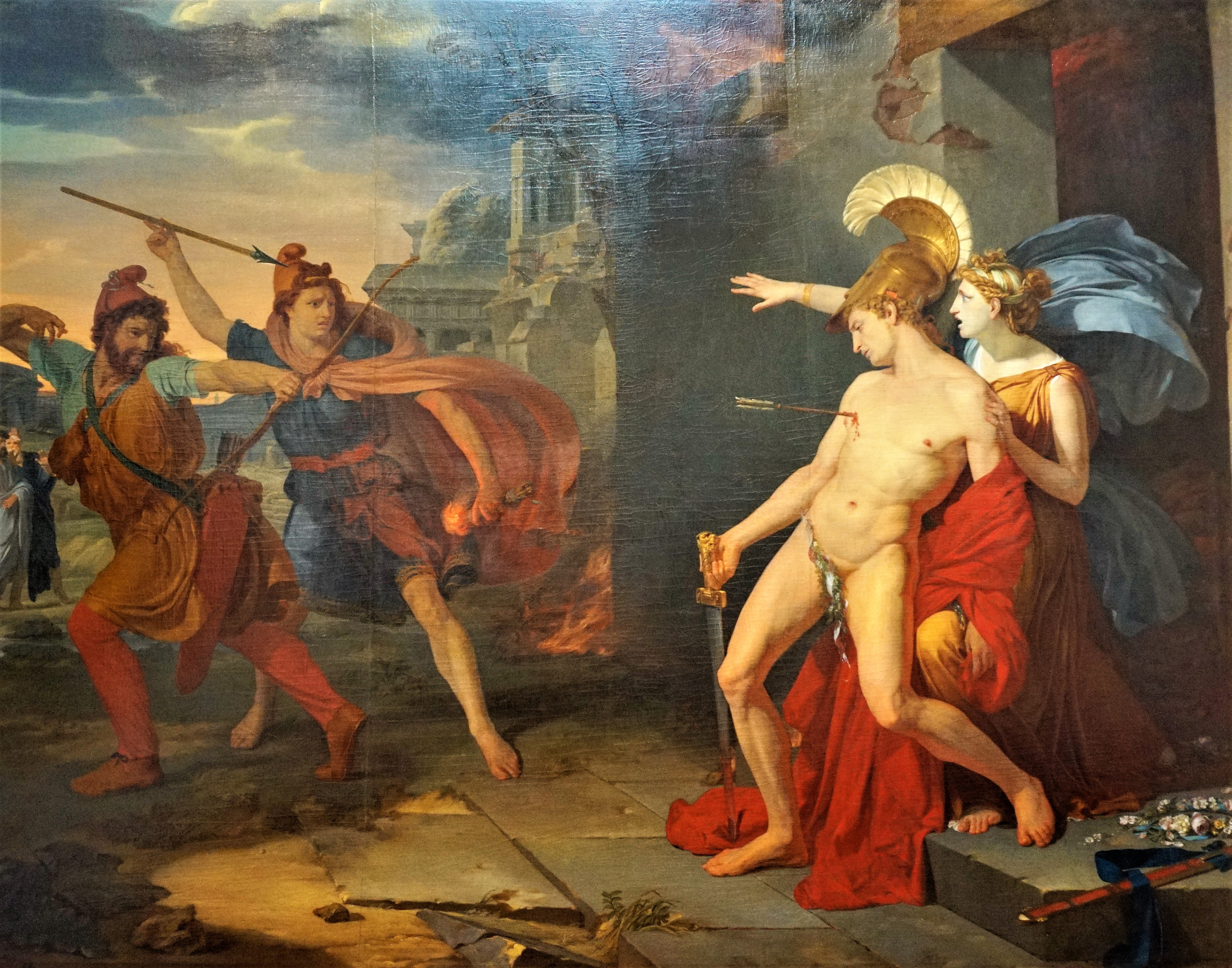
La mort d'Alcibiade. Philippe Chéry, 1791. Musée des Beaux-Arts, La Rochelle.

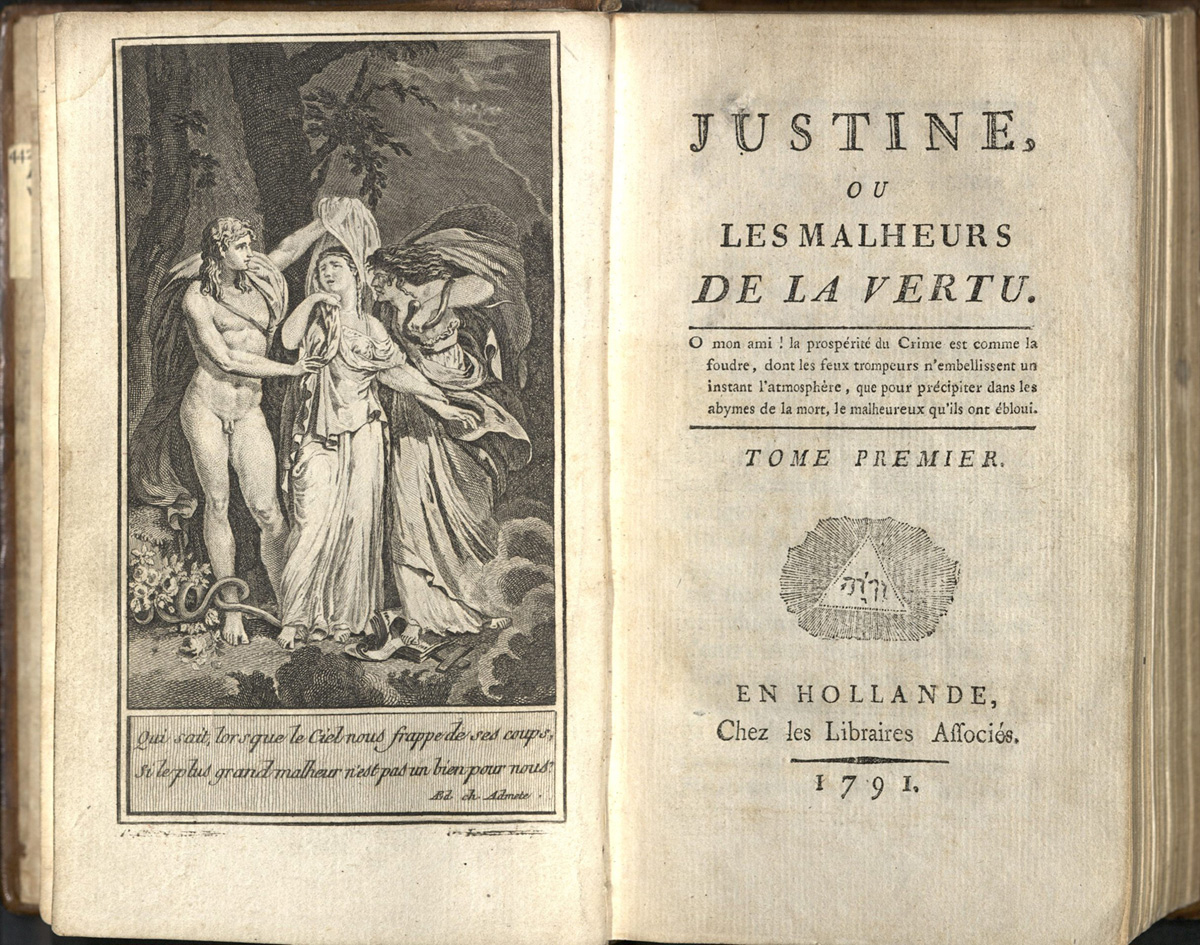
First page from the first edition of Justine by the Marquis de Sade, with a frontispiece by Chéry.

Philippe Chéry (1759–1838) was a French historical and portrait painter, and a pupil of Joseph-Marie Vien. He was born in Paris, took an active part in the French Revolution, was wounded at the siege of the Bastille, and on the 18th Brumaire left France, to which he did not return until 1802. He painted The Annunciation in the church of Generville, St. Benedict receiving the Viaticum, and two other religious subjects, which are in the church of Boulogne-sur-Mer, St. Cecilia, in the Benedictine Convent in the same town, and several other scriptural and religious subjects. He also painted The Treaty of Amiens, for which he received the prize of 12,000 francs in the competition in the year XI (1803); The Death of the Father of Louis XVI., exhibited in 1817; Thrasybulus Re-establishing the Democratic Government at Athens, which passed into England, The Death of Alcibiades, The Birth of Venus, The Toilet of Venus, and portraits of many of the men of mark of the time. He died in Paris in 1838.
