= Historiettes, Contes et Fabliaux =

Historiettes, Contes et Fabliaux (English: Stories, Tales and Fables) are a set of short tales written by the Marquis de Sade while imprisoned in the Bastille. The dates of the tales range from 1787 to 1788. They were published in a collected edition for the first time in 1926 together with Dialogue Between a Priest and a Dying Man (written in 1782).

== History ==
Despite it having been written after de Sade's Les 120 journées de Sodome ou l'école du libertinage and Justine, the collection features little of the graphic display, elaborate torture and overall sadism that typically characterize de Sade's writing. The stories range from simple anecdotical tales with plot twists to clever softcore comedy and even some fantastic literature. Nevertheless, de Sade's trademark disdain for religion, morality and the French government remains, as does his sexually themed narrative and devotion to nature as an excuse for the ways of the libertine.

== Synopsis ==
The anthology is divided in two parts – Historiettes (consisting of 11 short stories) and Contes et Fabliaux (consisting of 14 short stories), as well as an appendice.

Historiettes features all stories dealing with the fantastic (Le serpent, Le revenant and Aventure incompréhensible) as well as the shorter, anecdotical-like ones (Attrapez-moi toujours de même, La Fleur de châtaignier).

Contes et Fabliaux features the more sadistic stories in the vein of de Sade's better known works. One in particular, Le Président mystifié ("The Mystified Magistrate"), is the longest of the collection and due to its length and structure is sometimes considered a nouvelle of its own. The tale revolves around the title [gullible] magistrate, his upcoming marriage to a woman who (unbeknownst to him) does not desire him, and the series of practical jokes, hoaxes and elaborate schemes that the woman's brother-in-law (the marquis d'Olincourt) perpetrates against the magistrate in order to stop the wedding.

== Contents ==
Historiettes

- Le Serpent
- La Saillie Gasconne
- L’Heureuse Feinte
- Le M… puni
- L'Évêque embourbé
- Le Revenant
- Les Harangueurs Provençaux
- Attrapez-moi toujours de même
- L'Époux complaisant
- Aventure incompréhensible
- La Fleur de châtaignier

Contes et Fabliaux

- L’Instituteur philosophe
- La Prude, ou la Rencontre imprévue
- Émilie de Tourville, ou la Cruauté fraternelle
- Augustine de Villeblanche, ou le Stratagème de l’amour
- Soit fait ainsi qu’il est requis
- Le Président mystifié
- La Marquise de Thélème, ou les Effets du libertinage
- Le Talion
- Le Cocu de lui-même, ou le Raccommodement imprévu
- Il y a place pour deux
- L'Époux corrigé
- Le Mari prêtre
- La Châtelaine de Longeville, ou la Femme vengée
- Les Filous

Appendice

- Les Dangers de la bienfaisance
