= Marguerite Gourdan =

French brothel owner

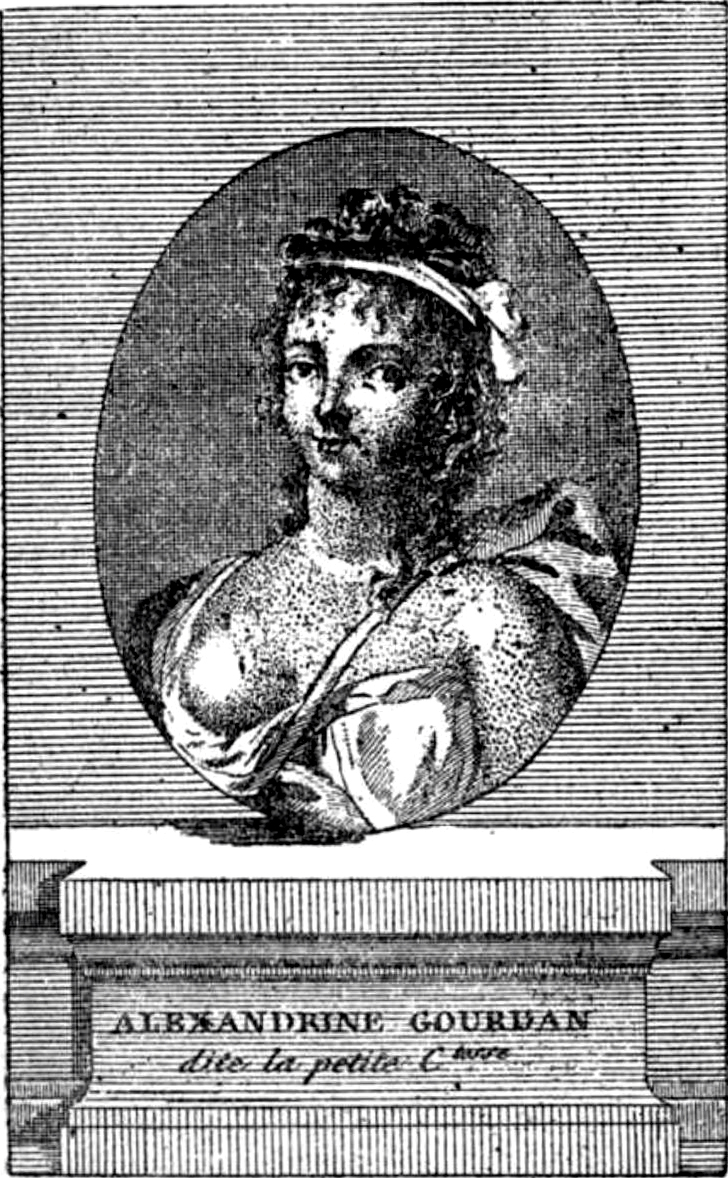
- 18th century engraving of Marguerite Gourdan
- Born: Marguerite Alexandrine Ernestine Stock c. 1730; Béziers, France
- Died: September 28, 1783; Paris, France
- Other names: la petite comtesse
- Occupation: Brothel madam

Marguerite Gourdan, née Marguerite Alexandrine Ernestine Stock (c. 1730 in Béziers – 28 September 1783 in Paris) was a French brothel owner and procurer in 18th-century Paris. Her brothel was the most exclusive in Paris during that age, and Gourdan was arguably the most famous of her profession.

== Early life ==
Marguerite Gourdan was the daughter of merchant Sebastien Stock (or Estocq) and Jeanne Maslot, who had married at Larzincourt on 30 April 1725. She was the second child of 10 to 12 siblings.

Gourdan started work in a fashion store but went to Paris in the company of a young officer who soon left her. She married captain François-Didier Gourdan on 13 November 1748 in Larzincourt. Gourdan worked in a tobacconist until she had a violent dispute with her employers, a couple named Diodé, on 15 July 1756. With the consent of her spouse, she prostituted herself. She met a gentleman officer at the Guards, with whom she had a daughter. As a result of this birth, the officer provided her with an annual allowance of six thousand livres, and gave her jewels and diamonds worth more than forty thousand livres.

== Brothels ==
The allowance ceased after the death of the nobleman in 1759. Later that year, Gourdan opened a house of prostitution in the rue Sainte-Anne. The brothel had a certain luxury and one of its first customers is the knight Jean-Baptiste Du Barry. Jeanne Bécu, later Madame du Barry, King Louis XV's last official mistress (Maîtresse-en-titre), is said to have worked in Gourdan's house for a while.

Dreaming of a house larger than the one in rue Sainte-Anne, Gourdan moved to rue Comtesse-d'Artois in 1763, (Note: Part of the current Rue Montorgueil between Rue de Turbigo and Rue Mauconseil) in a building then owned by a grocer named Marion. During her time in this street she gained the nickname of "Countess" or "Little Countess".

The author of Les Sérails de Paris describes her as:

"Her figure was slender, and her whole person inspired an air of voluptuousness which summons and commands the desire. Her teasing eyes gave off features which seldom failed in their purpose and manners, and her discourse announced that it would be of advantage in a theatre more worthy of its charms and its spirit."

Gourdan separated from her spouse in 1765 and, on 9 March 1765, was granted a separation of property from her husband.

Three years later, on 4 January 1768, a fire destroyed part of the furniture in Gourdan's living room. Early in 1773 she was sent to the Bicêtre Hospital, specially set up to treat people, especially prostitutes, suffering from venereal diseases. During her stay she met another woman, known for her beauty, wit and debauchery: Justine Paris. The enforced stay in the hospital enabled them to meditate on the disadvantages of the profession, and they considered a means likely to remedy it. They planned the founding of a unique prostitution establishment, of which Justine Paris would be the "mother abbess" and Gourdan her "coadjutrix".

=== 23 rue Dussoubs ===
As soon as they left the hospital, the two women began to execute their plan. In 1774, on the corner of Rue Saint-Sauveur and rue des Deux-Portes (now rue Dussoubs), they established a temple dedicated to the goddess Venus with all the luxury and comfort available at the time. It was adjoined by a rich and ancient hotel owned by Charles-François Baude. The building's sober façade inspired confidence, it housed an antique shop in which a staircase led to the first floor, through which distinguished visitors could enter discreetly. The house was to become the most famous brothel in 18th century France.

Justine Paris did not benefit from this new partnership for long. In November 1773, she died, carried away by the syphilis that had led her to Bicêtre. Gourdan gave a funeral oration in her honour on 14 November 1773 at a gathering of Paris's elite prostitutes and madams organised by the Prince of Conti at his residence. Gourdan did not consider taking a new partner and continued to manage the establishment alone. She quickly set up a network of procurers in both the provinces and the capital. She lodged and fed her boarders who worked in the brothel, to whom she was known as "mother." In addition, she supplied the apparel necessary for their trade.

Gourdan enacted twenty articles that the residents must adhere to. In addition, she wrote a set of instructions "for a young lady who wants to make a fortune with the charms she has received from nature".

Outside the house, Gourdan had many women who worked in private apartments, ready to go to men who did not want to go to rue Dussoubs, or to accompany them to "suppers" in town. This outside group of courtesans attached to Gourdan's house called her "Legion". Among them were many young ladies from the troupe of the Academy of Music, who, since the founding of the Paris Opera, were renowned for their easy virtue. In a third system of recruitment, some of the more unscrupulous of the bourgeoisie agreed to bring their daughters to rue des Deux-Portes. Finally, the spouses of rich men who wished to earn their own money, constitute a fourth type in the Gourdan empire.

Gourdan did not only procure female for male customers, but also females for female customers, as well as male prostitutes for male customers. She also provided sexual toys for clients of both sexes. Gourdan is credited with designing a wooden phallus called the "nuns heirloom". At the time of her death she was reputed to have had many orders for the heirloom unfulfilled.

Apart from prostitution, Gourdan also provided rooms to partners who were not prostitutes but who had difficulties finding a safe place to meet because their relationship was not accepted, for example married women and their lovers. This was not a small part of her business, but an important and lucrative part of it.

Amongst Gourdan's clients were royalty, the nobility, academics and clergymen. Casanova was also a frequent visitor.

As well as the best women, rue Dussoubs was known for its fine dining and wines. After Gourdan's death, six hundred bottles of Burgundy, forty-two of Bordeaux and seventy of Champagne were found in the cellar.

Gourdan also had a villa at Villiers-le-Bel where she sent her sick or pregnant prostitutes. It was known by the locals as "the convent".

=== Decline ===
On 6 September 1775, Parlement issued a summons for Marguerite Gourdan. The charges were that she had taken into her house Mme d'Oppy, the wife of the grand bailiff of Douai. Gourdan did not wait to be arrested. Five days after the pronouncement of the warrant, 11 September 1775, the Little Countess dismissed her staff, closed her establishment and fled.

Parlement visited the brothel after she failed to appear in court. They concluded that she was "duly attained and convicted of shameful commerce, mockery and public prostitution, and again of having debauched, and attracted young girls to prostitute them from her home". She is condemned in her absence "to be taken to the ordinary and accustomed places of the City of Paris, and in particular to the Petit Carreaux intersections, the nearest to her dwelling. Mounted on a donkey and face turned towards the tail, having on her head a hat of straw with a sign in front and behind bearing these words: "MAQUERELLE PUBLIQUE" and to be then beaten also with rods by the Executor of the High Justice in the so-called usual crossroads, and at the crossroads of the Petits-Carreaux to be branded on her right shouldeer with a hot iron in the shape of a fleur-de-lis. This done, to be banished for nine years from the City and Prévoté and Vicomté de Paris".

An effigy of Marguerite Gourdan was mounted on a donkey with all the decorum prescribed; then the manikin was beaten of importance at the designated junction to the booing and licentious cries of the populace.

In the first days of August 1776, Gourdan returned to Paris and was imprisoned. In her defence, the testimony of the Duke of Chartres, the Prince de Conti, the Marshal Duke of Richelieu, the Duke of Fronsac and other numerous noble personages, prelates and magistrates was heard. The President of Gourges granted her absolution on 19 August 1776. The luxurious brothel was soon reopened. For a few months, the salons and boudoirs were visited by the old regulars, but from the early days of 1777, Gourdan's fortunes declined. Within a year the establishment was closed, the competition had not been inactive, and rival houses attracted the wealthy clientele by striving to treat them better than they were at rue Dussoubs.

== Death ==
Gourdan was made bankrupt in May 1778. On 28 November that year, Marguerite Gourdan died in a bedroom on the first floor of her home on the rue Dussoubs. Her death was caused by complications of syphilis.

A song was composed about her funeral:

Noble mackerel and pox,
Versailles, Paris are panicked!
We all mourn this morning
For this so-called hussy.
Yes, Gourdan the madam is dead,
Is dead as she had lived,
The cock in the ass
The hearse is at her door
Escorted by three hundred whores
The pine in hands.

A collection of letters between Gourdan and her clients, called Correspondance de Madame Gourdan, dite la petite comtesse was published in 1883.

== Sources ==
- Bloch, Iwan (2002). Marquis de Sade: His Life and Works. The Minerva Group, Inc. ISBN 9781589635678.
- Burrows, Simon (2010). A King's Ransom: The Life of Charles Théveneau de Morande, Blackmailer, Scandalmonger & Master-Spy. Bloomsbury Publishing. ISBN 9781441178961.
- Ellis, Catherine Rose (2018). Sex Work And Ingestion In Eighteenth-Century France (PDF) (Thesis). Durham University.
- Gregg, John R. (2018). Sex, the Illustrated History: Through Time, Religion, and Culture: Volume Iii; Sex in the Modern World; Europe from the 17Th Century to the 21St Century, Colonial North and South America to the 21St Century, Slavery and Homosexual Histories, and Bisexuality. ISBN 9781984524195.
- Karkra, B. K. (2012). The Origin of Religions: An Open-Eyed Journey Through a Mystic World. AuthorHouse. ISBN 9781467880770.
- de Morande, Charles Théveneau; Uzanne, Octave, eds. (1883). Correspondance de Madame Gourdan, dite la petite comtesse: pour servir à l'histoire des moeurs du siècle, et principalement de celles de Paris (in French). H. Kistemaeckers.
- Murphy, Colin (2018). Fierce History: 5,000 years of startling stories from Ireland and around the globe. The O'Brien Press Ltd. ISBN 9781788490689.
- Les Sérails de Paris, ou vies et portraits des dames Pâris, Gourdan, Montigni, Et autres appareilleuses: Ouvrage contenant la description de leurs Sérails, leurs intrigues et les Aventures des plus fameuses Courtisannes, le tout entremêlé de réflexions et de conseils pour prémunir la jeunesse et les Etrangers contre les dangers du libertinage (in French). Hogquart. 1802.
