= Chance and Necessity =

1970 book by Jacques Monod

Chance and Necessity: Essay on the Natural Philosophy of Modern Biology
- Author: Jacques Monod
- Genre: Biology, Philosophy
- Publisher: Éditions du Seuil
- Publication date: 1970

Chance and Necessity: Essay on the Natural Philosophy of Modern Biology (French: Le Hasard et la Nécessité: Essai sur la philosophie naturelle de la biologie moderne) is a 1970 book by Nobel Prize winner Jacques Monod. Aimed at a general audience, the book describes the basic characteristics of life, reviews findings of modern biochemistry and molecular biology, and argues that life arose by blind chance guided by natural selection, could not have been predicted, and does not have a higher purpose. The author concludes that traditional philosophical or religious systems of value, explanation and meaning are untenable, and advocates for an "ethic of knowledge": committing to objectivity in the pursuit of knowledge.

According to the introduction, the book's title was inspired by a line attributed to Democritus, "Everything existing in the universe is the fruit of chance and necessity."

== Summary ==
Monod starts the preface of the book by saying that biology is both marginal and central. He goes on to explain that it is marginal because the living world is only a fraction of the universe. Monod believes the ultimate aim of science is to "clarify man's relationship to the universe" (Monod, xi), and from that reasoning he accords biology a central role. He goes on to state that he does not intend to make a thorough survey of modern biology but rather to "bring out the form of its key concepts and to point out their logical relationships with other areas of thought…it is an avowed attempt to extract the quintessence of the molecular theory of the code" (Monod, xiii). Monod stresses the importance of the molecular theory of the genetic code as a physical theory of heredity and brands it as the "secret of life". He continues to explain how this important discovery has made it the duty of scientists to share with and enhance other disciplines of thought such as philosophy. Toward the end of the preface Monod offers an apology for any overly tedious or technical sections. He also warns that some ethical and political ideas he presents may seem naïve or ambitious but then states "Modesty benefits the scientist, but not the ideas that inhabit him and which he is under the obligation of upholding" (Monod, xiv). In the last paragraph of the preface, Monod explains that his essay developed from the Robins Lectures that he gave in 1969 at Pomona College.

=== Of strange objects ===
Monod starts off chapter I entitled "Of Strange Objects" with a consideration of the difference between natural and artificial objects and states that "the basic premise of the scientific method... [is] that nature is objective and not projective" (Monod, 3). Through a series of thought experiments and rhetorical questions, he leads the reader on a difficult path to three characteristics of living beings. One is teleonomy which Monod defines as the characteristic of being "endowed with a purpose or project" (Monod, 9). Another is autonomous morphogenesis, which points out that a living being's structure results from interactions within the being, as opposed to the external forces that shape artificial artifacts. Monod offers a single exception to this last criterion in the form of a crystal and, at this point, he states that the internal forces that determine structure within living beings are "of the same nature as the microscopic interactions responsible for crystalline morphologies" (Monod, 11), a theme that he promises to develop in later chapters. The last general property Monod offers up as distinguishing living organisms is reproductive invariance which is the ability of a living being to reproduce and transmit the information corresponding to their own highly ordered structure. The author defines the primary telonomic project "as consisting in the transmission from generation to generation of the invariance content characteristic of the species" (Monod, 14) (the preservation and multiplication of the species). Monod later retracts autonomous morphogenesis (spontaneous structuration) as a property of living beings and says instead that it should be thought of as "mechanism" leaving two essential properties of living beings: reproductive invariance and structural teleonomy. He then brings up and defends against a possible thermodynamic objection to reproductive invariance and points out the extreme efficiency of the teleonomic apparatus in accomplishing the preservation and reproduction of the structure. Here the author restates that nature is objective and does not pursue an end or have a purpose and he points out an apparent "epistemological [the study of the origin, nature, methods, and limits of human knowledge] contradiction" between the teleonomic character of living organisms and the principle of objectivity. With that cliffhanger of internal intellectual struggle Monod ends chapter one.

=== Vitalisms and animisms ===
In chapter two "Vitalisms and Animisms" Monod states that invariance must have preceded teleonomy, a conclusion reached by the Darwinian idea that teleonomic structures are due to variations in structures that already had the property of invariance and could therefore preserve the effects of chance mutations. He offers the selective theory as being consistent with the postulate of objectivity and allowing for epistemological coherence. The author then says that in the rest of the chapter he will address religious ideologies and philosophical systems that assume the reverse hypothesis: that invariance developed out of an initial teleonomic principle (this defies the principle of objectivity).

He divides these theories into vitalist, in which the teleonomic principle operates only in living matter (there is a purpose/direction in which living things alone develop), and animist, in which there is a universal teleonomic principle (that is expressed more intensely in the biosphere and therefore living beings are seen as products of universally oriented evolution which has culminated in mankind). Monod admits he is more interested in animism and will therefore devote more analysis to it. He briefly discusses the murky metaphysical vitalism of Henri Bergson and then discusses the scientific vitalism of Elsasser and Polanyi which contend that physical forces and chemical interactions that have been studied in non-living matter do not fully account for invariance and teleonomy and therefore other "biotonic laws" are at work in living matter. The author points out that the scientific vitalist argument lacks support and that it draws its justification not from knowledge or observations but from our present day lack of knowledge. He goes on to point out that today the mechanism of invariance is sufficiently understood to the point that no non-physical principle ("biotonic law") is needed for its interpretation.

Monod next points out that our ancestors had a history of animating objects by giving spirits to them so as to bridge the apparent gap between the living and non-living. To them, a being made sense and was understandable only through the purpose animating the being and so, if mysterious objects, such as rocks, rivers, rain, and stars, exist it must also be for a purpose (essentially there are no inanimate objects to them). The author says that this animist belief is due to a projection of man's awareness of his own teleonomic functioning onto inanimate nature. Nature is explained with the same conscious and purposive manner as human activity. Monod points out that this animist line of thought is still present in philosophy that makes no essential distinction between matter and life and frames biological evolution as a component of cosmic evolution (evolutive force operating throughout the entire universe). He contends that these lines of thought abandon the postulate of objectivity and also contain the anthropocentric illusion.

At the end of this chapter Monod states that the thesis he "shall present in this book is that the biosphere does not contain a predictable class of objects or of events but constitutes a particular occurrence, compatible indeed with first principles, but not deducible from those principles and therefore essentially unpredictable" (Monod, 43). In his view, the biosphere is unpredictable for the same reason that the particular configuration of atoms in a pebble are unpredictable. By this Monod does not mean to imply that the biosphere is not explicable from initial conditions/first principles but that it is not deducible (at best predictions could be no more than statistical probabilities of existence). He then points out that society is willing to accept a universal theory that is compatible with but does not foresee the particular configuration of atoms in a pebble but it is a different story when it comes to humans: "We would like to think ourselves necessary, inevitable, ordained from all eternity. All religions, nearly all philosophies, and even a part of science testify to the unwearying, heroic effort of mankind desperately denying its own contingency" (Monod, 44). It is this contingency of human existence that is the central message of Chance and Necessity, that life arose by chance and all beings of life, including humans, are the products of natural selection.

=== Maxwell's Demons ===
The third chapter is named "Maxwell's Demons". It starts off by stating that proteins are the molecular agents of teleonomic performance in living beings. Monod continues by writing that living beings are chemical machines, every organism constitutes a coherent and functional unit, and that the organism is a self-constructing machine whose macroscopic structure is not determined by outside forces but by autonomous internal interactions.

The author spends much of the chapter reviewing general facts of biochemistry. He explains that proteins are composed of 100-10,000 amino acids and he distinguishes between elongated fibrous proteins that play a mechanical role and the more numerous globular proteins that are folded upon themselves. He talks about the extraordinary specificity of action that enzymes display as exemplified by their ability to not only recognize a specific geometric isomer but an optical isomer as well. He points out that enzymes are optically active themselves, L isomers are the "natural" isomers, and that the specificity of action and the stereospecificity of the reaction conducted by an enzyme are the result of the positioning of the molecules with respect to each other.

Monod writes that an enzymatic reaction can be seen in two steps: The formation of a stereospecific complex between protein and substrate and the catalytic activation of a reaction within the complex (he stresses again that the reaction is oriented and specified by the structure of the complex). He next considers the energetic differences between covalent and non-covalent bonds and how the speed of a reaction is affected by activation energy. Since the activation energy of a covalent bond is high, the reaction will have a slower speed than that of a non-covalent bond (which occurs spontaneously and rapidly). The author points out that non-covalent interactions attain stability only through numerous interactions and when applied over short distances. To attain stable non-covalent interaction there is a need for complementary sites between two interacting molecules so as to permit several atoms of the one to enter into contact with several atoms of the other. In this complex, the molecule of substrate is strictly positioned by the multiple non-covalent interactions with the enzyme. Enzymatic catalysis is believed to result from the inductive and polarizing action of certain chemical groupings of the specific receptor. By virtue of an enzyme's capacity to form stereospecific and non-covalent complexes with specific substrate, the substrate is correctly presented in the precise orientation that specifies the catalytic effect of the enzyme. Monod reminds us that this reaction comes at the expense of chemical potential energy.

=== Microscopic cybernetics ===
In chapter four ("Microscopic Cybernetics") the author starts out by repeating the characteristic of extreme specificity of enzymes and the extreme efficiency of the chemical machinery in living organisms. The large-scale coordination among cells provided by the nervous and endocrine system is brought to the readers’ attention. The rest of the chapter is a discussion of the principles that cell metabolism works by.

Monod first brings up allosteric enzymes, which are capable of recognizing compounds other than a substrate whose association with the enzyme protein has a modifying effect of heightening or inhibiting the enzyme activity with respect to the substrate. Monod lists and defines four regulatory patterns. The first is feedback inhibition. Feedback activation is when the enzyme is activated by a product of degradation of the terminal metabolite. Parallel activation takes place when the first enzyme of a metabolic sequence is activated by a metabolite synthesized by an independent parallel sequence. Activation through a precursor is defined as when an enzyme is activated by a precursor of its substrate and a particularly frequent case of this is activation of the enzyme by the substrate itself. Allosteric enzymes are usually under the simultaneous control of several allosteric effectors.

Next Monod makes reference to his own research and talks about the S-shaped non-linear curve that is characteristic of allosteric enzymes when activity is plotted against concentration of an effector (including the substrate). Allosteric interactions are mediated by discrete shifts in the proteins structure and this allows certain proteins to assume different conformational states. Cooperative and antagonistic interactions of ligands are indirect: ligands interact with the protein not with other ligands. Allosteric proteins are oligomeric (made up of identical protomer subunits) and each protomer has a receptor for each of the ligands. As a consequence of protomer assembly, each subunit is constrained by its neighbor. Upon dissociation each protomer can assume a relaxed state and this concerted response of each protomer accounts for the nonlinearity of enzyme activity: a ligand molecule that stabilizes the relaxed state of one of the monomers prevents the others from returning to the associated state.

These simple molecular mechanisms account for the integrative properties of allosteric enzymes. Monod again references his own work as he talks about the lactose system (consisting of three proteins) in Escherichia coli. He explains that galactoside permease (one of the proteins in the lactose system) enables the galactoside sugars to penetrate and accumulate within the cell. When E. coli are grown in a medium with no galactosides, the three proteins are synthesized very slowly (about one molecule every five generations). About two minutes after adding a galactoside inducer, the rate of synthesis of the three proteins increases a thousandfold. Monod explains that the rate of mRNA synthesis from the lactose operon determines the rate of the proteins synthesis. He lists the components of the regulatory system as i, the regulator gene that directs constant synthesis of the repressor protein (R), o, the operator segment of DNA that the repressor specifically recognizes and forms a stable complex with, and p, the DNA promoter where RNA polymerase binds. Synthesis of mRNA is blocked when the repressor is bound to the operator. When the repressor is in the free state it is able to recognize and bind beta galactosides thus dissociating the operator repressor complex and permitting synthesis of the mRNA and protein.

Monod spends some time stressing that there need be no chemical relationship between a substrate and an allosteric ligand and it is this "gratuity" that has allowed molecular evolution to make a huge network of interconnections and make each organism an autonomous functional unit. In the last part of the chapter Monod criticizes "holists" who challenge the value to analytically complex systems such as living organisms and that complex systems cannot be reduced to the sum of their parts. Monod first gives an example of dissecting a computer and then points out how teleonomic performances can be seen on a molecular level. He also states that the complexity of the cybernetic network in living beings is far too complex to study by the overall behavior of whole organisms.

=== Molecular ontogeny ===
At the start of chapter five, "Molecular Ontogenesis," Monod states he will show that the process of spontaneous autonomous morphogenesis depends upon "the stereospecific recognition properties of proteins; that it is primarily a microscopic process before manifesting itself in macroscopic structures. Finally, it is the primary structure of proteins that we shall consult for the 'secret' to those cognitive properties thanks to which, like Maxwell's demons, they animate and build living systems" (Monod 81). Monod mentions oligomeric globular proteins again and how they appear in aggregates containing geometrically equivalent protomer subunits associated into a non-covalent steric complex. With mild treatment, protomers are separated and the oligomer protein loses function but, if the initial "normal" conditions are restored, the subunits will usually reassemble spontaneously. This spontaneity is due to the fact that the chemical potential needed to form the oligomer is present in the solution of monomers and because the bonds formed are non-covalent.

Monod continues to mention the stereospecific, spontaneous assembly of ribosomes and T4 bacteriophage from their protein constituents in vitro. Monod points out that the overall scheme/architectural plan of the multi-molecular complex is contained in the structure of its constituent parts and it is, therefore, able to spontaneously self-assemble. Next, Monod reviews the primary and tertiary structure of proteins. In reviewing the tertiary structure, what he calls the native shape, he talks about the non-covalent interactions that bind the amino acids and the folding that determines the molecules three-dimensional shape including the stereospecific binding site.

Monod then writes that a primary structure exists in a single (or a small number of related states, as is the case with allosteric proteins) precisely defined conformational native state under normal physiological conditions. Prior to folding there is no biological activity. The sequence of the amino acid residues and the initial conditions determine the protein folding and, therefore, dictate the function. Monod splits organism development into four broad stages: First the folding of the polypeptide sequence into globular proteins, then the association between proteins into organelles, thirdly the interactions between cells that make up tissue and organs, and lastly "coordination and differentiation of chemical activities via allosteric-type interactions" (Monod 95). Each stage is more highly ordered and results from spontaneous interactions between products of the previous stage and the initial source is the genetic information represented by the polypeptide sequences.

Monod then spends some time developing the fact that the preceding sequence of amino acids has no bearing on what the next amino acid will be. He says this "random" message seems to be composed haphazardly from a random origin and he ends the chapter poetically: "Randomness caught on the wing, preserved, reproduced by the machinery of invariance and thus converted into order, rule, and necessity. A totally blind process can by definition lead to anything; it can even lead to vision itself" (Monod 98).

=== Invariance and perturbation ===
Chapter six is entitled "Invariance and Perturbations”. The similarity throughout all organisms of chemical machinery in both structure and function is set out. In regards to structure, all living beings are made up of proteins and nucleic acids and these are the same residues (twenty amino acids and four nucleotides). Similar functions are carried out by the same sequence of reactions that appear in all organisms for essential chemical operations (some variations exist that consist of new utilizations of universal metabolic sequences). On page 104 Monod states "The fundamental biological invariant is DNA. That is why Mendel's definition of the gene as the unvarying bearer of hereditary traits, its chemical identification by Avery (confirmed by Hershey), and the elucidation by Watson and Crick of the structural basis of its replicative invariance, without any doubt constitute the most important discoveries ever made in biology." He adds that the full significance of the theory of natural selection was established by these discoveries. There is a brief review of DNA whose structure is a helix with translational and rotational symmetry and if artificially separated the complementary strands will spontaneously reform. A very brief review of DNA synthesis by DNA polymerase is given. The sequence of nucleotides in DNA defines the sequence of amino acids which in turn defines the folding of proteins which in turn defines an organism; "One must regard the total organism as the ultimate epigenetic expression of the genetic message itself" (Monod, 109). The author makes the point that translation is irreversible and never takes place from protein to DNA. In the last part of the chapter the author brings up the important subject of mutations. Various mutations such as substitutions, deletions, and inversions are listed. The accidental random chance of these mutations and that these unpredictable mutations alone that are the source of evolution is pointed out and exemplified. The "error" in the genetic message will be replicated with a high degree of fidelity. In the words of Monod "the same source of fortuitous perturbations, of ‘noise’...is the progenitor of evolution in the biosphere and accounts for its unrestricted liberty of creation, thanks to the replicative structure of DNA: that registry of chance, that tone-deaf conservatory where the noise is preserved along with the music" (Monod, 117).

=== Evolution ===
That mutations are unpredictable, faithfully replicated, and that natural selection operates only upon the products of chance is repeated at the start of chapter seven entitled "Evolution". Monod states that the decisive factor in natural selection is not the "struggle for life" but is the differential rate of reproduction and the only mutations "acceptable" to an organism are those that "do not lessen the coherence of the teleonomic apparatus, but rather, further strengthen it in its already assumed orientation" (Monod, 119). Monod explains that the teleonomic performance is judged through natural selection and this system retains only a very small fraction of mutations that will perfect and enrich the teleonomic apparatus. Monod gives the example of antibody development to show how chance combinations can give a well defined solution. He states that the source of information for the antibodies associative structure is not the antigen itself but is instead the result of many random recombinations of part of the antibody gene. The antibody that is able to bind to the antigen is multiplied. This remarkable example shows chance as the basis for one of the most precise adaptation phenomena. Monod makes the point that selection of a mutation is due to the environmental surroundings of the organism and the teleonomic performances. He then gives some examples to show the interconnection of specific performances/behaviors and anatomical adaptations. The author spends the rest of the chapter discussing linguistic and physical human evolutionary development. Language is an utterly different from the various auditory, tactile, and visual forms of communication in that it allows the communication of an original personal association to another individual. Monod hypothesizes that language was not merely the product but one of the driving forces for the evolution of our central nervous system. He believes that rudimentary symbolic communication appeared early on and created a new selective pressure that favored development of linguistic ability and hence the brain. He then talks about the evolution of our ancestors including the development of upright posture which allowed them to become hunters. Monod lastly points out the evidence to suggest the development of the cognitive function of language in children depends upon postnatal growth of the cortex.

=== The boundary ===
In chapter eight, "The Frontiers," Monod captures the sense of wonderment one feels when considering the extraordinary diversity and complexity of organisms that have been brought about through billions of years of evolution. He says, "The miracle stands 'explained'; it does not strike us as any less miraculous." (Monod, 138). Three stages that led to the emergence of the first organism are proposed. First, there must have been the formation of nucleotides and amino acids from simple carbon compounds and non-biological catalysts. Next, the first macromolecules capable of replication were formed, probably through spontaneous base pairing. And lastly, the evolution of a teleonomic apparatus around the "replicative structures" would lead to the primitive cell.

Monod next turns his attention to the central nervous system. He lists the prime functions of the brain in mammals as control and coordination of neuromuscular activity, to set into action innate programs of action in response to stimuli, to integrate sensory inputs, to register, group, and associate significant events, and to represent and simulate. Monod makes the point that behavior cannot be strictly separated as learned or innate since elements are acquired through experience according to an innate program and "the program's structure initiates and guides early learning, which will follow a certain pre-established pattern defined by the species' genetic patrimony" (Monod, 153).

Monod now concentrates on what he views as one of the unique properties of higher-level organisms, namely that of simulating experience subjectively so as to anticipate results and prepare action. Monod describes as "the frontier" the work that is to be done that will enable us to understand how this instrument of intuitive preconception works. He believes this understanding will enable mankind to eliminate the dualism of differentiating between the brain and the mind. He ends the chapter stating "To give up the illusion that sees in it an immaterial "substance" is not to deny the existence of the soul, but on the contrary to begin to recognize the complexity, the richness, the unfathomable profundity of the genetic and cultural heritage and of the personal experience, conscious or otherwise, which together constitute this being of ours” (Monod, 159).

=== The Kingdom and darkness ===
The last chapter in the book is “The Kingdom and the Darkness”. Once man extended his domain over the subhuman sphere and dominated his environment the main threat became other men and tribal warfare came to be an important evolutionary selection factor and this would favor group cohesion. Cultural evolution affected physical evolution; “it is behavior that orients selective pressure” (Monod, 162). The author then says that due to the accelerating pace of cultural evolution, it no longer affects the genome and that selection does not favor the genetic survival of the fittest through a more numerous progeny. He brings up statistics that show a negative correlation between intelligence and the average number of children per couple and a positive correlation of intelligence between spouses which concentrates them among a shrinking elite. He also points to scientific and ethical advances that have allowed “genetic cripples” to live and reproduce (the author regards this as suspending natural selection). Monod says this suspension of natural selection is a peril to the species but that it will take quite a while for any serious effects and that there are more urgent dangers in modern society. He advances the idea “that nature is objective, that the systematic confronting of logic and experience is the sole source of true knowledge” (Monod, 165). He talks briefly about how ideas are selected based on the performance value. The author believes that we contain an inborn genetic need to search out the meaning of existence and that is responsible for the creation of myths, religion, and philosophy. He implies that this genetic component accounts for religion being the base of social structure and the reoccurrence of the same essential form in myths, religion, and philosophy. He admits that the idea of objective knowledge as the only source of truth may seem austere and unattractive in that it does not provide an explanation that will calm the anxiety of man; “It wrote an end to the ancient animist covenant between man and nature, leaving nothing in place of that precious bond but an anxious quest in a frozen universe of solitude” (Monod, 170). The author points to what he sees as the acceptance of objective science in practice but not in spirit. He says that the important message of science is that in the defining of a new source of truth which demands revision of ethical premises and a total break with the animist tradition. Our values are rooted in animism and are at odds with objective knowledge and truth. This jarring and isolating revelation places value judgments within the hands of man himself. Monod believes that objective truth and the theory of values cannot be separated “because the very definition of “true” knowledge reposes in the final analysis upon an ethical postulate” (Monod, 173). It is at this point that the author's argument turns upon itself by admitting that making objectivity the condition for true knowledge, which helps to separate value judgments from true knowledge and define science, is itself an axiomatic ethical choice. By asserting the principle of objectivity, which is accepted in modern science, one is choosing to adhere to what Monod calls the ethic of knowledge. (Monod, 180). The book ends with this thought: "The ancient covenant is in pieces; man knows at last that he is alone in the universe's unfeeling immensity, out of which he emerged only by chance. His destiny is nowhere spelled out, nor is his duty. The kingdom above or the darkness below; it is for him to choose” (Monod, 180).

== Awards ==
The first U.S. edition (New York: Vintage, 1971), translated by Austryn Wainhouse, won the National Book Award in category Translation.

== Criticism ==
Jeffery Wicken, in Zygon: Journal of Religion & Science, described the book as a "manifesto of materialist biology in the most reductivist sense".

== Bibliography ==
- Chance and Necessity: An Essay on the Natural Philosophy of Modern Biology by Jacques Monod, New York, Alfred A. Knopf, 1971, ISBN 0-394-46615-2
