= Dialogue Between a Priest and a Dying Man =

Book written by the Marquis de Sade

Dialogue Between a Priest and a Dying Man (original French: Dialogue entre un prêtre et un moribond) is a dialogue written by the Marquis de Sade while incarcerated at the Château de Vincennes in 1782. It is one of the earliest known written works from de Sade to be dated with certainty, and was first published in 1926 together with an edition of Historiettes, Contes et Fabliaux (written originally in 1788). It was subsequently published in English in 1927 by Pascal Covici in a limited, hand-numbered edition of 650 copies.

== Plot ==
The work expresses the author's atheism by having a dying man (a libertine) tell a priest about what he views as the mistakes of a pious life.

According to John Phillips, Emeritus Professor of French Literature and Culture at London Metropolitan University:

Of all the direct expressions of atheism in Sade's work, the Dialogue... is probably the most incisive and, at the same time, the most artistically satisfying... The influence of Sade's Jesuit training in rhetorical debate is the mainspring of this brilliant dramatic essay, which, as the title suggests, is not so much theatre as philosophical dialogue. But what makes the work charming as well as persuasive is the impish humour that lies behind its characters and situation.

However, Steven Barbone, of San Diego State University notes that:

We can postulate one of two things: Sade was entirely pleased with this manuscript and saw no reason to make any changes to it or Sade completely gave up on the dialogue and had decided to abandon it. The reason for either of these hypotheses is that the manuscript itself contains almost no trace of Sade's editing. It is up to the reader to divine whether the "Dialogue between the Priest and a Dying Man" is Sade's position or not. Either way, it is worth reading even in the very unlikely event that it presents a position Sade would have repudiated. (This may be the case: near the beginning of October 1788, Sade himself made a catalogue of his works, and the "Dialogue" is omitted.)

== Publication history ==
Sade completed the notebook which contains the Dialogue on 12 July 1782, while imprisoned at Château de Vincennes. He took the manuscript with him when he was transferred to the Bastille in 1784.

Following the Storming of the Bastille on 14 July 1789, Sade's prison writings disappeared (Sade had been moved to Charenton on 4 July), the manuscript of the Dialogue among them. However, it survived in private collections and was sold on at auction a number of times during the nineteenth century. On 6 November 1920, it was bought by Maurice Heine at an auction at the Hôtel Drouot, Paris, and he oversaw its publication in France for the first time in 1926 in a limited edition of 500 copies for which he wrote an introduction.

The Dialogue has been republished in French several times since the 1950s, including in scholarly editions of the works of Sade edited by Gilbert Lely, Le Brun and Pauvert, and Michel Delon.

=== English translations ===
The first English translation was published in the United States by Pascal Covici in 1927, again in a limited edition of 650 numbered copies. The translator was Samuel Putnam. This edition was based on the first French edition and included a translation of Heine's introduction.

In 1929, Haldeman-Julius published the Putnam translation as Little Blue Book #1405, under the title Dialogue between a priest and a dying atheist. A version of this edition (with a short extract from Heine's introduction) was republished in 1997 by Chaz Bufe's See Sharp Press.

Further original English translations have been produced by Leonard de Saint-Yves (1953), Paul Dinnage (1953, incomplete), Richard Seaver and Austryn Wainhouse (1965. For more on the Seaver/Wainhouse translations of de Sade, see Wyngaard (2013)), Paul J. Gillett (1966), Nicolas Walter (1982, reprinted 2001), Margaret Crosland (1991), David Coward (1992) and Steven Barbone (2000).

== Legacy ==
The dialogue inspired a similar scene in Luis Buñuel's film Nazarín (1959), wherein a dying woman wards off a priest while on her deathbed. Buñuel had previously adapted The 120 Days of Sodom into a scene in his earlier L'Age d'Or (1930) and would go on to feature the Marquis himself as a character in La Voie Lactée (1969).
