= Anti-Justine =

1798 graphic novel by Nicolas-Edme Rétif

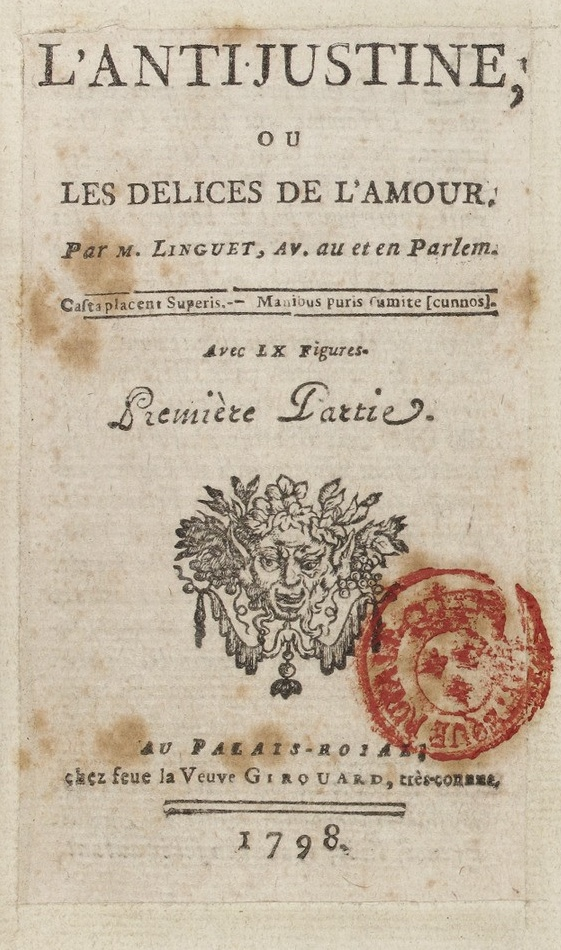
- Title page of the first edition
- Author: Nicolas-Edme Rétif (writing as Jean-Pierre Linguet)
- Publication date: 1798/1863

Anti-Justine is a French pornographic novel by Nicolas Restif de la Bretonne (1734–1806), published in 1798. It was written to oppose the political philosophy of the Marquis de Sade as expressed in Justine.

The original edition is incomplete. It was published pseudonymously and only four copies survive. In 1863, an anonymous publication was made by an unknown person. In 1864, Auguste Poulet-Malassis privately printed a superior edition.

== Texts ==
- Restif de La Bretonne. L'Anti-Justine at Project Gutenberg - French only.
