= Encyclopedia of Unusual Sex Practices =

1992 reference book on human sexual practices

- Author: Brenda Love
- Illustrator: Phoebe Gloeckner, Jakub Kalousek, Paul Mavrides, Julie Newdoll
- Language: English
- Subject: Sexuality, paraphilia
- Publisher: Barricade Books, Inc.
- Publication date: 1992
- Publication place: United States of America

The Encyclopedia of Unusual Sex Practices is a reference book by Brenda Love, first published in 1992, and republished many times.

== Description ==
The book describes a huge number of human sexual practices, many of which are either uncommon or regarded as taboo in many cultures. Many of the topics covered are related to paraphilia of various kinds. The book includes over 700 entries and 150 illustrations.

The Encyclopedia of Unusual Sex Practices is the only mainstream reference available on many of these topics. It has also been published in Spanish, Portuguese, Japanese, German and French.

== See also ==
- Human sexuality
- Human sexual behavior
- Paraphilia
- Sexual fetishism
- Cleopatra in popular culture – book credits her with inventing the vibrator
