= Justine Paris =

French coourtesan

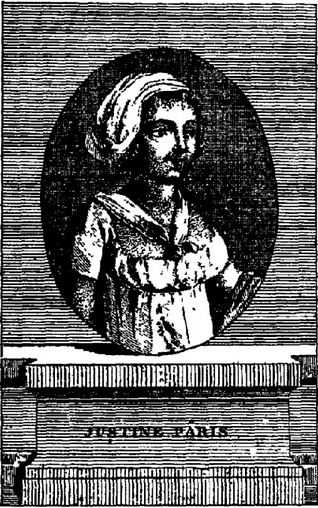
- Born: Bienfait; 1705
- Died: September 1773 (aged 67–68); Paris
- Cause of death: Syphilis
- Occupations: Courtesan and brothel madam

Justine Paris, real name Bienfait (1705 – September 1773), was a French courtesan and madam. She hosted several of the most famous brothels in mid-18th-century Paris and was one of the most known and successful of her trade. She and her brothel are portrayed in the memoirs of Casanova. She has been suggested to be the role model for the title character in Juliette by the Marquis de Sade.

== Biography ==
Reportedly, she was a successful and internationally known courtesan before she opened the first of several brothels. For twenty years from about 1730, she operated a well-known brothel at Rue de Bagneux, Faubourg Saint-Germain, described as the perhaps most exclusive in contemporary Paris. In 1750, following a riot, she opened a brothel at Hotel du Roule which acquired fame and which was later taken over by Madame Carlier.

Her brothel at Hotel du Roule was described by Casanova. It was located outside the city of Paris, near Chaillot, which meant that the clients could not go there by foot, which ensured that they mostly came from the upper class. While most brothels in mid 18th-century Paris had no more than three prostitutes working in the brothel at any one time, Justine Paris had 14 and she also employed a master of writing, dance and music to educate them. According to Casanova, she charged by the hour. As with other madams engaged in elite prostitution for clients from the nobility, the activity of Justine Paris was tolerated by the police as long as she functioned as a police agent and kept the police informed about the activity, business and life of their important clients and personnel.

The rental of rooms to couples, in which none of the parties were prostitutes, but where their relationship was not accepted, such as in the case of a married woman and her lover, also took place, a service which was to be well known to occur in the famous brothel she was later to found in companionship with Gourdan. She changed staff about every six months, and according to Casanova, she always had prostitutes of a large variety of hair color, length and other different attributes to be able to meet with different forms of preferences from clients. She financed kept mistresses, so called dames entretenues or courtesans, in between patrons; clients could buy a member of her staff free by paying her debts and have her kept as his professional mistress, where the mistress could continue as a professional kept mistress to other wealthy men.

In February 1752, Justine Paris was tried and incarcerated accused of having seduced a twelve-year-old boy from a noble family in a case that attracted attention. In 1773, she met her colleague Marguerite Gourdan at Bicêtre Hospital while undergoing a treatment for syphilis. Together, they founded what was to be the perhaps most famous of all brothels in 18th-century France, on the corner of rue des Deux Portes (now rue Dussoubs) and rue Saint-Sauveur. However, she died of syphilis in September of that year. Gourdan gave a funeral oration in her honour on 14 November 1773 at a gathering of Paris's elite prostitutes and madams organised by the Prince of Conti at his residence.
