= Juliette (novel) =

1797 novel written by the Marquis de Sade

Juliette, or Vice Amply Rewarded
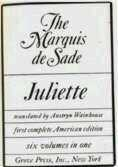
- Title page of 1968 translation by Austryn Wainhouse
- Author: The Marquis de Sade
- Original title: L'Histoire de Juliette, ou les Prospérités du vice
- Language: French
- Genre: Libertine, philosophical novel, erotic
- Publication date: 1797
- Publication place: France
- Media type: Print (Hardback & Paperback)
- Preceded by: La Nouvelle Justine
- Followed by: The Crimes of Love (1800)

Juliette, or Vice Amply Rewarded (French: L'Histoire de Juliette ou les Prospérités du vice) is a Libertine horror novel written by the Marquis de Sade and published 1797–1801, accompanying de Sade's 1797 version of his novel Justine. While Justine, Juliette's sister, was a virtuous woman who consequently encountered nothing but despair and abuse, Juliette is an amoral nymphomaniac murderer who is successful and happy. As many other of his works, Juliette follows a pattern of violently pornographic scenes followed by long treatises on a broad range of philosophical topics, including theology, morality, aesthetics, naturalism and also Sade's dark, fatalistic view of world metaphysics.

== Plot summary ==
The majority of the novel is a first-person narrative in which the amoral Juliette recounts to her moral sister Justine, among other people, the events of her life. Juliette is raised in a convent. However, at age thirteen she is invited to a luncheon by Madame Delbene, the Abbess of the convent, and her fellow pupil, Euphrosiné, someone she looked up to. She is then raped by the two. A month after, Euphrosine leaves the convent to “fling herself into libertinage”. Over the course of 3 years, she is groomed by Madame Delbene, who explains that morality, religion and other such concepts are meaningless. There are plenty of similar philosophical musings during the book, all attacking the ideas of God, morals, remorse, love, etc. the overall conclusion being that the only aim in life is "to enjoy oneself at no matter whose expense." Juliette takes this to the extreme and manages to murder her way through numerous people, including various family members and friends.

During Juliette's life from age 13 to about 30, the wanton anti-heroine engages in virtually every form of depravity and encounters a series of like-minded libertines. She befriends the ferocious Clairwil, whose main passion is the murder of boys and young men, as revenge for the general brutality of men toward women. She meets Saint Fond, a 50-year-old multi-millionaire who murders his father, commits incest with his daughter, tortures young girls to death on a daily basis, and even plots an ambitious scheme to provoke a famine that will wipe out half the population of France. She also meets Noirceuil, a libertine who’s particularly violent, sadistic and criminal and is a rabid Anti-theist who murders Saint Fond for his power. He is also revealed to have murdered Juliette’s father. She becomes acquainted with Minski, a gigantic ogre-like Muscovite who delights in raping and torturing young boys and girls to death before eating them. The novel also contains several scenes of "fetishism, exhibitionism, voyeurism, sexual masochism, sexual sadism, paedophilia, zoophilia, and necrophilia", as well as horrific sexual violence.

=== Real people in Juliette ===
During her tour of Europe, Juliette encounters a series of libertines, including several historical figures who are all portrayed as depraved. A long audience with Pope Pius VI is one of the more extensive scenes in Juliette. The heroine repeatedly addresses the Pope by his legal name, "Braschi". She also flaunts her learning with a verbal, yet highly detailed, catalogue of alleged immoralities committed by his papal predecessors. Their conversation ends (like nearly every scene in the narrative) with an orgy, in which Pope Pius is portrayed as a secret libertine. While discussing murder, Braschi notes that cruelty is essential to pleasure, remarking that "killing is not enough, one must kill in hideous style".

Soon after this, the male character Brisatesta narrates two scandalous encounters. The first is with "Princess Sophia, niece of the King of Prussia", who has just married "the Stadtholder" at the Hague. This is a presumed reference to Wilhelmina of Prussia, Princess of Orange, who married the last Dutch Stadtholder, William V of Orange, in 1767, and was still alive when Juliette was published thirty years later. The second encounter is with Catherine the Great, the Empress of Russia.

== Publication and reception ==
Both Justine and Juliette were published anonymously. Napoleon ordered the arrest of the author, and as a result de Sade was incarcerated without trial for the last thirteen years of his life.

The essay (Excursus II) "Juliette or Enlightenment and Morality" in Max Horkheimer and Theodor Adorno's Dialectic of Enlightenment (1947) analyses Juliette as the embodiment of the philosophy of enlightenment. They write: "she demonises Catholicism as the most-up-to-date mythology—and along with it, civilisation as a whole. Her comportment is enlightened and efficient as she goes about her work of sacrilege … She favours system and consequence."

Tatsuhiko Shibusawa's 1959 Japanese translation Akutoku no sakae (悪徳の栄え), resulted in a rare obscenity trial in Japan, where Shibusawa and his publisher were found guilty.

== See also ==
- Justine Paris

== Bibliography ==
- Juliette. Translated by Wainhouse, Austryn. 1968. OCLC 976556170.
