= Justine (de Sade novel) =

1791 novel by the Marquis de Sade

Justine, or The Misfortunes of Virtue
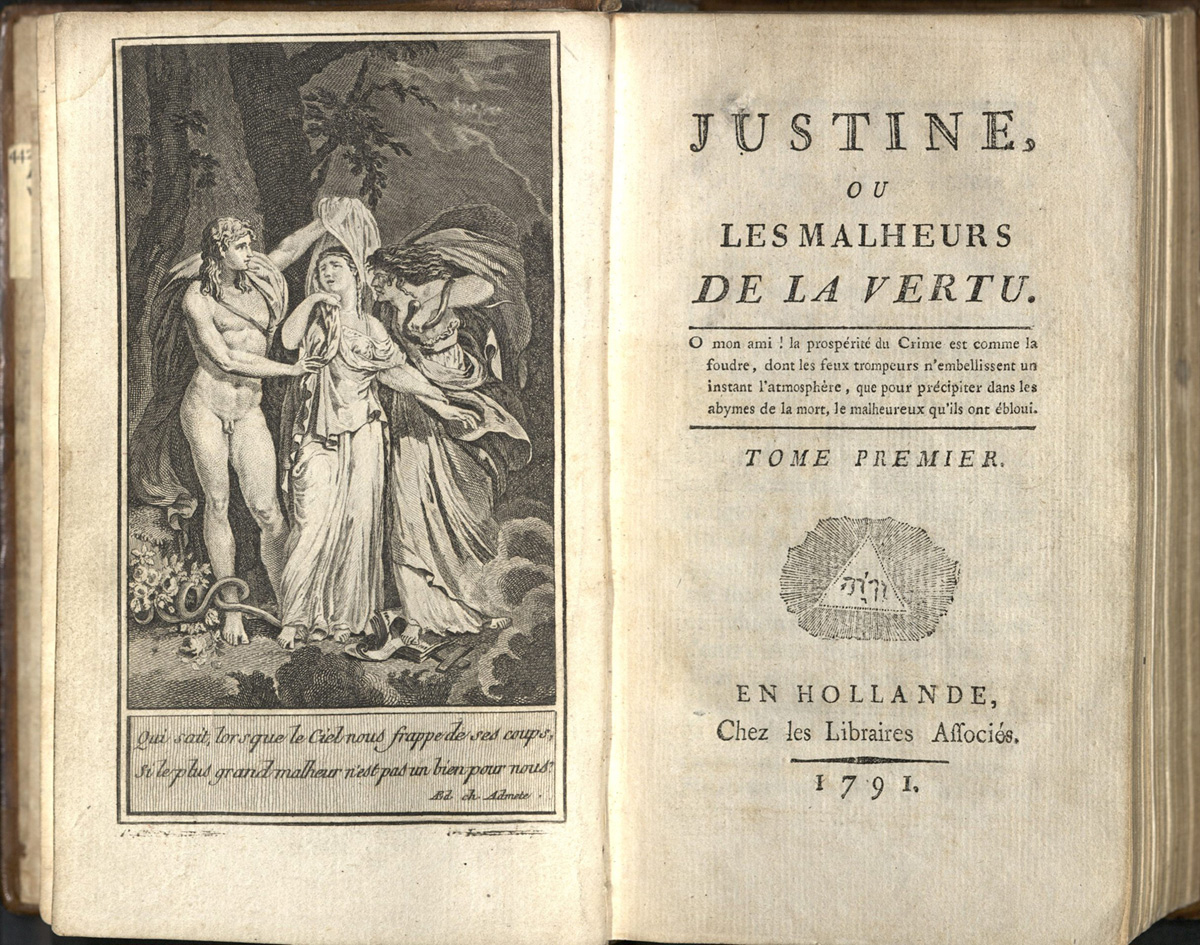
- Frontispiece by Philippe Chéry and title page of the first edition
- Author: The Marquis de Sade
- Original title: Les Infortunes de la Vertu
- Translator: Pieralessandro Casavini
- Language: French
- Genre: Libertine, erotic
- Publisher: J. V. Girouard
- Publication date: 1791
- Publication place: France
- Followed by: Juliette

Justine, or The Misfortunes of Virtue (French: Justine, ou Les Malheurs de la Vertu) is a 1791 novel by Donatien Alphonse François de Sade, better known as the Marquis de Sade. Justine is set just before the French Revolution in France and tells the story of a young girl who goes under the name of Thérèse. Her story is recounted to Madame de Lorsange while defending herself for her crimes, en route to punishment and death. She explains the series of misfortunes that led to her present situation.

== History of the work ==
Justine (original French title: Les infortunes de la vertu) was an early work by the Marquis de Sade, written in two weeks in 1787 while he was imprisoned in the Bastille. It is a novella (187 pages) with relatively little of the obscenity that characterised his later writing, as it was written in the classical style (which was fashionable at the time), with much verbose and metaphorical description.

A much extended and more graphic version, entitled Justine ou Les Malheurs de la vertu (1791) (English title: Justine, or The Misfortunes of the Virtue or simply Justine), was the first of Sade's books published.

A further extended version, La Nouvelle Justine ou Les Malheurs de la vertu (The New Justine), was published in the Netherlands in 1797. This final version, La Nouvelle Justine, departed from the first-person narrative of the previous two versions, and included around 100 engravings. It was accompanied by a continuation, Juliette, about Justine's sister. The two together formed 10 volumes of nearly 4,000 pages in total; publication was completed in 1801.

Napoleon Bonaparte ordered the arrest of the anonymous author of Justine and Juliette, and as a result Sade was incarcerated for the last 13 years of his life. The book's destruction was ordered by the Cour Royale de Paris on May 19, 1815.

== Modern publication ==
A censored English translation of Justine was issued in the US by the Risus Press in the early 1930s, and went through many reprints. The first unexpurgated English translation of Justine (by 'Pieralessandro Casavini', a pseudonym for Austryn Wainhouse) was published by the Olympia Press in 1953. Wainhouse later revised this translation for publication in the United States by Grove Press (1965). Another modern translated version still in print is the 1999 Wordsworth edition — a translation of the original version in which Justine calls herself Sophie and not Thérèse.

The final 1797 version La Nouvelle Justine has never been published in English translation, although it was published in French in the permissive conditions of the late 1960s, as part of two rival limited-editions of the definitive collected works of Sade: Jean-Jacques Pauvert's Œuvres complètes de Sade (1968, 30 volumes) and Cercle du Livre Precieux's Œuvres complètes du Marquis de Sade: editions definitive (1967, 16 volumes).

== Plot ==
Justine, a 12-year-old maiden, sets off to make her way in France. It follows her until age 26 in her quest for virtue. She is presented with sexual lessons, hidden under a virtuous mask. The unfortunate situations include the time when she seeks refuge and confession in a monastery, but is forced to become a sex slave to the monks, who subject her to countless orgies, rapes and similar rigours and the time when, helping a gentleman who is robbed in a field, he takes her back to his château with promises of a post caring for his wife, but she is then confined in a cave and subject to much the same punishment. These punishments are mostly the same throughout, even when she goes to a judge to beg for mercy in her case as an arsonist and then finds herself openly humiliated in court, unable to defend herself. These are described in true Sadean form. However, unlike some of his other works, the novel is not just a catalogue of sadism.

Justine (Thérèse or Sophie in the first version) and Juliette are the daughters of Monsieur de Bertole. Bertole is a widowed banker who falls in love with another man's lover. The man, Monsieur de Noirseuil, in the interest of revenge, pretends to be his friend, makes sure he becomes bankrupt and eventually poisons him, leaving the girls orphans. Juliette and Justine live in a nunnery, where the abbess corrupts Juliette (and attempts to corrupt Justine too). However, Justine is sweet and virtuous. When the abbess finds out about Bertole's death, she throws both girls out. Juliette's story is told in another book and Justine continues on in pursuit of virtue, beginning from becoming a maid in the house of the usurer Harpin, which is where her troubles begin anew.

In her search for work and shelter, Justine constantly falls into the hands of rogues who ravish and torture her and the people she makes friends with. Justine is falsely accused of theft by Harpin and sent to jail, expecting execution. She has to ally herself with Miss Dubois, a criminal who helps her to escape along with her band. To escape, Miss Dubois arranges a fire to break out in the prison, in which 21 people died. After escaping the band of Dubois, Justine wanders off and accidentally trespasses upon the lands of the Count of Bressac.

The story is told by "Thérèse" ("Sophie" in the first version) in an inn, to Madame de Lorsange. It is finally revealed that Madame de Lorsange is her long-lost sister. The irony is that her sister submitted to a brief period of vice and found herself a comfortable existence where she could exercise good, while Justine refused to make concessions for the greater good and was plunged further into vice than those who would go willingly.

The story ends with Madame de Lorsange relieving her from a life of vice and clearing her name. Soon afterward, Justine becomes introverted and morose and is finally struck by a bolt of lightning and killed instantly. Madame de Lorsange joins a religious order after Justine's death.

== Scholarship ==
Simone de Beauvoir wrote a notable essay on Sade, "Faut-il brûler Sade?" ("Should we burn Sade?"), published in 1955. She argues that, beyond the scandalous element, Sade uses Justine to reconcile individual pleasure with societal existence and to explore an ethical dimension to libertine philosophy.

One scholar commented:

The libertines derive as much satisfaction from defeating their opponents intellectually as they do from subduing and abusing them physically, while the victims themselves (and Justine offers the best example of this) rise admirably to the challenge with equally forceful and reasoned replies.

James Fowler writes that "her piety offers her the most intense pleasure she can experience in life" and describes her responses to the libertine Marquis de Bressac as "pious hedonism".

== Legacy ==
In 1798, the rival writer Rétif de la Bretonne published his Anti-Justine.

In Lars von Trier's 2011 film Melancholia, the main character, played by Kirsten Dunst, is named after de Sade's Justine.

A retelling in contemporary terms is The Turkish Bath, a 1969 novel published by Olympia Press, allegedly by Justine and Juliette Lemercier in an autobiographical format.

== Film, TV or theatrical adaptations ==
The story has been adapted for film several times, most notably in a 1969 international co-production directed by Jesús Franco and starring Jack Palance, Romina Power, and Klaus Kinski as the Marquis, titled Marquis de Sade: Justine. There has also been a graphic novel version by Guido Crepax. In 1972, French director Claude Pierson filmed a very faithful adaptation of Sade's work titled Justine de Sade, with French Alice Arno in the title role. In 1973, the Japanese director Tatsumi Kumashiro filmed an adaptation of Justine as part of Nikkatsu's Roman Porno series. The film was titled Woman Hell: Woods are Wet (女地獄 森は濡れた, Onna Jigoku: Mori wa Nureta). In 1977, a film version of the novel, titled Cruel Passion, was released.

Justine was also featured in the 2000 film Quills based on the life of the Marquis de Sade.

Julia Ducournau, director of the film Raw, said in an interview with Variety that she named the protagonist after Sade's Justine.

== See also ==
- Gothic novel
- Justine Paris
