= Brenda Love =

American psychologist, writer, international lecturer and sexologist

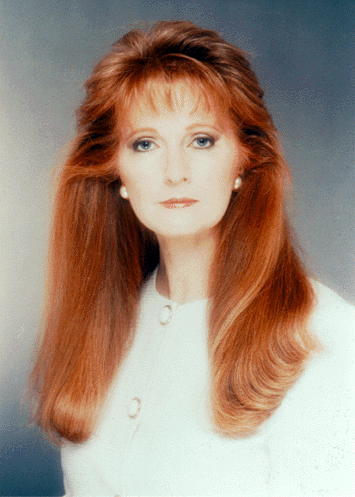
- Love in 1995
- Born: Brenda Billings; December 13, 1950 (age 75)
- Occupations: Author, editor, sociologist and sexologist

Brenda Love (born December 13, 1950) is an American psychologist, writer, international lecturer and sexologist. She is a leading authority on paraphilias, fetishes, sadomasochism and unusual sex practices. She has documented over 750 sex practices with 150 original illustrations in the Encyclopedia of Unusual Sex Practices and it remains the most comprehensive and valuable research available today for therapists, physicians, educators, and law enforcement agencies.

Love has promoted understanding and non-judgment of fetish behavior in public lectures and as a guest on numerous television and radio programs. During her career she served as a counselor on the National STD Hotline, The San Mateo Suicide and Crisis Center, The National AIDS Hotline, and the San Francisco Sex Switchboard.

Love received her doctorate in psychology from Hamilton University (1992) and a Bachelor of Arts from Trinity College & University (1990). She is also a biographee of Who's Who of American Women, and of Who's Who of Outstanding Writers of the 20th Century. She has been a member of the American Association of Sex Educators, Counselors, and Therapists, Society for the Scientific Study of Sexuality, the International Society for Prevention of Child Abuse and Neglect, Student Affiliate of the American Psychological Association, the Mystery Writers of America, and the California Writers Club.

== Publications ==
- Love, Brenda, (2024), "Prague Directory", Amazon (ISBN 979-8329236873)
- Love, Brenda, (2023), "Jewish Prague", Amazon (ISBN 979-8867204488)
- Love, Brenda, (2012), WWII Memoirs, Amazon (ISBN 979-8510326574)
- Love, Brenda Zejdl, (2012), Dita's Journey, 5 Camps 5 Years, Amazon (ISBN 979-8707324901).
- Love, Brenda, (1992), Encyclopedia of Unusual Sex Practices, Little Brown ISBN 0-349-11535-4. The book is available in English, Spanish, German, Portuguese, Japanese and French.
- Love, B, (2001) Contributing writer for The International Encyclopedia of Sexuality, (ISBN 0-8264-1274-2) by Francoeur, R. An updated one-volume version was published in 2004 under the title The Continuum complete international encyclopedia of sexuality (ISBN 0-8264-1488-5).
- Love, B, (1992), "500 Unusual Sex Practices" video, Institute for the Advanced Study of Human Sexuality, San Francisco
- Love, B, Bishop L, (2020), A Crazy Old Ladies' Guide to the World of Bridge, Amazon (ISBN 9781710583175).
- Love, B, Cook C; (1995), Encyclopedia of Unusual Sex Practices DVD, Harvest Moon Studios, Los Angeles, CA
- Love, B, (1991), "Gastronophilia", Not Naughty News;, Woodside, CA, Vol. 1, No. 2,
- Love, B, (1992), "Entomophilia", Not Naughty News;, Woodside, CA, Vol. 2, No. 1
- Love, B, (1993), "Pie Throwing", Not Naughty News;, Woodside, CA, Vol. 3, No. 1
- Love, B, (1994), "Hierophilia and Pecattiphilia", Passionate Living Magazine;, Woodside, California, Vol. 4, No. 2
