= Austryn Wainhouse =

American translator and writer

Austryn Wainhouse (6 February 1927 – 29 September 2014) was an American author, publisher and translator, primarily of French works and most notably of the Marquis de Sade. He sometimes used the pseudonym Pieralessandro Casavini.

== Life ==
Following his graduation from Harvard University, Wainhouse traveled around Europe before settling in Paris where he worked for Maurice Girodias at Olympia Press. His wife Mary, known as Muffy or Muffie, also worked for Girodias. They divorced in 1959.

In 1960, some time after Wainhouse had returned to the United States, Gay Talese described him as

.. a dis-enchanted Exeter-Harvard man who wrote a strong, esoteric novel, Hedyphagetica, and who, after several years in France, is now living in Martha's Vineyard building furniture according to the methods of the eighteenth century.

Wainhouse and his wife, Deborah Clayton Wainhouse, returned to the south of France in 2001, where he lived until his death in September 2014.

== Career ==
In the early 1950s, Wainhouse worked for Maurice Girodias at Olympia Press in Paris, and later was an editor of the short-lived literary magazine Merlin.

Wainhouse produced the first unexpurgated English translation of the Marquis de Sade's Justine for Olympia Press in 1953. In 1955 the controversial erotic French novel Histoire d'O (Story of O) by Pauline Reage (a pseudonym for Anne Desclos), won the prestigious Prix des Deux Magots award for unconventional books. Wainhouse was hired to provide a second translation. In order to thwart the censors and protect the author and translator, Girodias changed the title to The Wisdom of the Lash.

After his return to the United States, Wainhouse embarked on a translation of Sade's entire oeuvre for Grove Press, including Justine, The 120 Days of Sodom, and Letters from the Bastille. The translation was well-received, with one reviewer calling it "appropriately and agreeably prolix."

In 1970 Wainhouse was Writer-in-Residence at the Jonas Salk Institute, and in 1972 he won the National Book Award in category Translation for Jacques Monod's Chance and Necessity (NY: Vintage, 1971).

By 1983, he had established his own publishing firm The Marlboro Press in Marlboro, Vermont, which specialized in translations of works into English, such as Louis Calaferte's C'est la Guerre and Georges Hyvernaud's Skin and Bones. His wife Deborah Clayton Wainhouse was director of the press.

Wainhouse was friends for many years with British poet Christopher Logue, with whom he carried on a lively correspondence for decades.

== Bibliography ==
=== Original work ===
- Hedyphagetica, 1954 OCLC 64185389 in Paris
- On Translating Sade, 1966, Evergreen Review

=== Translations ===
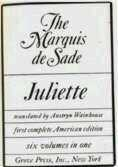
Title page of 1968 Juliette

- 1953: Marquis de Sade's Justine OCLC 6675617, reprinted in 1963 as #67 in Traveller's Companion series.
- 1955: Georges Bataille, Lascaux; or, the Birth of Art, the Prehistoric Paintings and Manet, co-translator James Emmons
- 1958: Simone de Beauvoir, The Long March
- 1968: Marquis de Sade, Juliette (1797)
- 1971: Jacques Monod, Chance and Necessity, New York: Vintage, 1971
- 1989: Georges Bataille, My Mother, Madame Edwarda, The Dead Man, with essays by Yukio Mishima and Ken Hollings, Marion Boyars Publishers.
- 1996: Aleksandra Kroh, Lucien's Story OCLC 34885928
- 2002: Pierre Klossowski, Roberte ce Soir and Revocation of the Edict of Nantes, with introduction by Michael Perkins, published by Dalkey Archive Press
