= Marquis de Sade =

French writer and nobleman (1740–1814)

Donatien Alphonse François de Sade
- Marquis de Sade
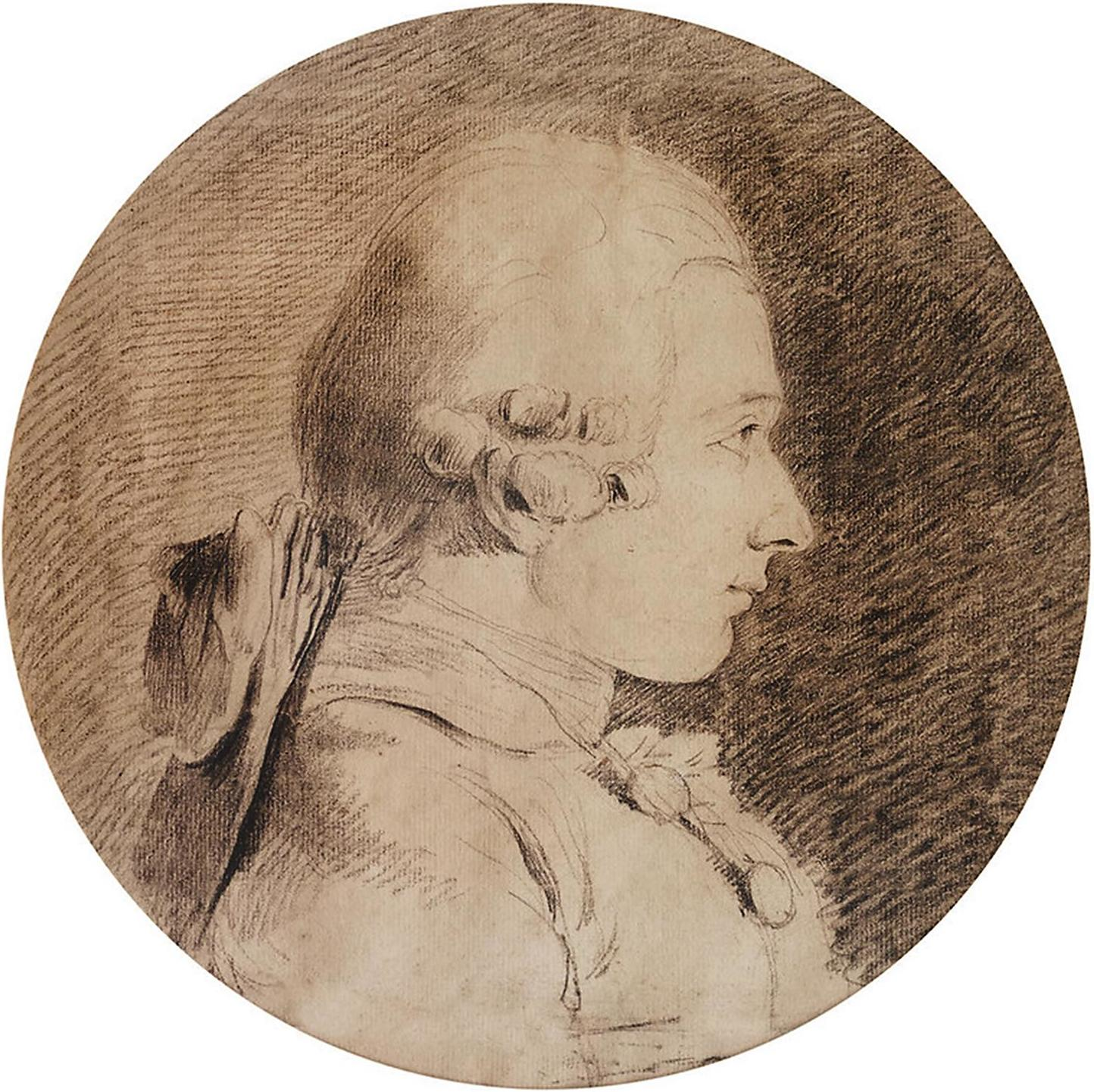
- Portrait of Donatien Alphonse François de Sade by Charles-Amédée-Philippe van Loo. The drawing dates to 1760, when Sade was 19 years old, and is the only known authentic portrait of him.

- Coat of arms
- Born: 2 June 1740; Paris, Kingdom of France
- Died: 2 December 1814 (aged 74); Charenton, Val-de-Marne, Kingdom of France
- Spouse: Renée-Pélagie Cordier de Launay (m. 1763; sep. 1790)
- Issue: Louis Marie de Sade (1767–1809); Donatien Claude Armand de Sade (1769–1847); Madeleine Laure de Sade (1771–1844)
- Father: Jean-Baptiste François Joseph, Comte de Sade
- Mother: Marie-Éléonore de Maillé de Carman
- Partner: Marie-Constance Quesnet (1790–1814; his death)

Philosophical work
- Era: Late 18th century
- Region: France
- Main interests: Atheism; libertinism; materialism; moral nihilism; pornography; sadism
- Notable works: The 120 Days of Sodom (1785); Justine (1791); Philosophy in the Bedroom (1795); Juliette (1799)

Signature
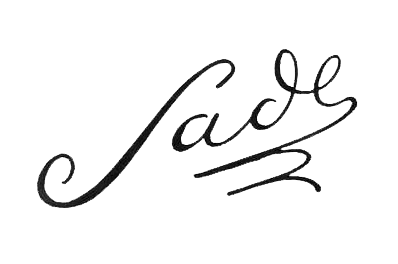

Donatien Alphonse François, Marquis de Sade (/sɑːd, sæd/ SA(H)D; French: [dɔnasjɛ̃ alfɔ̃s fʁɑ̃swa maʁki də sad]; 2 June 1740 – 2 December 1814) was a French writer, libertine, political activist, and nobleman best known for his libertine novels and imprisonment for sex crimes, blasphemy, and pornography. His works include novels, short stories, plays, dialogues, and political tracts. Some of these were published under his own name during his lifetime, but most appeared anonymously or posthumously.

Born into a noble family dating back to the 13th century, Sade served as an officer in the Seven Years' War before a series of sex scandals led to his detention in various prisons and insane asylums for most of his adult life. During his first extended imprisonment from 1777 to 1790, he wrote a series of novels and other works, some of which his wife smuggled out of prison. On his release during the French Revolution, he pursued a literary career and became politically active, first as a constitutional monarchist then as a radical republican. During the Reign of Terror, he was imprisoned for moderatism and narrowly escaped the guillotine. He was re-arrested in 1801 for his pornographic novels and was eventually incarcerated in the Charenton insane asylum, where he died in 1814.

His major works include The 120 Days of Sodom, Justine, Juliette and Philosophy in the Bedroom, which combine graphic descriptions of sex acts, rape, torture, murder, and child abuse with discourses on religion, politics, sexuality, and philosophy. The word sadism derives from his fictional characters who take pleasure in inflicting pain on others.

There is debate over the extent to which Sade's behavior was criminal and sadistic. Peter Marshall states that Sade's "known behaviour (which includes only the beating of a housemaid and an orgy with several prostitutes) departs greatly from the clinical picture of active sadism". Andrea Dworkin, however, argues that the issue is whether one believes Sade or the women who accused him of sexual assault.

Interest in his work increased in the 20th century, with various authors considering him a precursor to Friedrich Nietzsche, Sigmund Freud, surrealism, totalitarianism, and anarchism. Many prominent intellectuals, including Angela Carter, Simone de Beauvoir, and Roland Barthes, published studies of his work, and numerous biographies have also been produced. Cultural depictions of his life and work include the play Marat/Sade by Peter Weiss and the film Salò, or the 120 Days of Sodom by Pier Paolo Pasolini. Dworkin and Roger Shattuck have criticized the rehabilitation of Sade's reputation, arguing that it promotes violent pornography likely to cause harm to women, the young and "unformed minds".

== Life ==
=== Early life, education and marriage (1740–1763) ===
Sade was born on 2 June 1740, in the Hôtel de Condé, Paris, the only surviving child of Jean-Baptiste François Joseph, Comte de Sade, and Marie-Éléonore de Maillé de Carman. The Sade family was of the provincial nobility dating to the 13th century. Sade's mother was from a junior branch of the house of Bourbon-Condé and therefore Sade was related to the King of France by blood.

Sade's father was a captain of dragoons who was entrusted with diplomatic missions to the Russian Empire, Britain and the Elector of Cologne. His mother was lady-in-waiting to the Princess of Condé and, for his first four years, Sade lived in the Hôtel de Condé. The infant Sade was spoilt, haughty, and prone to violent rages. In 1744, he was sent to live with his grandmother in Avignon, probably because he had fought with his playmate, Louis Joseph, Prince of Condé, who was four years his senior.

The following year, Sade was placed in the care of his paternal uncle, the Abbé de Sade, a priest and libertine who lived in the château de Saumane in the Vaucluse region. The Abbé d'Amblet was appointed as Sade's tutor and the young marquis grew to respect him greatly. Meanwhile, the Count de Sade had lost favor with the king and had been recalled from his post in Germany. His career was now in ruins and his wife eventually left him to live in a Carmelite convent in Paris.

In the autumn of 1750, ten-year-old Sade was sent to the Jesuit college Louis-le-Grand in Paris, where he was taught Latin, Greek and rhetoric, and also participated in the school's theatrical productions. Sade's father was now heavily in debt and could not afford to enroll his son as a residential student, so Sade probably lived in private accommodation with Amblet. Residential students were discouraged from mixing with external students, and this might have isolated Sade from his aristocratic peers. Biographers and historians are divided on whether or not Sade experienced caning (or other forms of corporal punishment), sexual abuse or sodomy while at school, and whether or not this influenced his sexual development.

Sade spent his summer holidays with Madame de Raimond, one of his father's former lovers, at the château de Longeville in the Champagne region. There, he met Madame de Saint-Germain, for whom he would hold a life-long affection. Both women became mother-figures for Sade.

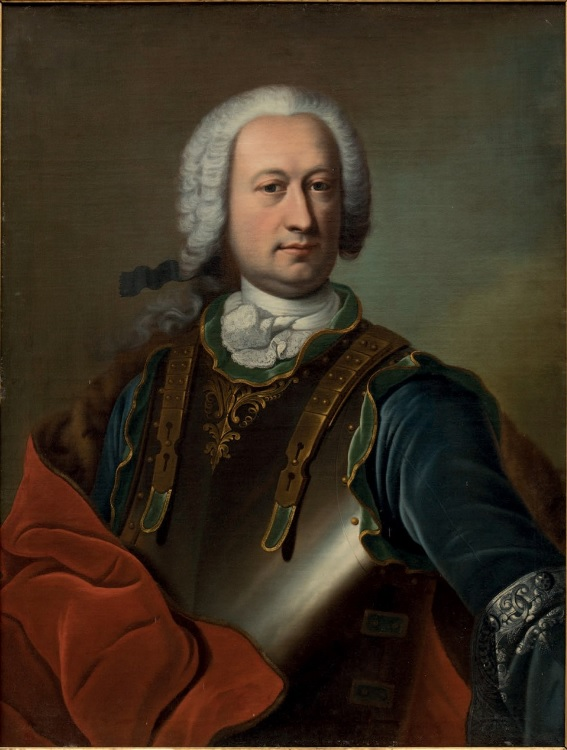
Sade's father, Jean-Baptiste François Joseph de Sade

In 1754, Sade was sent to the Chevaux-légers military academy. After twenty months of training, on 14 December 1755, aged 15, Sade was commissioned as a sub-lieutenant in the King's Foot Guard. He soon went to battle at the onset of the Seven Years' War. After thirteen months as a sub-lieutenant, he was commissioned to the rank of cornet in the Brigade de Saint-André of the Comte de Provence's Carbine Regiment on 14 January 1757, and again promoted to the rank of captain in the Burgundian Cavalry on 21 April 1759. Despite this, Sade generally refused to ingratiate himself with his superiors, and "disdained making friends with his peers". He frequently infuriated his father with his gambling and womanizing.

By 1761, Sade had gained a reputation as a good soldier, but a gambler, spendthrift and libertine, all of which damaged any prospects of further promotion. In February 1763, the Treaty of Paris ended the Seven Years' War, and Sade was discharged. Back in Paris, he lived a life of pleasure, while his ill and seriously indebted father contemplated retiring to a monastery to avoid "having to welcome my son, with whom I am unhappy".

Sade's father was also negotiating with the Montreuil family for his son to marry their eldest daughter, Renée-Pélagie. Although the Montreuils were of bourgeois origin, and had only been ennobled in the 17th century, they were wealthy and had influential contacts, both at court and in legal circles. The count considered his son a financial burden with a poor character: "As for me, what makes up my mind is that I will be rid of the boy, who has not one good quality and all the bad ones".

Meanwhile, Sade had fallen in love with a nobleman's daughter named Laure de Lauris, but was abruptly rejected after two months of courtship. He was enraged, and threatened to blackmail Lauris by blaming his venereal disease on her to the next young man she courted. Sade, who proclaimed that he would "only marry for love", resisted the arranged marriage with the "plain and charmless" Renée-Pélagie, and did not attend court when, on 1 May 1763, the king and members of the royal family endorsed the marriage contract. Sade finally relented, and the two families signed the contract on 15 May. The wedding took place two days later.

Sade and Renée-Pélagie moved into rooms provided by her parents in the Hôtel de Montreuil in Paris. Sade was initially pleased with his new, strictly Catholic bride, writing to his uncle, "I don't know how to praise her enough". Two years later, however, he told the Abbé that she was "too cold and too devout". She gave birth to two sons and a daughter, and later became an accomplice to his alleged crimes with adolescents.

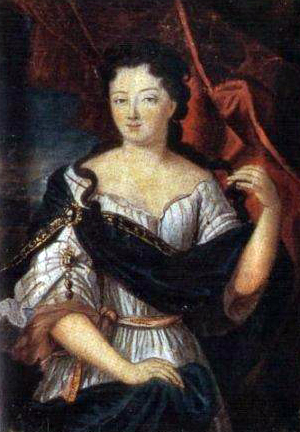
Sade's mother, Marie-Éléonore de Maillé de Carman

=== Scandals and imprisonment (1763–1790) ===
==== Testard affair and aftermath ====
Four months after his wedding, Sade was accused of blasphemy and incitement to sacrilege, which were capital offenses. He had rented a property in Paris which he used for sexual encounters. On 18 October 1763, Sade hired a prostitute named Jeanne Testard. Testard stated to the police that Sade had locked her in a bedroom before asking whether she believed in God. When she said that she did, Sade said there was no God and shouted obscenities concerning Jesus and the Virgin Mary. Sade then masturbated with a chalice and crucifix while shouting obscenities and blasphemies. He asked her to beat him with a cane and an iron scourge which had been heated by fire, but she refused. Sade then threatened her with pistols and a sword, telling her he would kill her if she did not trample on a crucifix and exclaim obscene blasphemies. She reluctantly complied. She spent the night with Sade, who read her irreligious poetry. He asked her for sodomy (another capital offense) but she refused. The following morning, Testard reported Sade to the authorities. On 29 October, following a police investigation, Sade was arrested on the personal orders of the king and jailed in Vincennes prison. Sade wrote several contrite letters to the authorities in which he expressed remorse and asked to see a priest. After Sade's father begged Louis XV for clemency, the king ordered Sade's release on 13 November.

On his release, Sade was exiled to the Montreuil estate at Échauffour, Normandy. In September 1764, the king revoked Sade's exile and the marquis returned to Paris where he took up a series of mistresses. In the summer of 1765 he took his then mistress, Mademoiselle Beauvoison, to his favourite castle at La Coste, Provence, where he passed her off as his wife, greatly offending Madame de Montreuil. The following year, he undertook renovations of La Coste, including building a theater for public performances.

In January 1767, Sade's father died. That summer, Sade went to La Coste where the local dignitaries and vassals formally swore homage to their new lord; a revival of a feudal custom which his father had avoided. On 27 August, his first son, Louis-Marie, was born.

==== Arcueil affair and aftermath ====
On 3 April 1768, Easter Sunday, Sade approached a 36-year-old widow named Rose Keller who was begging at the Place des Victoires in Paris. Keller stated that Sade offered her employment as a housekeeper. He took her in his carriage to his country residence in Arcueil, where he locked her in a room and threatened to kill her if she did not undress. He then tied her down on a bed and whipped her with a cane or a cat-o'-nine-tails. She stated he also cut her with a penknife and poured hot wax on her wounds. He brandished a knife and threatened to kill her if she did not stop screaming. He later gave her food and locked her in an upstairs room. She managed to escape out a window and sought help. She went to the authorities that evening and lodged a complaint. The local magistrate began an investigation the following day and news of the affair reached Madame de Montreuil on 7 April. She immediately sent representatives to Arcueil who paid Keller to withdraw her complaint. On 8 April, the king issued a lettre de cachet (a royal warrant for arrest and detention without trial) and Sade was imprisoned at the Château de Saumur and later the Pierre-Encize prison. On 15 April, the criminal chamber of the parlement de Paris took up the case and soon issued an arrest warrant for Sade. On 3 June, the king issued a pardon for the marquis, probably on the petition of the Montreuil family. The parlement interrogated Sade on 10 June and he stated that Keller was a prostitute who willingly supplied her services. He denied tying her down, cutting her with a knife or burning her with hot wax and stated that Keller did not complain about the flagellation at the time. The parlement accepted the king's pardon and ordered Sade to pay 100 livres in alms for prisoners. Sade was returned to Pierre-Encize prison under the lettre de cachet. On 16 November, the king ordered his release on the condition that he stay at La Coste under supervision.

The Arcueil affair was widely publicized, causing the Sade and Montreuil families great concern for their reputation. In June 1769, Renée-Pélagie gave birth to a second son, Donatien-Claude-Armand, and the Montreuils hoped this would help domesticate Sade. In July 1770, Sade returned to his Burgundy regiment where he encountered some hostility. In March 1771, however, he was granted a commission as Master of Cavalry which amounted to an official rehabilitation. Soon after, a daughter, Madeleine-Laure, was born. Sade, heavily in debt, was forced to sell his commission but this did not save him from a short spell in debtors' prison.

In November 1771, Renée-Pélagie's 19-year-old sister, Anne-Prospère, visited the Sades at La Coste. Sade developed "a fatal passion" for his sister-in-law and it is possible that they began a sexual relationship. The following year, he devoted himself to theatrical productions at La Coste and his Mazan property. He incurred large costs hiring professional actors and building elaborate sets.

==== Marseilles affair and aftermath ====
In June 1772, Sade and his manservant, Latour, traveled to Marseilles on the pretext of obtaining a loan. On June 27, they engaged in an elaborately staged orgy with four prostitutes. The orgy included sexual intercourse, flagellation, and, according to some witnesses, both active and passive anal sex involving Sade, Latour and one of the prostitutes. Sade offered the prostitutes aniseed-flavored pastilles laced with Spanish fly. One of the prostitutes, Marianne Laverne, became ill after eating the pastilles. That evening, Sade had sex with another prostitute, Marguerite Coste, who became critically ill after eating the pastilles. Coste filed a complaint with the police and, after an investigation, a warrant was issued for the arrest of Sade on charges of sodomy and poisoning.

Sade went into hiding, and his wife paid Laverne and Coste to withdraw their complaints. The Marseilles court, however, continued the prosecution, sentencing Sade and Latour to death in absentia on 2 September. The sentence was confirmed by the Cours des Comptes de Provence in Aix on 11 September, and Sade and Latour were burnt in effigy the following day. Sade was now in Italy with Anne-Prospère, a liaison which turned Madame de Montreuil into his implacable enemy. He wrote to his mother-in-law from Italy, disclosing his location, and she used her influence to secure his arrest and imprisonment in the Fortress of Miolans, then part of the Kingdom of Sardinia. He escaped from the fortress on 30 April 1773 and returned to France.

Sade narrowly avoided arrest in January 1774 when he was warned of an imminent police raid on his home in La Coste which had been arranged by Madame de Montreuil. Following the death of Louis XV in May, Madame de Montreuil successfully petitioned for a new lettre de cachet for Sade's arrest in the name of King Louis XVI. Meanwhile, Renée-Pélagie requested an appeal of her husband's death sentence.

==== La Coste affair and aftermath ====
In September 1774, Sade and his wife hired seven new servants for their La Coste property, including a male secretary and five females, all around 15 years old. That winter (1774–75), Sade, with the tacit consent of his wife, engaged in a series of orgies with his servants. Although the details are unknown, it is probable that the orgies included sexual intercourse and flagellation. In January 1775, the families of the girls filed charges of kidnapping and seduction, and a criminal investigation commenced in Lyon. Sade's wife arranged for three of the girls to be sent to convents and one to the Abbé Sade until their wounds healed. One of the girls remained at La Coste and died of an illness a few months later. In June, Nanon Sablonnière, one of the servants involved in the La Coste orgies, quarreled with the Sades and left, finding refuge in a convent. Fearing that Nanon might provide damaging testimony, Madame de Montreuil falsely accused her of theft and successfully petitioned for a lettre de cachet. Nanon was arrested and imprisoned at Arles where she remained for over two years. Sade, fearing arrest, left for Italy in July, and did not return for a year.

==== Treillet affair and imprisonment ====
In June 1776, Sade was back at La Coste writing a travel book, Voyage d'Italie. That summer, he hired three young women as servants, including Catherine Treillet, age 22. In December, he recruited four more servants. Three of them left after one night, claiming that Sade had offered them money for sex. They informed Treillet's father and, in January, he went to La Coste to retrieve his daughter. He fired a pistol at Sade from point-blank range, but it misfired. After a second attempt to shoot him, Treillet's father left and filed a complaint of kidnapping and seduction against Sade.

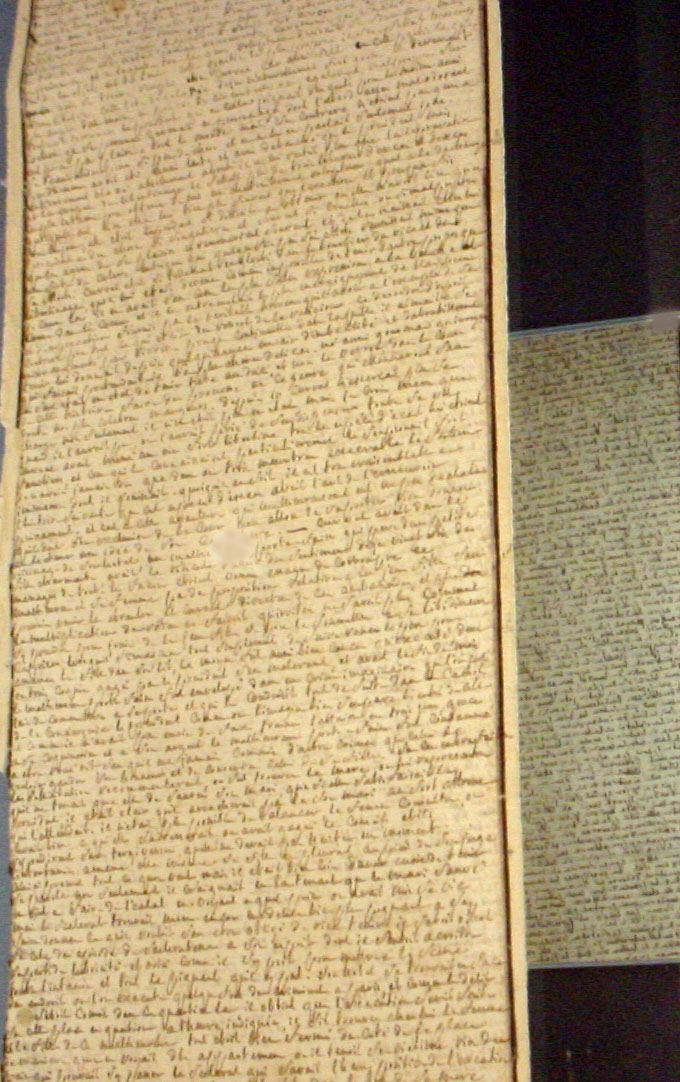
Detail of Les 120 Journées de Sodome manuscript

Madame de Montreuil then wrote to Sade telling him that his mother was critically ill in Paris. Sade and his wife arrived on 8 February 1777 only to find that his mother had been dead three weeks. On 13 February, he was arrested under the existing lettre de cachet and imprisoned in the Vincennes fortress.

With Sade now in custody, the parlement de Provence in Aix agreed to hear his appeal against his conviction for sodomy and poisoning. On 30 June 1778, the court overturned his conviction on poisoning and ordered a retrial on charges of debauchery and pederasty. Madame de Montreuil, wishing to avoid the disgrace of a criminal conviction in the family, sent a representative to Marseilles to bribe the prostitutes and other prospective witnesses. On 14 July 1778, after interrogating Sade and other witnesses, the appeals court overturned the sodomy conviction, finding him guilty of only "debauchery and immoderate libertinage". He was given a small fine and forbidden to enter Marseilles for three years. However, he was immediately re-arrested on a lettre de cachet and returned to police custody. Sade escaped custody while being transferred back to Paris and he returned to La Coste. On 26 August, he was re-arrested after a police raid on his château and was returned to Vincennes prison.

In prison, Sade engaged in extensive correspondence, mostly with his wife, and continued working on Voyage d'Italie and a number of plays. In the summer of 1782, he drafted Dialogue between a Priest and a Dying Man and began working on The 120 Days of Sodom. Vincennes prison was closed in February 1784 and Sade was transferred to the Bastille, where he produced a fair copy of The 120 Days of Sodom, which many critics consider his first major work. Sade began working on the novel Aline and Valcour and completed the novellas The Misfortunes of Virtue (1787) and Eugénie de Franval (1788). As revolutionary tension increased in Paris, Sade was outraged that his daily exercise was curtailed. On 2 July 1789, he improvised a megaphone and shouted to passers-by below that the warders were killing the prisoners. Sade was transferred to the Charenton insane asylum that evening. On 14 July, the Bastille was stormed by a revolutionary crowd and Sade's former cell was looted of his personal effects which remained there under seal. In March 1790, the National Constituent Assembly voted to abolish lettres de cachet and Sade was released from detention on 2 April.

=== Freedom and imprisonment (1790–1801) ===
On Sade's release, his wife sought a legal separation and the marriage was dissolved in September 1790. In August, he met Marie-Constance Quesnet, a 33-year-old actress, and they began a relationship which was to last until his death. Sade now called himself "Louis Sade, man of letters" and tried to launch a career as a writer. His novel Justine, or the Misfortunes of Virtue was published anonymously in June 1791. In October, his play Oxtiern opened at the Théâtre Molière in Paris, but closed after only two performances following audience uproar.

Sade was increasingly involved in politics, at first supporting a constitutional monarchy. However, as republican sentiment grew in 1792, Sade found himself in political difficulty due to his noble ancestry, public support of the monarchy and the emigration of his two sons. In March, his play Le Suborneur premiered at the Théâtre Italien but only lasted one night when Jacobin activists disrupted the performance. He began publicly espousing more radical republican views and became more prominent in his local revolutionary section, the Section des Piques. Following the fall of the monarchy in September 1792, he was appointed the section's commissioner on health and charitable institutions, and in October 1793 he was chosen to deliver the funeral oration for the revolutionary martyrs Marat and Le Peletier. In November, his section delegated him to deliver a petition against religion to the National Convention. His speech probably alienated Robespierre and other members of the convention and its powerful Committee of Public Safety who were attempting to suppress atheism and attacks on religion. In December 1793, Sade was arrested and charged with "moderatism", associating with counter-revolutionaries, anti-republicanism and "feigned patriotism". He was listed for execution on 27 July 1794 (9 Thermidor) but was saved either by bribery or bureaucratic error. Robespierre and his supporters fell from power that day, ending the Reign of Terror and paving the way for Sade's release from prison in October.

On his release, Sade concentrated on literature and his personal affairs. He published a series of anonymous novels: Philosophy in the Bedroom and Aline and Valcour (1795), and the first volumes of The New Justine and Juliette (1797–99). Sade had huge debts, little income from his properties, and the Vaucluse department had incorrectly placed him on its list of émigrés, leaving him vulnerable to arrest and confiscation of property. In October 1796, he was forced to sell La Coste, but his former wife obtained most of the proceeds. In 1798, Sade unsuccessfully petitioned Paul Barras, a leader of the Directory regime, to have his name removed from the list of émigrés. Sade's émigré status was finally revoked in December 1799, by which time he had fallen deeper into poverty and had registered as indigent.

In 1800, Sade published Crimes of Love, a collection of short stories published under his own name. The book received hostile reviews and a wave of articles appeared identifying Sade as the author of the scandalous Justine and Juliette.

=== Final imprisonment and death (1801–1814) ===
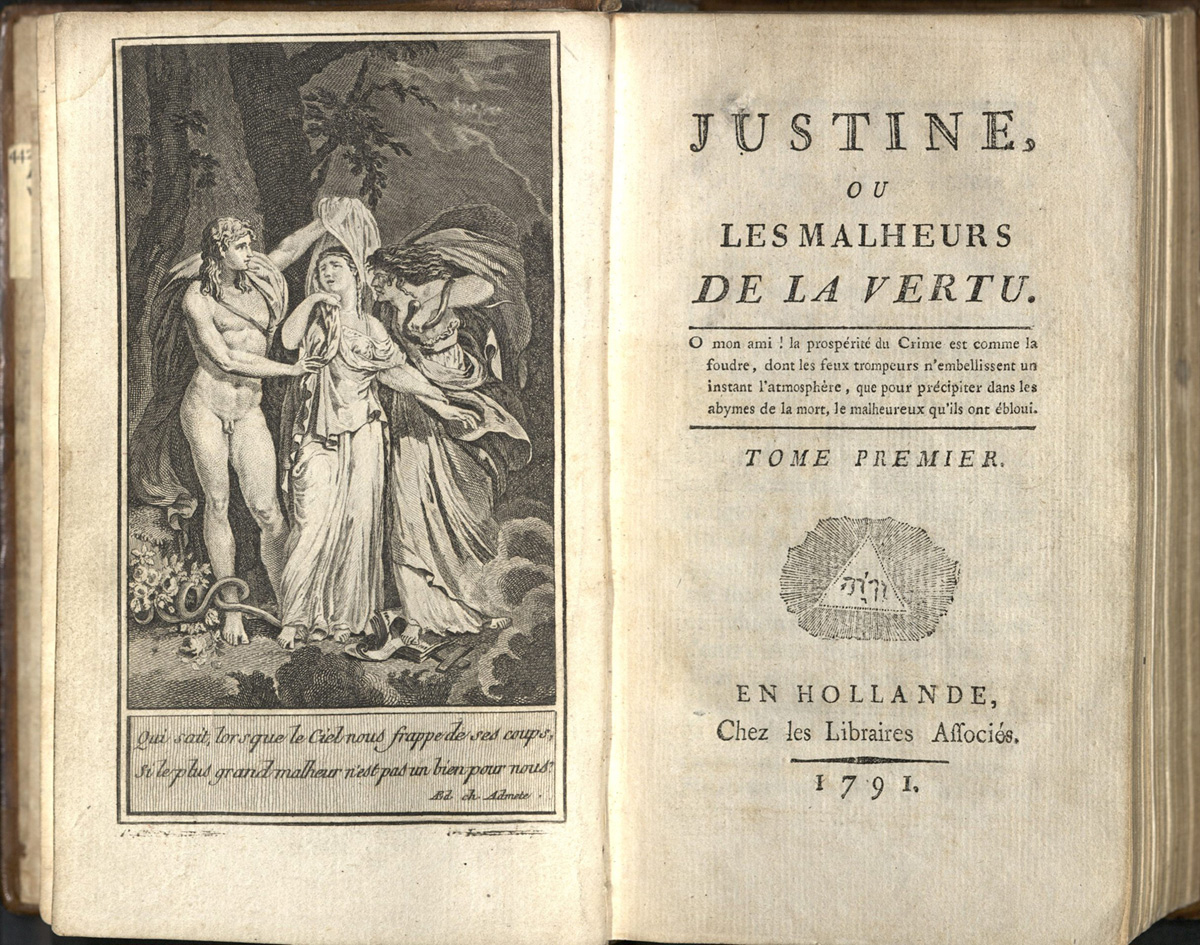
The first page of Sade's Justine, one of the works for which he was imprisoned

The Napoleonic Consulate was cracking down on public immorality and, in March 1801, Sade was arrested at his publisher's office and detained in the Sainte-Pélagie Prison. The stocks of The New Justine and Juliette were seized and the police minister Joseph Fouché ordered Sade's detention without trial as he believed the pornography laws did not provide for sufficient punishment and any trial would only increase Sade's notoriety. Following Sade's attempts to seduce young prisoners at Sainte-Pélagie, he was declared insane with "libertine dementia" and transferred to the Bicêtre Asylum.

After intervention by his family, he was transferred once more to the Charenton Asylum, where his ex-wife and children agreed to pay his room and board. Marie-Constance, pretending to be his illegitimate daughter, was allowed to live with him there. The director of Charenton, Abbé de Coulmier, attempted to run the institution on humane principles with an emphasis on "moral treatment" in accordance with the nature of the mental illness. He allowed Sade to write, produce and perform in plays, and also encouraged balls, concerts, dinners and other entertainments. In 1805, Coulmier had a theater built on the premises with seating for about 200. The performances, which included professional actors and inmates, became fashionable, attracting many among the elite of Napoleonic society.

Sade was also allowed to write. In April 1807, he completed Les journées de Florbelle, a ten-volume libertine novel. The novel was seized after a police search of Sade's and Quesnet's rooms. Sade later completed three conventional novels at Charenton.

Coulmier's novel approach to psychotherapy and the privileges granted to Sade attracted much opposition in official circles. In 1810, new police orders put Sade into solitary confinement and deprived him of pens and paper. Coulmier, however, gradually restored most of Sade's privileges.

In 1813, the government ordered Coulmier to suspend all theatrical performances, balls and concerts. By this time, Sade was in a sexual relationship with Madeleine Leclerc, the teenage daughter of an employee at Charenton. The relationship caused consternation for Quesnet and further allegations of immorality against Sade. In September 1814, the new director of Charenton asked the Bourbon restoration government to transfer Sade to another institution. Sade, however, was now seriously ill. He died on 2 December 1814 after an attack of "prostrating gangrenous fever".

Sade had left instructions in his will requesting that he be buried at Malmaison, his property in Émancé, without an autopsy or "pomp of any kind". However, Malmaison had been sold years earlier, and Sade was instead buried with religious rites at Charenton. His skull was later removed from the grave for phrenological examination. His surviving son, Claude-Armand, had all his remaining unpublished manuscripts burnt, including Les Journées de Florbelle.

=== Posthumous evaluation ===
Marshall writes that Sade's "known behaviour (which includes only the beating of a housemaid and an orgy with several prostitutes) departs greatly from the clinical picture of active sadism". Phillips states "there is no reason to believe that any of this behaviour involved compulsion". Dworkin, however, argues that the issue is whether one believes Sade or his female accusers and that admirers of Sade "attempt to justify, trivialize, or deny (even though records confirming the facts exist) every assault Sade ever committed against women and girls". Gray states that Sade engaged in "psychic terrorism" and that "Sade's brand of sadism was often more mental than corporeal". According to Bongie, Sade perpetrated "crimes of physical violence committed during sexual assaults on hapless prostitutes. Such assaults, aggravated by death threats and the element of recidivism, could easily get an offender into similar difficulties today".

== Political, religious, and philosophical views ==
John Phillips argues that Sade's views cannot be easily determined due to the "difficulty of distinguishing a single authorial voice" from the multitude of characters in his fiction. Even in Sade's letters he was often playing a role which leads to "the ultimate impossibility of identifying the real Sade through his writing". The arguments his characters use to justify their more extreme behavior are often satire, parody and irony.

Geoffrey Gorer states that Sade was in opposition to contemporary thinkers for both his "complete and continual denial of the right to property" and for viewing the political conflict in late-18th-century France as being not between "the Crown, the bourgeoisie, the aristocracy or the clergy, or sectional interests of any of these against one another", but rather all of these "more or less united against the people". Thus, Gorer argued, "he can with some justice be called the first reasoned socialist".

Peter Marshall sees Sade as a precursor to anarchism in that he was libertarian in his desire to expand human freedom and contemplated a society without laws. Ultimately, however, Sade advocated a society with minimal laws.

Marshall writes that Sade was a proponent of free public brothels paid for by the state in order to reduce sex crimes and satisfy people's wishes to command and be obeyed. Dworkin, however, states that this proposal was for compulsory prostitution from childhood on, where women and girls could be raped by men. The proposal is from one of Sade's fictional characters, Le Chevalier, in the novel Philosophy in the Bedroom. Phillips argues that the views of Sade's characters cannot always be attributed to Sade. Gray suggests that Le Chevalier's speech should be read as subversive irony.

Maurice Lever, Laurence Louis Bongie and Francine du Plessix Gray present Sade as a political opportunist whose only consistent principles were libertinage, atheism, opposition to the death penalty and the defense of his own property and aristocratic privileges. Prior to the Revolution, Sade insisted on the observance of feudal customs. After the Revolution he supported the constitutional monarchy because that was the prevailing trend. Following the overthrow of the king, he publicly advocated republicanism only to protect himself from arrest as a supporter of the monarchy. Gray concludes, "relentlessly opportunistic in his public stances, the ci-devant marquis ... was an unswerving moderate horrified by political excess".

Albert Camus, writing in 1951, argued that Sade placed the sex drive at the centre of his thought. The sex drive is natural but a blind force that dominates man. The overthrow, in 1792, of a king ruling by divine right necessarily involved the abandonment of a system of law and morals sanctioned by God and sovereign. In its place, Sade advocated absolute moral license, allowing the passions to rule. If satisfaction of the passions involves crimes such as murder then this accords with the laws of nature, for destruction is necessary for creation. But if murder is licensed, all are at risk of being murdered. Therefore, absolute freedom must entail the struggle to dominate. For Camus, Sade advocated freedom of desire for the few which required the enslavement of the majority. Sade thus prefigured totalitarianism in the name of freedom.

Phillips states that Sade was greatly influenced by the materialism of La Mettrie and Holbach and by the determinism of Hume. According to this view, God does not exist, and man and the universe are nothing but matter which is infinitely broken down and reconfigured, never perishing. Free will is an illusion because everything has a cause which is determined by the materialist laws of nature. The character of libertines is therefore determined by nature and it is pointless to punish them for something for which they are not morally responsible. Sade's libertines sometimes substitute nature for God, regarding it as a destructive force whose laws must be respected, but sometimes see nature as a rival to their own power.

John Gray argues that Sade's philosophy is fundamentally religious as it replaces God with nature. However, it is also confused as it rails against nature while nevertheless advocating that humans follow nature's "destructive impulses".

Lester Crocker argues that Sade was the first to construct "a complete system of nihilism, with all its implications, ramifications and consequences". Sade believed morals are only human conventions and that individuals have a right to ignore laws and moral precepts that are contrary to the laws of nature and to pursue goals that are in accordance with nature. His libertines argue that human virtues such as charity, pity and respect for parents are against nature and should be shunned whereas murder and theft are natural passions and should be pursued. For Sade, the only human value is the egotistical pursuit of the passions. The primary passion is the sex drive which is inextricably linked to passions for destruction, violence, and domination. For Sade's libertines, crime is not only necessary to establish and preserve their domination, it is also a pleasure in itself. They construct a hierarchy of the pleasures of crime according to which mere failure to help those in need gives the least pleasure and the torture and murder of children provide the greatest.

Crocker argues that Sade anticipated Freud in positing the primacy of the sex drive and linking it to destructive impulses. However, he sees Sade's nihilism as internally inconsistent in that he derives values from nature and posits one human value, contradicting his claim that there are no objective moral laws and leaving open the possibility that other human values can be posited and moral laws derived from nature.

== Critical reception ==
Contemporary critics were generally hostile to Sade's works. When his play Oxtiern premiered in 1791, the critic for the Moniteur stated, "there is interest and energy in the play, but the role of Oxtiern is a revolting atrocity". The anonymous Justine and Juliette were seen as obscene works. A review of Justine in the Journal Général de France stated that although Sade displayed "a rich and brilliant" imagination, "It is difficult to not often close the book out of disgust and indignation". There were rumours that Danton and Robespierre used Justine as an aid to masturbation and to inflame their lust for blood. Rétif de la Bretonne published an Anti-Justine in 1798. By 1800, numerous authors were attributing Justine to Sade. One reviewer called Sade's Crimes of Love "a detestable book written by a man suspected of having written a yet more horrible one".

The mostly hostile reception continued throughout the 19th century. The French historian Jules Michelet called Sade the "professor emeritus of crime". Although writers such as Baudelaire, Flaubert, Stendhal, Byron and Poe expressed admiration for Sade's work, Swinburne found them unintentionally funny and Anatole France said, "their most dangerous ingredient is a fatal dose of boredom". In 1886, the sexologist Krafft-Ebing treated Sade's work as a compendium of sexual pathologies and gave the term sadism its clinical definition.

Interest in Sade increased in the 20th century. His biographer Laurence Louis Bongie writes, "Many different Sades have been invented over the years, and nearly always with passionate hostility towards opposing or even complementary definitions of the man". In 1909, Guillaume Apollinaire called him "the freest spirit that has yet existed". André Breton called him "a surrealist in Sadism" committed to "total liberation, both social and moral". Others see him as a precursor to Nietzsche and Freud. Writing soon after World War II, Raymond Queneau argued that Sade's moral universe prefigured Nazism.

Simone de Beauvoir, in her essay "Must we burn Sade?" (published in 1951–52), argued that although Sade is a writer of the second rank and "unreadable", his value is making us rethink "the true nature of man's relationship to man".

After Sade's work became freely available in unexpurgated editions in France, the United States and the United Kingdom in the 1960s, critical interest in Sade accelerated. In 1971, Roland Barthes published an influential textual analysis, Sade, Fourier, Loyola, which largely resisted psychological, social and biographical interpretations of his work.

A number of prominent female commentators have praised Sade. Angela Carter, writing in 1978, argued that Sade put pornography in the service of women by claiming rights of free sexuality for them and depicting them in positions of power. Camille Paglia, writing in 1990, presented Sade as a rigorous philosopher of power relationships and sexuality who was undervalued in American academia because his emphasis on violence was difficult to accept. She argued that Sade could be best understood as a satirist, responding "point by point" to Rousseau's claims that society inhibits and corrupts mankind's innate goodness. Annie Le Brun has praised Sade for his emphasis on sexuality and the body, and has argued that Sade should be read as poetry and has been best appreciated by poets.

In contrast, Andrea Dworkin writes that in Sade's fiction women are naturally prostitutes and men have a natural right to rape women. The female libertines only enjoy power as the male libertines conceive it and only as long as they adopt violent male sexuality.

In 1990, Sade was published in the French Bibliothèque de la Pléiade series, which Roger Shattuck calls "an honor which corresponds to an artist being admitted into the Louvre". In 2014, French novelist Pierre Guyotat said, "Sade is, in a way, our Shakespeare. He has the same sense of tragedy, the same sweeping grandeur".

Andrea Dworkin, writing in 1981, condemned the veneration of Sade as a veneration of violence against women. Roger Shattuck, writing in 1996, argued that writers who try to rehabilitate Sade place too much emphasis on abstract notions of transgression, linguistic play and irony, and marginalize the sexual violence at the core of his life and work. He stated that Sade's works are likely to be harmful to the young and "unformed minds". French intellectual Michel Onfray states, "it is intellectually bizarre to make Sade a hero... Even according to his most hero-worshipping biographers, this man was a sexual delinquent".

== Cultural influence ==
Crocker sees Sade's intellectual influence in the 19th century as reflected in writers such as Stendhal, Baudelaire and Dostoevsky, and thinkers such as Stirner and Nietzsche. However, he states that Sade's greatest impact was on the 20th century. In 1963 Crocker wrote, "Sade speaks with the loudest voice to our time... for it is our age that has had to live the truths he revealed... It is in the twentieth century that the failure of rationalism, revealed in history and psychology, has plunged our arts and often our acts into the absurd of nihilism".

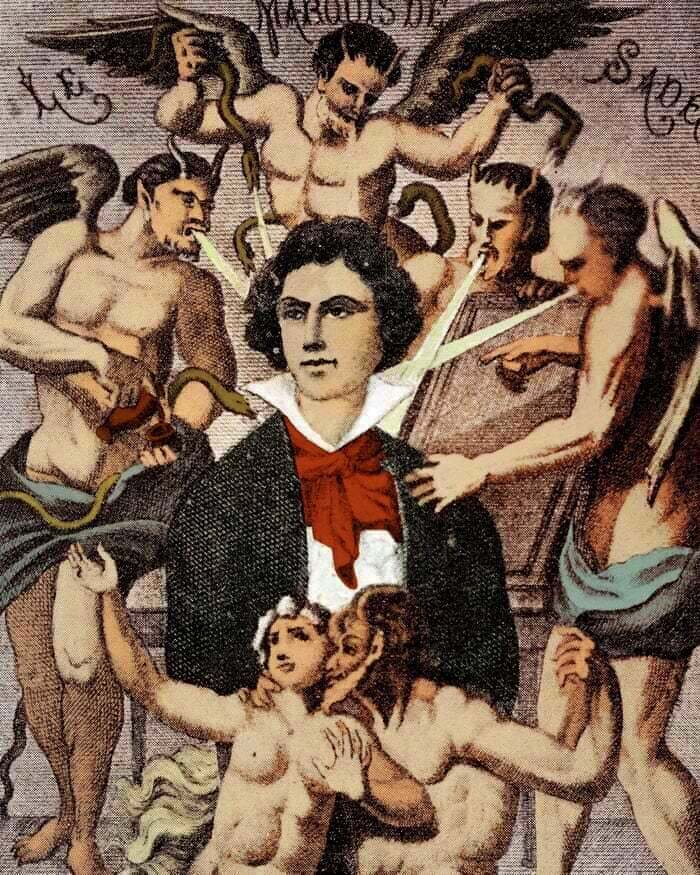
Depiction of the Marquis de Sade by H. Biberstein in L'Œuvre du marquis de Sade, Guillaume Apollinaire (Edit.), Bibliothèque des Curieux, Paris, 1912

Sade has also entered Western culture as a case study in sexual pathology. Sexual sadism disorder, a mental condition named after Sade, has been defined as experiencing sexual arousal in response to extreme pain, suffering or humiliation done non-consensually to others (as described by Sade in his novels). Other terms have been used to describe the condition, which may overlap with other sexual preferences that also involve inflicting pain. It is distinct from situations where consenting individuals use mild or simulated pain or humiliation for sexual excitement.

After World War II, Sade attracted increasing interest from intellectuals such as Georges Bataille, Michel Foucault, Camille Paglia and others as an early thinker on issues of sexuality, the body, transgression and nihilism.

A. D. Farr suggested that Sade's writing, particularly Philosophy in the Bedroom, influenced the subsequent medical and social acceptance of abortion in Western society. Dworkin, however, argues that Sade only extolled abortion as a form of murder which he sexualized. He more frequently advocated the murder of pregnant women. Phillips argues that the sexual liberation of the 1960s was the result of complex social factors and the availability of the contraceptive pill rather than the ideas of Sade.

Sade's writing has achieved commercial success since it became freely available in the 1960s. The American edition of Justine and Philosophy in the Bedroom alone sold 350,000 copies from 1965 to 1990 and about 4,000 copies a year from 1990 to 1996. Shattuck sees the cultural rehabilitation of Sade after World War II as an "eerie, post-Nietzschean death wish". Noting that Sade has been elevated into the French literary canon and that serial killers Ian Brady and Ted Bundy read and admired Sade, he concludes that Sade's "profusely illustrated moral nihilism has entered our cultural bloodstream at the highest intellectual and lowest criminal levels".

Phillips, in contrast, argues that Sade's enduring legacy is in replacing theological interpretations of the world with a materialist humanism thus contributing to "a modern intellectual climate in which all absolutisms are regarded with suspicion".

Cultural representations of Sade's life and work increased from the early 20th century, particularly among artists interested in the themes of freedom and human sexuality. Surrealists such as Breton and Éluard regarded Sade highly, and Man Ray, Salvador Dalí, Luis Buñuel and others represented Sade and Sadeian themes in art and film. Sade's influence on the arts continued after World War II, including the plays Marat/Sade (Peter Weiss, 1964) and Madame de Sade (Mishima, 1965), and the films Salò (Pasolini, 1975) and Quills (Kaufman, 2000).

== Writing ==
Sade's writing includes novels, stories, plays, dialogues, travelogues, essays, letters, journals and political tracts. Many of his works have been lost or destroyed.

=== Libertine novels ===
Sade is best known for his libertine novels which combine graphic descriptions of sex and violence with long didactic passages in which his characters discuss the moral, religious, political and philosophical implications of their acts. The characters engage in a range of acts including blasphemy, sexual intercourse, incest, sodomy, flagellation, coprophilia, necrophilia and the rape, torture and murder of adults and children. The libertines argue that these acts accord with the laws of nature. Sade's major libertine novels are The 120 Days of Sodom (written 1785, first published 1899), Justine (two versions, published 1791 and 1797–99), Philosophy in the Bedroom (a novel in dialogue, published 1795) and Juliette (published 1797–99). The libertine novels include elements of pornography, Gothic fiction, moral and didactic tales, dark fairy tales in the manner of the brothers Grimm, and social, political and literary satire.

=== Other novels and tales ===
Sade's first substantial prose work was the Dialogue Between a Priest and a Dying Man, written in 1782 while he was in prison. The work is not pornographic but outlines some of his main themes including the non-existence of God or an afterlife, nature as semi-divine, materialism and determinism, the permanent flux of living matter, a relativist and pragmatic morality, and a defence of libertinism. In prison he drafted an epistolary novel, Aline and Valcour (published 1795), and the novella The Misfortunes of Virtue, which he later expanded into the two versions of Justine. He also wrote about fifty tales, of which eleven were published under his own name, in the collection The Crimes of Love in 1800. The tales were not pornographic but contained themes of incest, libertinage and disaster.

In 1812–13, while confined at the Charenton insane asylum, he wrote three conventional historical novels: Adelaide of Brunswick, Princess of Saxony; The Secret History of Isabelle of Bavaria; and The Marquise de Gange.

=== Plays ===
Sade had a life-long interest in theater and during his first extended incarceration he wrote about twenty plays. Oxtiern and Le Suborneur were professionally staged on his release and he organized several others to be staged semi-professionally when he was confined at the Charenton asylum. According to critic John Phillips, "the overwritten melodramas he composed for the theatre have not attracted much critical interest to date, and are unlikely to ever do so".

=== Essays and political tracts ===
Sade's "Reflections on the Novel" was published as a preface to the collection The Crimes of Love in 1800. Sade reviews the development of the novel from classical times to the 18th century and provides rules for aspiring novelists. Sade advised writers not to depart from what is possible; not to interrupt the plot with repetitious or tangential incidents; that the author should leave any necessary moralizing to his characters; and that the author should not write primarily for money. Phillips and Edmund Wilson have praised Sade's knowledge of the history of European fiction while noting that in his libertine novels he violated most of his own principles for writing good fiction.

Sade's avowed political writings include his "Address to the King" (1791), his pamphlet "Idea on the method for the sanctioning of laws" (1792) and his eulogy for the revolutionaries Marat and Le Peletier (1793). In his 1791 address, Sade advocated a constitutional monarchy. In the 1792 pamphlet, Sade argued that all laws passed by the legislature should be ratified by local assemblies of active citizens. In his 1793 eulogy, he praised Marat and Le Peletier as "sublime martyrs of liberty". Phillips, Gray and others have speculated on whether these writings express Sade's real political views or were parodies or exercises in political expediency to forestall his possible persecution as a former aristocrat.

=== Letters and journals ===
Over 200 of Sade's letters, mostly written to his wife from prison, have been published since his death. Sade's journals for 1807–8 and July–December 1814 also survive. Bongie has called his prison letters "his lasting literary achievement". Richard Seaver states that the prison letters "reveal more about this most enigmatic of men than any of his other work". Phillips warns that in his letters and journals Sade was often playing a role and creating a fictionalized version of himself.

== Legacy ==
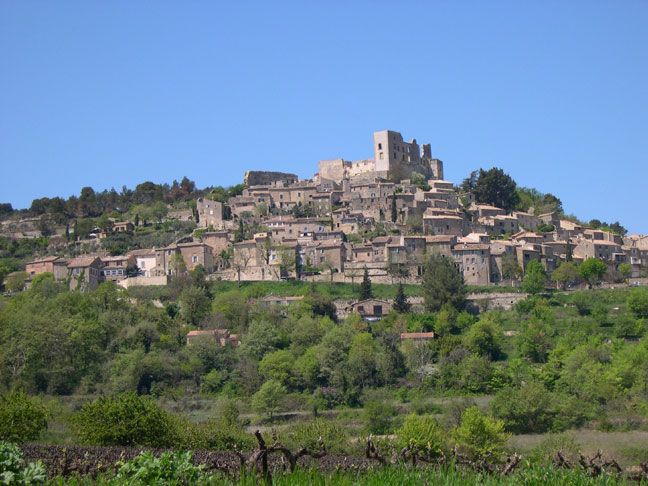
The Château de Lacoste above Lacoste, a residence of Sade; currently the site of theatre festivals

For many years, Sade's descendants regarded his life and work as a scandal to be suppressed. This did not change until the mid-20th century, when the Comte Xavier de Sade reclaimed the marquis title, long fallen into disuse, and took an interest in his ancestor's writings. He subsequently discovered a store of Sade's papers in the family château at Condé-en-Brie, and worked with scholars for decades to enable their publication. His youngest son, the Marquis Thibault de Sade, has continued the collaboration. The family have also claimed a trademark on the name. The family sold the Château de Condé in 1983. As well as the manuscripts they retain, others are held in universities and libraries. Many, however, were lost in the 18th and 19th centuries. A substantial number were destroyed after Sade's death at the instigation of his son, Donatien-Claude-Armand.

Sade's favorite castle at Lacoste was bought and partially restored by Pierre Cardin. Since the restoration it has been used as a site for theater and music festivals.

The Sade documents found in 1948 became the basis for Gilbert Lely's important biography of Sade published in two volumes in 1952 and 1957. Volumes of Sade's letters, journals and other personal documents have been published progressively from 1949. In 1966, the French publisher Jean-Jacques Pauvert published a 30-volume edition of his complete works. From 1990, Sade's works were published in the French Pléiade editions.

The 20th century serial killers Ian Brady and Ted Bundy read works by and about Sade as well as other violent pornography. There is scholarly debate over whether Sade and violent pornography in general influenced later crimes.

== See also ==
- BDSM
- Leopold von Sacher-Masoch
- Sexual fetishism

== Works cited ==
- Bongie, Laurence Louis (1998). Sade: A Biographical Essay. Chicago: University of Chicago Press. ISBN 0-226-06420-4.
- Camus, Albert (1953). The Rebel. Translated by Bower, Anthony. London: Hamish Hamilton.
- Carter, Angela (1978). The Sadeian Woman and the Ideology of Pornography. New York: Pantheon Books. ISBN 0-394-75893-5.
- Crocker, Lester G. (1963). Nature and Culture: Ethical Thought in the French Enlightenment. Baltimore: The Johns Hopkins Press.
- Dworkin, Andrea (1981). Pornography: Men Possessing Women. London: The Women's Press. ISBN 0-7043-3876-9.
- Gorer, Geoffrey (1964). The Revolutionary Ideas of the Marquis de Sade (3rd ed.). London: Panther Books.
- Gray, Francine du Plessix (1998). At Home with the Marquis de Sade: a life. New York: Simon & Schuster. ISBN 0-684-80007-1.
- Gray, John (2018). Seven Types of Atheism. New York: Farrar, Straus and Giroux.
- Lever, Maurice (1993). Marquis de Sade, a biography. Translated by Goldhammer, Arthur. London: Harper Collins. ISBN 0-246-13666-9.
- Love, Brenda (2002). The Encyclopedia of Unusual Sex Practices. London: Abacus. ISBN 978-0-349-11535-1.
- Marshall, Peter (2008). Demanding the impossible: a history of Anarchism. Oakland: PM Press. ISBN 978-1-60486-064-1.
- Paglia, Camille (1990). Sexual Personae: Art and Decadence from Nefertiti to Emily Dickinson. New York: Vintage. ISBN 0-679-73579-8.
- Phillips, John (2005). How to Read Sade. New York: W. W. Norton and Company. ISBN 0-393-32822-8.
- Queenan, Joe (2004). Malcontents. Philadelphia: Running Press. ISBN 978-0-7624-1697-4.
- Sade, Donatien Alphonse François, Marquis de (1965). Seaver, Richard; Wainhouse, Austryn (eds.). The Complete Justine, Philosophy in the Bedroom and other writings. Grove Press.
- Sade, Donatien Alphonse François, Marquis de (2000). Seaver, Richard (ed.). Letters from Prison. London: Harvill Press. ISBN 1-86046-807-1.
- Schaeffer, Neal (2000). The Marquis de Sade: a Life. New York City: Knopf Doubleday. ISBN 978-0-67400-392-7.
- Shattuck, Roger (1996). Forbidden Knowledge: From Prometheus to Pornography. New York: St. Martin's Press. ISBN 0-312-14602-7.
