= Apparition (company) =

Former U.S. film distribution company

- Industry: Film distribution
- Founded: August 6, 2009
- Founders: Bob Berney; Bill Pohlad
- Defunct: September 26, 2010
- Fate: Suspended operations in May 2010; closed after selling The Tree of Life to Fox Searchlight Pictures
- Headquarters: New York City
- Number of employees: 27 (May 2010)

Apparition was a New York City-based independent film distributor founded by industry veteran Bob Berney (who served as its CEO) and film producer Bill Pohlad (who also founded earlier on, River Road Entertainment). Launched in August 2009, the company specialised in selections from the arthouse and independent film circuits. After releasing six feature films and one short, Apparition suspended its operations in May 2010 when Berney announced his resignation. It closed in late September 2010 after laying off its staff and selling the rights to its last remaining title, The Tree of Life, to Fox Searchlight Pictures.

== History ==
=== Founding ===
"There's been a real need for this for quite a while. With fewer companies in the marketplace, there's a need for filmmakers to have an outlet in the U.S. And it's a great time business-wise to be able to acquire films when there's much less competition in the marketplace. We want to reach people with films that wouldn't have a chance in the larger studio system."

— Bob Berney on the founding of Apparition, Minneapolis Star-Tribune (August 2009)

Based in New York City, Apparition was launched by Bob Berney and Bill Pohlad on August 6, 2009. Berney was previously employed at Newmarket Films, IFC Films, and Time Warner's Picturehouse; Pohlad, who produced films through his River Road Entertainment, also served as the new company's investor and put up an estimated $30 million to run the venture. He also suggested the brand name, according to Berney; "[since the word means 'vision',] we felt the name suggested something exciting on the horizon. A new vision." Four years before Apparition's launch, both teamed up for the production of A Prairie Home Companion, filmed in Pohlad's home area of Minneapolis-St. Paul and released by Picturehouse.

Pohlad initiated Apparition out of spite for what he saw as Paramount Vantage's lackluster distribution of an earlier River Road production, Into the Wild (2007), which faced competition from several other films on parent studio Paramount's slate. As Berney told Film Journal International in December 2009:

"[After what befell Wild], he wanted more control [over distribution]. The film needed to expand but the right way wasn't clear. Yes, it's rough now but there are so few distributors out there, so we wanted to be smart and get lucky. And it's important to remember that audiences haven't said, 'We don't want to see independent pictures.' In fact, audiences keep expanding even though access has become a bottleneck."

=== Operational tenure ===
Bob Berney was the CEO of Apparition during its existence; several past partners of his were also employed there, with his wife Jeanne "on the marketing team in New York". The company purchased, distributed and marketed a mix of arthouse and independently produced films, leading Berney to remark in 2009: "We're in every kind of film business but focusing on diverse, underserved audiences." According to the Minneapolis Star-Tribune's Colin Covert in 2010, "the company aims to reflect the refined taste and integrity that characterize Pohlad's film productions... [Its] staff of 26 in New York, Los Angeles and Chicago [works on] crafting the ads, selecting the theaters and weighing factors as diverse as opening-week weather, the TV sports schedule and the target audience's bedtime." Since Pohlad was a native of Minneapolis, Apparition vowed to make its films available to the Minneapolis-St. Paul market on their opening weekends. U.S. home-media releases and TV distribution of its output went through Sony Pictures, while Canadian rights were handled by Alliance Films.

Prior to Apparition's founding, Berney and Pohlad picked up British period drama Bright Star during the 2009 Cannes Film Festival. During its inaugural month in operation, the company obtained the U.S. rights to Jean-Marc Vallée's The Young Victoria. In September 2009, it screened Bright Star at the Toronto International Film Festival (TIFF), and announced co-distribution of its next two titles—Black Dynamite and The Boondock Saints II: All Saints Day—with Sony Pictures Worldwide Acquisitions (SPWA). A later project, The Runaways, was distributed on behalf of River Road Entertainment, while 2008 Australian import The Square was picked up in January 2010 thanks to Berney's interest in director Nash Edgerton's companion short film Spider. At the time of its operation, Apparition planned to release five films during 2010, and 7–8 in 2011.

=== Departure of Bob Berney and closure ===
On May 11, 2010, before leaving the U.S. for Cannes, Berney announced his resignation from Apparition via an e-mail to Pohlad, who was surprised at his partner's decision. A string of underperforming titles, and "disputes over the distribution" of The Runaways, were cited as factors. Although the company suspended its operations as a result of Berney's departure, Pohlad vowed to remain committed to Apparition's upkeep while a successor was being sought. "Though Berney said little about why he left," wrote The Wrap's Sharon Waxman, "it seems clear that he felt his hands were tied by the pursestring decisions of his boss Pohlad." Attempts to relocate to Los Angeles that July, with a reduced staff, did not come to fruition, and the entire team was eventually laid off. On September 26, 2010, Apparition went out of business when Pohlad sold off the distribution rights to Terrence Malick's The Tree of Life to Fox Searchlight Pictures. Tree was part of the company's launch slate and initially intended for late 2009, but eventually found release in 2011 after several years of prolonged post-production.

Apparition's three remaining titles were later transferred to other distributors. River Road's political bio-drama Fair Game (once considered under the Apparition banner) moved to Summit Entertainment, while Samuel Goldwyn Films took over as SPWA's distribution partner for Jake Scott's Welcome to the Rileys. Berney also wanted to pick up the Alex Gibney documentary Client 9: The Rise and Fall of Eliot Spitzer during its Tribeca Film Festival appearance; after Pohlad "balked at [the idea]", Apparition's release was eventually called off. By August 2010, Client 9 was acquired by Magnolia Pictures en route to its TIFF run.

Three years after he left Apparition, Berney would re-establish Picturehouse as an independently owned outlet after several years of dormancy. Interviewed by Variety in March 2013, he explained the circumstances behind his final days at the former company:

For what we do, you always have to acquire films, you have to be moving. I just didn't want to go through another Cannes, and my contract was up. It was positioned in a way that (my exit) seemed abrupt, but we'd been trying to buy films for a long time. I was tired of showing up and not buying anything. I like Bill; it wasn't personal. But he's a producer and a producer/filmmaker at heart. Distribution is a different business: You have to find movies and love them as much as your own. That's hard for producers.

== Filmography ==
| Release date | Title | Notes |
|---|---|---|
| September 16, 2009 | Bright Star | First release; opened in UK theaters on November 6, 2009 |
| October 16, 2009 | Black Dynamite | Co-released with SPWA |
| October 30, 2009 | The Boondock Saints II: All Saints Day | Co-released with SPWA |
| December 18, 2009 | The Young Victoria | Originally scheduled for November 13, 2009; produced by GK Films |
| March 19, 2010 | The Runaways | With River Road Entertainment |
| April 9, 2010 | The Square | U.S. release of 2008 Australian film |
| April 9, 2010 | Spider | Short film; screened alongside The Square |
