= Paul McGill (actor) =

American actor, choreographer, and director

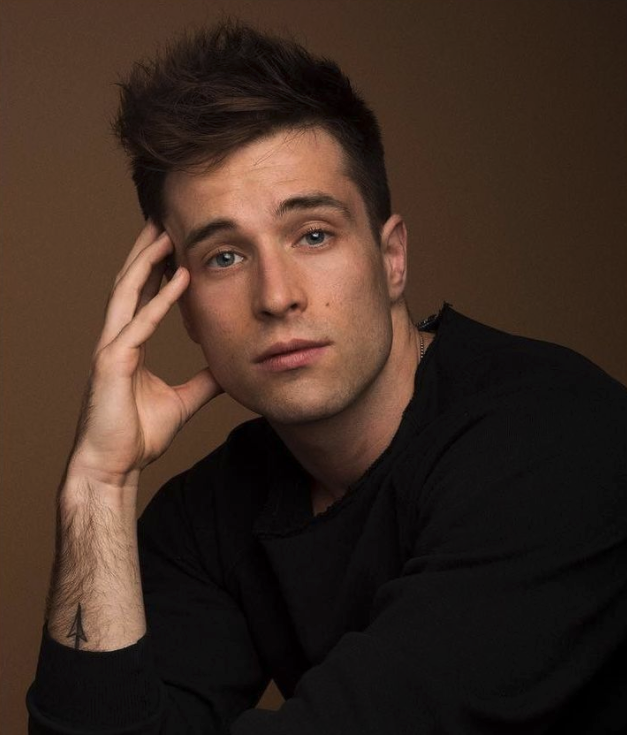
- Born: Paul Edwin McGill III; September 3, 1987 (age 38); Pittsburgh, Pennsylvania, U.S.
- Occupation: Director / Choreographer
- Years active: 2004–present
- Awards: NAACP Award, Astaire Award, Ovation Award
- Website: www.paul-mcgill.com

Paul Edwin McGill III (born September 3, 1987) is an American choreographer and director for theatre, film, and television.

== Early life and training ==
McGill was raised in Pittsburgh, Pennsylvania, where he began studying dance and performance at the age of 3. He trained alongside his sister, Emily McGill, and studied with teachers including Lenora Nemetz and Rachelle Rak.

== Performing career ==
McGill made his Broadway debut in the 2004 revival of La Cage aux Folles while attending the Professional Performing Arts School in New York City. He later played Mark in the Broadway revival of A Chorus Line that was featured in the documentary Every Little Step. During this period, he also appeared in the BAFTA and Academy Award–winning documentary Man on Wire, portraying Philippe Petit in reenactments. McGill subsequently starred in the 2009 MGM film Fame as Kevin, opposite Bebe Neuwirth. He later had roles in the Nickelodeon series Victorious, NBC’s Smash, and the film House Hunting. He returned to Broadway in Memphis, followed by Spider-Man: Turn Off the Dark, and the original Broadway production of Bullets Over Broadway.

== Choreography and direction ==
While performing on Broadway, McGill began his creative career serving concurrently as associate choreographer of the Broadway production of Hedwig and the Angry Inch, working with performers including John Cameron Mitchell, Neil Patrick Harris, Michael C. Hall, Darren Criss, Andrew Rannells, and Taye Diggs. He later served as associate choreographer on Ivo van Hove’s Broadway production of West Side Story.

He subsequently established himself as a choreographer in the downtown New York theatre scene, creating movement for several Off-Broadway productions. This included The Legend of Georgia McBride by Matthew Lopez, for which he received a Lucille Lortel Award nomination and earned a Fred Astaire Award. The production later transferred to the Geffen Playhouse in Los Angeles, where his choreography received an NAACP Award. and an Ovation Award. Additional Off-Broadway choreography credits include See What I Wanna See by Michael John LaChiusa, Which Way to the Stage by Ana Nogueira, Steve by Mark Gerrard, directed by Cynthia Nixon, and The School for Scandal, for which he also served as associate director. Regionally, he choreographed tick, tick... BOOM! at the Kennedy Center, directed by Neil Patrick Harris.

Alongside his theatre work, McGill developed choreography for circus and physical theatre as a creative company member of the American circus company Short Round Productions. Their premiere work, Filament, toured internationally and was presented at festivals including the Edinburgh Fringe and Adelaide Fringe.

McGill has also worked extensively in film and television. His choreography credits include Wild Things for Apple TV+, starring Andrew Garfield, Jude Law, and Jessica Madsen. He has choreographed for RuPaul’s Drag Race, featuring performers including Jinkx Monsoon and Monét X Change. He served as associate choreographer for Annie Live! on NBC, featuring Nicole Scherzinger, Tituss Burgess, Taraji P. Henson, and Harry Connick Jr., and worked on Schmigadoon! for Apple TV+. He coached Laverne Cox for her portrayal of Dr. Frank-N-Furter in FOX’s television adaptation of The Rocky Horror Picture Show. McGill has also served as associate choreographer on Étoile for Amazon Prime Video.

McGill has expanded into directing and movement direction for theatre and interdisciplinary performance internationally. He served as movement director for The Land of the Living at the National Theatre in London, collaborating closely with director and mentor Stephen Daldry and actor Juliet Stevenson. This production is available on National Theatre Live. He directed and choreographed the world premiere production of Midnight at the Palace, based on the Cockettes, presented at the Edinburgh Festival Fringe, which received 5 star critical acclaim. McGill has directed and choreographed concert and commercial performance projects internationally, including campaigns for the Japanese brand PARCO in collaboration with Kin Chan Coebel and Jónsi of Sigur Rós. He continues to serve as Associate Artistic Director of Festival PAAX in Mexico alongside mentor Christopher Wheeldon and has restaged his work for New York City Ballet.

== Filmography ==
Film
Year	Title	Role	Director	Company
2008	Every Little Step	Himself	James D. Stern, Adam Del Deo	James D. Stern, Adam Del Deo
2008	Man on Wire	Philippe Petit	James Marsh	Magnolia Pictures
2009	Fame	Kevin	Kevin Tancharoen	MGM, Lakeshore Entertainment
2012	House Hunting	Jason		Pillage & Plunder Pictures
2025	The Land of the Living	Movement Director	Stephen Daldry	National Theatre Live

Television
Year	Title	Role		Notes
2010	Victorious	Luke	Nickelodeon	Episode: "Tori the Zombie"
2013	Smash	Dancer	NBC	Season 2
2016	The Rocky Horror Picture Show	Coach	FOX	Coach to Laverne Cox
2021	Schmigadoon!	Asst Choreographer, Pre-Vis Editor	Apple TV+	Season 1
2021	Annie Live!	Assoc Choreographer	NBC	
2025	Étoile	Assoc Choreographer	Amazon Prime Video	Season 1, Episode 8
2025	RuPaul's Drag Race season 17	Choreographer	World of Wonder	ft. Monét X Change
2025	RuPaul's Drag Race All Stars season 10	Choreographer	World of Wonder	ft. Jinkx Monsoon
2026	Wild Things (upcoming)	Choreographer	Apple TV+	
