= Sony Pictures Worldwide Acquisitions =

Division of Sony Pictures

Sony Pictures Worldwide Acquisitions Inc.
- Type: Division
- Industry: Entertainment
- Founded: 2007; 19 years ago, in Hollywood, Los Angeles, California, US
- Headquarters: 10202 West Washington Boulevard, Culver City, California, US
- Key people: Joseph Matukewicz (President); Virginia Longmuir (Executive Vice President of Business Affairs)
- Products: Motion pictures
- Number of employees: 30
- Parent: Sony Pictures
- Divisions: Affirm Films; Destination Films; Stage 6 Films
- Website: www.stage6films.com

Sony Pictures Worldwide Acquisitions (SPWA) is a specialty film division of Sony Pictures. The company specializes in acquiring and producing films for a wide variety of distribution platforms.

== History ==
Logo used from 2007 to 2026

The group became a stand-alone division of Sony Pictures in 2007. Originally being called as Sony Pictures Worldwide Acquisitions Group (SPWAG), the group's name was changed to "Sony Pictures Worldwide Acquisitions" (SPWA) in late 2010. The group had sometimes been called "Sony Pictures Entertainment (SPE) Worldwide Acquisitions Group".

In 2007, besides Destination Films, Sony launched a standalone subsidiary Stage 6 Films, to sell titles for the genre DTV market, and Affirm Films to sell titles for the faith market.

SPWA produces and acquires about 60 films per year, usually through Stage 6 Films, Affirm Films, and Destination Films. SPWA releases some of its films theatrically; the group would analyze how much a theatrical release would impact a film's TV, VOD and home video revenue, and then the group would determine whether the film should bows theatrically.

In the case of theatrical releases, SPWA will offer the films to Sony's distribution labels (i.e. TriStar Pictures, Screen Gems, Columbia Pictures, and Sony Pictures Classics) firstly; then, if Sony's distribution labels pass on the films, the company will release the films through other distributors.

SPWA also has the rights to the Morgan Creek Entertainment library via Revolution Studios since 2016.

== Select United States theatrical releases ==
=== 2000s ===
- Paprika (2007) (production of Madhouse)
- Daddy Day Camp (2007) (production of Revolution Studios)
- Revolver (2007) (production of EuropaCorp. Co-released with Samuel Goldwyn Films)
- Rise: Blood Hunter (2007) (production of Ghost House Pictures. Co-released with Samuel Goldwyn Films)
- Seraphim Falls (2007) (production of Icon Productions. Co-released with Samuel Goldwyn Films)
- Slipstream (2007) (Independently produced. Co-released with Strand Releasing)
- Southland Tales (2007) (production of Darko Entertainment and Wild Bunch. Co-released with Samuel Goldwyn Films)
- Tekkonkinkreet (2007) (production on behalf of Studio 4C)
- The Nines (2007) (production of Newmarket Films)
- We Own The Night (2007) (production of 2929 Productions)
- Dark Streets (2008) (production of Capture Film International. Co-released with Samuel Goldwyn Films)
- Kabluey (2008) (Independently produced. Co-released with Regent Releasing)
- Elegy (2008) (production of Lakeshore Entertainment. Co-released with Samuel Goldwyn Films)
- Fireproof (2008) (production of Sherwood Pictures. Co-released with Samuel Goldwyn Films)
- Married Life (2008) (production of Sidney Kimmel Entertainment and Anonymous Content)
- The Perfect Holiday (2008) (production of Flavor Unit Films. Co-released with Yari Film Group)
- Black Dynamite (2009) (production of Ars Nova. Co-released with Apparition)
- Blood: The Last Vampire (2009) (production of East Wing Holdings Corp. and SAJ. Co-released with Samuel Goldwyn Films)
- District 9 (2009) (production of WingNut Films and QED International)
- Moon (2009) (production of Liberty Films UK)
- Planet 51 (2009) (production of Ilion Animation Studios and HandMade Films)
- The Boondock Saints II: All Saints Day (2009) (Independently produced. Co-released with Apparition)
- The Imaginarium of Doctor Parnassus (2009) (production of Davis Films and Infinity Features)
- The Young Victoria (2009) (production of GK Films. Co-released with Apparition)

=== 2010s ===
- To Save A Life (2010) (production of New Song Pictures. Co-released with Samuel Goldwyn Films)
- Chloe (2010) (production of StudioCanal and The Montecito Picture Company)
- Defendor (2010) (production of Alliance Films and Darius Films)
- Faster (2010) (production of CBS Films and Castle Rock Entertainment)
- Harry Brown (2010) (production of Hanway Films. Co-released with Samuel Goldwyn Films)
- Legion (2010) (production of Bold Films)
- REC 2 (2010) (production of Filmax Entertainment and Castelao Productions)
- Red Hill (2010) (production of Arclight Films and Screen Australia. Co-released with Strand Releasing)
- The Tourist (2010) (production of GK Films and Spyglass Entertainment)
- Welcome to the Rileys (2010) (production of Scott Free Productions and Argonaut Pictures. Co-released with Samuel Goldwyn Films)
- A Good Old Fashioned Orgy (2011) (production of Endgame Entertainment. Co-released with Samuel Goldwyn Films)
- Attack the Block (2011) (production of Film4 and StudioCanal)
- Bloodworth (2011) (Independently produced. Co-released with Samuel Goldwyn Films)
- Colombiana (2011) (production of EuropaCorp)
- Courageous (2011) (production of Sherwood Pictures and Provident Films)
- Elektra Luxx (2011) (production of Gato Negro Films. Co-released with Samuel Goldwyn Films)
- Insidious (2011) (production of Alliance Films and IM Global. Co-released with FilmDistrict)
- Jumping the Broom (2011) (Produced in-house)
- Midnight in Paris (2011) (production of Mediapro)
- POM Wonderful Presents: The Greatest Movie Ever Sold (2011) (production of Snoot Entertainment and Warrior Poets)
- Salvation Boulevard (2011) (production of Mandalay Pictures. Co-released with IFC Films)
- Soul Surfer (2011) (production of Mandalay Pictures, Enticing Entertainment and Brookwell/McNamara Entertainment. Co-released with FilmDistrict)
- The Grace Card (2011) (production of Provident Films. Co-released with Samuel Goldwyn Films)
- Bel Ami (2012) (production of Protagonist Pictures and Rai Cinema. Co-released with Magnolia Pictures)
- Detention (2012) (Independently produced. Co-released with Samuel Goldwyn Films)
- Looper (2012) (production of Endgame Entertainment and DMG Entertainment. Co-released with FilmDistrict)
- Meeting Evil (2012) (production of Motion Picture Corporation of America. Co-released with Magnolia Pictures)
- The Pirates! Band of Misfits (2012) (production of Aardman Animations)
- Red Dawn (2012) (production of Metro-Goldwyn-Mayer, United Artists, Contrafilm, and Vincent Newman Entertainment. Co-released with FilmDistrict)
- Robot & Frank (2012) (production of Park Pictures. Co-released with Samuel Goldwyn Films)
- The Raid: Redemption (2012) (production of XYZ Films, Celluloid Nightmares and P.T. Merantau Films)
- Sparkle (2012) (Produced in-house)
- The First Time (2012) (production of Jerimaca Films. Co-released with Samuel Goldwyn Films)
- Tonight You're Mine (2012) (production of BBC Films, Sigma Films and Creative Scotland. Co-released with Roadside Attractions)
- Lake Placid: The Final Chapter (2012)
- Universal Soldier: Day of Reckoning (2012) (production of Foresight Unlimited. Co-released with Magnolia Pictures)
- A Dark Truth (2013) (production of RollerCoaster Entertainment. Co-released with Magnolia Pictures)
- Austenland (2013) (production of Fickle Fish Films)
- The Call (2013) (production of WWE Studios and Troika Pictures)
- Cold Comes the Night (2013) (Independently produced. Co-released with Samuel Goldwyn Films)
- Elysium (2013) (production of Media Rights Capital)
- Evil Dead (2013) (production of Ghost House Pictures and FilmDistrict)
- Insidious Chapter 2 (2013) (production of Blumhouse Productions and Entertainment One. Co-released with FilmDistrict)
- Stalingrad (2014) (production of Russia One and Cinema Fund)
- Pompeii (2014) (production of Impact Pictures and Constantin Film, co-release with FilmDistrict )
- Moms' Night Out (2014) (production of Provident Films and Pure Flix Entertainment)
- When the Game Stands Tall (2014) (production of Mandalay Pictures)
- The Raid 2: Berandal (2014) (production of XYZ Films, Celluloid Nightmares and P.T. Merantau Films)
- The Remaining (2014) (distributed by Affirm Films)
- Predestination (2014) (production of Blacklab Entertainment, Screen Australia and Wolfhound Pictures)
- Insidious: Chapter 3 (2015) (co-distributed by Gramercy Pictures)
- The Final Girls (2015) (distributed by Vertical Entertainment and Stage 6 Films).
- Ratter (2016) (distributed by Destination Films and Vertical Entertainment)
- The Bronze (2016) (distributed by Sony Pictures Classics)
- Fallen (2016) (co-distributed by Vertical Entertainment)
- Professor Marston & The Wonder Women (2017) (co-distributed by Annapurna Pictures)
- November Criminals (2017) (co-distributed by Vertical Entertainment)
- Insidious: The Last Key (2018) (co-distributed by Universal Pictures)
- Golden Exits (2018) (co-distributed by Vertical Entertainment)
- Gemini (2018) (distributed by Neon)
- Boundaries (2018)
- The Wedding Guest (2019) (distributed by IFC Films)

=== 2020s ===
- Yellow Rose (2020)
- Long Weekend (2021) (distributed by Stage 6 Films)
- Here Today (2021) (distributed by Stage 6 Films)
- A Mouthful of Air (2021) (distributed by Stage 6 Films)
- Sisu (2023) (co-distributed by Lionsgate and Nordisk Film)
