= Bob Berney =

American film executive

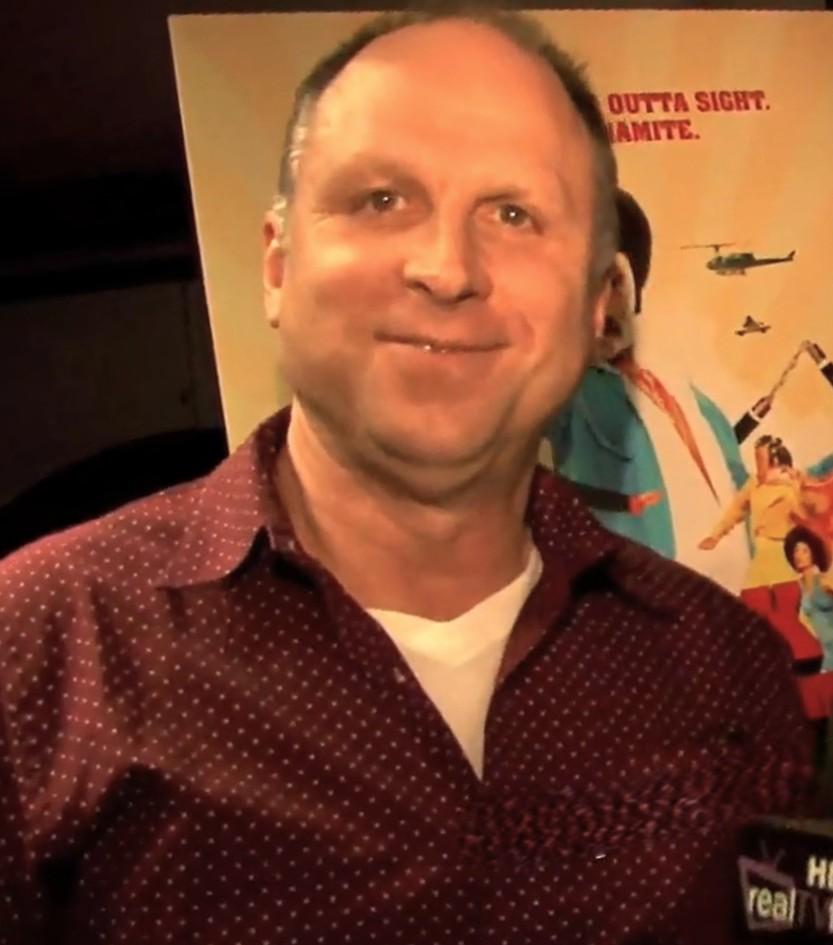
Berney in 2009

Bob Berney (born 1953) is an American independent film executive based in Los Angeles. He is the co-founder and CEO of Picturehouse, a film distribution and marketing company that employs a multi-channel distribution model anchored in theatrical exhibition. Berney is known for using targeted campaigns and affinity marketing to cultivate an event atmosphere, building word of mouth to support expansion from a platform release to a wider theatrical run.

Berney has been credited by prominent filmmakers for playing a key role in their breakthrough releases. These include Guillermo Del Toro, who wrote in a January 2026 post on X that his Academy Award-winning film Pan’s Labyrinth (2006) “exists because of Bob’s faith,” and Christopher Nolan, who has said that Berney’s championing of Memento (2000) and his efforts to bring the film to the Sundance Film Festival were instrumental in its success. At Newmarket Films, where he served as president and partner, Berney was responsible for the acquisition, marketing, and distribution of Niki Caro’s breakout Whale Rider (2002) and Patty Jenkins’ feature debut, Monster (2003).

Berney has guided the release of many notable independent films, including Manchester by the Sea, My Big Fat Greek Wedding, The Passion of the Christ, Insidious, and Drive. The films he has been associated with have won multiple Academy Awards and grossed more than $1 billion at the North American box office.

== Early years ==
Berney studied film history and production at the University of Texas at Austin. Before graduating with a B.A. in communications, he was a manager and projectionist for AMC Theatres. Berney continued working for the theater chain until he left to renovate the Inwood Theatre in Dallas, which he and his partners reopened as an arthouse venue in 1984. After gaining this experience, he served as a distribution executive for companies including FilmDallas (Kiss of the Spider Woman), Triton Pictures (A Brief History of Time and Hearts of Darkness), and Orion Classics (Theremin: An Electronic Odyssey, Prisoner of the Mountains, and Ulee's Gold). Berney released Todd Solondz’s Happiness under the Good Machine Releasing banner and Christopher Nolan’s Memento under the Newmarket Films banner. The success of the latter film led to the formation of Newmarket Films as a theatrical distribution company.

== 2000 to 2005 ==
In October 2000, Berney became SVP, Marketing & Distribution at IFC Films, starting his tenure with the company in Los Angeles before moving to New York in 2001. Films acquired and theatrically released included Y Tu Mama Tambien, The Safety of Objects, and My Big Fat Greek Wedding. In 2002, Berney founded Newmarket Films’ theatrical distribution division with Newmarket Capital Group owners Will Tyrer and Chris Ball. Their releases included Real Women Have Curves, Whale Rider, Monster and The Passion of the Christ.

== Initial tenure with Picturehouse ==
In 2005 Berney was hired to launch Picturehouse, a joint venture created by Time Warner subsidiaries New Line Cinema and HBO Films with the mandate to acquire, produce and distribute independent films. In its first two years of existence the company released features such as Robert Altman’s A Prairie Home Companion, starring Meryl Streep and Lily Tomlin; Guillermo del Toro’s Pan’s Labyrinth, which tallied six Oscar nominations and won in three categories; La Vie En Rose, which garnered Marion Cotillard an Oscar for Best Actress; and Sergei Bodrov’s Genghis Khan biopic Mongol, an Oscar nominee for Best Foreign Language Film.

== 2009 to 2012 ==
Berney and producer/financier Bill Pohlad formed Apparition in August 2009. The company's projects included Bright Star, The Runaways and The Young Victoria. Next, Berney formed FilmDistrict with Graham King and Tim Headington of GK Films and released Insidious, Soul Surfer, Drive, Don't Be Afraid of the Dark, The Rum Diary and In the Land of Blood and Honey, Angelina Jolie’s directorial debut.

== Reopening Picturehouse ==
In 2013, Berney and his wife Jeanne took ownership of Picturehouse and relaunched the label as an independent theatrical distributor. That same year they released Nimród Antal's Metallica Through the Never, a Grammy Award nominee for Best Music Film. The company's other initial releases included Adriana Trigiani’s Big Stone Gap, starring Ashley Judd, and Christian Keller's Gloria, with Sofía Espinosa.

== Amazon Studios ==
Berney joined Amazon Studios in 2015 as head of marketing and distribution. There he built and oversaw the company's theatrical distribution arm and oversaw the release of more than 50 films including double Academy Award winner Manchester by the Sea (the first Oscar nominee for Best Picture released by a streaming platform), The Big Sick (Oscar nominee, Best Original Screenplay), Cold War (nominated for three Oscars, including Best Director) and The Salesman (Oscar winner, Best Foreign Language Film).

== 2020s ==
After starting the decade with the release of Fatima, a historical drama directed by Marco Pontecorvo, Picturehouse released a series of notable films beginning with Liz Garbus’ documentary Becoming Cousteau. The film, which explored the life and career of oceanographer and filmmaker Jacques-Yves Cousteau, won Best Science/Nature Documentary at the 2021 Critics’ Choice Documentary Awards and Best Documentary at the 2022 British Academy Film Awards. Alex Pritz’s 2022 film The Territory, about Indigenous resistance to deforestation in Brazil, was shortlisted for Best Documentary Feature at the 95th Academy Awards and won the award for Exceptional Merit in Documentary Filmmaking at the 75th Emmy Awards. 2024’s Porcelain War, directed by Brendan Bellomo and Slava Leontyev, profiled Ukrainian artists facing the Russian occupation of their country. It won the U.S. Documentary Competition Grand Jury Prize at Sundance and was nominated for an Oscar in the Best Documentary Feature Film category in 2025.

== Selected filmography ==
- Porcelain War (2024)
- The Territory (2022)
- Becoming Cousteau (2021)
- Fatima (2020)
- Cold War (2018)
- The Big Sick (2017)
- The Salesman (2016)
- Manchester by the Sea (2016)
- Gloria (2014)
- Big Stone Gap (2014)
- Metallica Through the Never (2013)
- Insidious (2011)
- Soul Surfer (2011)
- Drive (2011)
- The Rum Diary (2011)
- In the Land of Blood and Honey (2011)
- Don't Be Afraid of the Dark (2011)
- The Runaways (2010)
- Bright Star (2009)
- The Young Victoria (2009)
- Mongol (2008)
- Kit Kittredge: An American Girl (2008)
- The Orphanage (2007)
- The King of Kong: A Fistful of Quarters (2007)
- La Vie En Rose (2007)
- Pan’s Labyrinth (2006)
- A Prairie Home Companion (2006)
- The Passion of the Christ (2004)
- Monster (2003)
- Whale Rider (2003)
- Real Women Have Curves (2002)
- My Big Fat Greek Wedding (2002)
- Y Tu Mama Tambien (2002)
- Memento (2001)
- Happiness (1998)
- A Brief History of Time (1992)
- Prisoner of the Mountains (1997)
- Ulee's Gold (1997)
- Theremin: An Electronic Odyssey (1993)
- Hearts of Darkness (1991)
- Kiss of the Spider Woman (1985)
