= Harvest of Corruption =

2010 book by Frank Ogodo Ogbeche

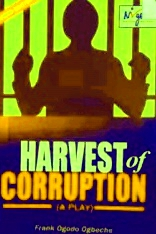
- Author: Frank Ogodo Ogbeche
- Language: English
- Genre: Fiction
- Publisher: Almaz Books Limited
- Publication date: 5 Apr 2010
- Publication place: Nigeria
- ISBN: 978-9-780-68441-9

Harvest of Corruption is a book by Frank Ogodo Ogbeche. The play centers on corrupt government system, witnessing a web of deceit, bribery, and moral decay. Aloho, desperate for employment, falls prey to Ochuole's promises, leading her into a job within the Ministry of External Relations under the notorious Chief Haladu Ade-Amaka. As the story unfolds, we see the pervasive corruption infecting even law enforcement, with characters like ACP Yakubu grappling with the idea of madness ruling a nation plagued by societal scandal. Aloho's involvement in drug trafficking and her secret affair with Chief Haladu unfold, leading to her pregnancy and subsequent tragic demise during childbirth. Ogeyi, Aloho's friend, becomes a crucial informant to ACP Yakubu, seeking justice for Aloho's death and bringing down the corrupt officials, resulting in a courtroom climax where justice is served.

== Plot ==
=== Scene one ===
The drama opens significantly with the Ministry of External Relations, where fate reunites Aloho and Ochuole, acquaintances from their university days. Aloho, burdened by her fruitless job search since completing her service, confides in Ochuole, who vows to assist her in securing employment. Excitedly, Aloho shares this news with her roommate and friend, Ogeyi, only to be met with caution due to Ochuole's questionable reputation. Despite Ogeyi's warnings, Aloho remains determined to accept Ochuole's offer.

Later that same day, Ochuole leverages her connections and discusses Aloho's predicament with Chief Haladu Ade-Amaka, the influential minister of external relations, during their customary rendezvous at Madam Hoha's Akpara Hotel.

=== Scene two ===
Chief Haladu Ade-Amaka, the minister of external relations, pays a casual visit to the police headquarters to greet the commissioner of police. During their conversation, the commissioner expresses concerns about the increasing prevalence of illicit activities within the ministry. However, these concerns are quickly allayed when the commissioner is presented with a significant sum of money by Chief. In exchange for continuous financial incentives and the promise of non-interference with his illegal activities, Chief assures the commissioner of police of ongoing financial benefits and even hints at securing him the position of inspector-general.

Meanwhile, in another part of the police headquarters, Assistant Commissioner of Police (ACP) Yakubu reflects on the rampant bribery and corruption plaguing the nation. His thoughts are interrupted by the appearance of a seemingly deranged man, known as Show boy, whose unconventional ramblings surprisingly resonate with ACP Yakubu's own observations about society. Inspired by the madman's unconventional perspective, ACP Yakubu suggests that perhaps allowing the "insane" to govern might be a solution, considering the apparent lack of moral integrity among the so-called sane populace.

Elsewhere, Inspector Inaku, potentially acting on ACP Yakubu's instructions, approaches Ayo, a Clerical Assistant in the Ministry of External Relations, with probing questions. Initially resistant, Ayo relents when offered a bribe of two thousand naira by Inspector Inaku.

In another instance, Chief pays a visit to Justice Odili, the chief judge, under the guise of paying respects. In customary fashion, Chief offers Justice Odili a substantial sum of money and kola nuts in exchange for the protection and immunity he receives.

=== Scene three ===
Aloho, accompanied by her friend Ochuole, is introduced to Chief Haladu Ade-Amaka, the Honourable Minister of External Relations, who offers her a position as one of his protocol officers. Despite Ogeyi's warnings about Ochuole's dubious connections, Aloho remains undeterred in accepting the job. She is informed of an upcoming trip to the United States to deliver important documents for the Minister, disregarding Ogeyi's advice to distance herself from Ochuole and the job.

However, upon her departure, Aloho is detained at the airport after substances believed to be narcotics are found in her possession. Despite this setback, Chief Haladu Ade-Amaka intervenes and offers Justice Odili a substantial sum of one million naira, leading to Aloho's discharge and acquittal due to lack of evidence.

Meanwhile, Assistant Commissioner of Police Yakubu is shocked by the developments and resolves to continue his investigation into the embezzlement of a staggering sum of one point two billion naira within the Ministry of External Relations under Chief Haladu Ade-Amaka's leadership.

=== Scene four ===
Aloho, overcome with despair, finds herself in tears, wishing for death as she recounts the ordeal she endured at the hands of Chief Haladu Ade-Amaka, including a secret relationship with him prior to obtaining her job. She reveals to Ogeyi, who is taken aback by the revelation, that she is pregnant as a result of this liaison. Despite Aloho's initial inclination towards terminating the pregnancy, Ogeyi opposes this idea.

Meanwhile, ACP Yakubu expresses his determination to his superior, the Commissioner of Police, to launch an investigation into the embezzlement scandal involving a staggering sum of one point two billion naira within the Ministry of External Relations, along with other associated crimes. Despite the Commissioner's disapproval, ACP Yakubu remains resolute in his decision.

=== Scene five ===
Aloho, seeking guidance from a medical professional at Wazobia Hospital regarding her situation, encounters a complex moral dilemma. Despite initial resistance from the doctor regarding the procedure's legality, she finds herself in a challenging situation where her desperation leads her to offer a bribe, which the doctor reluctantly accepts. However, before the procedure can proceed, an unexpected interruption by Nurse Halimatu Amidu prevents its completion.

In the midst of this turmoil, Aloho confides in her friend Ogeyi about her haunting nightmares and inner conflict regarding the decision she's contemplating. Ogeyi, offering support and perspective, urges Aloho to reconsider her choice, emphasizing the importance of facing challenges with strength and resilience rather than succumbing to impulsive actions.

Ultimately, the intervention at the hospital serves as a turning point for Aloho, prompting her to reflect on the gravity of her decision and the potential consequences. Despite her initial disappointment and frustration, this experience offers her an opportunity for introspection and perhaps a chance to seek alternative solutions or support systems to navigate her circumstances.

=== Scene six ===
Ogeyi rushes to Assistant Commissioner of Police, ACP Yakubu, bearing crucial information about the misconduct of Minister of External Relations, Hon. Haladu Ade-Amaka. She details the Minister's involvement in her friend's drug trafficking, his abuse of power to secure her friend's exoneration, and his reprehensible act of impregnating her friend. With tears in her eyes, Ogeyi pleads for ACP Yakubu's intervention, fearing for her friend Aloho's life as she seeks an abortion, which could have dire consequences. She implores them to take action swiftly to prevent further harm, expressing her willingness to testify as a witness whenever necessary.

Grateful for Ogeyi's bravery in coming forward, ACP Yakubu and his team recognize the significance of the information she provides. They decide to escalate the matter by forwarding the recorded testimony on a cassette to the Presidency, urging immediate investigation by the State Security Service (SSS). This decisive action reflects their commitment to upholding justice and holding those in positions of power accountable for their actions.

=== Scene seven ===
Despite Aloho's futile attempts to terminate her pregnancy, she ultimately decides to seek solace and support from her parents, following Ogeyi's advice. However, their plans are disrupted when the State Security Service intervenes, apprehending Chief Haladu Ade-Amaka, Ochuole, and Ayo from the Ministry of External Relations. Meanwhile, Ogeyi is visited by Okpotu, Aloho's younger brother, who delivers the heartbreaking news of Aloho's demise during childbirth. He reveals that Aloho gave birth to a baby girl before dying and that their father wants to know the child's father. Shocked and overwhelmed, Ogeyi vows to seek justice for Aloho's death and ensure that the responsible party faces consequences, all while grappling with her grief.

=== Scene eight ===
Chief Haladu-Ade-Amaka and his associates, including the commissioner of police, the Chief Judge, Justice Odili, the clerical assistant Mr. Ayo, Ochuole, and the proprietress of Akpara Hotel, Madam Hoha, face charges of bribery and corruption brought by the state. Despite the defense counsel's efforts to secure their acquittal, they are unable to escape the consequences of their actions. The courtroom serves as a stage where the repercussions of their corrupt deeds unfold. Chief Haladu-Ade-Amaka is sentenced to twenty-five years in prison, while the commissioner of police and the Chief Justice receive twenty years each. Madam Hoha is sentenced to ten years, Ochuole and Mr. Ayo receive ten years and five years respectively. As the judge brings down his gavel, signifying the end of the trial, law enforcement officers escort the convicted individuals out of the courtroom to begin serving their sentences, marking a decisive moment in the fight against corruption.

== Characters ==
- Aloho: A young woman burdened by unemployment after completing her national service. She is optimistic but naive, easily swayed by promises of assistance. She accepts a job offer from Chief Haladu Ade-Amaka without considering the consequences, ultimately becoming entangled in a web of corruption and deceit.
- Ochuole: Aloho's old acquaintance from university, known for her dubious connections. She promises to help Aloho secure a job through her network but is viewed with suspicion by Aloho's friend, Ogeyi, due to her questionable reputation.
- Ogeyi: Aloho's roommate and friend, who is more cautious and skeptical of Ochuole's intentions. She warns Aloho against trusting Ochuole and advises her to be careful, but Aloho disregards her concerns.
- Chief Haladu Ade-Amaka: The influential Minister of External Relations who exploits his power for personal gain. He offers Aloho a job but later manipulates her and covers up her involvement in drug trafficking. He is ultimately exposed and sentenced to prison for bribery and corruption.
- Commissioner of Police: Initially concerned about corruption within the ministry, he is bribed by Chief Haladu Ade-Amaka to turn a blind eye to illegal activities. He faces consequences for his involvement when the corruption scandal is uncovered.
- Assistant Commissioner of Police (ACP) Yakubu: A principled police officer who becomes determined to investigate the corruption within the Ministry of External Relations. He is inspired by unconventional perspectives and seeks justice despite opposition from his superiors.
- Show boy: A seemingly deranged individual whose unconventional ramblings resonate with ACP Yakubu's observations about society. His appearance sparks a discussion about the possibility of allowing the "insane" to govern.
- Inspector Inaku: Acts on ACP Yakubu's instructions to investigate corruption within the ministry. He offers bribes to individuals to gather information, demonstrating the widespread nature of corruption within the system.
- Justice Odili: The Chief Judge who is bribed by Chief Haladu Ade-Amaka for protection and immunity. He faces consequences when the corruption scandal is exposed, receiving a lengthy prison sentence.
- Ayo: A Clerical Assistant in the Ministry of External Relations who accepts bribes from Inspector Inaku. He is implicated in the corruption scandal and sentenced to prison.Madam Hoha: The proprietress of Akpara Hotel, where Chief Haladu Ade-Amaka conducts his illicit activities. She is sentenced to prison for her involvement in bribery and corruption.
- Nurse Halimatu Amidu: Unexpectedly interrupts Aloho's attempt to seek an abortion, preventing the procedure from being completed. Her intervention prompts Aloho to reconsider her decision and seek alternative solutions.
- Okpotu: Aloho's younger brother who delivers the news of her death during childbirth to Ogeyi. His visit adds to the tragedy surrounding Aloho's life and prompts Ogeyi to seek justice for her friend.
