= ...So Goes the Nation =

- Theatrical poster
- Directed by: Adam Del Deo; James D. Stern
- Produced by: Jun Diaz; Douglas Hansen; Don Kempf
- Distributed by: IFC Films
- Release date: October 4, 2006
- Running time: 90 minutes
- Country: United States
- Language: English
- Box office: $10,337

...So Goes the Nation is a 2006 political documentary directed by Adam Del Deo and James D. Stern that follows the 2004 United States presidential election between Republican President George W. Bush and Democratic Senator John Kerry. It was released by IFC Films on October 4, 2006, and received praise from critics. The documentary concentrates on the swing state of Ohio, where Bush's victory in the state was considered to cost Kerry the election. It features interviews with both campaign officials and volunteers from both parties while analyzing the outcome of the election. ...So Goes the Nation documents Ohio's rural-urban political divide, and the corresponding cultural and moral issues that, according to the documentary, played a pivotal role in the election's outcome.

== Background ==
In the 2004 United States presidential election, Republican incumbents George W. Bush and Dick Cheney were challenged by Democratic Senators John Kerry of Massachusetts and John Edwards of North Carolina. During the election, Ohio was considered a crucial battleground state; following Kerry's loss in Ohio he called Bush to concede the election.

== Synopsis ==
The documentary concentrates on the 2004 United States presidential election in the swing state of Ohio. The state was considered highly competitive, with both candidates attempting to win it. Due to Bush's victory in Ohio, Kerry conceded the election. The film features interviews with campaign officials, including the chairs of both the Democratic National Committee and Republican National Committee, and volunteers from both parties, while analyzing the outcome of the election. It also covers the political differences between Ohio's rural and urban communities, along with their cultural and moral differences and their impact on the electorate.

== Production ==
County map of the 2004 election in Ohio: Bush 50–60% 60–70% 70–80% / Kerry 50–60% 60–70%

...So Goes the Nation was co-directed by Adam Del Deo and James D. Stern; it was the third to be directed by the pair. Two weeks before election day, following an announcement about new rules regarding voter registration by Kenneth Blackwell, the Ohio Secretary of State, Del Deo and Stern traveled across the state with the initial goal of documenting possible voter fraud in the 2004 presidential election. However, they instead decided to cover the Bush and Kerry campaigns. ...So Goes the Nation takes its name from the saying "As Ohio goes, so goes the nation", a reference to the fact that every single winning candidate from Lyndon B. Johnson in the 1964 presidential election through Donald Trump in the 2016 presidential election carried Ohio.

The documentary featured various officials from both campaigns, including Terry McAuliffe and Ed Gillespie, the chairmen of the Democratic and Republican national committees, respectively. It also features Leslie Ghiz, a Republican activist and judge on the Hamilton County Common Pleas Court who campaigned for the Bush/Cheney ticket. Ghiz later left the Republican Party due to the influence of President Donald Trump.

== Release and reception ==
...So Goes the Nation was simultaneously released by IFC Films on October 4, 2006, on both cable television and in theatres. The film was released in the lead up to the 2006 midterm elections. Its theatrical run was limited to four theaters for less than a month. The film made $2,622 in its opening weekend and $10,337 overall. On November 1, to promote the film, Stern and Del Deo were interviewed by Brian Lamb on C-SPAN. On February 13, 2007, it was released on DVD.

The documentary received generally positive reviews from critics. On the review aggregator website Rotten Tomatoes, 91% of 23 critics' reviews are positive, with an average rating of 7/10. The website's consensus reads: "Intelligent and even-handed, ...So Goes the Nation takes an impressively comprehensive look behind the scenes of the modern American election process." Metacritic, which uses a weighted average, assigned the film a score of 65 out of 100, based on 12 critics, indicating "generally favorable" reviews. Writing for The New York Times, Jeannette Catsoulis praised the film, writing that the Democrats should view the film as "less as the opening of an old wound and more as a manual for 2008." Writing for Variety, Ronnie Scheib praised the film's use of humor, particularly noting the jokes made by the political consultant Paul Begala, but found it somewhat boring overall. Writing for The Boston Globe, Wesley Morris felt the movie stood out among political dramas due to its nonpartisan approach to its subject, giving the film a rating of 3/4 stars. He also praised how the film paired Bush's attacks on Kerry as a "flip flopper" with clips of Kerry changing his positions, calling the montage a "cruel thing of beauty." Writing for The Blade, a newspaper based in Toledo, Ohio, Rob Lockwood praised the film's understanding of the politics of Ohio while admitting the setting was mostly irrelevant to the overarching narrative. He rated the documentary 4/5 stars. However, not all critics enjoyed the film, both Michael Wilmington of Chicago Tribune and Jack Mathews of New York Daily News gave the documentary negative reviews.

== See also ==
- Unprecedented: The 2000 Presidential Election, a documentary which covered the 2000 United States presidential election in the battleground state of Florida
