= Independent Film Company =

American film distribution company

- Logo used since 2025
- Formerly: IFC Films (2000–2025)
- Type: Subsidiary
- Industry: Motion pictures
- Predecessor: Next Wave Films; IFC Productions; Agenda 2000
- Founded: September 26, 2000; 25 years ago
- Headquarters: New York, New York, United States
- Key people: Jonathan Sehring (president, 2007)
- Owner: AMC Global Media
- Parent: IFC Entertainment Group
- Divisions: IFC Productions; IFC First Take; IFC Midnight; Sundance Selects
- Website: independentfilmco.com

Independent Film Company (formerly IFC Films) is an American film production and distribution company owned by AMC Global Media and based in New York. An offshoot of cable channel IFC, the company mainly distributes independent features under its own name, and select foreign films, and documentaries under its Sundance Selects label.

Independent Film Company is part of the IFC Entertainment Group (formerly AMC Networks Entertainment Group), which also includes the IFC Center, and streaming service Shudder.

== History ==
=== Background ===
The Independent Film Channel (IFC) first ventured into motion pictures in 1997 with their film distribution label, Next Wave Films. The label helped fund "no-budget" movies, with Christopher Nolan‘s first feature, Following, and the Academy Award-nominated documentary Sound and Fury being notable titles. Next Wave Films was shut down in 2002 and folded into IFC. IFC also launched a film company, IFC Productions, which set up operation in March 1997 to produce their own feature film projects. In January 1999, IFC launched a film production label called Agenda 2000, which set up their own film projects, which had their world premiere on the IFC.

=== Founding and early years ===
In September 2000, IFC launched its own feature film unit, branded IFC Films, to be headed by Bob Berney, who also served as a consultant for the launch of Newmarket Films and would later be the founder of Picturehouse in 2019.

IFC has several ventures in video on demand (VOD), available through cable television pay-per-view, Apple iTunes, and formerly Blockbuster's Movielink. In 2002, IFC Films struck a deal with MGM Home Entertainment to release its theatrical films to home video on DVD and VHS. In 2005, following MGM's purchase by Sony Pictures, IFC moved to Sony Pictures Home Entertainment for a short while, until they along with IFC's original TV shows moved to Genius Products in 2006 as part of a deal signed by Rainbow Media.

Logo as IFC Films, used from 2000 to 2025

In 2006, IFC launched IFC First Take, combining a limited theatrical release with video on demand being available the same day. The films included would be shown at IFC owned IFC Center, as well as other theaters; Landmark Theatres were the first outside theaters announced. That same year, IFC Films began distributing some films to Apple iTunes. The first batch were thirteen IFC films with nominations in the Film Independent Spirit Awards. In October 2008, Arianna Bocco joined IFC, as VP of acquisitions and production, to spearhead the acquisition of 24 films a year for the IFC First Take banner, IFC’s day-and-date division. That same year, IFC launched IFC Festival Direct, a platform for video on demand distribution, for films without a slated theatrical release in the United States. In 2010, it was announced that IFC Films would be launching a division titled IFC Midnight, which would focus on releasing horror, sci-fi, thrillers, erotic arthouse, and action.

In 2009, IFC signed home video deals with MPI Media Group, known primarily for disc releases of classic U.S. and British television titles, documentaries and a Dark Sky line of horror pics, and the Criterion Collection, one of the leading boutique Blu-Ray labels.

In 2010, IFC introduced a new tagline: "Always On. Slightly Off." By 2014, the IFC network would have a major facelift, shifting its programming from independent films to comedy programs, as well as phasing out the full "Independent Film Channel" name entirely. Still, IFC Films kept its focus toward independent films.

In February 2015, Shout! Factory made a deal with IFC Films to release their titles on their IFC Midnight label. This included the Blu-ray and DVD releases of The Babadook (2014) and the Vicious Brothers' Extraterrestrial (2014), among others.

In May 2015, IFC Films struck another home video distribution deal with Paramount Home Entertainment. Some titles included in the deal were The D Train (2015), Clouds of Sils Maria (2015), Good Kill (2014), and Sleeping with Other People (2014).

In July 2018, AMC Networks reached a definitive agreement to acquire RLJ Entertainment, where AMC would pay $65 million for the remaining RLJE shares not owned by AMC or Robert L. Johnson. The transaction was approved by RLJ Entertainment's stockholders on October 31, and AMC Networks completed the acquisition on November 1. RLJ Entertainment became a privately owned subsidiary of AMC Networks, with Johnson and his affiliates owning a 17% stake. RLJ Entertainment, as IFC Films' sister company, took over home video distribution of their titles in December 2021.

In April 2022, it was announced that IFC Films had signed a Pay 1 (post-theater window) output deal with AMC+ (AMC Networks' streaming platform). Beginning in May 2022, AMC+ would launch Friday night movie night, featuring a new movie direct from theaters, every Friday, from IFC Films, IFC Midnight, RLJE Films, and Shudder.

=== Rebrand ===
In May 2025, IFC Films, which was turning 25 years old, announced that it would rebrand as the Independent Film Company, a name that holds the IFC backronym. The company's parent group would also change its name from AMC Networks Entertainment Group to the IFC Entertainment Group. Independent Film Company unveiled a new logo, alongside an on-screen logo animation featuring music composed by Adam "Ad-Rock" Horovitz of Beastie Boys.

In August 2025, it was announced that IFC had acquired the North American rights to Charlie Polinger's directorial debut, The Plague, a psychological thriller starring Joel Edgerton alongside newcomers Everett Blunck, Kayo Martin, and Kenny Rasmussen. The film earned rave reviews and an 11-minute standing ovation when it premiered at the 2025 Cannes Film Festival.

In January 2026, IFC and Shudder acquired the rights to Saccharine, an Australian, supernatural body horror, that premiered at the Sundance Film Festival.

In May 2026, IFC and Sapan Studio acquired the rights to Mouse, an American coming-of-age drama that premiered at the 76th Berlin International Film Festival.

== See also ==
- Scream Factory
- Midnite Movies
