= The Year of the Yao =

- Directed by: Adam Del Deo; James D. Stern
- Produced by: Adam Del Deo
- Starring: Yao Ming
- Music by: James L. Venable
- Production companies: Endgame Entertainment; NBA Entertainment
- Distributed by: Fine Line Features
- Release dates: September 16, 2004 (TIFF); April 15, 2005
- Running time: 88 minutes
- Country: United States
- Languages: English; Mandarin
- Box office: $38,585

The Year of the Yao is a 2004 American documentary film based on basketball player Yao Ming's first year in the United States. The film is narrated by his friend and former interpreter Colin Pine, who stayed with Yao during Yao's rookie year, and interpreted for him for three years.

The film made its world premiere at the Toronto International Film Festival on September 16, 2004, and was theatrically released by Fine Line Features in the United States on April 15, 2005. The film received generally positive reviews from critics.

== Reception ==
=== Box office ===
The Year of the Yao had a limited theatrical release in the United States, Australia and Taiwan. The film grossed $38,585 during its theatrical run.

=== Critical reception ===
On Rotten Tomatoes, the film has an approval rating of 67% based on 33 reviews, with an average rating of 6.30/10. The site's critical consensus reads, "This sports bio documentary is given a few fresh angles, including culture clash issues, and the friendship that develops between Yao and his interpreter." On Metacritic, the film has a score of 62 out of 100 based on 11 critics, indicating "generally favorable reviews".

== See also ==
- List of basketball films
