= FilmDistrict =

Former independent motion picture company

FilmDistrict Distribution, LLC
- Wordmark used until September 23, 2014
- Type: Private
- Industry: Film
- Founded: August 30, 2010; 15 years ago
- Founder: Graham King; Timothy Headington; Peter Schlessel; Bob Berney
- Defunct: September 23, 2014; 11 years ago
- Fate: Merged into Focus Features; Library acquired by Content Partners LLC
- Headquarters: 1801 Century Park East Los Angeles, California, USA
- Key people: Peter Schlessel (CEO); Adrian Alperovich (COO); Christine Birch (President of Marketing); Jim Orr (President of Distribution); Lia Buman (EVP of Acquisitions); Bob Berney (President of Theatrical Distribution); Clark Lewis (Film Executive); Michael Harper (Film Executive Assistant)
- Products: Motion pictures
- Services: Film distribution Film financing
- Number of employees: 45

FilmDistrict Distribution, LLC was an American independent motion picture company based in Los Angeles. It specialized in acquisitions, distribution, short film production, and financing. It was founded on August 30, 2010 by Bob Berney and Peter Schlessel in partnership with Graham King and Timothy Headington. The production and film financing operations of FilmDistrict were discontinued and have been managed by Focus Features since 2014. What remains of Film District Distribution today is its independent film agency specializing in acquisitions and film adaptations.

FilmDistrict's releases were distributed by Sony Pictures Home Entertainment for home media, with the exception of Red Dawn, which was originally released on home media by MGM Home Entertainment through 20th Century Fox Home Entertainment. FilmDistrict was merged into Focus Features in 2014; rights to its library were acquired by Content Partners LLC in December 2020.

== History ==
FilmDistrict acquired and released between four and eight wide release, commercial titles per year. This includes select titles from GK Films and Sony Pictures Worldwide Acquisitions. In December 2010, FilmDistrict and Netflix signed a Pay-TV deal.

FilmDistrict partnered with TriStar Pictures on select films such as Soul Surfer and Looper. FilmDistrict's CEO Peter Schlessel also made alternative distribution arrangements for their film releases. In 2012, Schlessel closed a three-picture distribution deal for their 2012 films to go through Open Road Films. Open Road released Lockout, the Luc Besson-produced sci-fi action movie that stars Guy Pearce and Maggie Grace, on April 13, 2012. Open Road also released the Red Dawn remake on November 21, 2012. On Open Road's official website they list both the Red Dawn remake and Playing the Field, even though Open Road was never involved in distributing those two films.

On March 23, 2012, Peter Schlessel announced that FilmDistrict hired Christine Birch as President of Marketing as the company rebuilt its distribution team. She worked on The Help, Real Steel and War Horse when she was at DreamWorks. On April 12, 2012, Schlessel announced Jim Orr has joined FilmDistrict as the new President of Distribution. He held similar positions when he was at MGM and Paramount Pictures. At the 2012 Cannes Film Festival, FilmDistrict bought the U.S. rights for romantic thriller Dead Man Down and, from Intrepid Pictures, Oculus. On May 31, 2012, they have hired three new executives: Tracy Pollard (Senior VP of Creative Advertising), Brad Goldberg (Senior VP of Media), and Anna Baxter (Senior VP of Digital Marketing). FilmDistrict also announced that Adrian Alperovich has been promoted from President of Acquisitions and Operations to COO. On June 25, 2012 FilmDistrict announced they have hired Elissa Greer as Senior Vice President of Publicity.

In April 2013, FilmDistrict announced the launch of a unit, High Top Releasing, which "will provide distribution-for-hire services including sales, in-theatre marketing and print control support, film rental negotiation and collection capabilities to independent producers who have the ability to provide their own prints-and-advertising and marketing resources."

On October 2, 2013, it was announced that Peter Schlessel would be replacing James Schamus as CEO of Focus Features effective January 2014, and FilmDistrict was shut down as a distributor. Future FilmDistrict titles would be absorbed and released under Focus Features, the first being That Awkward Moment. FilmDistrict's last film is Paul W. S. Anderson's Pompeii, which the company produced and financed with German-based Constantin Film. TriStar Pictures handled the U.S. distribution.

In 2020, the rights to FilmDistrict's library were purchased by Content Partners, an investment company who also owns Revolution Studios.

== Filmography ==
=== Released ===
Release date	Title	Notes
April 1, 2011	Insidious	FilmDistrict's first release; U.S. co-distribution with Stage 6 Films only; produced by Alliance Films, IM Global and Haunted Movies
April 8, 2011	Soul Surfer	co-distribution outside Europe, Russia and Japan with TriStar Pictures and Affirm Films only; produced by Enticing Entertainment, Island Film Group, Brookwell/McNamara Entertainment, Life's a Beach Entertainment and Mandalay Vision
August 26, 2011	Don't Be Afraid of the Dark	U.S. distribution only; produced by Miramax, Necropia Entertainment and Gran Via Productions
October 7, 2011	Drive	North American distribution only; produced by Bold Films, OddLot Entertainment, Marc Platt Productions and Motel Movies
November 4, 2011	The Rum Diary	U.S. distribution only; produced by GK Films, Infinitum Nihil and FilmEngine
December 2, 2011	In the Land of Blood and Honey	U.S. distribution only; produced by GK Films
April 13, 2012	Lockout	U.S. distribution only; produced by EuropaCorp; theatrically distributed by Open Road Films
June 8, 2012	Safety Not Guaranteed	U.S. distribution only; produced by Big Beach and Duplass Brothers Productions
September 28, 2012	Looper	U.S. co-distribution with TriStar Pictures; produced by Endgame Entertainment and DMG Entertainment
November 21, 2012	Red Dawn	North American distribution only; produced by United Artists (uncredited) and Contrafilm
December 7, 2012	Playing for Keeps	U.S. distribution only; produced by Millennium Films, Misher Films, York Square Productions, Eclectic Pictures, Gerard Butler/Alan Siegel Entertainment and Nu Image
January 25, 2013	Parker	U.S. distribution only; produced by Incentive Filmed Entertainment, Sierra Pictures, Alexander/Mitchell Productions, Current Entertainment, Sidney Kimmel Entertainment and Anvil Films
March 8, 2013	Dead Man Down	U.S. distribution only; produced by IM Global, WWE Studios, Automatik Entertainment, Original Film and Frequency Films
March 22, 2013	Olympus Has Fallen	U.S. distribution only; produced by Millennium Films, Nu Image and Gerard Butler/Alan Siegel Entertainment
April 5, 2013	Evil Dead	co-distribution outside the U.K., Ireland and France with TriStar Pictures only; produced by Ghost House Pictures
September 13, 2013	Insidious: Chapter 2	U.S. distribution only; produced by Stage 6 Films, Entertainment One and Blumhouse Productions
November 27, 2013	Oldboy	U.S. distribution only; produced by Good Universe, Vertigo Entertainment and 40 Acres and a Mule Filmworks
February 21, 2014	Pompeii	U.S. co-distribution with TriStar Pictures only; produced by Constantin Film and Impact Pictures
September 23, 2014	Wer	uncredited; co-production with Sierra Pictures, Incentive Filmed Entertainment, Prototype, and Room 101, Inc.; released by Focus World and Universal Pictures Home Entertainment

=== Films under High Top Releasing ===
Release date	Title	Notes
September 6, 2013	The Ultimate Life	U.S. theatrical distribution only; produced by ReelWorks Studios, LLC
October 18, 2013	I'm in Love with a Church Girl	U.S. theatrical distribution only; produced by RGM NewBreed
April 18, 2014	Make Your Move	U.S. distribution only; produced by CJ Entertainment, SM Entertainment and Robert Cort Productions
September 25, 2015	The Green Inferno	U.S. co-distribution with BH Tilt only; produced by Worldview Entertainment and Dragonfly Entertainment
May 13, 2016	The Darkness	co-distribution with BH Tilt only; produced by Blumhouse Productions and Chapter One Films
December 2, 2016	Incarnate	North American co-distribution with BH Tilt only; produced by IM Global, Blumhouse Productions, WWE Studios, and Maniac Productions
November 18, 2016	The Take	North American distribution only; produced by StudioCanal, Vendôme Pictures and Anonymous Content
