= Warner Bros. Clockwork =

American specialty division of Warner Bros.

- Logo used since 2026
- Type: Division
- Industry: Film
- Predecessor: Fine Line Features; Warner Independent Pictures; Picturehouse (first incarnation)
- Founded: December 18, 2025; 11 months ago
- Founders: Christian Parkes; Jason Wald; Spencer Collantes
- Headquarters: Burbank, California, U.S.
- Key people: Christian Parkes (president); Jason Wald (head of acquisitions and production); Spencer Collantes (vice president, marketing and creative)
- Parent: Warner Bros. Motion Picture Group (2025–2026); Warner Bros. Entertainment (2026–present)
- Website: clockworkwb.com

Warner Bros. Clockwork (or simply Clockwork) is an American independent film distribution and production company that currently serves as the specialty film division of Warner Bros. Entertainment. The label was founded on December 18, 2025, with its name officially revealed at the 2026 CinemaCon on April 14, 2026.

== History ==
As a Time Warner subsidiary, Warner Bros. Entertainment operated three specialty labels during the 2000s: Fine Line Features, Warner Independent Pictures, and Picturehouse. In 2005, Fine Line was folded into Picturehouse, and although all companies had a string of successes, Time Warner's consolidation in 2008 resulted in the studio exiting the specialty business entirely, closing both Picturehouse and Warner Independent that same year. Picturehouse would later be revived in 2013 as a separate entity outside Warner.

On December 12, 2025, it was reported that Christian Parkes, longtime chief marketing officer at independent distributor Neon, resigned from the company. Nearly a week later, it was revealed that Parkes had been hired to start a new "contemporary film label" at Warner Bros. Pictures, and that he would be joined at the label by former Neon colleagues Jason Wald and Spencer Collantes. The then-unnamed label was founded to focus on lower budget films either acquired or made in-house and targeted mainly at "digital natives and Generation Z audiences" with innovative marketing campaigns, and would release two to three titles annually; the label has also been tasked with restoring classic Warner Bros. films.

At the 2026 Sundance Film Festival in January 2026, the new label attempted to make a last minute bid for Olivia Wilde's film The Invite, but A24 ultimately acquired the film. At the 2026 CinemaCon in April 2026, Warner Bros. Motion Picture Group heads Michael De Luca and Pamela Abdy announced that the label would be named Warner Bros. Clockwork, and that it had acquired worldwide rights excluding France to Sean Baker's film titled Ti Amo!, which is set to be released sometime in 2027.

In April 2026, Clockwork's social media accounts made a cryptic post featuring British filmmaker Ken Russell, leading to speculation about a possible reissue of his 1971 film The Devils, a historical psychological drama film that Warner Bros. had repeatedly censored and kept out of circulation for decades since its initial release. The following month, a 4K restoration assembled from the film's original camera negative was confirmed to be premiering under the Clockwork label at the 2026 Cannes Film Festival in the Cannes Classics section; picture and sound restoration was done by Warner Bros. Post Production Creative Services, Water Tower Color, and Warner Bros. Sound. Following its premiere, the restored film re-released in select theaters across the United States and Canada in a week-long engagement starting October 16, 2026.

In May 2026, Clockwork was nearing a deal estimated in the "mid-teen millions" for North American distribution rights to Park Chan-wook's film The Brigands of Rattlecreek.

In July 2026, it was announced that Mary Bronstein's next film Nasty had been set up at Clockwork, with Rose Byrne and Jenna Ortega set as stars and Ortega producing alongside LuckyChap Entertainment.

In September 2026, filmmaker Noah Baumbach left a longtime exclusivity deal with Netflix for a three year first-look deal for theatrical films with the Warner Bros. Motion Picture Group, with the arrangement set to begin from 2027. His first film under this deal is set to be released under the Clockwork label, with Baumbach writing and directing as well as producing alongside David Heyman and LuckyChap Entertainment. In October 2026, the label announced that their slate would also include Sean Penn's upcoming film about the January 6 United States Capitol attack.

== Filmography ==
Release date	Title	Notes
October 16, 2026	The Devils	re-release of 4K restoration; produced by Russo Productions
2027	Nasty	co-production with LuckyChap Entertainment
2027	Ti Amo!	distribution outside France and Russia only; produced by FilmNation Entertainment, Cre Film and Rapt Film
TBA	The Brigands of Rattlecreek	North American distribution only; produced by Moho Film and Wise Owl
TBA	Untitled Noah Baumbach film	co-production with Heyday Films and LuckyChap Entertainment
TBA	Untitled Sean Penn film	co-production with Projected Picture Works

== See also ==
- Warner Independent Pictures
- Fine Line Features
- Picturehouse
