= American Chaos =

- Theatrical release poster
- Directed by: James D. Stern
- Written by: James D. Stern
- Produced by: James D. Stern; Fernando Villena; Christopher C. Chen; Karen Bove
- Starring: James D. Stern
- Cinematography: Kevin Ford
- Edited by: Rose Corr; Kevin Ford
- Music by: Vincent Leslie Jones
- Distributed by: Sony Pictures Classics
- Release date: September 14, 2018
- Running time: 90 minutes
- Country: United States
- Language: English

American Chaos is a 2018 American documentary film about James D. Stern interviewing supporters of Donald Trump before the 2016 United States presidential election. It was directed by Stern.

== Release ==
The film was released on September 14, 2018.

== Reception ==
The film has a 65% rating on Rotten Tomatoes based on 37 reviews. Matt Zoller Seitz of RogerEbert.com awarded the film two stars out of four.

Todd Gilchrist of TheWrap gave the film a negative review and wrote, "Stern’s film basically serves as a chronicle of one liberal’s disbelief and disillusionment as election night dashes all of his ideals about the progress he thought our country had made. Almost two years later, though, who needs or wants to see that?"

Stephen Farber of The Hollywood Reporter gave the film a positive review, calling it "a well made film."
