= 2004 United States presidential election in Ohio =

- November 2, 2004
- Turnout: 71.77% (▲8.04 pp)

| Nominee | George W. Bush | John Kerry |
| Party | Republican | Democratic |
| Home state | Texas | Massachusetts |
| Running mate | Dick Cheney | John Edwards |
| Electoral vote | 20 | 0 |
| Popular vote | 2,859,768 | 2,741,167 |
| Percentage | 50.81% | 48.71% |

Bush
50–60%
60–70%
70–80%
Kerry
50–60%
60–70%
80–90%
President before election
George W. Bush
Republican
Elected President
George W. Bush
Republican

The 2004 United States presidential election in Ohio took place on November 2, 2004, and was part of the 2004 United States presidential election. Voters chose 20 representatives, or electors to the Electoral College, who voted for president and vice president. Ohio was won by incumbent President George W. Bush by a 2.11% margin of victory. Prior to the election, most news organizations considered Ohio as a swing state. The state's economic situation gave hope for John Kerry. In the end, the state became the deciding factor of the entire election. Kerry conceded the state, and the entire election, the morning following election night, as Bush won the state and its 20 electoral votes.

The close contest was the subject of the 2006 documentary film ...So Goes the Nation, the title of which is a reference to Ohio's 2004 status as a crucial swing state. Had Kerry won the state, he would have won the presidency with 272 electoral votes despite losing the popular vote, and would have been the first Democrat to achieve this feat; this also meant that if Bush lost the state, he would have lost re-election with 266 electoral votes, and been a one-term president despite winning the popular vote, which would have made him the first Republican to achieve this feat.

As of the 2024 U.S. presidential election, this is the last time Ohio voted more Democratic than the nation as a whole, as well as the last time where Hamilton County, the home of Cincinnati, voted for a Republican presidential candidate. Bush became the first Republican to win the White House without carrying Stark County since Benjamin Harrison in 1888.

== Primaries ==
- 2004 Ohio Democratic presidential primary

== Campaign ==
=== Predictions ===
There were 12 news organizations that made state-by-state predictions of the election. Here are their last predictions before election day.

| Source | Ranking |
|---|---|
| D.C. Political Report | Lean R |
| Associated Press | Tossup |
| CNN | Lean D (flip) |
| Cook Political Report | Tossup |
| Newsweek | Tossup |
| New York Times | Tossup |
| Rasmussen Reports | Tossup |
| Research 2000 | Tossup |
| Washington Post | Tossup |
| Washington Times | Tossup |
| Zogby International | Tossup |
| Washington Dispatch | Lean D (flip) |

=== Polling ===
Pre-election polling showed a lot of volatility throughout the general election. In September, Bush was gaining momentum here, reaching over 50% in several polls and even reaching double digit margins in some. By October, Kerry gained back momentum as he started winning many of the polls, leading with from 48% to as high as 50%. The last 3 polls averaged Kerry leading 49% to 48%.

=== Fundraising ===
Bush raised $7,349,944, while Kerry raised $3,428,504.

=== Advertising and visits ===
Both candidates campaigned heavily. Bush visited the state 18 times to Kerry's 23 times. Almost every week, over $10 million was spent on television advertising.

== Analysis ==
CNN's exit polling showed that Bush barely won the state. He won with 52% among male voters, while it was tied 50–50 among female voters. 53% of the voters approved of Bush's job as president. Bush dominated in the rural areas, while Kerry dominated and won most of the counties with large populations. Overall, Bush won most of the counties and congressional districts in the state. All the congressional districts Kerry won were in the northern section of the state.

== Results ==
2004 United States presidential election in Ohio
| Party | Candidate | Votes | Percentage | Electoral votes |
|---|---|---|---|---|
| Republican | George W. Bush (incumbent) | 2,859,768 | 50.81% | 20 |
| Democratic | John Kerry | 2,741,167 | 48.71% | 0 |
| Independent | Michael Badnarik | 14,676 | 0.26% | 0 |
| Independent | Michael Peroutka | 11,939 | 0.21% | 0 |
| Others | Others | 358 | 0.01% | 0 |
| Totals | | 5,627,908 | 100.00% | 20 |
| Voter turnout (Voting age population) | | | | 65.3% |

=== By county ===
| County | George W. Bush Republican | | John Kerry Democratic | | Various candidates Other parties | | Margin | | Total |
| County | # | % | # | % | # | % | # | % | Total |
|---|---|---|---|---|---|---|---|---|---|
| Adams | 7,653 | 63.78% | 4,281 | 35.67% | 66 | 0.55% | 3,372 | 28.11% | 12,000 |
| Allen | 32,580 | 66.14% | 16,470 | 33.44% | 206 | 0.42% | 16,110 | 32.70% | 49,256 |
| Ashland | 16,209 | 64.89% | 8,576 | 34.33% | 194 | 0.78% | 7,633 | 30.56% | 24,979 |
| Ashtabula | 21,038 | 46.33% | 24,060 | 52.99% | 309 | 0.68% | -3,022 | -6.66% | 45,407 |
| Athens | 10,847 | 36.10% | 18,998 | 63.23% | 200 | 0.67% | -8,151 | -27.13% | 30,045 |
| Auglaize | 17,016 | 73.87% | 5,903 | 25.63% | 115 | 0.50% | 11,113 | 48.24% | 23,034 |
| Belmont | 15,589 | 46.78% | 17,576 | 52.75% | 157 | 0.47% | -1,987 | -5.97% | 33,322 |
| Brown | 12,647 | 63.58% | 7,140 | 35.89% | 105 | 0.53% | 5,507 | 27.69% | 19,892 |
| Butler | 109,872 | 65.86% | 56,243 | 33.72% | 704 | 0.42% | 53,629 | 32.14% | 166,819 |
| Carroll | 7,695 | 54.53% | 6,300 | 44.64% | 117 | 0.83% | 1,395 | 9.89% | 14,112 |
| Champaign | 11,718 | 62.41% | 6,968 | 37.11% | 90 | 0.48% | 4,750 | 25.30% | 18,776 |
| Clark | 34,941 | 50.78% | 33,535 | 48.74% | 331 | 0.48% | 1,406 | 2.04% | 68,807 |
| Clermont | 62,949 | 70.67% | 25,887 | 29.06% | 243 | 0.27% | 37,062 | 41.61% | 89,079 |
| Clinton | 12,938 | 70.26% | 5,417 | 29.42% | 59 | 0.32% | 7,521 | 40.84% | 18,414 |
| Columbiana | 25,753 | 52.06% | 23,429 | 47.37% | 283 | 0.57% | 2,324 | 4.69% | 49,465 |
| Coshocton | 9,839 | 56.86% | 7,378 | 42.64% | 86 | 0.50% | 2,461 | 14.22% | 17,303 |
| Crawford | 13,885 | 63.69% | 7,773 | 35.65% | 143 | 0.66% | 6,112 | 28.04% | 21,801 |
| Cuyahoga | 221,600 | 32.89% | 448,503 | 66.57% | 3,674 | 0.54% | -226,903 | -33.68% | 673,777 |
| Darke | 18,306 | 69.57% | 7,846 | 29.82% | 161 | 0.61% | 10,460 | 39.75% | 26,313 |
| Defiance | 11,397 | 61.55% | 6,975 | 37.67% | 144 | 0.78% | 4,422 | 23.88% | 18,516 |
| Delaware | 53,143 | 66.05% | 27,048 | 33.62% | 265 | 0.33% | 26,095 | 32.43% | 80,456 |
| Erie | 18,597 | 46.39% | 21,421 | 53.44% | 67 | 0.17% | -2,824 | -7.05% | 40,085 |
| Fairfield | 42,715 | 62.92% | 24,783 | 36.51% | 384 | 0.57% | 17,932 | 26.41% | 67,882 |
| Fayette | 7,376 | 62.74% | 4,334 | 36.86% | 47 | 0.40% | 3,042 | 25.88% | 11,757 |
| Franklin | 237,253 | 45.12% | 285,801 | 54.35% | 2,773 | 0.53% | -48,548 | -9.23% | 525,827 |
| Fulton | 13,640 | 62.13% | 8,224 | 37.46% | 90 | 0.41% | 5,416 | 24.67% | 21,954 |
| Gallia | 8,576 | 61.29% | 5,366 | 38.35% | 51 | 0.36% | 3,210 | 22.94% | 13,993 |
| Geauga | 30,370 | 60.21% | 19,850 | 39.35% | 222 | 0.44% | 10,520 | 20.86% | 50,442 |
| Greene | 48,388 | 61.03% | 30,531 | 38.51% | 363 | 0.46% | 17,847 | 22.52% | 79,282 |
| Guernsey | 9,962 | 55.84% | 7,768 | 43.54% | 110 | 0.62% | 2,194 | 12.30% | 17,840 |
| Hamilton | 222,616 | 52.50% | 199,679 | 47.09% | 1,730 | 0.41% | 22,937 | 5.41% | 424,025 |
| Hancock | 25,105 | 70.48% | 10,352 | 29.06% | 162 | 0.45% | 14,753 | 41.42% | 35,619 |
| Hardin | 8,441 | 63.03% | 4,891 | 36.52% | 60 | 0.45% | 3,550 | 26.51% | 13,392 |
| Harrison | 4,274 | 52.71% | 3,780 | 46.61% | 55 | 0.68% | 494 | 6.10% | 8,109 |
| Henry | 9,902 | 65.55% | 5,111 | 33.84% | 92 | 0.61% | 4,791 | 31.71% | 15,105 |
| Highland | 12,211 | 66.07% | 6,194 | 33.52% | 76 | 0.41% | 6,017 | 32.55% | 18,481 |
| Hocking | 6,936 | 52.55% | 6,175 | 46.78% | 88 | 0.67% | 761 | 5.77% | 13,199 |
| Holmes | 8,468 | 75.47% | 2,697 | 24.02% | 55 | 0.51% | 5,771 | 51.45% | 11,220 |
| Huron | 14,817 | 57.97% | 10,568 | 41.35% | 173 | 0.68% | 4,249 | 16.62% | 25,558 |
| Jackson | 8,585 | 59.89% | 5,700 | 39.77% | 49 | 0.34% | 2,885 | 20.12% | 14,334 |
| Jefferson | 17,185 | 47.25% | 19,024 | 52.30% | 163 | 0.45% | -1,839 | -5.05% | 36,372 |
| Knox | 17,068 | 63.11% | 9,820 | 36.31% | 157 | 0.58% | 7,248 | 26.80% | 27,045 |
| Lake | 62,193 | 51.05% | 59,049 | 48.47% | 581 | 0.48% | 3,144 | 2.58% | 121,823 |
| Lawrence | 15,455 | 55.77% | 12,120 | 43.74% | 135 | 0.49% | 3,335 | 12.03% | 27,710 |
| Licking | 49,016 | 61.72% | 30,053 | 37.84% | 351 | 0.44% | 18,963 | 23.88% | 79,420 |
| Logan | 14,471 | 67.63% | 6,825 | 31.90% | 102 | 0.48% | 7,646 | 35.73% | 21,398 |
| Lorain | 61,203 | 43.49% | 78,970 | 56.11% | 569 | 0.40% | -17,767 | -12.62% | 140,742 |
| Lucas | 87,160 | 39.54% | 132,715 | 60.21% | 555 | 0.25% | -45,555 | -20.67% | 220,430 |
| Madison | 11,117 | 63.90% | 6,203 | 35.65% | 78 | 0.45% | 4,914 | 28.25% | 17,398 |
| Mahoning | 48,761 | 36.69% | 83,194 | 62.60% | 949 | 0.71% | -34,433 | -25.91% | 132,904 |
| Marion | 17,171 | 58.69% | 11,930 | 40.78% | 157 | 0.54% | 5,241 | 17.91% | 29,258 |
| Medina | 48,196 | 56.78% | 36,272 | 42.73% | 410 | 0.49% | 11,924 | 14.05% | 84,878 |
| Meigs | 6,272 | 58.23% | 4,438 | 41.20% | 61 | 0.57% | 1,834 | 17.03% | 10,771 |
| Mercer | 15,650 | 74.92% | 5,118 | 24.50% | 122 | 0.58% | 10,532 | 50.42% | 20,890 |
| Miami | 33,992 | 65.67% | 17,606 | 34.01% | 162 | 0.32% | 16,386 | 31.66% | 51,760 |
| Monroe | 3,424 | 44.30% | 4,243 | 54.90% | 62 | 0.80% | -819 | -10.60% | 7,729 |
| Montgomery | 138,371 | 48.97% | 142,997 | 50.60% | 1,216 | 0.43% | -4,626 | -1.63% | 282,584 |
| Morgan | 3,758 | 56.06% | 2,875 | 42.89% | 70 | 1.04% | 883 | 13.17% | 6,703 |
| Morrow | 10,474 | 64.15% | 5,775 | 35.37% | 79 | 0.48% | 4,699 | 28.78% | 16,328 |
| Muskingum | 22,254 | 57.26% | 16,421 | 42.25% | 191 | 0.49% | 5,833 | 15.01% | 38,866 |
| Noble | 3,841 | 58.73% | 2,654 | 40.58% | 45 | 0.69% | 1,187 | 18.15% | 6,540 |
| Ottawa | 12,073 | 51.91% | 11,118 | 47.80% | 68 | 0.29% | 955 | 4.11% | 23,259 |
| Paulding | 6,206 | 62.82% | 3,610 | 36.54% | 63 | 0.64% | 2,596 | 26.28% | 9,879 |
| Perry | 7,856 | 51.72% | 7,257 | 47.78% | 76 | 0.50% | 599 | 3.94% | 15,189 |
| Pickaway | 14,161 | 61.97% | 8,579 | 37.54% | 112 | 0.49% | 5,582 | 24.43% | 22,852 |
| Pike | 6,520 | 51.84% | 5,989 | 47.63% | 67 | 0.53% | 531 | 4.21% | 12,576 |
| Portage | 35,583 | 46.42% | 40,675 | 53.07% | 389 | 0.51% | -5,092 | -6.65% | 76,647 |
| Preble | 13,734 | 65.01% | 7,274 | 34.43% | 119 | 0.56% | 6,460 | 30.58% | 21,127 |
| Putnam | 14,370 | 76.24% | 4,392 | 23.30% | 87 | 0.46% | 9,978 | 52.94% | 18,849 |
| Richland | 36,872 | 59.62% | 24,638 | 39.84% | 330 | 0.53% | 12,234 | 19.78% | 61,840 |
| Ross | 17,231 | 54.41% | 13,978 | 44.14% | 462 | 1.46% | 3,253 | 10.27% | 31,671 |
| Sandusky | 16,224 | 55.92% | 12,686 | 43.72% | 104 | 0.36% | 3,538 | 12.20% | 29,014 |
| Scioto | 18,259 | 51.87% | 16,827 | 47.80% | 117 | 0.33% | 1,432 | 4.07% | 35,203 |
| Seneca | 15,886 | 58.86% | 10,957 | 40.60% | 148 | 0.55% | 4,929 | 18.26% | 26,991 |
| Shelby | 16,204 | 70.90% | 6,535 | 28.59% | 116 | 0.51% | 9,669 | 42.31% | 22,855 |
| Stark | 92,215 | 48.93% | 95,337 | 50.59% | 907 | 0.48% | -3,122 | -1.66% | 188,459 |
| Summit | 118,558 | 42.91% | 156,587 | 56.67% | 1,175 | 0.42% | -38,029 | -13.76% | 276,320 |
| Trumbull | 40,977 | 37.89% | 66,673 | 61.65% | 495 | 0.46% | -25,696 | -23.76% | 108,145 |
| Tuscarawas | 23,829 | 55.54% | 18,853 | 43.94% | 224 | 0.52% | 4,976 | 11.60% | 42,906 |
| Union | 15,870 | 70.13% | 6,665 | 29.45% | 96 | 0.42% | 9,205 | 40.68% | 22,631 |
| Van Wert | 10,678 | 72.02% | 4,095 | 27.62% | 54 | 0.36% | 6,583 | 44.40% | 14,827 |
| Vinton | 3,249 | 54.82% | 2,651 | 44.70% | 28 | 0.47% | 598 | 10.12% | 5,928 |
| Warren | 68,037 | 72.06% | 26,044 | 27.58% | 341 | 0.36% | 41,993 | 44.48% | 94,422 |
| Washington | 17,532 | 58.02% | 12,538 | 41.49% | 146 | 0.48% | 4,994 | 16.53% | 30,216 |
| Wayne | 31,879 | 61.49% | 19,786 | 38.16% | 183 | 0.35% | 12,093 | 23.33% | 51,848 |
| Williams | 12,040 | 64.60% | 6,481 | 34.77% | 118 | 0.63% | 5,559 | 29.83% | 18,639 |
| Wood | 33,592 | 53.03% | 29,401 | 46.41% | 353 | 0.56% | 4,191 | 6.62% | 63,346 |
| Wyandot | 7,254 | 65.69% | 3,708 | 33.58% | 81 | 0.73% | 3,546 | 32.11% | 11,043 |
| Totals | 2,859,768 | 50.81% | 2,741,167 | 48.71% | 26,973 | 0.48% | 118,601 | 2.10% | 5,627,908 |

==== Counties that flipped from Democratic to Republican ====
- Clark (largest municipality: Springfield)

==== Counties that flipped from Republican to Democratic ====
- Stark (largest municipality: Canton)

=== By congressional district ===
Bush won 13 of 18 congressional districts, including one held by a Democrat.

| District | Bush | Kerry | Representative |
|---|---|---|---|
| 1st | 50% | 49% | Steve Chabot |
| 2nd | 64% | 36% | Rob Portman |
| 2nd | 64% | 36% | Jean Schmidt |
| 3rd | 54% | 45% | Mike Turner |
| 4th | 65% | 34% | Mike Oxley |
| 5th | 61% | 39% | Paul Gillmor |
| 6th | 50% | 49% | Ted Strickland |
| 7th | 57% | 42% | David Hobson |
| 8th | 64% | 35% | John Boehner |
| 9th | 42% | 58% | Marcy Kaptur |
| 10th | 41% | 58% | Dennis Kucinich |
| 11th | 18% | 81% | Stephanie Tubbs Jones |
| 12th | 51% | 48% | Pat Tiberi |
| 13th | 44% | 55% | Sherrod Brown |
| 14th | 53% | 47% | Steven LaTourette |
| 15th | 50% | 49% | Deborah Pryce |
| 16th | 54% | 46% | Ralph Regula |
| 17th | 37% | 63% | Tim Ryan |
| 18th | 57% | 42% | Bob Ney |

== Electors ==
Technically the voters of Ohio cast their ballots for electors: representatives to the Electoral College. Ohio is allocated 20 electors because it has 18 congressional districts and 2 senators. All candidates who appear on the ballot or qualify to receive write-in votes must submit a list of 20 electors, who pledge to vote for their candidate and his or her running mate. Whoever wins the majority of votes in the state is awarded all 20 electoral votes. Their chosen electors then vote for president and vice president. Although electors are pledged to their candidate and running mate, they are not obligated to vote for them. An elector who votes for someone other than his or her candidate is known as a faithless elector. The electors of each state and the District of Columbia met on December 13, 2004, to cast their votes for president and vice president. The Electoral College itself never meets as one body. Instead the electors from each state and the District of Columbia met in their respective capitols. The following were the members of the Electoral College from the state. All 20 were pledged for Bush/Cheney.

1. Spencer R. Raleigh
2. Joyce M. Houck
3. Betty Jo Sherman
4. Gary C. Suhadolnik
5. Randy Law
6. Leslie J. Spaeth
7. David Whipple Johnson
8. Robert S. Frost
9. Alex R. Arshinkoff
10. Phil A. Bowman
11. Jon Allison
12. Katharina Hooper
13. Pernel Jones
14. Henry M. Butch O'Neill
15. William O. Dewitt
16. Karyle Mumper
17. Owen V. Hall
18. Merom Brachman
19. Kirk Schuring
20. Billie Jean Fiore

== Objection to certification of Ohio's electoral votes ==
On January 6, 2005, Senator Barbara Boxer joined Representative Stephanie Tubbs Jones of Ohio in filing a congressional objection to the certification of Ohio's Electoral College votes due to alleged irregularities including disqualification of provisional ballots, alleged misallocation of voting machines, and disproportionately long waits in predominantly African-American communities. Ohio's polling locations and equipment are determined by two Democrats and two Republicans serving on the county's Board of Elections, which ensures that any decision made about polling resources is bipartisan. The Senate voted the objection down 74–1; the House voted the objection down 267–31. At the time, it was only the second congressional objection to an entire U.S. state's electoral delegation in American history; the first instance was in 1877, when all the electors from three Southern states in the 1876 United States presidential election were challenged, and one from Oregon. The third instance was in 2021, when Republicans objected to the certification of the electors from Arizona and Pennsylvania. An objection to a single faithless elector was also filed in 1969.

== See also ==
- Presidency of George W. Bush
- United States presidential elections in Ohio
