= Metallica: Through the Never =

2013 American concert film

- Theatrical release poster
- Directed by: Nimród Antal
- Screenplay by: Nimród Antal; James Hetfield; Lars Ulrich; Kirk Hammett; Robert Trujillo
- Produced by: Charlotte Huggins
- Starring: Dane DeHaan; James Hetfield; Lars Ulrich; Kirk Hammett; Robert Trujillo
- Cinematography: Gyula Pados
- Edited by: Joe Hutshing
- Music by: Metallica
- Production company: Blackened Recordings
- Distributed by: Picturehouse
- Release dates: September 9, 2013 (TIFF); September 27, 2013 (United States)
- Running time: 94 minutes
- Country: United States
- Language: English
- Budget: $32 million
- Box office: $9 million

Metallica: Through the Never is a 2013 American 3D thriller concert film featuring American thrash metal band Metallica. Its title is derived from the song "Through the Never", from the band's self-titled 1991 album. It follows young roadie Trip's (Dane DeHaan) surreal misadventures, intercut with concert footage shot in Vancouver and Edmonton in August 2012.

The movie features no dialogue, bar that of Trip's supervisor and the band – a concept similar to Pink Floyd's movie The Wall and Daft Punk's Interstella 5555. "We've obviously been influenced by some of the great music films of the past – The Song Remains the Same, or what Pink Floyd did with The Wall," said Metallica bassist Robert Trujillo. "But this is pretty unique. It's like a cross between Mad Max and The Twilight Zone." It was the first feature released by the revived incarnation of the Picturehouse marquee, which had been shut down since 2008.

The film received mostly positive reviews from critics, but was a box office bomb grossing only $31.9 million against a $32 million budget.

== Plot ==
Amid aerial footage of Vancouver and BC Place, a radio DJ publicizes Metallica's concert. An overweight heavy-metal fan drives into the empty parking lot, and climbs on the car's hood, whooping and laughing. Trip, a roadie for Metallica, skateboards past the fan and wipes out. He skates into the underground parking lot and down the dressing-room halls, encountering each of the band members. When he gives a brown paper bag to his supervisor, Trip is told to stick around. After standing in the arena, he walks away as the audience files in to Metallica's traditional opener, "Ecstasy of Gold".

The band begins performing, and during "Creeping Death" Trip's boss tells him to bring gas to a stranded truck carrying "something very important". Before driving his van, Trip takes a blue-and-red capsule, before the band begins "For Whom the Bell Tolls".

As Metallica begins "Fuel", Trip drives down deserted streets. Distracted by his map, he runs a red light and sees a bloody hand print on an illuminated sign. He is T-boned, and his van flips, lightning flashing as he leaves, which leads into "Ride the Lightning".

Trip crawls out of the van, peers into the other car and calls to the driver. The driver runs past Trip down the street, "One" beginning to be played. Trip retrieves the gas tank, the map and a doll with a noose around its neck from the van, which "The Memory Remains" is played to. He wanders down a street, and a police horse drags a dead officer across his path. People run past him, ignoring him, followed by police cruisers (one of which is ablaze). Emerging in the middle of a street, Trip realizes he is between a motionless group of rioters and riot police ("Wherever I May Roam"). The rioters then become rowdy, and when the police throw tear gas they swarm over them, the violence intercut with "Cyanide".

A rider in a gas mask on an armored horse charges, wielding a war hammer. He lassos a rioter, hanging him from a streetlamp. Trip throws a brick at the rider, who gives chase. Trip loses the doll, but escapes through a wall of rioters.

He walks down a deserted, littered street, under a dozen bodies hanging from a pedestrian bridge, leading into "...And Justice for All". Trip finds the truck he is looking for in a deserted parking-garage corridor, but the traumatized driver does not notice him. The back of the truck contains a leather bag, which Trip opens; he slumps, speechless, as the band breaks into "Master of Puppets".

He sees a figure waving at him from a distance. The rider approaches the figure, and a group of rioters surge past them. Trip grabs the bag and the can of gas, jumps out of the truck and flees.

When "Battery" starts, Trip is cornered at the end of an alley by the rioters. Trip ties a black bandanna around his mouth, puts up his hood and drops the bag. He douses himself with the gas, sets himself ablaze and charges the rioters, who eventually overwhelm him.

After the band finishes "Nothing Else Matters", Trip wakes up (to "Enter Sandman") on the roof of a building; his lost doll, now animated, approaches the leather bag. As Trip gets up, he is lassoed and pulled onto the rider's horse. He grabs the rider's hammer to free himself and slams the roof with it. Shock waves rumble across the city, shattering glass and the exteriors of surrounding buildings and disintegrating the rider and his horse. The reverberation affects Metallica's concert, cutting the power and knocking down lighting trusses. With a backup generator, the band continues the concert without pyrotechnics and a light show, playing "Hit the Lights".

Trip returns to the deserted stadium with the doll and the bag under his arm. The credits roll to scenes of the band performing "Orion" to the empty stadium. Trip takes a seat; the final shot is of the still-closed leather bag which belonged to Cliff Burton on the Master of Puppets tour.

== Cast ==
- Dane DeHaan as Trip, a roadie and the film's protagonist
- James Hetfield as himself – vocals, rhythm guitar
- Kirk Hammett as himself – lead guitar
- Robert Trujillo as himself – bass
- Lars Ulrich as himself – drums
- Mackenzie Gray as concert manager

== Release ==
The band made a surprise appearance in Detroit at the Orion Music + More Festival under the name Dehaan, after lead actor Dane DeHaan, to promote the film by playing their debut album, Kill 'Em All, in its entirety.

Through the Never made its world premiere at the 2013 Toronto International Film Festival.

The film was released in IMAX theaters across the United States on September 27, 2013, the 27th anniversary of former Metallica bassist Cliff Burton's death, before being rolled out to normal cinemas in 3D the week after (October 4). Hetfield attended the San Francisco premiere at The Metreon.

== Reception ==
=== Critical reception ===
Reviews of the film were positive. The film has an 82% "fresh" rating at Rotten Tomatoes based on sixty-six reviews; the consensus states: "Imaginatively shot and edited, Metallica Through the Never is an electrifying, immersive concert film, though its fictional sequences are slightly less assured."

Peter Travers of Rolling Stone called the film "a full-throttle expression of rock & roll anarchy", and encouraged readers not to understand the plot, but to "live" it.

Peter Rugg of The Village Voice writes that the film is "the most immersive concert film ever."

Tristan Peterson of Metal Obsession gave a mixed review, citing "[The story] may be, in the end, irrelevant but it does deliver on some excellent visuals and atmosphere". However, he praised the individual qualities of both.

Chris Tilly of IGN delivered a positive review as well, stating that it "features several truly incredible live performances that are worth the price of admission alone. Metallica fans will love the music, while everyone else can enjoy the amazing visuals in this unique concert movie."

The film was nominated for a Best Music Film at the 57th Annual Grammy Awards and won a distinguished achievement award from the International 3D & Advanced Imaging Society in the "Motion Picture Documentary" category.

=== Box office ===
Despite praise from critics and the huge popularity of the band, the film was a commercial flop, grossing only $3.4 million domestically.

In 2015, Hetfield expressed his dissatisfaction over the movie's financial failure, describing the whole experience to be "bittersweet." He added, "We really took a giant risk on this. Maybe we should’ve thought a little more about it. Building that stage – there was a lot of money put into that thing. But at the end of the day, it’s on us. It’s our fault! We agreed to it, and there you go. So we’ve learned a lesson.”

== Music ==
The film's official soundtrack was released on September 24, 2013, via Blackened Recordings. It charted in several countries and was nominated for a Best Recording Package Grammy.
