= It's the Rage =

- It's the Rage DVD Cover
- Directed by: James D. Stern
- Written by: Keith Reddin
- Produced by: Peter Gilbert; Anne McCarthy; Ash R. Shaw; James D. Stern; Mary Vernieu
- Starring: Joan Allen; Andre Braugher; Josh Brolin; Jeff Daniels; Robert Forster; Anna Paquin; Giovanni Ribisi; David Schwimmer; Gary Sinise; Bokeem Woodbine
- Cinematography: Alex Nepomniaschy
- Edited by: Tony Lombardo
- Music by: Mark Mothersbaugh
- Production company: Screenland Pictures
- Distributed by: Silver Nitrate Films
- Release date: March 4, 1999
- Running time: 97 minutes
- Country: United States
- Language: English

It's the Rage is a 1999 American drama film adapted from Keith Reddin's play All The Rage. It follows three interconnected stories and shows how handguns affect each of the nine people involved. The film is the directorial debut of producer James D. Stern.

== Plot ==
Handguns figure in the intertwining lives of nine people. Warren (Jeff Daniels) shoots his wife Helen's (Joan Allen) lover and his defense is that he thought he was shooting an intruder. She leaves him and her lawyer (Andre Braugher) helps her find a job working with a nutty, reclusive computer wizard (Gary Sinise) who waves a pistol, sometimes at Helen.

Tennel (Josh Brolin), the computer geek's ex-assistant, lands a video-store job and is smitten by Annabel Lee (Anna Paquin), an aggressive street kid who likes complaining about men to her pistol-packing psychotic brother (Giovanni Ribisi) to set him off. In secret, Annabel starts an affair with the lawyer, but things are complicated when the lawyer's gay lover (David Schwimmer) finds out. Meanwhile, a cop (Robert Forster) stays on Warren's tail.

== Cast ==
- Joan Allen as Helen
- Andre Braugher as Tim
- Josh Brolin as Tennel
- Jeff Daniels as Warren Harding
- Robert Forster as Tyler
- January Jones as Janice Taylor
- Anna Paquin as Annabel Lee
- Giovanni Ribisi as Sidney
- David Schwimmer as Chris
- Gary Sinise as Morgan
- Muse Watson as Cleaner
- Bokeem Woodbine as Agee

== Production ==
Filming was in Los Angeles and the film was first aired on cable television as All the Rage. It never entered wide release in American theaters (showing only at a few select film festivals), although the DVD release has had some mild success. It was shown at the Milan International Film Festival and won awards for Best Acting (Gary Sinise), Best Director, Best Editing, Best Film, Best Music, Best Screenwriting, and the Audience Award.

== Reception ==
Rotten Tomatoes gives the film a critic rating of 27%.
