= Seeking Justice =

Justice
- International teaser poster
- Directed by: Roger Donaldson
- Screenplay by: Robert Tannen
- Story by: Robert Tannen; Todd Hickey
- Produced by: Tobey Maguire; Ram Bergman; James D. Stern
- Starring: Nicolas Cage; January Jones; Harold Perrineau; Jennifer Carpenter; Xander Berkeley; Guy Pearce
- Cinematography: David Tattersall
- Edited by: Jay Cassidy
- Music by: J. Peter Robinson
- Production companies: FilmNation Entertainment; Endgame Entertainment; Material Pictures
- Distributed by: Anchor Bay Films
- Release dates: September 2, 2011 (Italy); November 8, 2011 (UK); March 16, 2012 (U.S.)
- Running time: 105 minutes
- Countries: United States; United Kingdom; Italy
- Language: English
- Budget: $31 million
- Box office: $14 million

Seeking Justice (also known as Justice, and formerly titled The Hungry Rabbit Jumps) is a 2011 action thriller film starring Nicolas Cage, January Jones and Guy Pearce directed by Roger Donaldson and produced by Tobey Maguire, Ram Bergman and James D. Stern. Filming took place in New Orleans. The first trailer was released in September 2011.

== Plot ==
Will Gerard is a humble high school English teacher in New Orleans. His wife Laura is a cellist who plays in a local orchestra. After a performance one evening, Laura is beaten and brutally raped by a stranger named Hodge. Will rushes to the hospital to see Laura. There, a stranger who calls himself Simon tells Will that he represents an organization that deals with criminals who have evaded the justice system, and that Hodge, who had raped three other women before, had been paroled shortly before his attack on Laura. Simon offers to have someone make Hodge pay for Laura's rape, in exchange for a favor from Will to be determined later. A distraught and grief-stricken Will consents to the deal, knowing this will spare Laura a drawn-out trial that would prolong her suffering. That night, Hodge is killed and a picture of Hodge's body, along with a necklace that Hodge took from Laura during the rape, are sent to Will as proof. The organization's code phrase is "The hungry rabbit jumps".

Six months later, Simon returns to ask Will to repay the favor. He wants Will to follow a woman and her two children and to look out for a man named Leon Walczak, whom Simon deems a sex offender. Will initially complies, until Simon demands that Will kill Walczak on a pedestrian walkway under a high overpass, by "accidentally" bumping him off it to his death, making it look like suicide. Will becomes increasingly paranoid and earns a suspension from Jimmy, his best friend and the school's principal, after hitting Edwin, a rebellious student. Fearing retaliation from Simon, Will reluctantly agrees to his demand, but intends to question Walczak about Simon instead of killing him. Walczak, already paranoid and suspicious of Will, attacks him: Will dodges his attacks, causing Walczak to fall to his death.

Will runs home, where Detectives Rudeski and Green arrest him for murdering Walczak, whose name is actually Alan Marsh. At the station, Will fails to convince the detectives of his innocence. Their boss, Lieutenant Durgan, has a private meeting with Will, where he reveals himself as a member of Simon's organization and allows Will to escape, giving him 24 hours to leave the city before Simon comes looking for him. At a memorial for Alan, Will discovers that he was not a sex offender, but actually an award-winning reporter who was investigating the vigilante organization. Will realizes the organization is prepared to kill people who become a threat to its existence. Simon and his henchmen Scar and Cancer arrive and give chase to Will, who escapes as Scar is accidentally killed by a speeding SUV. After Laura finds the necklace that had been returned to Will, he explains to her what is happening and advises her not to cooperate with the police or anyone asking questions.

Will retrieves a DVD from a storage facility that Alan used, which documents Alan's findings about the vigilantes. He learns that Jimmy joined the organization years ago after his brother was murdered and the killer could not be found, and that Simon's real name is Eugene Cook. Will offers Simon to trade the disc with the stolen security camera footage that proves his innocence in Alan's death. They agree to meet at the Louisiana Superdome during a monster truck show.

At the Superdome, Simon reveals he has kidnapped Laura to ensure Will keeps his side of the deal. They go to a nearby abandoned mall, where a bound-and-gagged Laura is being held at gunpoint by Cancer, Jimmy ― who claims he had no choice but to turn Laura in ― and a man named Sideburns. Will gives up the disc, but Simon reneges on the deal and orders both Will and Laura killed to tie all loose ends. Jimmy relents and kills Cancer, whereupon a struggle ensues, where Sideburns dies and Jimmy is fatally shot by Simon, who then loses his gun as Will engages in a fistfight with him. Laura manages to free herself and grabs Simon's gun, which she uses to kill him.

As Will and Laura walk away, Durgan arrives and promises to arrange the crime scene to make it look like they were not present and the dead merely killed each other. The walkway camera footage is released, proving Will acted in self-defense and clearing him of any wrongdoing. With the disc still in hand, Will decides to follow up on Alan's work by giving it to Gibbs, a reporter whom Will met at Alan's memorial. Thanking him, Gibbs says, "The hungry rabbit jumps, eh?", indicating his involvement with the vigilante organization to a surprised Will.

== Cast ==
- Nicolas Cage as Will Gerard
- January Jones as Laura Gerard
- Guy Pearce as Simon/Eugene Cook
- Harold Perrineau as Jimmy
- Jennifer Carpenter as Trudy
- Xander Berkeley as Lieutenant Durgan
- IronE Singleton as Scar
- Wayne Peré as Cancer
- Marcus Lyle Brown as Detective Green
- Dikran Tulaine as Sideburns
- Joe Chrest as Detective Rudeski
- Demetrius Bridges as Edwin
- Jason Davis as Alan Marsh/Leon Walczak
- Alex Van as Hodge
- John McConnell as Clerk
- J. D. Evermore as Elevator Man
- Mike Pniewski as Gibbs
- Cullen Moss as Jones
- Brett Rice as Long
- Kathleen Wilhoite as Mother

== Production ==
In April 2008, it was reported that Endgame Entertainment had acquired The Hungry Rabbit Jumps, a spec script by Robert Tannen described as being a dramatic thriller similar in concept to The Game. Endgame's James D. Stern was set to produce the film alongside Tobey Maguire who at the time was slated to star as the lead character Will Gerard. In September 2009, it was reported that Nicolas Cage would instead play the lead while Maguire would only produce the film with production set to begin at the start of the following year in New Orleans. The following month, January Jones had been cast to star opposite Cage with Roger Donaldson set to direct. In November, Guy Pearce joined the cast.

== Release ==
=== Box office ===
The film opened at #27 at the US box office, taking $249,912 during its first weekend. Seeking Justice has currently grossed $12.4 million worldwide.

=== Critical reception ===
Seeking Justice has received mixed reviews from critics. As of July 2020, the film holds a 28% approval rating on Rotten Tomatoes based on 79 reviews with an average rating of 4.52/10. The consensus states: "Seeking Justice is nothing more than a typical potboiler with another phoned-in performance from Nicolas Cage."

=== Accolades ===
Cage earned a nomination for the Golden Raspberry Award for Worst Actor for his performances in this film and Ghost Rider: Spirit of Vengeance at the 33rd Golden Raspberry Awards.
