= Every Little Step (film) =

- Original poster
- Directed by: James D. Stern; Adam Del Deo
- Produced by: James D. Stern; Adam Del Deo
- Edited by: Brad Fuller; Fernando Villena
- Music by: Jane Antonia Cornish; Marvin Hamlisch
- Distributed by: Sony Pictures Classics
- Release dates: September 6, 2008 (Toronto International Film Festival); April 17, 2009 (United States)
- Running time: 96 minutes
- Country: United States
- Language: English
- Box office: $2,443,479

Every Little Step is a 2008 American documentary film produced and directed by James D. Stern and Adam Del Deo. It follows the process of casting the 2006 Broadway revival of A Chorus Line and explores the history of the award-winning musical, beginning with the informal interviews with Broadway dancers conducted by Michael Bennett that served as its basis. Their personal observations and feelings were captured on audiotape, many of which are heard in this film.

3,000 dancers arrived to audition for the revival on the first day. Some of their stories are interwoven with recollections of members of the original cast, including Donna McKechnie and Baayork Lee; composer Marvin Hamlisch; and Bob Avian, who co-choreographed the original 1975 production and directed the 2006 revival.

The film premiered at the Toronto International Film Festival in September 2008 and went into theatrical release with the title Broadway Broadway in Japan the following month. It was shown at the Berlin International Film Festival, the Thessaloniki Documentary Festival, and the Sarasota Film Festival before going into limited release in the US on April 17, 2009.

== Critical reception ==
On the review aggregator website Rotten Tomatoes, 91% of 94 critics' reviews are positive. The website's consensus reads: "Fascinating and insightful, Every Little Step is a thoroughly engrossing behind the scenes look at Broadway performers." Metacritic, which uses a weighted average, assigned the film a score of 76 out of 100, based on 24 critics, indicating "generally favorable" reviews.

Kaori Shoji of The Japan Times said the film "plays off the echo effect of [its] premise with skill, grace and heartfelt sympathy; it's clearly the work of people who love dancers, whether they're grinning in the spotlight or fighting back tears after a failed tryout . . . [W]hat surfaces in the film is the fierce dedication [dancers] have to their craft and the sense that they're here singing and performing their guts out in front of choreographers and producers because there's no other place on Earth they'd rather be."

A.O. Scott of The New York Times observed, "There is a superficial resemblance between Every Little Step (and, for that matter, A Chorus Line itself) and television reality shows in which ordinary people use their talents to scramble for the spotlight. But those programs are spectacles of amateurism chasing after celebrity, an impulse that could not be further from what Mr. Stern and Mr. Del Deo, taking their cues from Mr. Bennett, set out to honor. The 17 members of that chorus line — and the thousands like them, including those who dream of playing them — are professionals, and one of the names they give to the glory they seek is work. The other is love."

Kenneth Turan of the Los Angeles Times said the film "doesn't do anything unexpected, and it doesn't have to . . . it's a can't-miss effort that knows how to please."

Peter Travers of Rolling Stone rated the film three out of four stars and described it as "a thrilling combination of documentary and musical dazzler" and "a heartbreaker."

Owen Gleiberman of Entertainment Weekly graded the film A, calling it "a movie as layered and as enthralling as its subject."
