= Sony Pictures Home Entertainment =

Home video distribution division of Sony Pictures

Sony Pictures Home Entertainment Inc.
- Logo used since 2004
- Formerly: Columbia Pictures Home Entertainment (1978–1982); RCA/Columbia Pictures International Video (1981–1991); RCA/Columbia Pictures Home Video (1982–1991); Columbia TriStar Home Video (1991–2001); Columbia TriStar Home Entertainment (2001–2004)
- Type: Subsidiary
- Industry: Home entertainment
- Founded: June 1978; 48 years ago, in Burbank, California, United States
- Headquarters: 10202 West Washington Boulevard, Culver City, California, United States
- Area served: Worldwide
- Key people: Mike Wald (co-president); Jason Spivak (co-president)
- Products: DVD, Blu-ray, EST, VOD
- Services: Physical and digital distribution
- Parent: Columbia Pictures (1978–1991); RCA (1982–1986); General Electric (1986–1991); Sony Pictures Entertainment (1991–present)
- Subsidiaries: Sony Pictures Kids Zone
- Website: www.sonypictures.com

Sony Pictures Home Entertainment Inc. (abbreviated as SPHE) is the home entertainment distribution subsidiary of Sony Pictures Entertainment. It was founded in June 1978.

== Background ==
SPHE is responsible for the distribution of the Sony Pictures library for home entertainment, mainly releases from the Sony Pictures Motion Picture Group (Columbia Pictures, TriStar Pictures, Sony Pictures Classics, and Screen Gems) as well as releases from Sony Pictures Worldwide Acquisitions (Triumph Films, Destination Films, Stage 6 Films and Affirm Films) and Crunchyroll, LLC after the latter company's deal with Universal Pictures Home Entertainment as Funimation expired.

SPHE also releases and distributes products from Lionsgate Home Entertainment (since 2021), Walt Disney Studios Home Entertainment (since 2024), and Content Partners LLC (which includes titles from FilmDistrict (now absorbed into Focus Features), Morgan Creek Entertainment, Franchise Pictures and Revolution Studios). Since June 20, 2007, SPHE has handled distribution of children's content formerly handled by Sony BMG's Sony Wonder label.

In Canada, Columbia TriStar Home Video helped distribute tapes from Astral Video in the 1990s. It also has an Australian deal with Hoyts.

== History ==
=== Early history (1978–1991) ===
Sony Pictures Home Entertainment was established in June 1978 as Columbia Pictures Home Entertainment, and released 20 titles in November 1979. Its first 20 titles were licensed and distributed by Time-Life Video, a unit of Time-Life Films, but the relationship didn't last long, and Columbia formed its own distribution arm.

In March 1981, Columbia Pictures established a joint venture with RCA, RCA/Columbia Pictures International Video, to distribute tapes in overseas markets. The partnership expanded to North America as RCA/Columbia Pictures Home Video the following year; this was in part to give RCA's CED videodisc format a steady stream of titles. The venture distributed NBC titles, as it was a subsidiary of RCA at the time. When Tri-Star Pictures was formed in 1982, RCA/Columbia Pictures Home Video became one of the three primary distributors of Tri-Star product for home video (the other two being CBS/Fox Video and Thorn-EMI/HBO Video {later renamed to HBO/Cannon Video and then simply HBO Video}, as CBS and HBO originally held stakes in Tri-Star), and fully assumed distribution of TriStar titles in the early 1990s. In Australia, they signed a deal to distribute releases from Hoyts Distribution and formed a longstanding relationship in August 1983.

They also distributed titles from various other film companies related to Columbia, including most of New Line Cinema's theatrical releases (though not all, as Media Home Entertainment and Family Home Entertainment distributed several New Line films during the Columbia deal). New Line formed their own video label in 1990 (the result of acquiring Nelson Entertainment, which had previously been Embassy Home Entertainment, itself a former Columbia subsidiary), but continued to go through RCA/Columbia Pictures (as well as SVS-Triumph and then Columbia TriStar Home Video) for distribution until 1994, when Turner Broadcasting acquired New Line and Turner Home Entertainment assumed distribution functions. Other companies distributed by RCA/Columbia included Weintraub Entertainment and 21st Century Distribution.

In 1987, once pre-existing distribution deals had expired, Tri-Star Pictures announced that it would be launching a home video unit, Tri-Star Video, with Saul Melnick, a former MGM/UA Home Video employee, as its president. In 1988, after Coca-Cola sold its entertainment business, Tri-Star Video was merged into RCA/Columbia Pictures Home Video. In late 1989, it was rumored that Trans World Entertainment would eventually sign a deal with RCA/Columbia to distribute its titles. This rumor bore fruit by that December when a deal with TWE -- which had by this point become a part of Epic Productions, which struck a separate distribution deal with RCA/Columbia not long before -- was officially announced.

=== As Columbia TriStar Home Video (1991–2001) ===
In March 1990, NBC filed a lawsuit against Columbia and its then-new parent company Sony under the perception that the latter two parties were violating their joint pact. Columbia purchased the foreign video rights to Orion Pictures titles a month earlier. NBC alleged that they were unaware of this transaction and had become convinced that Columbia was forming their own video unit in strict defiance of the joint venture, which was set to expire in 1992. Sony and Columbia denied NBC's claims. As the lawsuit continued into 1991, General Electric, the parent of NBC and RCA, announced that it was divesting its interest in RCA/Columbia. The deal closed in August of that year and the litigation officially ended with Sony renaming the company as Columbia TriStar Home Video (CTHV). In 1998, CTHV signed a deal with The Jim Henson Company to launch its own video label, Jim Henson Home Entertainment, with CTHV distributing; at the time, Columbia Pictures and Henson were also allied theatrically for the Jim Henson Pictures venture.

On February 28, 1999, CTHV and Universal Studios Home Video signed a multi-year deal to allow CTHV to distribute Universal's products on DVD outside North America. For a short time, titles from Columbia TriStar Home Entertainment were also distributed by Universal on VHS between 2002 and 2003.

=== As Columbia TriStar Home Entertainment and Sony Pictures Home Entertainment (2001–present) ===
It was renamed as Columbia TriStar Home Entertainment (CTHE) in the beginning of 2001 and eventually adopted its current name, Sony Pictures Home Entertainment (SPHE), in November 2004.

In 2002, the home video division revived the Destination Films IP, name and logo from a defunct film distributor and repurposed it as a production branch for most direct-to-video titles, with some DTV titles going under the TriStar Pictures and Triumph Films names. The unit was spun off and reorganized as Sony Pictures Worldwide Acquisitions in 2007.

SPHE had a three-year deal, in which they were the exclusive sales agent for Starz's Anchor Bay Entertainment worldwide, with the exceptions of North America, Australia, and the United Kingdom.

On February 21, 2010, The Weinstein Company (TWC) struck a home video distribution deal with SPHE through Sony Pictures Worldwide Acquisitions. On August 31, 2010, SPHE partnered with RLJ Entertainment in a multi-year agreement, marketing and distributing DVDs and Blu-rays by RLJ. RLJ retained their own sales and marketing.

In September 2011, the Australian division of SPHE announced they would merge their video operations with the local operations of Universal Pictures International Entertainment to form a joint-venture called Universal Sony Pictures Home Entertainment.

On April 23, 2012, Mill Creek Entertainment announced that they had signed a sub-licensing deal with SPHE, securing the rights to distribute 250 films from the Sony Pictures catalog on DVD and Blu-ray. On August 27, 2013, this deal was expanded to include 665 films and 54 television series.

Anime News Network reported in February 2013 that Sony Pictures Home Entertainment's Australian joint venture with Universal Pictures Home Entertainment licensed anime television series from NBCUniversal Entertainment Japan for distribution in Australia, with its initial titles, A Certain Magical Index, Shakugan no Shana and Armitage III, scheduled for release on April 24, 2013. From 2017 to 2018, Funimation began directly distributing a select number of its anime titles in Australia and New Zealand through Sony Pictures Home Entertainment's Australian joint venture with Universal Pictures Home Entertainment. In September 2018, Funimation transferred distribution to Madman Entertainment, with Madman handling distribution and classification within the region.

On December 18, 2013, SPHE president David Bishop, who had served since 2006, announced he would leave when his contract expired in March 2014. It was announced that Man Jit Singh would replace Bishop.

On July 22, 2015, SPHE and Transmission Films reached a multi-year distribution pact to release Transmission's library in Australia (through Universal Sony Pictures Home Entertainment Australia Pty Limited) and in New Zealand. On November 20, 2015, SPHE announced that it would release Ultra HD Blu-ray releases.

On March 15, 2016, SPHE partnered with eOne to distribute films by Momentum Pictures across the globe except for Canada on physical and digital home entertainment platforms. In January 2017, SPHE expanded its distribution deal with Genius Brands to include all properties and acquired an equity stake in the company.

On February 6, 2018, Man Jit Singh stepped down as president of SPHE and was replaced by Keith LeGoy.

On February 26, 2021, SPHE entered into a multi-year home entertainment distribution deal with Lionsgate Studios, after the latter's deal with 20th Century Fox ended. Sony began distributing Lionsgate titles in July of the same year with Lionsgate continuing to maintain its own independent sales and marketing teams, while leveraging Sony's supply chain and distribution services for sales.

In February 2024, it was reported that SPHE entered into a multi-year home entertainment distribution deal with The Walt Disney Company, where upon Sony would manufacture, market, and distribute all Disney’s new releases and catalog titles on physical media in the U.S. and Canada that was previously handled by Walt Disney Studios Home Entertainment, and Disney would continue to manage its own digital media.

=== Metro-Goldwyn-Mayer ===
In 2005, when Sony and four partners acquired Metro-Goldwyn-Mayer (MGM) from Kirk Kerkorian, SPHE held the domestic home entertainment rights to MGM's 4,000 film and 10,400 television episode library, though the releases used the MGM DVD label. However, thanks to a cooling DVD market, sales did not meet projections; this was one of several factors that led to MGM splitting off from Sony Pictures' control. On May 31, 2006, MGM ended its distribution deal with SPHE and transferred most of its output to 20th Century Fox Home Entertainment. The MGM fiasco directly led to long time SPHE president Ben Feingold's departure in the fall of 2006, and was replaced by, ironically, MGM Home Entertainment executive Dave Bishop, who brought along numerous MGM employees to replace Sony staffers.

In February 2011, Sony was in negotiations with MGM for a co-financing deal that would've included full distribution rights to the MGM Home Entertainment library; this deal, however, ultimately did not include home media rights to MGM's catalog (which instead remained with Fox), though Sony would distribute some of the films they co-financed on video as part of the deal.

== Sub-labels ==
During this time, the company also has and had some sub-labels, including:

- Magic Window – Children's titles (including He-Man and the Masters of the Universe, The Real Ghostbusters, as well as classic Columbia/UPA cartoons).
- SVS-Triumph – Some low-profile Columbia, TriStar, New Line, CineTel Films, Epic Productions and Triumph Films releases (it was founded in 1981 by John O'Donnell; as Sony Video Software, and renamed after the formation of Sony Pictures Entertainment, to be used briefly in-between the ending of the RCA joint venture and the formation of Columbia-TriStar). The company expanded into film production in 1988, mainly for genre films, first named SVSC Films, then Sony Pictures (unrelated to the current Sony Pictures Entertainment), before changing the name to SVS Films, and later folded its distribution operations into Triumph Releasing Corporation after Sony acquired Columbia Pictures Entertainment before SVS Films shuttered in 1991 and folded into Triumph Releasing Corporation.
- Musicvision – A short-lived music video division of RCA/Columbia Pictures HV in the mid-1980s, primarily releasing artists linked to RCA Records.
- Columbia Classics – A label releasing classic films on DVD by Columbia Pictures; it was previously used for VHS and LaserDisc releases as well.
- Screen Classics by Request – A service available on the web, where obscure classic films are manufactured on demand, similar to Warner Bros.' "Warner Archive" brand.
- Superbit

=== International sub-labels ===
- RCA/Columbia Pictures International Video – Used for videos distributed outside the US and Canada. Orion Pictures films were distributed globally via this label.
- 20/20 Vision – A British rental home video label that released films by TriStar Pictures, Goldcrest Films International, New Line Cinema, Triumph Films and Columbia Pictures.
- Cinema Club - British joint-venture with Video Collection International for budget-priced movies mainly from CTHV's catalog that VCI would distribute. The venture was later sold entirely to VCI, who used it as their low-price budget label for mainstream releases.
- First Independent Films – a British film distributor and home video company formed by HTV after acquiring Vestron Video International's UK operations in May 1990. First Independent was sold to Sony in 1997 and was entirely folded into Columbia TriStar Home Video by 1999. However, Columbia TriStar continued to use the First Independent Films label for some years afterwards.
- First Release Home Entertainment – A low budget film label for releases in Australia and The Netherlands that never fit the Columbia identity.
- Gaumont-Columbia-RCA Video – A joint-venture with Gaumont that released Gaumont, Columbia, TriStar, and Triumph products on VHS. They were formed in 1982, renamed as Gaumont/RCA/Columbia Pictures Home Video in 1986, and under its final name as Gaumont/Columbia TriStar Home Video in 1992.
- RCA/Columbia Pictures/Hoyts Video Pty. Ltd. – An Australian joint-venture with Hoyts Distribution that was formed in August 1983. The company released products from Hoyts, Cannon Films, Columbia Pictures, TriStar and Triumph Films in the market.
- Video Box Office – a mixture of B-movies and some mainstream releases in Australia that also didn't fit the main CTHV or First Release identity.
- VideoServis – A Russian home video label with Walt Disney Studios Home Entertainment that released films by Columbia Pictures, Monumental Pictures, TriStar and Screen Gems, created in 1994.
- Triumph Home Video (Triumph Releasing) - a third B-movie label in Australia that also distributed films from PolyGram Filmed Entertainment in the mid 1990s that also didn't fit the CTHV, First Release or Video Box Office identities.

During the time that Consolidated Press Holdings, and later Publishing and Broadcasting Limited and West Australian Newspapers owned Hoyts, they re-established the Hoyts Distribution arm of the company. SPHE Australia releases Hoyts titles, including the recent box-office hit, Twilight. They also released the handful of films from the Nine Network's film arm, Nine Films and Television.

SPHE also handles the Australian DVD distribution of Lionsgate titles (via Hoyts), after that company was unsuccessful in purchasing Magna Pacific, and the subsequent collapse of the successful bidder, Destra Entertainment.
