= Newmarket Films =

American privately owned independent film company

Newmarket Films, LLC
- Type: Subsidiary
- Industry: Motion pictures
- Founded: 1994; 32 years ago
- Fate: Acquired by Exclusive Media Group; Film library now owned by AMBI Group
- Headquarters: Los Angeles, California, United States

Newmarket Films, LLC was an American privately owned independent film production and distribution company and a former film distribution subsidiary of Newmarket Capital Group. Newmarket distributed, in North America, such films as Memento,The Passion of the Christ, Whale Rider, Monster, Donnie Darko, and God Grew Tired of Us.

== History ==
Newmarket Capital Group was founded in 1994 by William Tyrer and Chris Ball, with the company's executive team made up of Chris Calhoon, Rene Cogan, John Crye and Robert Fyvolent. The company was originally launched as a film financing company. Newmarket financed and produced films that had "break-out potential" and finance as small as $2 million and as large as $20 million. Newmarket had output deals with Summit Entertainment, Original Film and Escape Artists.

While financing and producing Memento, the company had trouble trying to find a distribution deal. Memento was a critical and commercial success, thus leading Newmarket Films to become a full theatrical distribution company. In 2005, members of the company left to start its own distribution wing, Picturehouse.

Newmarket Films was acquired by Exclusive Media Group (which eventually became Exclusive Media) in 2009. In 2010, Newmarket made a deal with Lionsgate Home Entertainment to become the exclusive home entertainment distributor for Newmarket's film library. Later that year, Chris Ball left the company to form the distribution company Wrekin Hill Entertainment; Rene Cogan and John Crye joined him. Exclusive Media then sold its own film library, including the Newmarket library, to AMBI Group in 2015.

== Filmography ==
As distributor

Release date	Title	Notes
March 16, 2001	Memento	Inducted into the National Film Registry in 2017
October 26, 2001	Donnie Darko	
October 18, 2002	Real Women Have Curves	Inducted into the National Film Registry in 2019
February 21, 2003	Open Hearts	
March 14, 2003	Spun	
April 18, 2003	Lilya 4-ever	
June 6, 2003	Whale Rider	
December 17, 2003	Monster	
February 25, 2004	The Passion of the Christ	
August 16, 2004	Stander	
September 24, 2004	Silver City	
October 15, 2004	P.S.	
December 10, 2004	The Green Butchers	
December 24, 2004	The Woodsman	
February 2, 2005	Daybreak	
February 18, 2005	Downfall	
April 8, 2005	A Hole in My Heart	
June 3, 2005	Rock School	
August 5, 2005	The Chumscrubber	
January 27, 2006	Tristram Shandy: A Cock & Bull Story	
October 27, 2006	Death of a President	
January 12, 2007	God Grew Tired of Us	
August 31, 2007	The Nines	
January 22, 2010	Creation	
May 28, 2010	Agora	
October 21, 2010	The Last Play at Shea	
December 29, 2010	The Way Back	
May 13, 2011	Hesher	

As financier/producer

- American Pie
- Anna Karenina
- A Better Way to Die
- Bound
- Cruel Intentions
- Cruel Intentions 2
- Cruel Intentions 3
- Dead Man
- Devour
- Different for Girls
- FairyTale: A True Story
- Felicia's Journey
- A Hole in My Heart
- The Importance of Being Earnest
- In Your Hands
- It's the Rage
- The King Is Alive
- The Loss of Sexual Innocence
- Mean Guns
- Memento (co-production with Summit Entertainment) (DVD distributed by Sony Pictures Home Entertainment)
- The Mexican
- Mrs Dalloway
- My Big Fat Greek Wedding
- My Family
- Open Hearts
- The Prestige
- Prom Night
- Rogue Trader
- S. Darko
- The Shooter
- Sidewalks of New York
- Silent Trigger
- A Simple Plan
- The Skulls
- The Skulls II
- The Skulls III
- Sliding Doors
- Splendor
- Stark Raving Mad (co-production with Summit Entertainment) (DVD distributed by Sony Pictures Home Entertainment)
- Stranger than Fiction
- Top Dog
- Topsy-Turvy
- The Usual Suspects
- Velvet Goldmine
- A Walk on the Moon
- The Whole Wide World
- Wrong Turn
- Y Tu Mamá También

== See also ==
- Independent film
