= Adam Del Deo =

American film producer and director

Adam Del Deo at the 2026 New York Film Festival

Adam Del Deo is an American film producer and director.

== Filmography ==
=== Director ===
- Sport in America: Our Defining Stories (2013)
- Every Little Step (2008)
- ...So Goes the Nation (2006)
- The Year of the Yao (2004)
