= James D. Stern =

American film producer

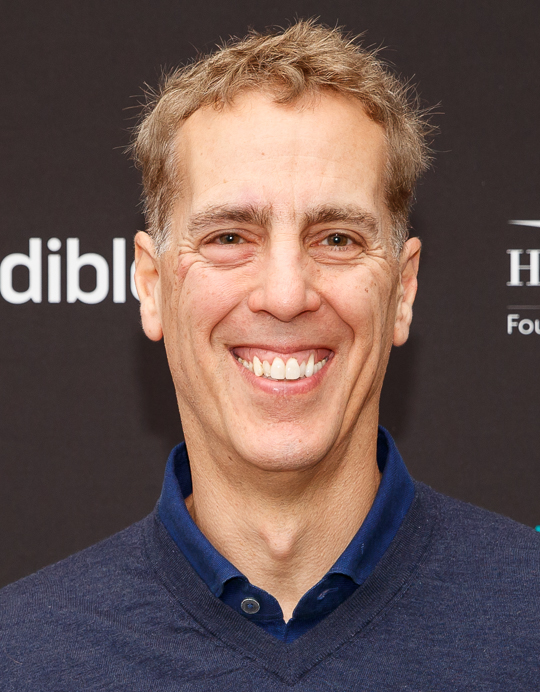
- Stern at the annual Montclair Film Festival in Montclair, New Jersey, May 2018
- Born: July 18, 1957 (age 69); United States
- Education: University of Michigan
- Occupation: Producer

James D. Stern is an American film and Broadway producer. He won a 2003 Tony Award for Hairspray, has been nominated for other awards, and was a Drama Desk Award winner for Stomp.

== Life and career ==
=== Background ===
Before starting Endgame Entertainment, Stern co-directed and produced the IMAX film Michael Jordan to the Max and HBO's It's the Rage. On stage he produced The Producers, the 12-time Tony Award-winning Mel Brooks show and the eight time Tony Award-winning Hairspray. Stern produced Stomp, The Diary of Anne Frank starring Natalie Portman, Legally Blonde; Twilight 1992, which was nominated for a Tony; and The Weir, an Olivier Award-winning play. He produced Alan Menken's Leap of Faith during the fall of 2010.

Stern founded and ran the financial investment company and hedge fund Stern Joint Venture, L.P. (SJV). He produced the thriller Self/less with his company Endgame Entertainment and FilmDistrict. He directed the 2018 documentary American Chaos. He has a B.A. degree in directing from the University of Michigan in Ann Arbor, and a M.B.A. degree in marketing and finance from Columbia University in Manhattan, New York.

=== Endgame Entertainment ===
Endgame Entertainment
- Type: Independent Company
- Industry: Motion Pictures
- Founded: March 11, 2002
- Founder: James D. Stern
- Headquarters: Beverly Hills, California, U.S.
- Products: Films
- Owner: James D. Stern

On March 11, 2002, Stern founded Endgame Entertainment as an independent production company to produce, develop, and finance films and other forms of entertainment properties. Under his leadership, Endgame Entertainment has financed or cofinanced more than 25 films. Endgame filmed Seeking Justice, directed by Roger Donaldson and starring Nicolas Cage, January Jones, and Guy Pearce. They also released An Education (Sony Pictures Classics), which received three Academy Award nominations and Every Little Step (Sony Pictures Classics), which Stern co-produced and co-directed. The documentary grossed about $1.7 million and was shortlisted for an Academy Award.

Previous Endgame releases include Summit's The Brothers Bloom, Sony Pictures Classics' Easy Virtue, and the Bob Dylan biopic I'm Not There, featuring an Oscar-nominated performance by Cate Blanchett. Hotel Rwanda and Lord of War for Lionsgate, Proof for Miramax, Universal's White Noise, Hollywood Pictures' Stay Alive, and New Line's Harold & Kumar Go to White Castle are earlier releases. Stern co-directed and produced the documentaries The Year of the Yao (New Line) and ...So Goes the Nation (IFC).

== Filmography ==
He was a producer in all films unless otherwise noted.

=== Film ===
Year	Film	Credit
1995	Jeffrey	Associate producer
1997	35 Miles from Normal	
1999	Let the Devil Wear Black	Co-executive producer
1999	It's the Rage	
2004	Stage Beauty	Executive producer
2004	Harold & Kumar Go to White Castle	Executive producer
2004	Five Children and It	Executive producer
2005	Rag Tale	Executive producer
2005	Proof	Executive producer
2005	River Queen	Executive producer
2005	Beowulf & Grendel	Executive producer
2005	Lord of War	Executive producer
2005	The Best Man	Executive producer
2006	The Alibi	
2006	Stay Alive	
2006	Comeback Season	Executive producer
2007	Solstice	
2007	I'm Not There	
2008	Easy Virtue	
2008	The Brothers Bloom	
2009	An Education	Executive producer
2011	A Good Old Fashioned Orgy	
2011	Seeking Justice	
2012	The Raven	Executive producer
2012	Looper	
2013	A Haunted House	Executive producer
2013	Jobs	Executive producer
2013	Side Effects	Executive producer
2013	Homefront	Executive producer
2015	Self/less	
2015	Freeheld	
2016	Snowden	Executive producer
2016	Army of One	
2017	The Discovery	
2018	Come Sunday	
2018	The Old Man & the Gun	
2019	Murder Mystery	
2021	Bliss	
2023	Murder Mystery 2	

As director

Year	Film
1999	It's the Rage

Miscellaneous crew

Year	Film	Role
2007	Hairspray	Stage producer: Broadway

Thanks

Year	Film	Role
2005	The Producers	Acknowledgment: Producer of the Broadway play
2016	Gold	Thanks

=== Television ===
Year	Title	Credit	Notes
2006	Meteor and the Mighty Monster Trucks	Executive producer	
2013	Dancing on the Edge	Executive producer	
2013	Sport in America: Our Defining Stories	Executive producer	Documentary
2016−20	Last Chance U	Executive producer	Documentary
2021	Last Chance U: Basketball	Executive producer	Documentary

As director

Year	Title	Notes
2013	Sport in America: Our Defining Stories	Documentary
2020	Giving Voice	Documentary, co-director

Miscellaneous crew

Year	Title	Role	Notes
2007	Legally Blonde: The Musical	Producer for the stage	Television film

Thanks

Year	Title	Role
2001	Great Performances	Acknowledgment: In association with and produced for the Broadway stage
