= Picturehouse (company) =

American film company founded in 2005

- Type: Private
- Industry: Entertainment
- Founded: 2005; 21 years ago (original company); 2013; 13 years ago (revived studio)
- Founders: Bob Berney
- Defunct: 2008; 18 years ago (original company)
- Successor: Studio: New Line Cinema; Warner Bros. Clockwork (original incarnation); Library: Warner Bros. Clockwork (original incarnation)
- Headquarters: Los Angeles, California, U.S.
- Key people: Bob Berney (CEO); Jeanne R. Berney (COO)
- Parent: Time Warner (2005–2008)
- Website: picturehouse.com

Picturehouse is an American independent entertainment company owned by CEO Bob Berney and COO Jeanne R. Berney. Based in Los Angeles, the company specializes in film marketing and distribution, both in the U.S. and internationally. Picturehouse's leadership focuses on theatrical distribution while considering the entire life of a film.

Many Picturehouse titles have received critical acclaim, including most recently BAFTA Award nominee Becoming Cousteau (2021), Emmy Award winner The Territory (2022) and the Oscar nominated Porcelain War (2024).

After Warner Bros. Clockwork founded on December 18, 2025, with its name officially revealed at the 2026 CinemaCon on April 14, 2026, Warner Bros. Clockwork re-acquired the distribution rights to the first incarnation of Picturehouse' films from New Line Cinema and HBO Films.

== History ==
=== As a TimeWarner subsidiary (2005–2008) ===
Formed by Bob Berney in 2005, Picturehouse was a joint venture created by Time Warner subsidiaries New Line Cinema and HBO Films to acquire, produce and distribute independent films. Berney, who guided the acquisition, marketing and distribution of Christopher Nolan’s Memento, Joel Zwick’s My Big Fat Greek Wedding and Mel Gibson’s The Passion of the Christ, among other notable releases, has run the company from its inception.

Over the next two years, Picturehouse released features such as Robert Altman's A Prairie Home Companion, starring Meryl Streep and Lily Tomlin; Guillermo del Toro's Pan's Labyrinth, which was acquired at script stage and went on to earn six Academy Award nominations and wins in three categories; La Vie en Rose, which garnered Marion Cotillard an Academy Award for Best Actress; and Sergei Bodrov's Genghis Khan biopic Mongol, a nominee for Best Foreign Language Film.

Time Warner's 2008 consolidation resulted in Warner Bros. exiting the independent business to concentrate on big-budget "tentpole" releases. This prompted the closure of marketing and distribution operations at both New Line Cinema and Picturehouse, costing 70 employees their jobs.

=== Independence (2013–present) ===
In 2013, Berney and his wife Jeanne acquired the Picturehouse logo and trademark from Warner Bros. and relaunched the label as an independent theatrical distribution company. Initial releases included Adriana Trigiani's Big Stone Gap, starring Ashley Judd; Grammy Award nominee Metallica Through the Never, starring Dane DeHaan; and Adam Wingard's The Guest, an Independent Spirit Award nominee starring Dan Stevens and Maika Monroe.

In 2020, the company released the faith-based drama Fatima, directed by Marco Pontecorvo and starring Joaquim de Almeida, Goran Visnjic, Harvey Keitel and Sônia Braga. One year later, Picturehouse announced that it would release Becoming Cousteau, a documentary using previously unseen archival footage to chronicle the life and career of the adventurous oceanographer and filmmaker Jacques-Yves Cousteau, who coinvented scuba diving and foretold the impact of pollution on climate change. Directed by Liz Garbus, the film was released on October 22, 2021, and earned a 2022 British Academy Film Award for Best Documentary, in addition to winning Best Science/Nature Documentary at the 2021 Critics’ Choice Documentary Awards.

Alex Pritz's The Territory, a 2022 documentary chronicling the struggle of Brazil's indigenous Uru-eu-wau-wau against farmers, colonizers and settlers whose deforestation encroaches on a protected area of the Amazon rainforest, was shortlisted for the 95th Academy Awards in the Best Documentary Feature category and won the award for Exceptional Merit in Documentary Filmmaking at the 75th Emmy Awards.

In 2024, Brendan Bellomo and Slava Leontyev's Porcelain War, which documents the experience of Ukrainian artists facing the Russian occupation in Ukraine, won the U.S. Documentary Competition Grand Jury Prize at Sundance and was later Oscar nominated in the Best Documentary Feature Film category.

In 2026, Picturehouse teamed up with Joe Bob Briggs to launch the new production company Coney Island Pictures. One of the first film in development is a remake of Basket Case.

== Filmography ==
=== 2000s ===
Original seal, distributed by New Line Home Entertainment and HBO Video (now Warner Bros. Home Entertainment)

Release date	Title	Ref.
July 22, 2005	Last Days	
September 16, 2005	The Thing About My Folks	
October 19, 2005	Ushpizin	
January 27, 2006	A Cock and Bull Story	
April 14, 2006	The Notorious Bettie Page	
June 9, 2006	A Prairie Home Companion	
November 9, 2006	Who the #$&% Is Jackson Pollock?	
November 10, 2006	Fur: An Imaginary Portrait of Diane Arbus	
December 29, 2006	Pan's Labyrinth	
March 9, 2007	Starter for 10	
June 1, 2007	Gracie	
June 8, 2007	La Vie en Rose	
August 3, 2007	El Cantante	
August 10, 2007	Rocket Science	
August 17, 2007	The King of Kong: A Fistful of Quarters	
September 14, 2007	Silk	
January 11, 2008	The Orphanage	
February 8, 2008	Wild West Comedy Show: 30 Days and 30 Nights – Hollywood to the Heartland	
February 29, 2008 (DVD)	The Fox and the Child	
March 28, 2008	Run Fatboy Run	
June 6, 2008	Mongol	
July 2, 2008	Kit Kittredge: An American Girl	
September 12, 2008	The Women	
January 20, 2009 (DVD)	Amusement	

=== 2010s ===
Revived seal, distributed by Universal Pictures Home Entertainment

Release date	Title	Ref.
October 4, 2013	Metallica: Through the Never	
September 17, 2014	The Guest	
July 17, 2015	Gloria	
October 9, 2015	Big Stone Gap	

=== 2020s ===
Release date	Title	Ref.
August 28, 2020	Fatima	
October 22, 2021	Becoming Cousteau	
August 19, 2022	The Territory	
November 11, 2022	Retrograde	
April 14, 2023	Wild Life	
October 13, 2023	The Mission	
November 3, 2023	At The Gates	
March 22, 2024	Carol Doda Topless at the Condor	
June 10, 2024	Frank Miller: American Genius	
October 4, 2024	Leap of Faith	
November 22, 2024	Porcelain War	
October 10, 2025	Re-Election	
November 28, 2025	The Tale of Silyan	
December 12, 2025	The King of Color	
March 27, 2026	Our Hero, Balthazar	
