= Libertine =

Person who rejects common moral or sexual restraints that are deemed undesirable

A libertine is a person questioning and challenging most moral principles, such as responsibility or sexual restraints, and will often declare these traits as unnecessary, undesirable or evil. A libertine is especially someone who ignores or even spurns accepted morals and forms of behaviour observed by the larger society.

The values and practices of libertines are known collectively as libertinism or libertinage and are described as an extreme form of hedonism or liberalism. Libertines put value on physical pleasures, meaning those experienced through the senses. As a philosophy, libertinism gained new-found adherents in the 17th, 18th, and 19th centuries, particularly in France and Great Britain. Notable among these were John Wilmot, 2nd Earl of Rochester, Cyrano de Bergerac, and the Marquis de Sade.

The term libertine was first used pejoratively by John Calvin in 16th-century Geneva to describe opponents of his strict church discipline, particularly the faction led by Ami Perrin. In England, some Lollards also embraced libertine views, such as dismissing adultery as sin. By the 18th and 19th centuries, the term became strongly associated with debauchery and excess, exemplified in literature like Choderlos de Laclos’ Les Liaisons dangereuses, as well as the broader French libertine novel tradition that combined eroticism, anti-clericalism, and anti-establishment themes. In philosophy, libertinism was linked with freethinking circles like the libertinage érudit in Baroque France and with Hobbesian materialism. Over time, the figure of the libertine came to be associated with a wide range of rulers, writers, and cultural figures—from Caligula and Louis XV to Casanova, Lord Byron, and Jim Morrison.

== History of the term ==
The word libertine was originally coined by John Calvin to negatively describe opponents of his policies in Geneva, Switzerland. The group, led by Ami Perrin, argued against Calvin's "insistence that church discipline should be enforced uniformly against all members of Genevan society". Perrin and his allies were elected to the town council in 1548, and "broadened their support base in Geneva by stirring up resentment among the older inhabitants against the increasing number of religious refugees who were fleeing France in even greater numbers".

By 1555, Calvinists were firmly in place on the Genevan town council, so the Libertines, led by Perrin, responded with an "attempted coup against the government and called for the massacre of the French. This was the last great political challenge Calvin had to face in Geneva". In England, a few Lollards held libertine views such as that adultery and fornication were not sin, or that "whoever died in faith would be saved irrespective of his way of life".

During the 18th and 19th centuries, the term became more associated with debauchery. Charles-Maurice de Talleyrand wrote that Joseph Bonaparte "sought only life's pleasures and easy access to libertinism" while on the throne of Naples.

== Literature ==
Les Liaisons dangereuses (Dangerous Liaisons, 1782), an epistolary novel by Pierre Choderlos de Laclos, is a trenchant description of sexual libertinism. Wayland Young argues: "... the mere analysis of libertinism ... carried out by a novelist with such a prodigious command of his medium ... was enough to condemn it and play a large part in its destruction."

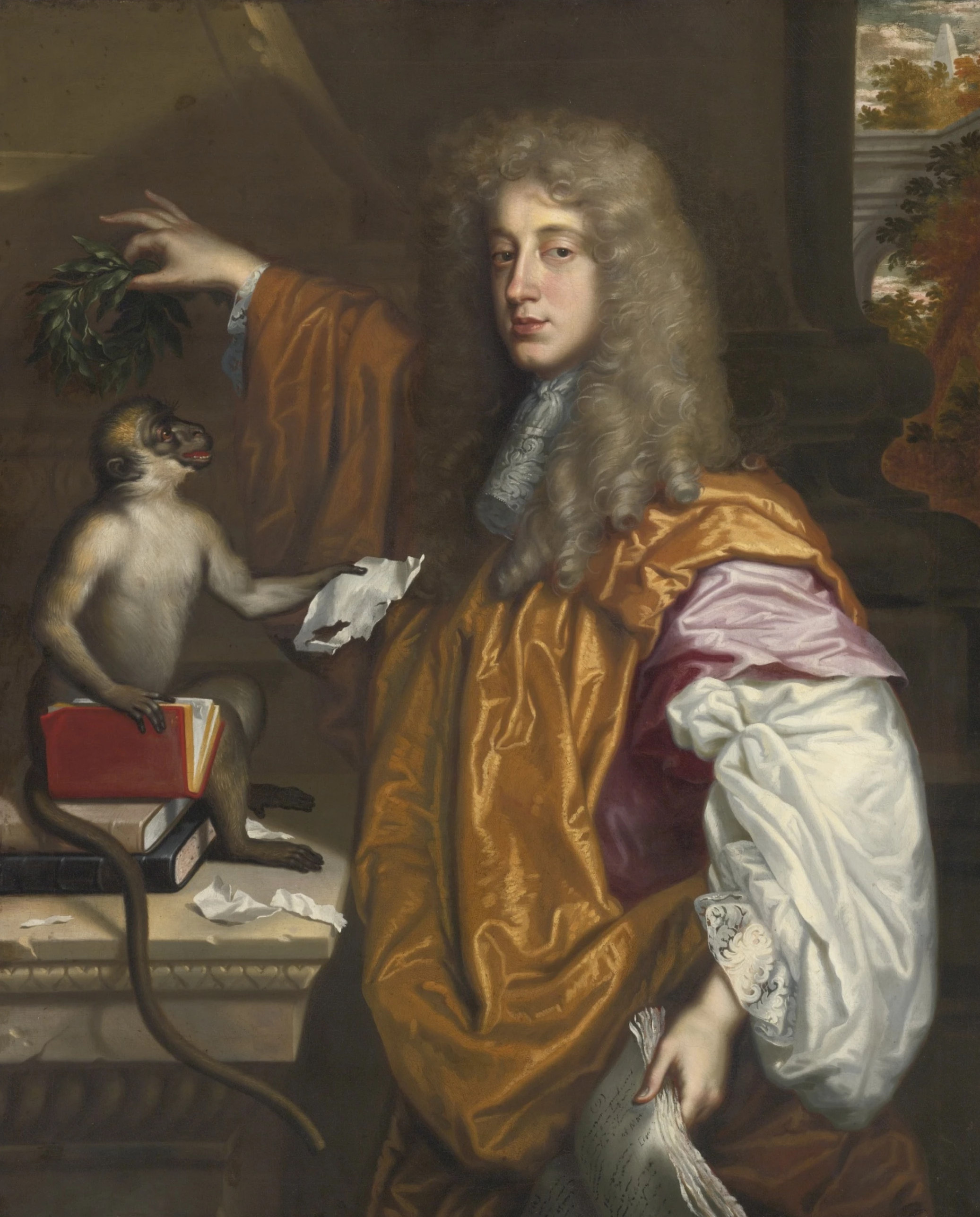
The 2nd Earl of Rochester, a notorious English libertine

Agreeable to Calvin's emphasis on the need for uniformity of discipline in Geneva, Samuel Rutherford (Professor of Divinity in the University of St. Andrews, and Christian minister in 17th-century Scotland) offered a rigorous treatment of "Libertinism" in his polemical work "A Free Disputation Against Pretended Liberty of Conscience" (1649).

A Satyr Against Reason and Mankind is a poem by John Wilmot, 2nd Earl of Rochester which addresses the question of the proper use of reason, and is generally assumed to be a Hobbesian critique of rationalism. The narrator subordinates reason to sense. It is based to some extent on Boileau's version of Juvenal's eighth or fifteenth satire, and is also indebted to Hobbes, Montaigne, Lucretius, and Epicurus, as well as the general libertine tradition. Confusion has arisen in its interpretation as it is ambiguous as to whether the speaker is Rochester himself, or a satirised persona. It criticises the vanities and corruptions of the statesmen and politicians of the court of Charles II.

The libertine novel was a primarily 18th-century literary genre of which the roots lay in the European but mainly French libertine tradition. The genre effectively ended with the French Revolution. Themes of libertine novels were anti-clericalism, anti-establishment and eroticism.

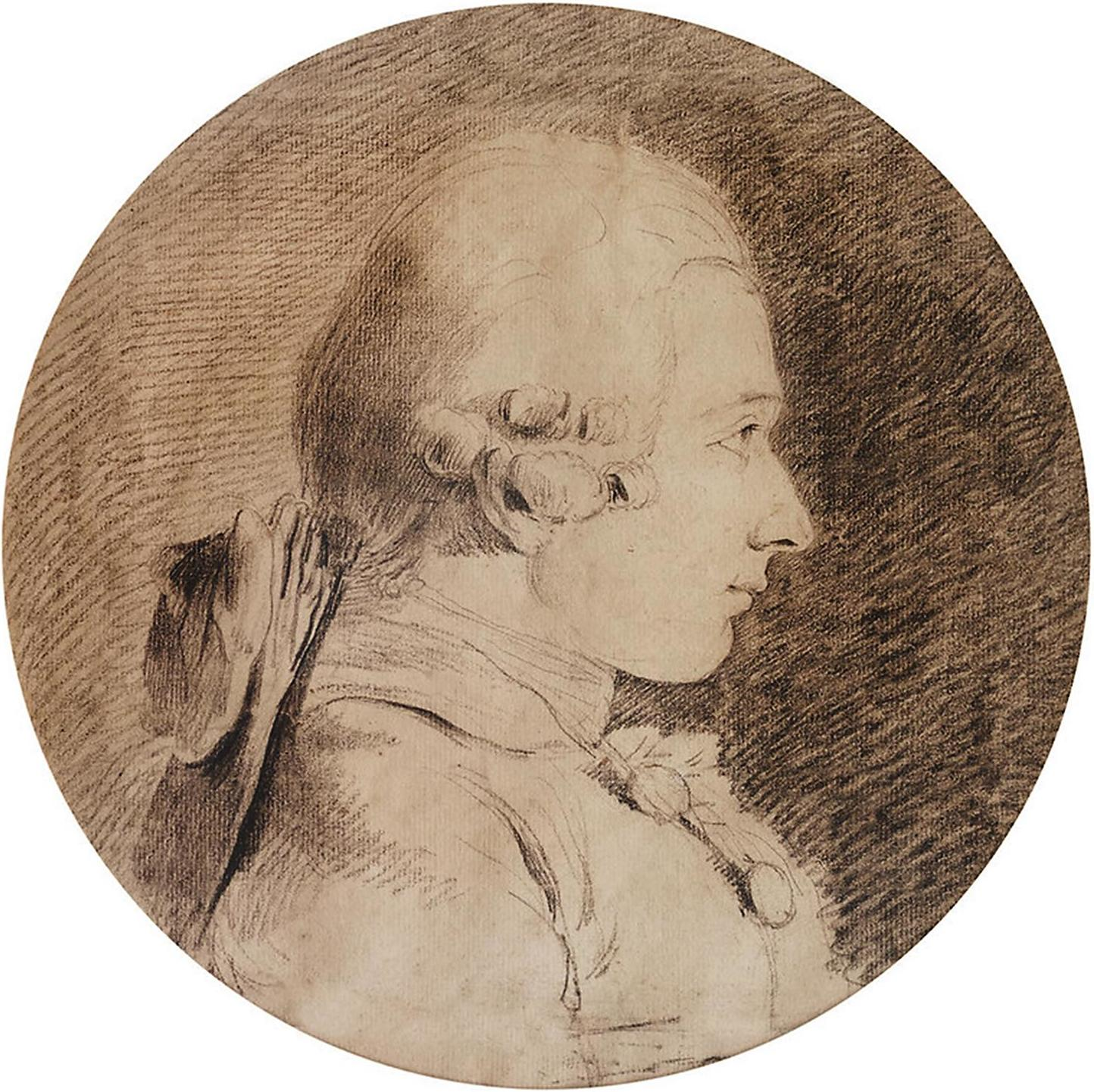
Marquis de Sade by Charles-Amédée-Philippe van Loo

Authors include Claude Prosper Jolyot de Crébillon (Les Égarements du cœur et de l'esprit, 1736; Le Sopha, conte moral, 1742), Denis Diderot (Les bijoux indiscrets, 1748), Marquis de Sade (L'Histoire de Juliette, 1797–1801), Choderlos de Laclos (Les Liaisons dangereuses, 1782), and John Wilmot (Sodom, or the Quintessence of Debauchery, 1684).

Other famous titles are Histoire de Dom Bougre, Portier des Chartreux (1741) and Thérèse Philosophe (1748).

Precursors to the libertine writers were Théophile de Viau (1590–1626) and Charles de Saint-Evremond (1610–1703), who were inspired by Epicurus and the publication of Petronius.

Robert Darnton is a cultural historian who has covered this genre extensively. A three-part essay in The Book Collector by David Foxen explores libertine literature in England, 1660-1745.

Critics have been divided as to the literary merits of William Hazlitt's Liber Amoris, a deeply personal account of frustrated love that is quite unlike anything else Hazlitt ever wrote. Wardle suggests that it was compelling but marred by sickly sentimentality, and also proposes that Hazlitt might even have been anticipating some of the experiments in chronology made by later novelists.

One or two positive reviews appeared, such as the one in the Globe, 7 June 1823: "The Liber Amoris is unique in the English language; and as, possibly, the first book in its fervour, its vehemency, and its careless exposure of passion and weakness—of sentiments and sensations which the common race of mankind seek most studiously to mystify or conceal—that exhibits a portion of the most distinguishing characteristics of Rousseau, it ought to be generally praised". Dan Cruickshank in his book London's Sinful Secret summarized Hazlitt's infatuation stating: "Decades after her death Batsy (Careless) still haunted the imagination of the essayist William Hazlitt, a man who lodged near Covent Garden during the 1820s, where he became unpleasantly intimate with the social consequences of unconventional sexual obsession that he revealed in his Liber Amoris of 1823, in which he candidly confessed to his infatuation with his landlord's young daughter."

== Philosophy ==
During the Baroque era in France, there existed a freethinking circle of philosophers and intellectuals who were collectively known as libertinage érudit and which included Gabriel Naudé, Élie Diodati and François de La Mothe Le Vayer. The critic Vivian de Sola Pinto linked John Wilmot, 2nd Earl of Rochester's libertinism to Hobbesian materialism.

== Notable libertines ==
Some notable libertines include:

=== Rulers and political figures ===
- Al-Amin, the sixth Abbasid ruler
- Caligula, third Emperor of Rome
- Edward VII of Great Britain
- Elagabalus
- George IV of the United Kingdom
- Henry IV of France
- Louis XV, King of France from 1715 to 1774
- Sir Charles Sedley, 5th Baronet, English noble
- Dominique Strauss-Kahn, French economist and politician
- John Wilkes
- Bernardo de Monteagudo

=== Religious leaders ===
- Aleister Crowley, creator of Thelema
- Anton Szandor LaVey, founder of the Church of Satan and creator of LaVeyan Satanism
- Pope Alexander VI, Pope of the Catholic Church from 1492 to 1503

=== Actors ===
- Tallulah Bankhead, American actress
- Charlie Sheen, American actor

=== Musicians ===
- Lorenzo Da Ponte, Italian librettist
- Courtney Love, American grunge musician known as the singer and songwriter of Hole.
- Jim Morrison, musician best known as the singer and primary songwriter of The Doors

=== Writers ===
- Abu Nuwas al-Salami, a classical Arabic poet
- Harry Crosby, American poet and founder of Black Sun Press
- Marquis de Sade, French novelist, after whom the term "sadism" is named
- Félix María de Samaniego, Spanish neoclassical fabulist
- Ivan Barkov, Russian poet
- Charles Baudelaire, French poet
- Aphra Behn, English playwright
- Cyrano de Bergerac, French novelist
- Bussy-Rabutin, cousin of Madame de Sévigné, and author of Histoire Amoureuse des Gaules (chronicling the love affairs of the court of Louis XIV).
- Lord Byron, English poet
- Arthur Rimbaud, French poet

=== Others ===
- James Burton Junior, pioneering English Egyptologist
- Giacomo Casanova, Italian adventurer
- Don Juan, legendary character known for his machismo and sexuality

== See also ==
- Amoralism
- Antinomianism
- Bacchanalia
- Bohemianism
- Cainites
- Charvaka
- Cyrenaics
- Decadence
- Hellfire Club
- Hookup culture
- Epicureanism
- Free love
- Hypersexuality
- Incest taboo
- LaVeyan Satanism
- Libertarianism
- Libertine novel
- The Libertines
- Moral nihilism
- Orgy
- Polyamory
- Rake (character)
- Sodomy
- Sodom and Gomorrah
- Sexual deviancy
- Sexual revolution
- Swinging (sexual practice)
- Taboo
