= Libertine novel =

Novel written from a libertine viewpoint

The libertine novel was an 18th-century literary genre of which the roots lay in the European but mainly French libertine tradition. The genre effectively ended with the French Revolution. Themes of libertine novels were anti-clericalism, anti-establishment and eroticism.

Authors include Cyrano de Bergerac (L'Autre monde ou les états et empires de la Lune, 1657), Claude Prosper Jolyot de Crébillon (Les Égarements du cœur et de l'esprit, 1736; Le Sopha, conte moral, 1742), Denis Diderot (Les bijoux indiscrets, 1748), the Marquis de Sade (L'Histoire de Juliette, 1797–1801) and Choderlos de Laclos (Les Liaisons dangereuses, 1782).

Other famous titles are Histoire de Dom Bougre, Portier des Chartreux (1741) and Thérèse Philosophe (1748).

Precursors to the libertine writers were Théophile de Viau (1590–1626) and Charles de Saint-Évremond (1610–1703), who were inspired by Epicurus and the publication of Petronius, and John Wilmot (Sodom, or the Quintessence of Debauchery, 1684).

Robert Darnton is a cultural historian who has covered this genre extensively.

== English translations ==
In alphabetical order by author's last name:

- Argens, Marquis d' (2020). Thérèse Finds Happiness (aka Therese The Philosopher). New Urge Editions/Black Scat Books. ISBN 9781734816631.
- Choderlos de Laclos, Pierre (2008). Les Liaisons dangereuses. Oxford World's Classics. ISBN 9780199536481.
- Chorier, Nicholas (2020). School of Women (aka: The Academy of Ladies). New Urge Editions/Black Scat Books. ISBN 9781734816686.
- Crébillon, Claude-Prosper Jolyot de (1981). The Wanderings of the Heart and Mind. Gallimard. ISBN 9782070368914.
- Declose, Anne (2013). The Story of O. Ballantine Books. ASIN B00BRUQ7O0.
- Diderot, Denis (2020). From Their Lips to His Ear (aka: The Indiscreet Toys). New Urge Editions/Black Scat Books. ISBN 9781735615912.
- Diderot, Denis (1993). The Indiscreet Jewels. Marsilio Publishers. ISBN 9780941419833.
- Ewing, Frederick R. (1956). I, Libertine. Ballantine Books. ISBN 9781480410107.
- La Morlière, Jacques Rochette de (2020). A Coming of Age (Part One of "The Ecclesiastical Laurels"). New Urge Editions/Black Scat Books. ISBN 9781734816679.
- La Morlière, Jacques Rochette de (2020). Ecclesiastical Laurels: or Abbot T***'s Campaigns with the Triumph of the Nuns. Sunny Lou Publishing. ISBN 9781735477657.
- Meusnier de Querlon, Anne-Gabriel (2020). Don't Touch (aka: The Carmelite Extern Nun). New Urge Editions/Black Scat Books. ISBN 9781734816662.
- Restif de la Bretonne (2020). Foot Notes (first 10 chapters of Fanchette's Foot). New Urge Editions/Black Scat Books. ISBN 9781735615929.
- Sade, Marquis de (1994). Juliette. Grove Press. ISBN 9780802130853.
- Sade, Marquis de (2013). Justine, or the Misfortunes of Virtue. Oxford University Press. ISBN 9780199572847.
