= Bijou (jewellery) =

Intricate jewellery piece

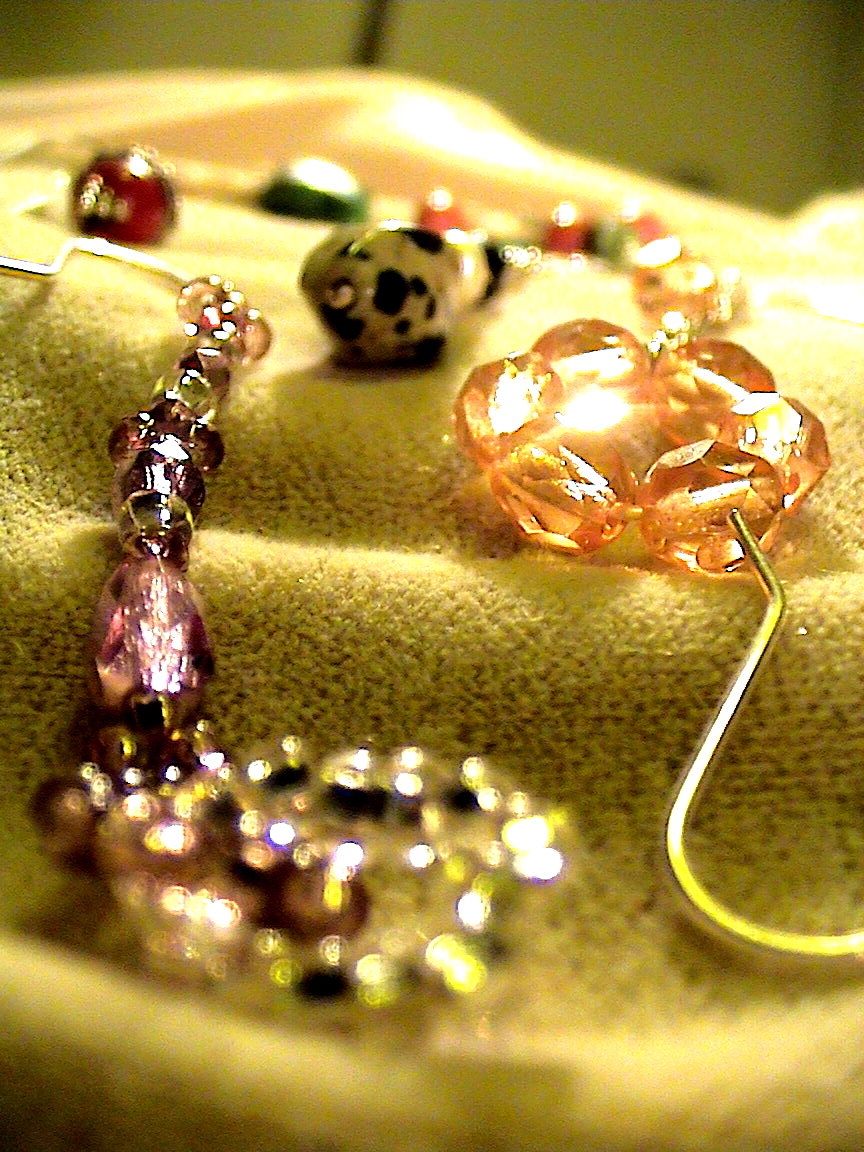

A bijou (plural: bijoux) from the French bijou (pl. bijoux) is an intricate jewellery piece incorporated into clothing, or worn by itself on the body.

== Use ==
Besides its decorative function, a bijou serves as a signal for many other purposes. These have varied over time and space, and really its perceived function is dictated by the wearer, not those who view it. Nevertheless, it is possible roughly to categorise:

=== In high society ===
A bijou can be a mark of social status, and indicates whether the wearer is married, engaged, a debutante, and so forth. Traditionally, these kind of bijou have jade, or other black stone.

=== As member ===
Bijoux can indicate the membership of some group, be it a religion, a profession, a political allegiance, one of ethnicity or sex, or allegiance to a sports team: as wristbands might do in other cultures. They are also used as purely identification symbols, for example the Compagnons du Tour de France wear them as earrings to show their allegiance to a particular rider. In a crowd, it may thus distinguish them from others supporting other riders, depending on how dedicated each are to recognise the symbol.

=== As a magic or religious symbol ===
Bijoux are often used for physical therapy, like amulets. Generally, a significant date is inscribed thereon, and perhaps their birth colour, or their astrological sign, a patron saint, or other magic symbols. They may also be used for fun in guessing-games.

The date, generally, is that of the birth of the wearer. A fish symbol, often called an Ichthys, indicates that the wearer is a Christian.

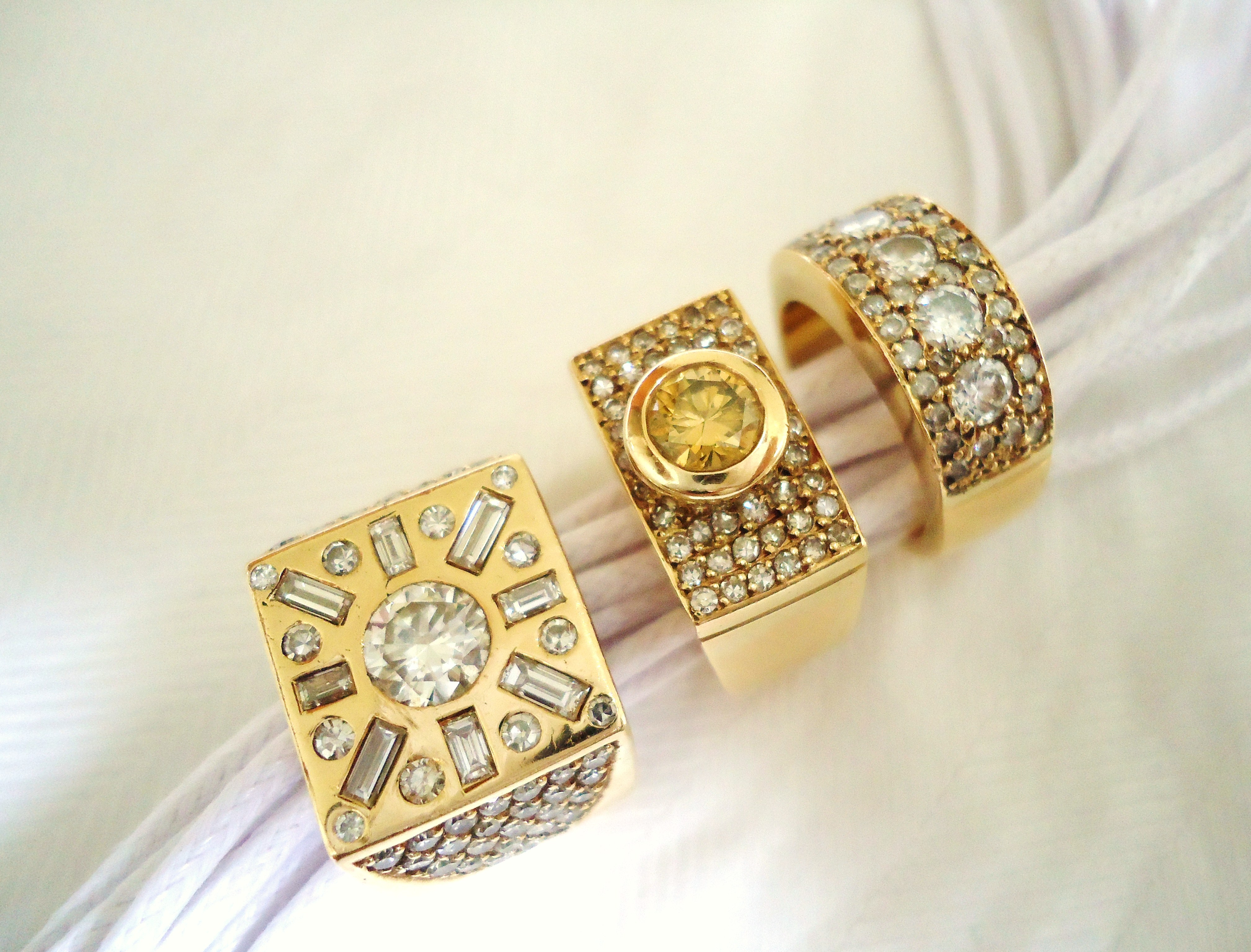
Bijou jewellery

=== As a gift of love ===
Bijoux are often given as a symbol of love, specifically to one person. It has a special meaning to the wearer, and similarly to that of an engagement ring, is displayed publicly and proudly. In French it is sometimes called a souvenir, but this is a false friend, souvenir being the infinitive for the verb "to remember".

Bijouterie, the art of making or wearing bijoux, has thus developed its own private language or rebus known only to the initiated. Symbols may be religious or allegorical (two hands intertwined, for example, indicate the love of two fools, like Romeo and Juliet); Pansies (French: fleurs de pensée, literally "Flowers of thought") indicate "I am thinking of you".

Sometimes the bijou will have, hidden under a clasp, a photograph of the lover-to-be, or a strand of their hair, or one of their baby teeth.

The bijou is usually given as a symbol of eternal love, and also its fragility: it can be easily broken, lost or discarded. Sometimes the gemstone is made of glass to emphasise this fragility and essential uselessness, such as those made by Foire de Beaucaire (Gard-France) in the 18th century (The name comes from the small cry made by the wearer when it was torn from her.)

=== As a promise of sex ===
Baudelaire writes of the bijou's function thus in his novel Les Bijoux, as does Diderot in Les bijoux indiscrets. (Roughly, "The Indiscreet Jewels"). In both novels, the bijou serves as a symbol, like a pink carnation may do in English culture. It is worn by the wearer to show that she is available but must be wooed, before any touch, sight or smell, and is an erotic act of self-denial.

As a well-known symbol, this same object can still have various uses. Among others, it is a symbol of emancipation and a symbol of sexual equality, but most people in Western culture wear it as a sign of faithfulness, be it in marriage, religion, or society. Not to wear one is a statement in itself.

== History ==
=== Prehistory ===
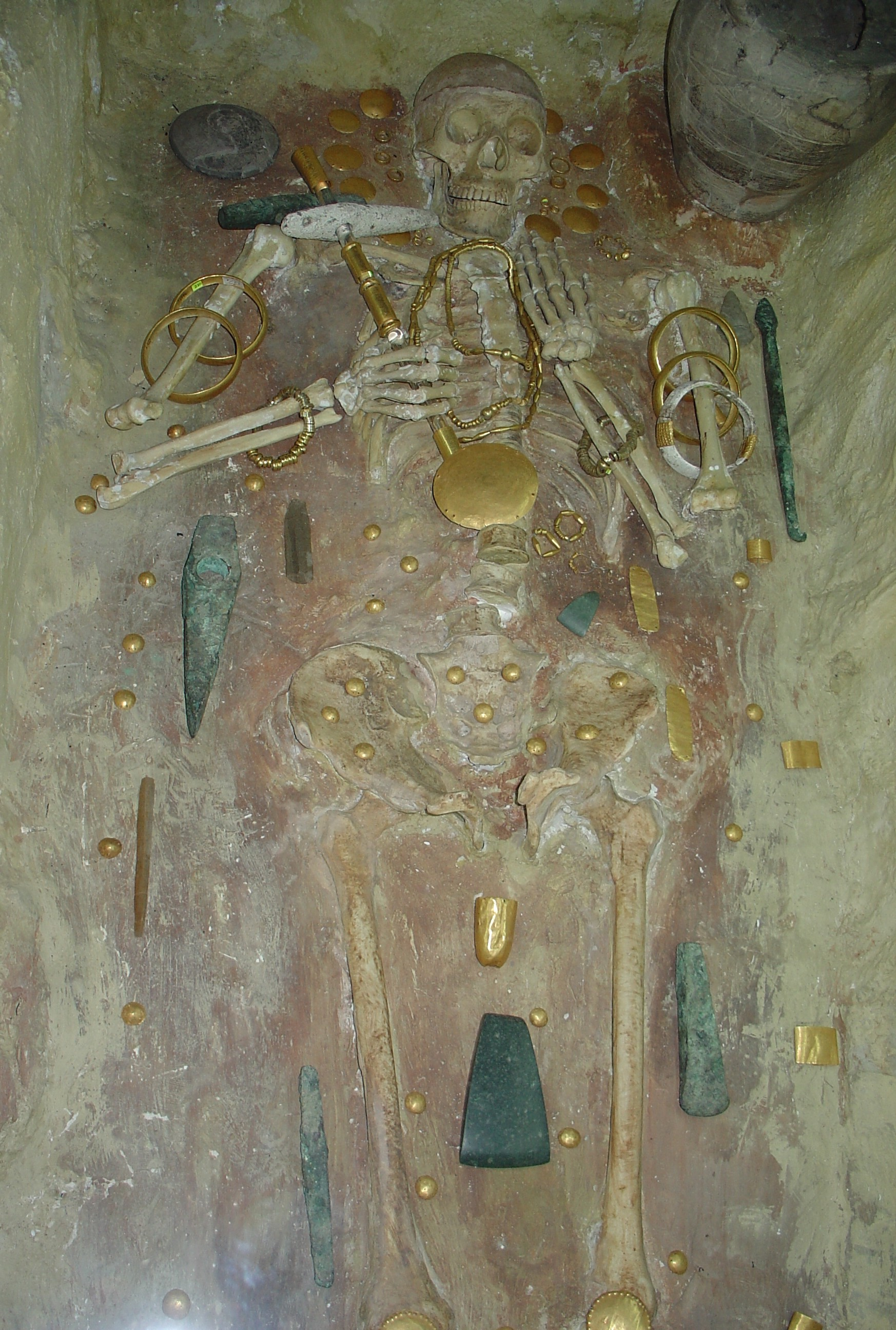
Tomb 43 at the Varna Necropolis contains some of the most ancient bijoux yet found

Body ornamentation predates that of writing. Some consider it as itself part of human evolution, and call it the Révolution Symbolique, the rise of Symbolic culture.

The oldest well-identified bijoux are some 45 pieces unearthed from Blombes, South Africa. These perforated and styled bijoux have been dated to being 75,000 years old.

Beyond Africa, Yvette Taborin has devoted her life to studying the use of language symbols in Europe. She divides her analysis of the first objects of interaction between people into two types: those that are simply to collect things, as hunter-gatherers do, and those that are deliberately made or modified to be ornaments. Taborin does not classify on which material or source these ornaments were made from.

Most paleoarcheology concentrates on remains of bodies themselves, such as fossils, or animal remains such as teeth. Taborin took a different tack, to investigate the remains of those around them. In doing so, she literally unearthed a whole new classification and understanding of our prehistoric ancestors, based on scientific evidence and statistics. For example, she established that the teeth used as ornaments in jewellery were not statistically correlated with the animals living thereabouts, neither browsers nor carnivores, so that they were specifically ornamental and not just "spare parts" after killing an animal to eat it.

Most ancient jewellery is of bone, ivory, antler or some soft stone (such as limestone or lignite). The diversity and manufacture of these pieces, then, indicates a significant development in human evolution, especially as it comes in such various forms (hairbands, placed in clothing, bracelets, anklets, and so forth).

=== Bronze Age ===
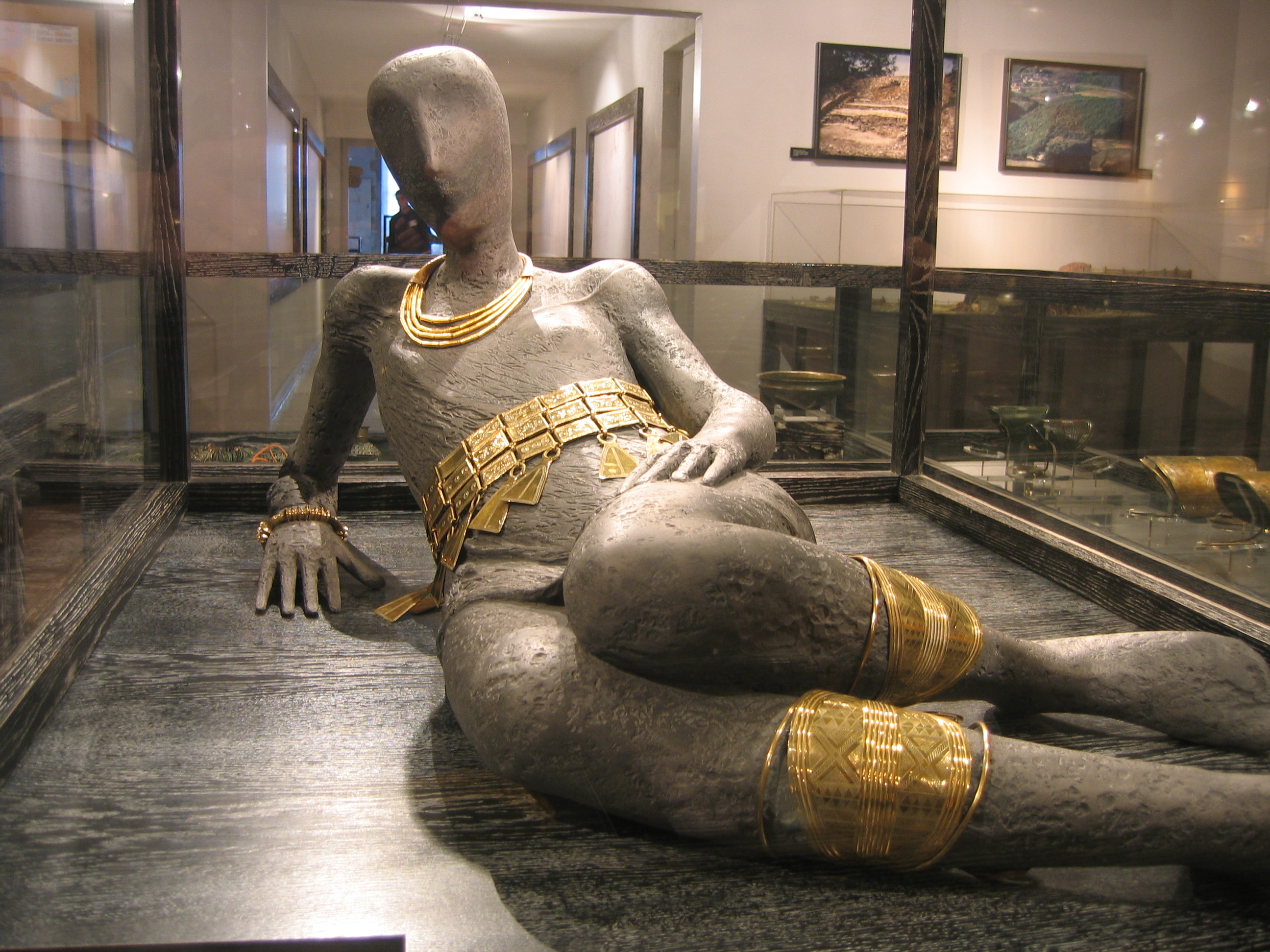
Sacred objects from Blanot, Côte-d'Or dating to the Bronze Age, now housed at the Archaeological Museum in Dijon

In Europe, the Celtic people were foremost in their work in bijou and filigree; strapwork variations on the celtic cross are still popular today.

Once metal had become part of the human way of life, and particularly during the Iron Age, various techniques such as filigree, embossing, and granulation were developed. An enormous variety of objects, of the highest quality, have been found. Bijouterie flourished in the civilisations around the Mediterranean Basin, and slowly but surely, bijouitiers established a trade and business, passing on their knowledge through guilds and adapting their wares to the tastes of their clients and the fashion of the day.

=== Recorded history ===
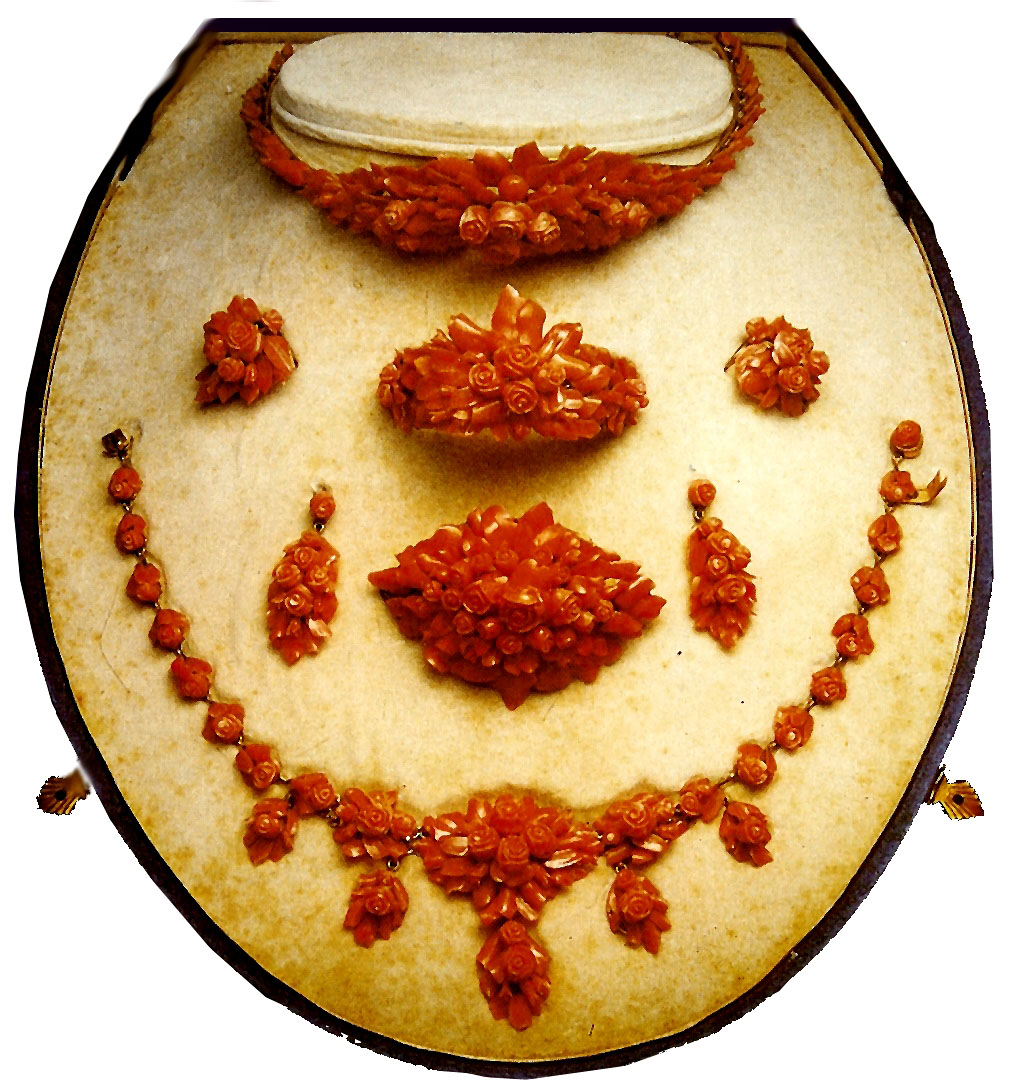
Coral bijou made for Queen Farida of Egypt(1938, Naples, at the Coral Jewellery Museum, Naples).

- In Ancient Egypt and contemporaneously but disparately in Western Africa, bijouterie was considered a form of high art.
- In the New World, Native Americans had a culture of making bijoux from gold. Christopher Columbus, indeed, ransacked much gold of this sort on his return to Portugal.

The art of bijouterie was pretty much stable, over many centuries, and reserved and codified as a profession.

- Metalworking techniques developed during the Industrial Revolution made bijoux affordable to all, so they were no longer considered mere luxuries for the rich.
- In the First World War, French soldiers wore bijoux carefully selected to indicate their rank and speciality.
  - These would often be made simply of iron or aluminium
- In the Second World War, the new industry of bijoux manufacture in France was paralysed; but they responded by producing bijoux patriotiques, with the emblems of regiments and other army units, to wear on their uniforms.
- After the second world war, in the optimistic spirit of the time, with more money, more hope, and more future, bijou once again became part of daily life as a way to express thanks and love.

== Modern day ==
After the 1950s, three distinct strands of the art developed:

- Joaillerie, made as one-off pieces or in limited editions, in precious metal and gemstones.
- Bijouterie fantaisie, made of many new materials such as plastic
- Bijouterie artisanale, again made as one-offs or in limited editions, but not of high-valued material.

== Modern classification ==
- Parure : A collection of several bijoux. often comprising those for the neck, head and arms.

=== Head and shoulder ===
- Couronne
- Boucle d'oreille or pendant d'oreille, earrings
  - Créole (bijou) (Creole)
  - Dormeuse (bijou) (Sleeping)
  - Poissarde
- Diadème (Diadomic)
- Coiffe de cygne (Swan neck)
- Épingle à chapeau (On a hat)
- Épingle à cheveux (In the hair)
- Ferronnière (metaphorically, after the painting by Leonardo da Vinci of the "Unknown Woman")
- Tiare (Tiara)
- Bijou dentaire (Teeth)
- Implant cornéen (literally, "Corneal implant")

=== Wrist and arms ===
- Anneau (bijou)
- Bague (bijou)
  - Alliance (bijou)
  - Chevalière (Horseman, cavalier)
  - Marquise (bague)
- Bouton de manchette (Buttonhole, specifically when used to put a decoration such as a flower or bijou)
- Bracelet
  - Gourmette or identity bracelet; dog tag
- Jonc
- Montre-bracelet (Watch strap)

=== Back ===
- Collier, collar
  - Je-ne-baise-plus (I don't sleep around any more)
  - Sautoir
  - Torque (collier) (Collar, roughly, choker)
  - Collier ras du cou (Literally, "From neck to arse")
- Pendentif

=== Chest ===
- Agrafe (bijou)
- Badge
- Broche (bijou)
- Épingle à cravate (Tie pin)
- Ferret (Aglet; a false friend)
- Fibule (On one's ribs)
- Pectoral
- Pin's

=== Elsewhere ===
- Amulette (Amulet)
- Bijou de peau (skin)
- Boîte à bijoux (tin, box of bijou)
- Boucle de ceinture (Navel stud: Navel piercing)
- Bracelet de cheville
- Breloque
- Camée
- Cassolette (small glass)
- Chaîne
  - Châtelaine
- Chapelet
- Médaille
- Médaillon
- Montre (Watch)
  - Montre-bracelet (Watch-chain)
  - Montre-gousset )(Watch-pocket or roughly Pocket watch)
- Piercing
- Pomander
- Solitaire, an item of jewellery that stands on its own

== Distinctions ==
A parure, if made since the 18th century, should be an ensemble (assembly) of several bijoux:

- The petite parure has a piece for the neck, and earrings, and a brooch
- The grande parure has those plus a diadem and two bracelets.

== Sources ==
- Cartlidge, Barbara (1986). Les bijoux au XXieme (in French). Paris: Payot. p. 239. ISBN 2-228-00110-4.
- Mazloum, Claude (1993). Designer jewellery: the world's top artists. Rome: Gremese International. ISBN 88-7301-021-0.

== See also ==
- Fashion accessories
- Costume jewelry
