= John Baptist Chatelain =

French-English draughtsman and engraver (1710–1758)

John Baptist Chatelain (1710–1758) was an English draughtsman and engraver of French background, specialized in landscapes.

He should not be confused with, among others, F.-B. Chatelain (fl. 1760–1770), who was a pupil of Louis-Simon Lempereur and Claude-Jean-Baptiste Chatelain, French engraver and revolutionary.

== Life ==
Chatelain was born in London into a Huguenot family, surname Phillippe, and changed his name later in life. He died in May 1758, as shown in an advertisement placed by William Bellers. Older sources give very different accounts.

== Works ==
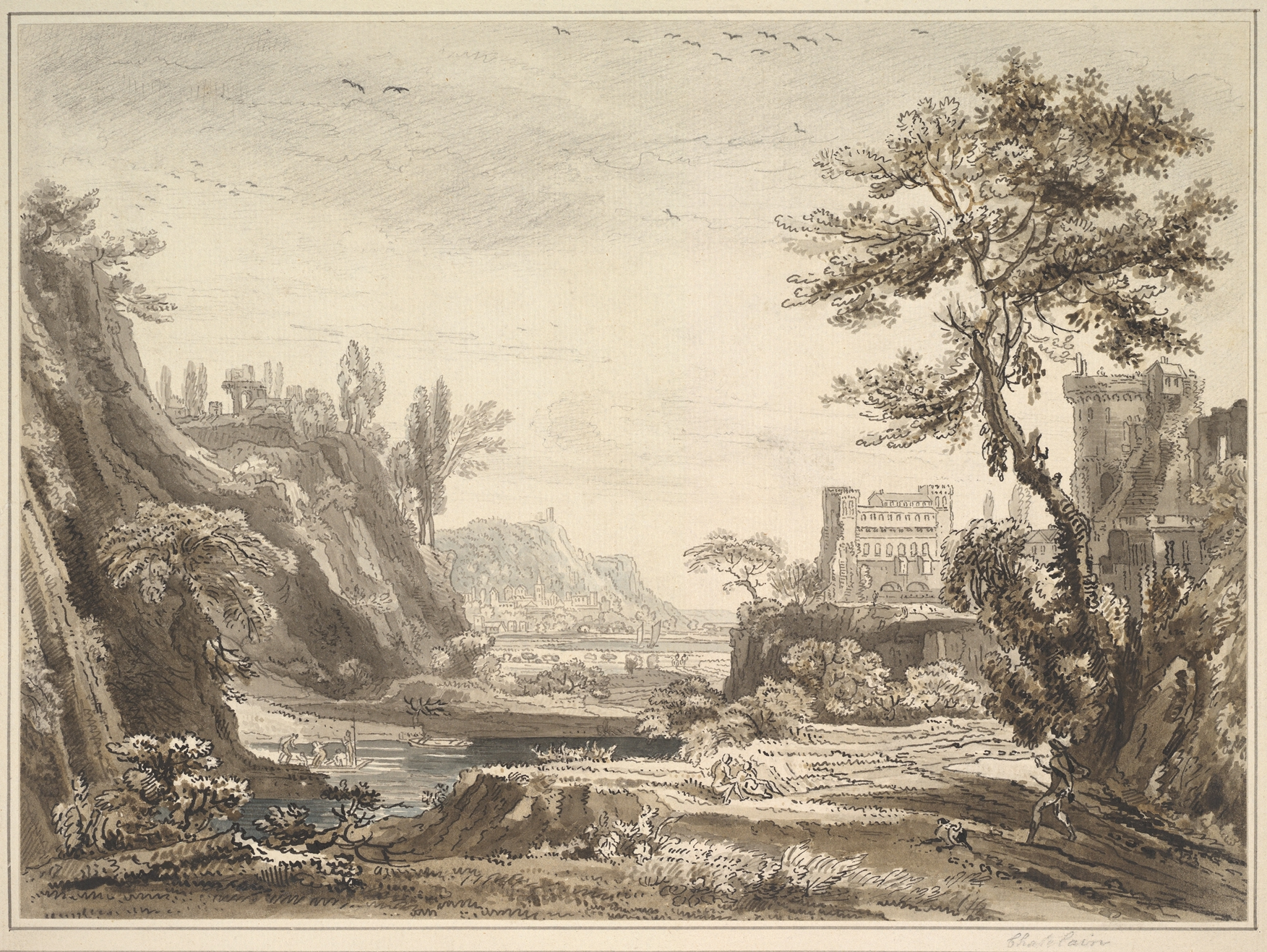
A Classical Landscape, pen, ink and wash by Chatelain.

Chatelain was employed by Boydell, especially in engraving with François Vivares the series of landscapes after Claude, Rembrandt, Guaspre, and others. Vivares being more appreciated by the public, his name was often placed on plates engraved by Chatelain alone, as in the case of a fine landscape after Pietro da Cortona, and another named 'The Storm,' in which Poussin has introduced the story of Pyramus and Thisbe. He engraved, also for Boydell, eleven views in London and in Italy. He died in London in 1771. The following list comprises his most important works:

- The Four Times of the Day; etched by Chatelain, afterwards finished in mezzotint by Houston.
- Eight Landscapes; after Gaspard Poussin.
- A Landscape; after Rembrandt.
- Eight Views of the Lakes in Cumberland and Westmoreland; after Bellers.
- Three Landscapes; after Pietro da Cortona, N. Poussin, and F. Bolognese.
- Portrait of Crébillon.
- Portrait of Meunier de Querlon.

== Notes ==
Attribution:
