= François-Rolland Elluin =

French engraver

François-Rolland Elluin (5 May 1745, Abbeville – c. 1810, Paris) was a French engraver, notoriously known for his illustrations of erotic scenes.

== Life ==
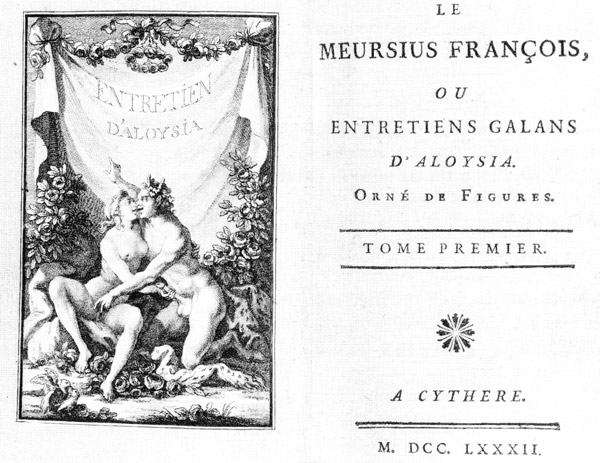
Le Meursius Francois, ou Entretiens Galans D'Aloysia (1782)

The son of a merchant, he moved at a young age to Paris, where he lived with his relative, the engraver Jacques Firmin Beauvarlet, of whom he became a pupil. There he produced some so-called "serious" prints after François Boucher, Luca Giordano, Jean-Baptiste Greuze, and Charles-François-Adrien Macret; then, introduced into gallant circles, he made many portraits of actors and actresses. He then joined forces with the merchant-bookseller Hubert Martin Cazin and the vignetting artist Antoine Borel to devote himself to the engraving of licentious subjects.

Elluin produced series of illustrations for La Tentation de Saint Antoine by Michel-Jean Sedaine, the Histoire de Dom Bougre by Jean-Charles Gervaise de Latouche, L'Arétin français by François-Félix Nogaret, Félicia ou Mes Fredaines by Andréa de Nerciat, Parapilla by Charles Borde, La Foutro-manie by Gabriel Sénac de Meilhan, L'Académie des dames by Nicolas Chorier, La Fille de joie, ou Mémoires de Miss Fanny by John Cleland, as well as for Cantiques et pots-pourris and Thérèse philosophe.

"One cannot refuse to the works illustrated by Borel and Elluin a certain value", write Roger Portalis and Henri Béraldi, while considering that "Elluin's touch is heavy, without enthusiasm". These two art historians also judge his portraits "without great skill or artistic value" and conclude: "Elluin, in short, except in some of his erotic vignettes to which he applied himself particularly, as to a work which pleased him, was only a very ordinary engraver".

== Gallery ==
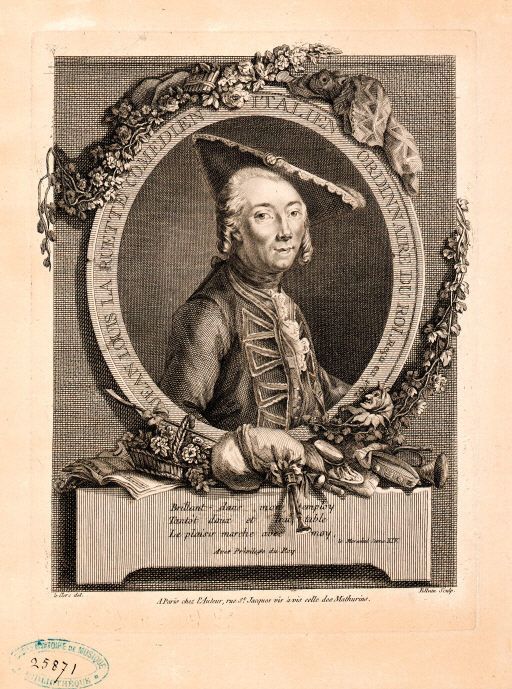
Jean-Louis La Ruette
French singer and composer; after Sébastien Leclerc.

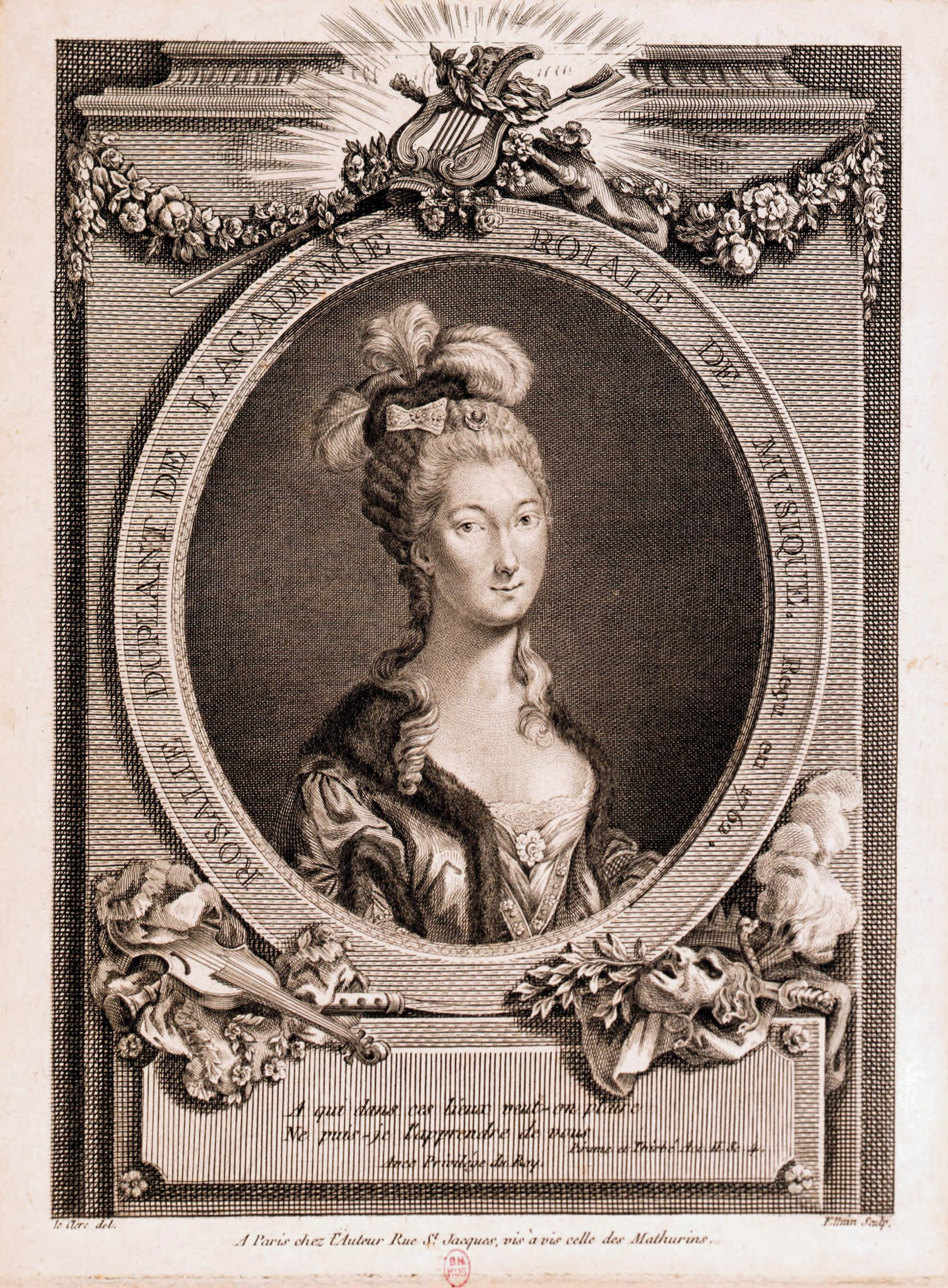
Rosalie Duplant
opera singer; after Sébastien Leclerc.

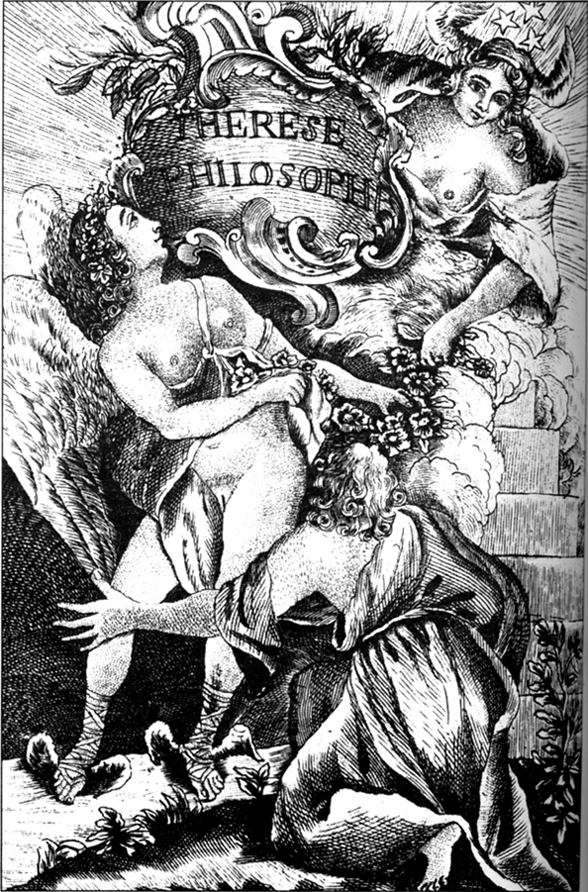
Thérèse philosophe
variously attributed to Denis Diderot, Jean-Baptiste Boyer d'Argens, Xavier d'Arles de Montigny, Théodore-Henri de Tschudi.

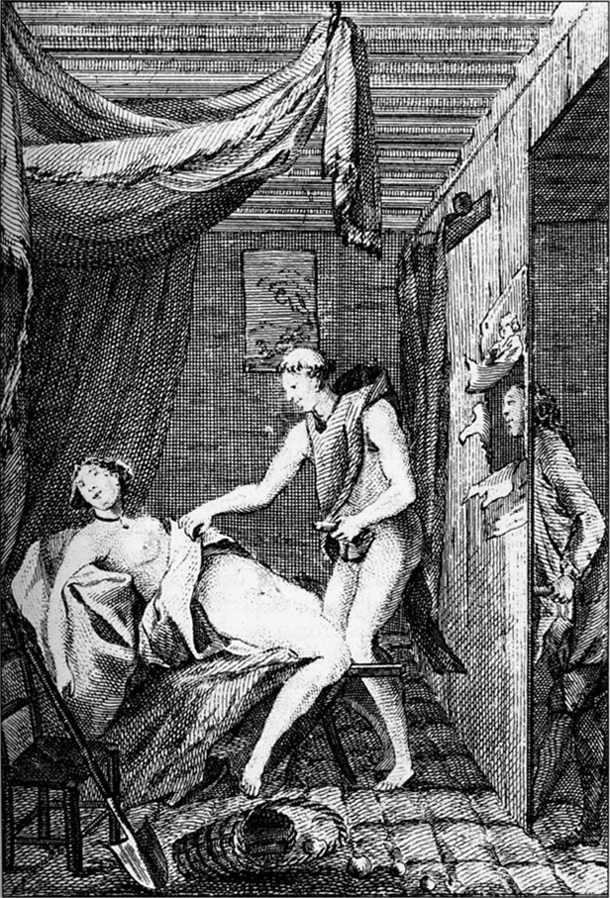
Histoire de Dom Bougre
by Jean-Charles Gervaise de Latouche.

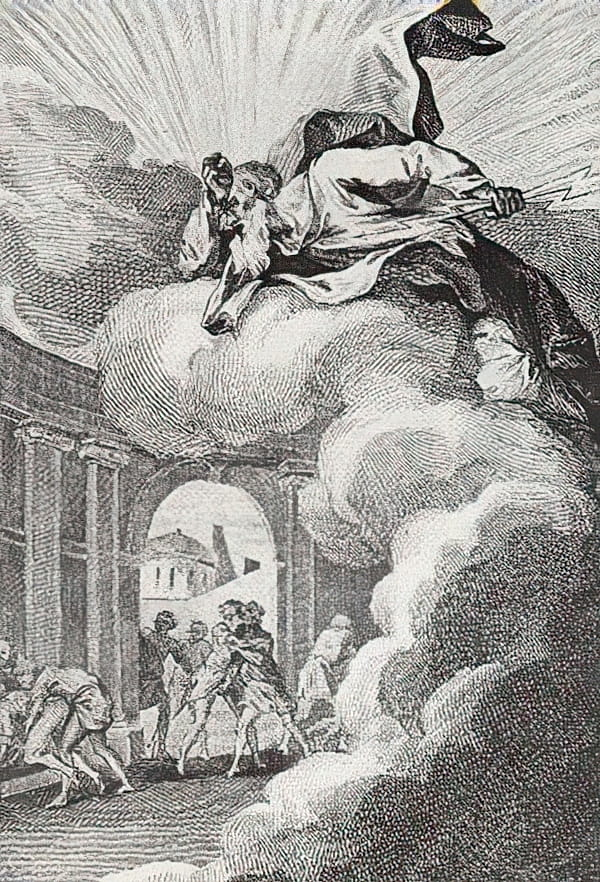
Sodomites provoquant la colère divine
(Sodomites causing God's wrath) in Le Pot-Pourri de Loth by the anonymous author of Cantiques et pots-pourris.

== Bibliography ==
- Oliver, Valerie Cassel, ed. (2011). "Elluin, François Rolland". In Benezit Dictionary of Artists. Oxford University Press.
- Portalis, Roger and Beraldi, Henri (1881). Les Graveurs du dix-huitième siècle. Vol. 1. Paris: Damascène Morgand and Charles Fatout.
