= Jolyot =

Jolyot (pronounced [ʒɔljo]) is a surname. Notable people with the surname include:

- Claude Prosper Jolyot de Crébillon (1707–1777), French novelist
- Pascal Jolyot (born 1958), French fencer
- Prosper Jolyot de Crébillon (1674–1762), French poet and tragedian
