= William Hatchett =

William Hatchett (1701 – 1760s) was an English translator, dramatist and pamphleteer. He was born and went to school in York, but by the late 1720s was living in London, where he remained for most of his life. Hatchett appears to have been a long-time partner of Eliza Haywood; some of Hatchett’s works were also either co-written with, or published by, Haywood.

== Translator ==
Hatchett's first three works were translations of substantial French works: Jean-Paul Bignon's Les aventures d’Abdalla, fils d’Hanif (The Adventures of Abdalla, Son of Hanif) (1728), Anne-Thérèse de Marguenat de Courcelles, Marquise de Lambert's Avis d’une mere à son fils et à sa fille (Advice from a mother to her son and daughter) (1728), and Giovanni Battista, conte di Comazzi's Morale dei principi osservata (The Morals of Princes) (1729), a work that Haywood subscribed to. In March 1742, Hatchett collaborated with Haywood on the translation of Claude-Prosper Jolyot de Crébillon’s Le Sopha (The Sopha), an erotic novel that was banned in France.

== Dramatist ==
In 1730, Hatchett translated and both Haywood and Hatchett acted in The Rival Father, an adaptation of Thomas Corneille's La Mort d’Achille (1673). In 1733, Haywood and Hatchett converted Henry Fielding's Tragedy of Tragedies, or Tom Thumb the Great into a ballad-opera, with music by John Frederick Lampe, under the title The Opera of Operas. Hatchett co-produced the opera, which was a great success. In May 1738, John Frederick Lampe unsuccessfully sued Hatchett and others involved in the production for money he believed was due to him. In 1737, Hatchett and Haywood appear to have been members of Fielding's Company of Comedians. Hatchett wrote and Haywood acted in A Rehearsal of Kings. In January 1740, Hatchett issued a prospectus for the publication of his works, but only issued The Chinese Orphan (1741) an adaptation of Joseph Henri Marie de Prémare’s French translation of a Chinese play of the Yuan dynasty (1260–1368) (The Orphan of Zhao).

== Pamphleteer ==
In 1730, Hatchett became embroiled in the activities of Monsieur de Montaud, a Frenchman trying to sell State secrets. Hatchett describes these events in An Appeal to All Lovers of Their Country and Reputation (1731). In 1736, Hatchett went on an extensive summer holiday with Bryan Dawson, who appears to have been acting as a patron to Hatchett for some time. At the end of this tour Hatchett signed a promissory note to Dawson for the sum of 56 pounds. In 1741, Dawson sued Hatchett for this debt; Hatchett responded with an account of Dawson’s actions in A Remarkable Cause on a Note of Hand (1742). Most of what is known concerning Hatchett appears in this autobiographical pamphlet.

== Later life ==
Hatchett continued to be involved in theatre throughout the 1740s. In the first half of 1748 he was involved in Fielding’s Panton Street puppet show and in April 1749 he shared a benefit at Covent Garden Theatre. In December 1749, he is mentioned by a number of witnesses as having been involved in the distribution of Haywood’s A Letter from H[enr]y G[orin]g (1750). Hatchett may have lived into the 1760s, as it is possible that he was the source for David Erskine Baker’s biographical sketch of Haywood, which was published in 1764.
