= Vagina loquens =

Media trope about a talking vagina

The vagina loquens, Latin for "talking vagina", is a significant tradition in literature and art, dating back to the ancient folklore motif of the "talking cunt". These tales usually involve vaginas talking due to the effect of magic or charms, and often admitting to their unchastity. Another tradition is a vagina that acquires the power of speech to play the role of informant and reveal a history of previous lovers.

== History ==
Talking vaginas are an early theme in French literature, most notably in the 13th-century fabliau Le Chevalier qui faisoit parler les cons et les culs, and in Les bijoux indiscrets, the first novel by Denis Diderot. Published anonymously in 1748, Les bijoux indiscrets (The Indiscreet Jewels) is an allegory that portrays Louis XV as the sultan Mangogul of the Congo who owns a magic ring that makes women's genitals ("jewels") talk. A comparable trope that Diderot must have known is found in the ribald fabliau.

In American literature, a talking vagina is featured in the Ozark folktale The Magic Walking Stick, in which vaginas are made to act as informants.

== Contemporary usage ==
In modern art, the talking vagina theme is featured prominently in the works of Stephanie Sarley in a subset of her "Crotch Monster" series. The talking vagina characters are depicted as anthropomorphized vulvae reacting emotionally and engaging in various activities.

The talking vagina theme is the central trope of the 1996 play The Vagina Monologues.

The pornographic film Le Sexe qui parle (1975), its sequel (1978), and its non-pornographic remake, Chatterbox, feature talking vaginas.

On television, Debi Mae West (in parody of Joan Rivers) portrayed Princess Clara's talking vagina, Vajoana, on Drawn Together.

== See also ==
- Vagina and vulva in art
- Vagina dentata
