= Les Égarements du cœur et de l'esprit =

Book by Crébillon fils

Les Égarements du cœur et de l'esprit ou Mémoires de M. de Meilcour
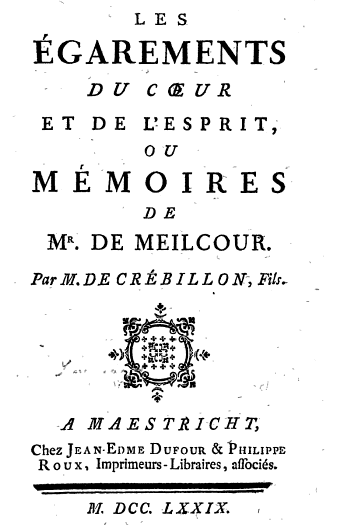
- 1779 Maastricht edition
- Author: Claude Prosper Jolyot de Crébillon
- Language: French
- Genre: Libertine novel
- Published: 1736-1738
- Publication place: France

Les Égarements du cœur et de l'esprit ou Mémoires de M. de Meilcour (French: Strayings of the Heart and Mind, or Memoirs of M. de Meilcour) is a novel by Crébillon fils, which appeared in three parts from 1736 to 1738. It is apparently unfinished, though critics differ on whether this was a deliberate decision of the author or whether he intended to finish it.

It concerns the "education" of a rich young nobleman, M. de Meilcour, at the hands of characters including his first lover, the middle-aged Mme de Lursay; his mentor, the libertine Versac; the female libertine Mme de Sénanges; and his true love, the young and virtuous Hortense de Théville.

Pierre Choderlos de Laclos may have included an allusion to Les Égarements in his novel Les Liaisons dangereuses, in naming a minor character Vressac.

The novel was translated into English as The Wanderings of the Heart and Mind in 1751, and by Barbara Bray as The Wayward Head and Heart in 1963.

== Bibliography ==
- Title: Les égarements du coeur et de l'esprit; ou, Mémoires de Mr. de Meilcour
- Author Claude-Prosper Jolyot de Crébillon
- Editor Dufour, 1779
- 346 pages
