= William Bellers =

English landscape painter

William Bellers (fl. 1749–1773) was an English landscape painter.

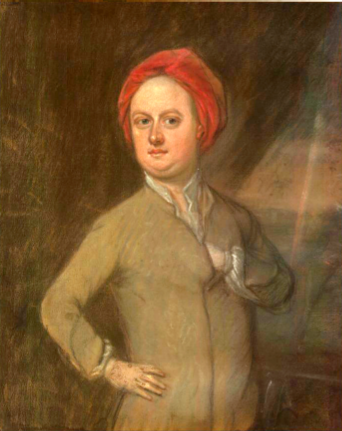
William Bellers, self-portrait

== Life ==
Bellers worked in London in the second half of the 18th century. Between the years 1761 and 1773, he was a frequent contributor of paintings, and tinted and crayoned drawings to the exhibitions of the Free Society of Artists; in these works the effects of sunset, moonlight, and storm play a prominent part.

Eight views of the Cumberland and Westmoreland lakes were engraved after him by J. S. Müller, Chatelain, Charles Grignion the Elder, Canot, and James Mason, and published by Boydell in 1774; and a set of 10 English landscapes by him was etched by Peter Paul Benazech, James Mason, G. Bickham, and James Peake. There is also a view of Netley Abbey engraved after him by J. Toms and J. Mason.

The dates of Bellers' birth and death are not known.
