= Gourmette =

Type of bracelet

In France, a gourmette is a jewellery chain in the form of a plait, of which the plaits have rough and smooth sides. On the smooth side, at the front, the wearer tends to have a small badge with their Christian name etched thereon. Usually, it is designed so that the wearer can read the inscription on the badge.

A gourmette is most often worn so that, if lost or in trouble, others can find the wearer's name and give or summon help. It is usually given on baptism. It can be made of any material, but traditionally is of silver.

The word "gourmette" was also used in French West Africa to mean an African woman who was a Christian, often the mistress of a European.

== See also ==
- Dog tag
