= Yvette Taborin =

French archaeologist (1929–2020)

- Born: 16 May 1929
- Died: 8 September 2020 (aged 91)
- Occupations: Archaeologist; Professor

Yvette Taborin (16 May 1929 – 8 September 2020) was a French archaeologist and professor at the University of Paris 1 Pantheon-Sorbonne.

== Biography ==
Taborin studied ethnology under André Leroi-Gourhan. She defended her thesis, titled Les Coquillages dans la parure paléolithique en France, in 1987. She then became a professor of archaeology at the University of Paris 1. She led excavations near Étiolles from 1972 to 2000. She was one of the first people to take an interest in the archaeological excavation of shells, called archeomalacology.

Yvette Taborin died on 8 September 2020 at the age of 91.

== Publications ==
- Les Coquillages dans la parure paléolithique en France (1987)
- La parure en coquillage au Paléolithique (1993)
- Les sociétés de la préhistoire (1998)
- Langage sans parole : la parure aux temps préhistoriques (2004)
