= The Sofa: A Moral Tale =

1742 novel by Claude Prosper Jolyot de Crébillon

The Sofa: A Moral Tale (French: Le Sopha, conte moral) is a 1742 libertine novel by Claude Prosper Jolyot de Crébillon. It was first translated into English in the spring of 1742 in an edition published by John Nourse and Thomas Cooper. This translation has been attributed to Eliza Haywood and William Hatchett.

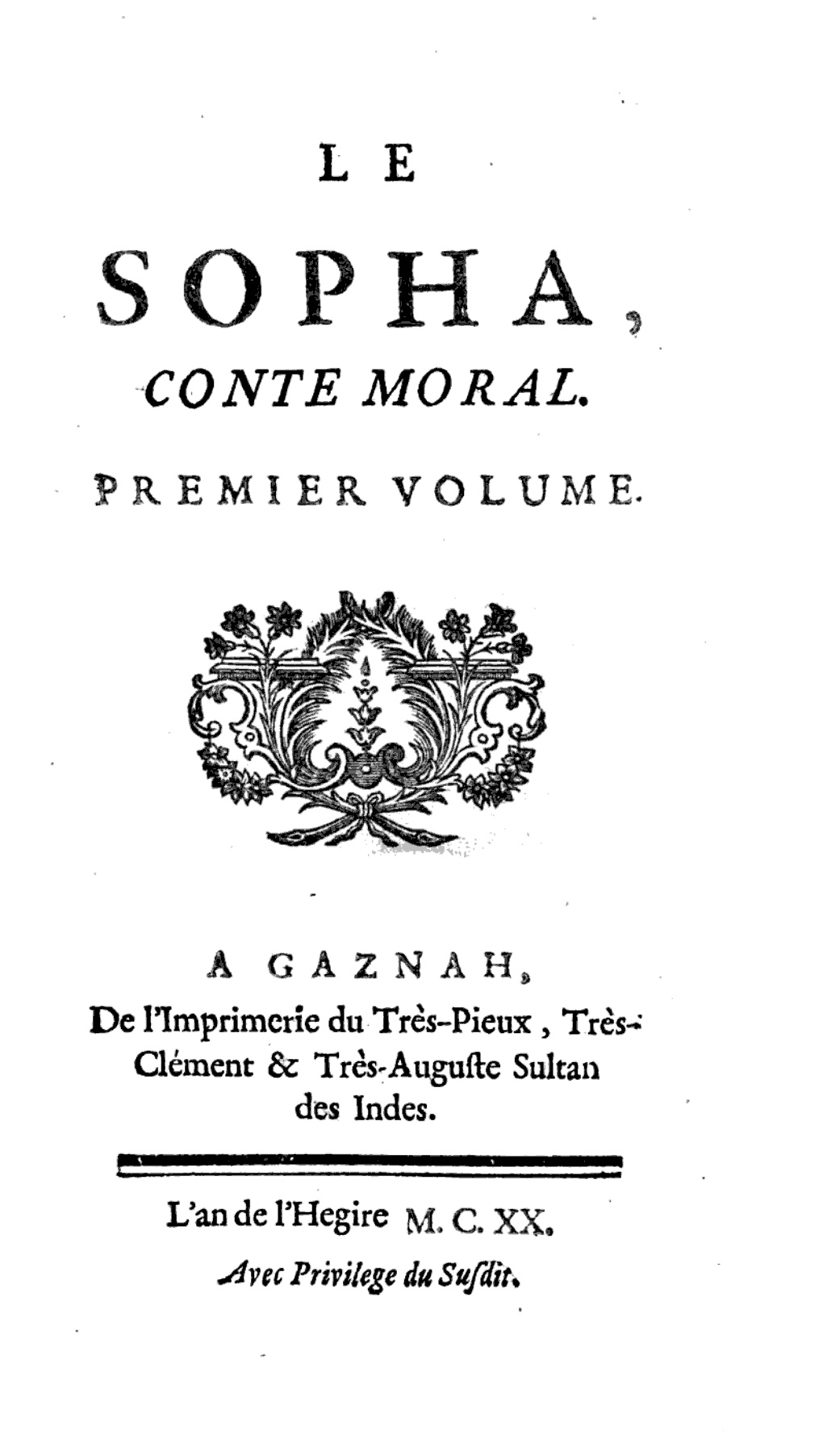
The Sofa: A Moral Tale

The story concerns a young courtier, Amanzéï, whose soul in a previous life was condemned by Brahma to inhabit a series of sofas, and not to be reincarnated in a human body until two virgin lovers had consummated their passion upon the sofa he "inhabited." The novel is structured as a frame story in an oriental setting, explicitly evocative of the Arabian Nights, in which Amanzéï recounts the adventures of seven couples, which he witnessed in his sofa form, to the bored sultan Shah Baham (grandson of Shehryār and Scheherazade). The longest episode, that of Zulica, takes up nine chapters; the final episode concerns the teenage Zéïnis and Phéléas. Amanzéï, witnessing their innocent pleasure, is edified and freed through the experience of virtuous love.

Many of the characters in the novel are satirical portraits of influential and powerful Parisians of Crébillon's time; the author takes the opportunity to ridicule hypocrisy in its different forms (worldly respectability, virtue, religious devotion). In particular, some recognize Louis XV in the figure of the ridiculous Shah Baham. Although the book was published anonymously and with a false imprint, Crébillon was discovered to be the author and was exiled to a distance of thirty leagues from Paris on April 7, 1742. He was able to return on July 22, after claiming that the work had been commissioned by Frederick II of Prussia and that it had been published against his will.

Le Sopha was translated into English by Haywood and Hatchett in 1742, by Bonamy Dobrée in 1927, and by Martin Kamin in 1930 (as The Divan: A Morality Story).

Le Sopha is visible as the title of a book in The Toilette, one of William Hogarth's series of satirical paintings Marriage à-la-mode, made 1743–1745. It is also the book that Mr. Mercaptan, who calls his own sofa Crébillon, gives to Rosie in Aldous Huxley's Antic Hay.
