= Jean-Charles Gervaise de Latouche =

French writer

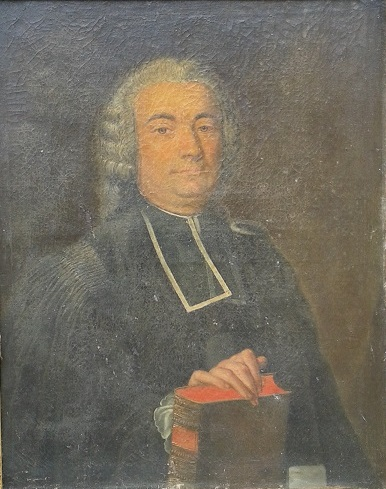
Jean-Charles Gervaise de Latouche.jpg

Jean-Charles Gervaise de Latouche (26 November 1715 in Amiens – 28 November 1782) was a French writer. He was a lawyer at the Parlement of Paris of the Ancien Régime.

The authorship of the licentious books Mémoires de Mademoiselle de Bonneval (1738), Histoire de Dom Bougre, Portier des Chartreux (1741), and possibly also Lyndamine, ou, L'optimisme des pays chauds (1778) has been attributed to him.

== Works ==
- Mémoires de Mademoiselle de Bonneval écrits par M***, 1738 at French Wikisource
- Histoire de Dom Bougre, portier des Chartreux, écrite par lui-même, Arles, Actes Sud, 1993 ISBN 2-7427-0029-3 at French Wikisource
