= Stephanie Sarley =

American artist

- Born: June 21, 1988 (age 37) (Note: Sarley's birthday is June 21. She was 27 years old on March 10, 2016.); Berkeley, California, United States
- Occupations: Artist; multimedia artist; video artist; illustrator; photographer
- Website: stephaniesarley.com

Stephanie Sarley (born June 21, 1988) is a contemporary American multimedia artist known for her surrealistic humor.

An illustrator, printmaker, and video artist, Sarley is inspired by the "psychology of kink". She is best known for her "fruit art videos", which appeared on Instagram beginning in late 2015. Additionally, she is known for creating a series of flower-themed and talking vaginas known as "Orcunts" and "Crotch Monsters." She is the author of the adult coloring book Dick Dog and Friends.

Her work has been exhibited internationally.

== Early life ==
Sarley was born in Berkeley, California, and grew up in the San Francisco Bay Area. There she was raised by a family of artists who tended to take her to museums in the San Francisco area to "draw from the masters." Her father is a storyboard artist in Hollywood and her grandfather took part in the art scene as well. Her mother directed "Women in Film," a film festival. Sarley studied and apprenticed in classical arts, eventually studying print-making at Laney College in Oakland. Sarley knew she wanted to be an artist by the time she was 11 years old. "When I was young, I studied the masters but I didn't realize at the time the masters were only men", she said. "I didn't have that perspective at the time."

== Artwork ==
With a background consisting of traditional fine arts apprenticeships such as printmaking, stone-sculpting, and tattooing, Sarley has worked professionally as an artist for almost a decade. In 2013, Sarley began working primarily in the digital medium.

Sarley is best known for her fruit-art videos.

Sarley has been known to depict women's sexuality through her artwork, specifically her "food porn" videos and photography. Sarley states, "My work is about representing raw femininity in the arts." Regarding Instagram's removal of her page and photos, Sarley has stated "Removing my photos from social media has given my art an extra dimension. It has become a form of protest. " Sarley views vaginas as "the centre of life" and believes that shouldn't be viewed "as a threat, something to censor, or exploit."

On recalling the creation of her first fruit video, Sarley described it as "a spontaneous primal urge". As the series went on, the films began to inspire countless copycats.

Sarley's work is best recognized by multiple illustrative constructs. Some examples are the "crotch monsters", anthropomorphized vulvae, the "orcunts": part orchids, part vaginas, and the fruit art videos.

Sarley's artwork deals with issues surrounding sexism, censorship, and women's empowerment.

== Publications ==
In 2013, Sarley published the adult coloring book Dick Dog And Friends which had been distributed via the Last Gasp.

Several publications have featured Sarley's art including Hatezine, art Das Kunstmagazin, and Elle Brazil. Sarely's art has also appeared in the "munchies" section of Vice Magazine.

In 2016 Artsy magazine recognized Sarley as one of the "8 Women Who Turned Food into Feminist Art."

== Reception ==
Sarley has been referred to as the "patron saint of vagina drawings." Critics have compared her work to Gustave Courbet, Egon Schiele, Georgia O'Keeffe. Betty Tompkins, Andy Warhol, and Joan Semmel. Noted art critics have praised her videos, some calling it "Genius," in print and online.

Sarley's Instagram account has been disabled numerous times for "sexually explicit content" regarding her fruit videos. Sarley struggled with copyright over her original clips, and received negative comments from followers over the explicit nature of her work. After informing Instagram about this, the company shut down her account over its “sexually suggestive” content. Her account has been restored due to community pressure on instagram.

Miley Cyrus was accused of plagiarizing Sarley's work in promotional videos for her EP, She Is Coming. The media recognized that the promotions were a copy of Sarley's "fruit porn". Sarley, however, has not been contacted by Cyrus or any Cyrus representatives.

== Feminism ==
Sarley believes that women "haven’t been represented in the arts and now it’s just normalized." Sarley states that "[her] art challenges the gender confines men and women have to deal with."

One of Sarley’s recent group exhibitions at the Museum Der Dinge in Berlin featured work that explored “modern-day feminism and how that translates into sexuality and personal agency."

== In popular culture ==
- The controversy surrounding her Instagram was mentioned in Harper's Magazine's weekly review for March 15, 2016.
- Sarley's fruit art was featured on several Canal+ French television shows including L'Émission d'Antoine.
- Cosmopolitan named Sarley as one of the Twenty Best Vagina Moments of 2016.
- Calvin Klein has been noted for being heavily influenced by Sarley's work in one of their advertisement series.
- Loewe's spring/summer campaign of 2017, photographed by Steven Meisel is recognized for being in the style of Sarley's work.
