= Anne-Gabriel Meusnier de Querlon =

French man of letters

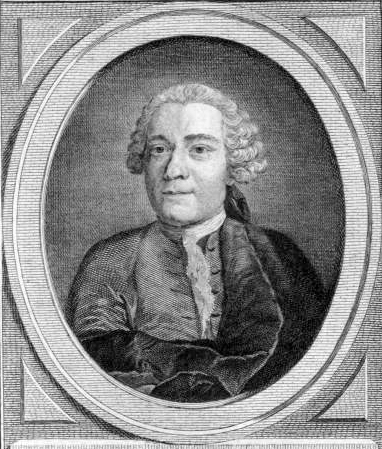
- Meusnier de Querlon
- Born: 15 April 1702; Nantes
- Died: 15 April 1780 (aged 78); Paris
- Occupations: Playwright; Librarian

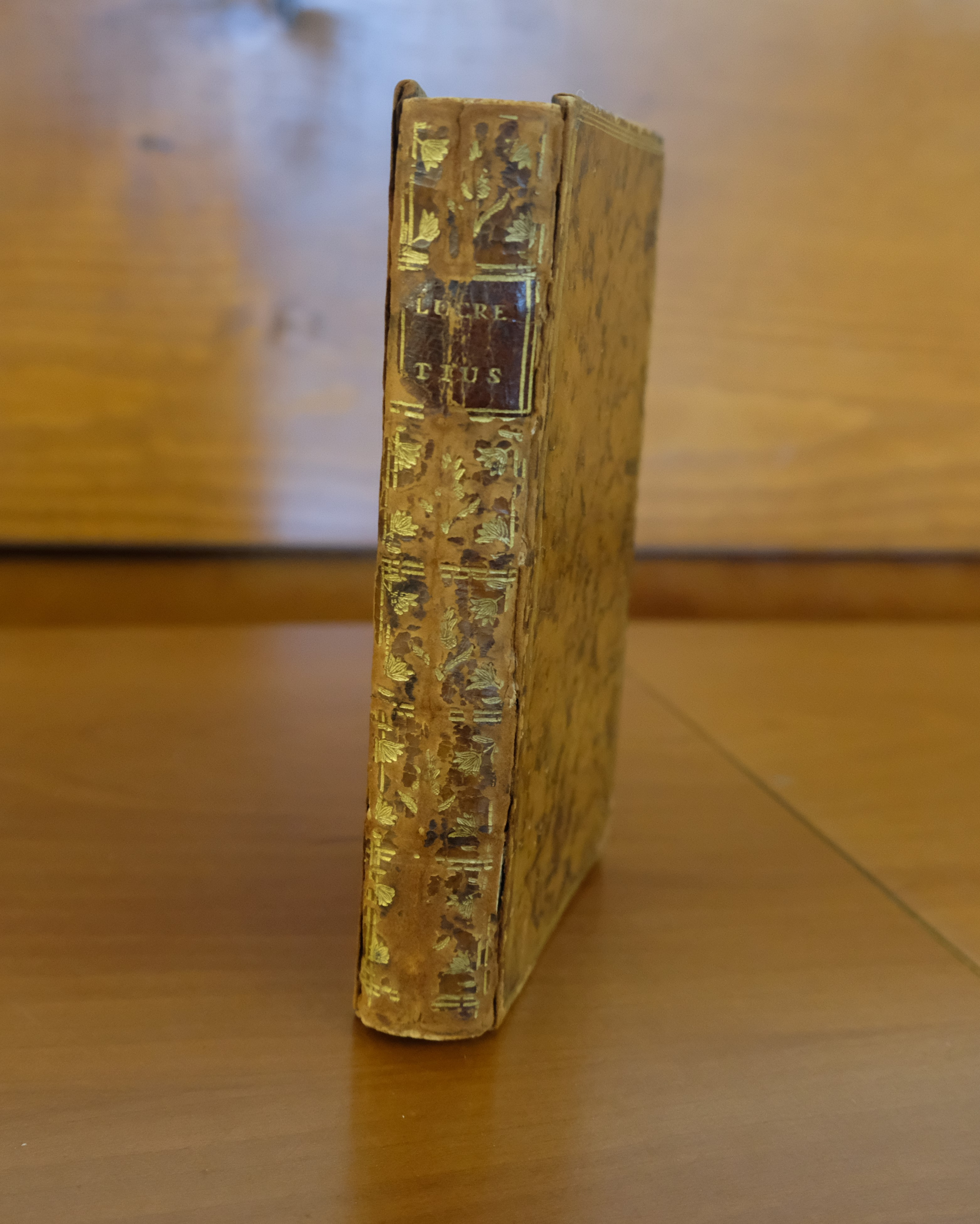
1754 copy of "De rerum natura," for which Meusnier de Querlon wrote the preface and provided notes

Anne-Gabriel Meusnier de Querlon 15 April 1702 – 12 April 1780) was an 18th-century French man of letters.

== Biography ==
Admitted a lawyer at the Parlement of Paris in 1723, Meusnier de Querlon was an employee from 1727 to 1735 at the Bibliothèque du Roi. From 1752 to 1776, he had the privilege of the Affiches de province, which he made a literary collection that was successful. At the same time, he worked at the Gazette de France during five years, at the Journal économique and the Journal étranger.

He also had the privilege of the Affiches de province, in which he wrote articles with Coste and abbot de Fontenai. He mainly praised Charles Palissot de Montenoy. He was a man of letters, a journalist and fine publisher, with fairly extensive knowledge, granting letters a special place because he was not interested in money or fame. His passion for the letters was pure and of great value since he worked tirelessly. However, Jean-François de La Harpe represented Querlon in verbose having "flatly bourgeois or ridiculously burlesque style, with ads for books to buy or homes for sale."

We owe him Psaphion ou la Courtisane de Smyrne, novel (London; Paris, 1748, in-12°); le Roman du jour (Ibid. , 1754, 2 vol. in-12+); Mémoires de M de*** pour servir à l'histoire du XVIIe (Amsterdam; Paris, 1759, 2 vol. in-12°); Journal historique de la campagne de Dantzig en 1734 (Ibid., 1761, in-12°); etc.

He edited with notes, Lucrèce (1748; in-12°); Phèdre (1748, in-12°); Anacréon (1754, in-12+); De rerum natura (1754); l'Anthologie française by Monet (1765, 3 vol. in-8°), etc.

In collaboration with Surgy, he gave the Continuation de l'histoire des voyages, by abbot Prévost (3 vol.). As a publisher, he realised in 1774 the original edition of the Journal de voyage en Italie en 1580 & 1581 by Michel de Montaigne, whose manuscript had been discovered by abbot Prunis.

He was also attributed the libertine novel The Carmelite Extern Nun (Histoire de la tourière des carmélites in French).

== Works (in English translation) ==
- Histoire de la Tourière des Carmelites (The Carmelite Extern Nun). In English translation: Theresa the Philosopher & The Carmelite Extern Nun. Sunny Lou Publishing. 2021. ISBN 978-1-955392-02-0.

== Sources ==
- Dictionnaire des Lettres Françaises. Le XVIIIe, édition revue et mise à jour sous la direction de François Moureau, Fayard et Librairie Générale Française, 1995 (ISBN 2-253-05665-0)
- Gustave Vapereau, Dictionnaire universel des littératures, Paris, Hachette, 1876, (p. 1672)
