= Prosper Jolyot de Crébillon =

French poet and tragedian (1674–1762)

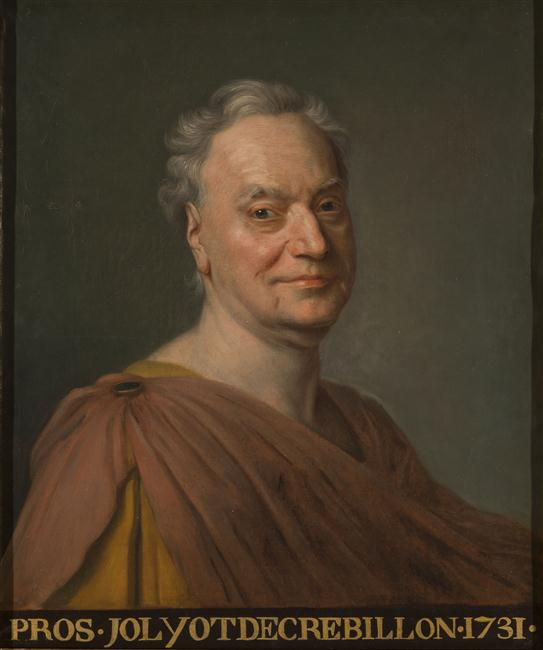
Prosper Jolyot de Crébillon

Prosper Jolyot de Crébillon (pronounced [pʁɔspɛʁ ʒɔljo də kʁebijɔ̃]; 13 January 1674 – 17 June 1762) was a French poet and tragedian.

He is sometimes known as Crébillon père or Crébillon le Tragique (Crébillon the Tragic) to distinguish him from his son Claude Prosper Jolyot de Crébillon (Crébillon the Gay).

== Biography ==
Crébillon was born in Dijon, where his father, Melchior Jolyot, was notary-royal. Having been educated at the Jesuit school in the town, and afterwards at the Collège Mazarin. He became an advocate, and was placed in the office of a lawyer named Prieur at Paris. With the encouragement of his master, son of an old friend of Scarron's, he produced a Mort des enfants de Brutus, which was never produced on the stage.

In 1705 he succeeded with Idoménée; in 1707 his Atrée et Thyeste was repeatedly acted at court; Electre appeared in 1709; and in 1711 he produced his finest play, Rhadamiste et Zénobie, considered as his masterpiece despite a complicated and over-involved plot. But his Xerxes (1714) was only performed once and his Sémiramis (1717) was an absolute failure.

In 1707 Crébillon had married a penniless girl, who died, leaving him two young children. His father had also died, insolvent. In three years at court he had gained nothing and aroused considerable envy. Oppressed with melancholy, he moved to a garret, where he surrounded himself with dogs, cats and birds, which he had befriended; he became utterly careless of cleanliness or food, and sought comfort only in smoking.

He returned to the stage in 1726 with a successful play, Pyrrhus. In 1731, despite his long seclusion, he was elected to the Académie française; in 1735 he was appointed royal censor; and in 1745 Madame de Pompadour presented him with a pension of 1000 francs and a post in the royal library. In 1748 his Catilina was performed with great success at court; and in 1754, aged eighty, he presented his last tragedy, Le Triumvirat. His only son Claude was also an author.

Crébillon was considered by many to be superior to Voltaire as a tragic poet. The spirit of rivalry induced Voltaire to take the subjects of no less than five of Crébillon's tragedies (Semiramis, Electre, Catilina, Le Triumviral and Ahreeas) as his own. The so-called Éloge de Crébillon (1762; the title meant ironically), which appeared in the year of the poet's death, was generally attributed to Voltaire, though he strenuously denied the authorship.

There are numerous editions of his works, among which may be noticed: Œuvres (1772), with preface and éloge, by Joseph de La Porte; Œuvres (1828), containing D'Alembert's Éloge de Crébillon (1775); and Théâtre complet (1885), with a notice by Auguste Vito. A complete bibliography is given by Maurice Dutrait in his Étude sur la vie et le théâtre de Crébillon (1895).

Edgar Allan Poe took lines from Crébillon's Atrée as the last lines and obscure ending of his tale "The Purloined Letter".
