= Histoire de Dom Bougre, Portier des Chartreux =

1741 French novel

- Author: Jean-Charles Gervaise de Latouche
- Publication date: 1741

Histoire de Dom Bougre, Portier des Chartreux is a French novel from 1741. Allegedly the anonymous author was Jean-Charles Gervaise de Latouche. Histoire de Dom Bougre is one of the most celebrated French erotic novels of the 18th century, and one of the most frequently reprinted.

The novel was published under a variety of titles in French: Histoire de Dom B... (1741), Histoire de Gouberdom (1772), Mémoires de Saturnin (1787), Le Portier des chartreux (1784) and Histoire de Saturnin (1908). Translations into English have appeared under a similar variety of titles, such as The History of Don [sic] B. (1743), The Life and Adventures of Silas Shovewell (1801) and The History of Father Saturnin alias Don B*** alias Gouberdom – Porter of the Charterhouse at Paris (ca. 1827).

The name Bougre refers to the French term boulgre meaning bugger.

== Plot ==
The novel tells from the first-person perspective the life story of the monk B... (the acronym stands for Bougre, a French vulgar expression for pederast), whose real name is Saturnin. Saturnin's first sexual intercourse is with his sister Suzon and his mother. Even if it turns out later that in reality there is no blood relationship, the text heralds an incessant series of taboo breaking with this alleged incest. In the further course of numerous humorously designed scenes, Saturnin will experience all varieties of sexual disinhibition, whereby ruthless criticism of church and society is also practiced in constant alternation. Finally, Saturnin meets the syphilis sister in a brothel. He loves her sincerely and spends the night with her, although she warns him about the risk of infection. The two are torn apart the next day; Saturnin falls ill and is forcibly castrated to save his life, Suzon dies. In the end, Saturnin finds refuge in a Carthusian monastery, where, freed from all passions, he can await death, which he neither fears nor longs for. He would like the words: Hic situs est Dom Bougre, fututus, futuit (Here lies Dom Bougre, he fucked, and was fucked), to be inscribed on his grave.
