= The Indiscreet Jewels =

1748 novel by Denis Diderot

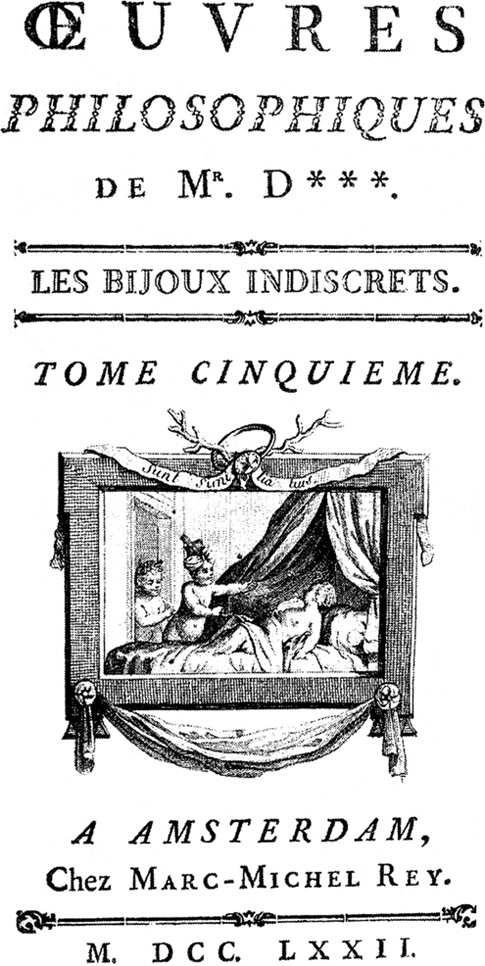
- Author: Denis Diderot
- Original title: Les Bijoux indiscrets
- Language: French
- Publication date: 1748
- Publication place: France

The Indiscreet Jewels (or The Indiscreet Toys, or The Talking Jewels; French: Les Bijoux indiscrets) is the first novel by Denis Diderot, published anonymously in 1748. It is an allegory that portrays Louis XV as Mangogul, Sultan of Congo, who owns a magic ring that makes women's vaginas ("jewels") talk. The character of Mirzoza represents Louis XV's mistress Madame de Pompadour. Diderot portrayed Pompadour in a flattering light in The Indiscreet Jewels, most likely to ensure her support for his Encyclopedie.

== Plot summary ==
Sultan Mangogul of Congo is bored with life at court and suspects his mistress Mirzoza of infidelity. A genie presents him with a magical ring that has unique properties. When the ring is rubbed and pointed at the vagina of any woman the vagina begins speaking about its amorous experiences, to the confusion and consternation of its owner. (Note: Bijou, which means "jewel", was used as slang for the vagina in 18th-century France.)

The Sultan uses the ring about thirty times, usually at a dinner or other social gathering, and on these occasions the Sultan is typically visible to the woman. However, since the ring has the additional property of making its owner invisible when required, a few of the sexual experiences are recounted through direct observation, as the Sultan makes himself invisible in the unsuspecting woman's boudoir.

== See also ==
- Vagina loquens

== English translations ==
- From Their Lips to His Ear. Pocket Erotica Series #6 (New Urge Editions/Black Scat Books, ISBN 978-1735615912, 2020)
