= Claude Prosper Jolyot de Crébillon =

French novelist (1707–1777)

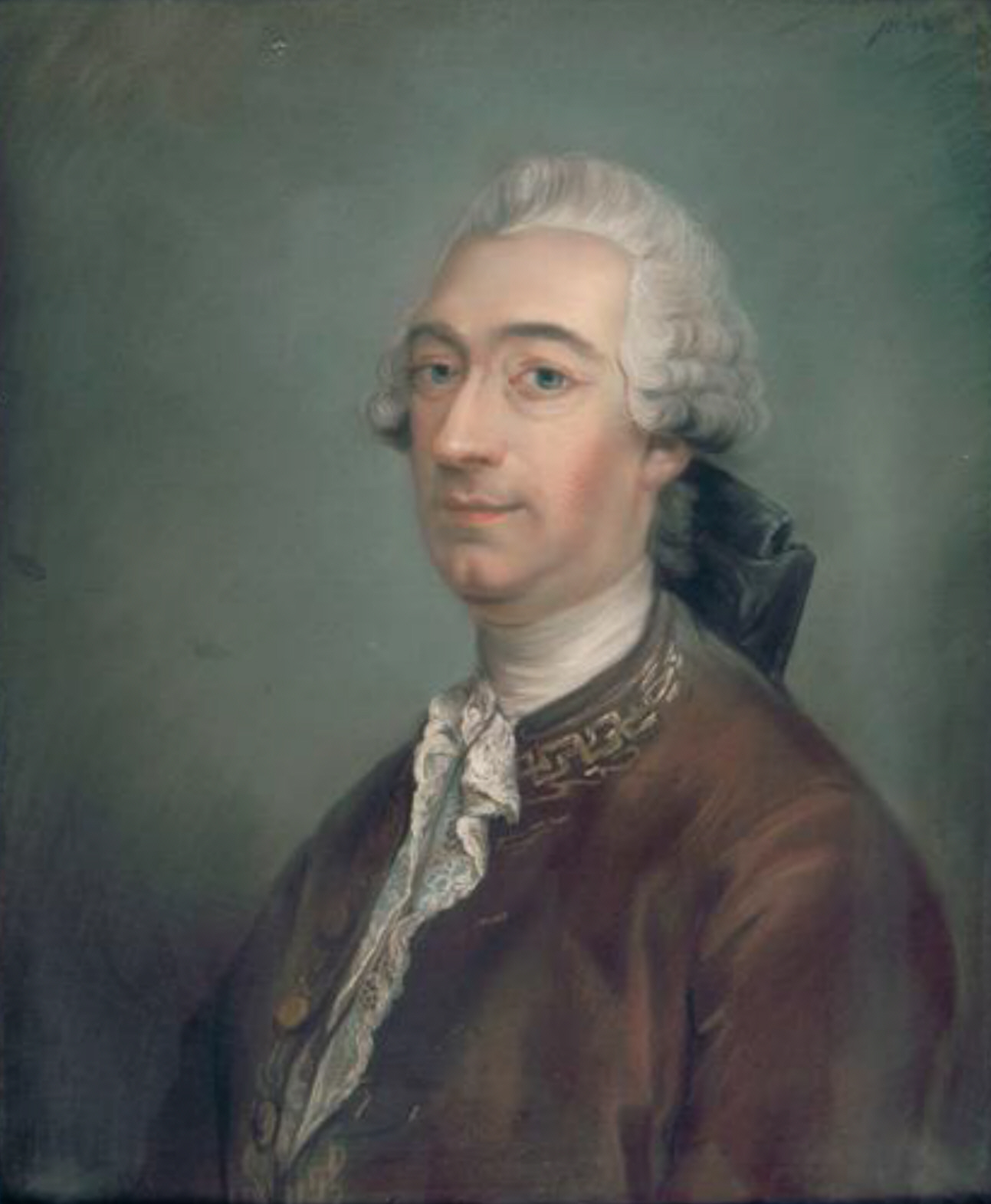
Claude Prosper Jolyot de Crébillon

Claude Prosper Jolyot de Crébillon (pronounced [klod pʁɔspɛʁ ʒɔljo də kʁebijɔ̃]; 13 February 1707 – 12 April 1777), called Crébillon fils or Crébillon le Gai (Crébillon the Gay) to distinguish him from his father, was a French novelist.

Born in Paris, he was the son of a famous tragedian, Prosper Jolyot de Crébillon (Crébillon père or Crébillon the Tragic). He received a Jesuit education at the elite Lycée Louis-le-Grand. Early on he composed various light works, including plays for the Italian Theatre in Paris, and published a short tale called Le Sylphe in 1730. From 1729 to 1739 he participated in a series of dinners called "Le Caveau" (named after the cabaret where they were held) with other artists, including Alexis Piron, Charles Collé, and Charles Duclos.

The publication of Tanzaï et Néadarné, histoire japonaise (1734), which contained thinly veiled attacks on the Papal bull Unigenitus, the cardinal de Rohan and others, landed him briefly in the prison at Vincennes. His novel Les Égarements du cœur et de l'esprit was published between 1736 and 1738 and was, although he continued to edit it in 1738, never finished. Publication of Le Sopha, conte moral, an erotic political satire, in 1742 forced him into exile from Paris for several months.

Around 1744 he entered into a romantic liaison with Lady Henrietta Maria Stafford, daughter of a Jacobite chamberlain, and they were married in 1748. A son was born in 1746 and died in 1750. Despite financial hardship, they lived together until her death in 1755. Meanwhile, he published La Nuit et le moment (1745), Ah! quel conte! and Les Heureux Orphelins (1754). Inheriting nothing from Henriette, he was forced to sell his large library in 1757 and eventually found steady income as a royal censor (like his father) in 1759. In 1768 and 1772 he published his last two novels, Lettres de la duchesse de *** au duc de *** and Lettres athéniennes.

== Works ==
- Le Sylphe ou Songe de Madame de R***. Écrit par elle-même à Madame de S*** (1730) (full text in French on Gallica) (The Sylph, in English translation by Sunny Lou Publishing: ISBN 978-1-95539-213-6, 2021)
- Lettres de la marquise de M*** au comte de R*** (1732)
- Tanzaï et Néadarné (incorrectly known as L'Écumoire, histoire japonaise) (1734) (full text in French on Gallica)
- Les Égarements du cœur et de l'esprit ou Mémoires de M. de Meilcour (1736–1738)
- Le Sopha, conte moral (1742) (full text in French on Gallica)
- Le dialogue des morts (1745)
- Les amours de Zéokinisul, roi des Kofirans (1746) (authorship disputed)
- Ah quel conte ! Conte politique et astronomique (1754) (full text in French on Gallica)
- Les Heureux Orphelins, histoire imitée de l'anglais (1754)
- La Nuit et le moment ou les matines de Cythère : dialogue (1755) (full text in French on Gallica)
- Le Hasard du coin du feu. Dialogue moral (1763) (full text in French on Gallica)
- Lettres de la Duchesse de *** au duc de *** (1768) (full text in French on Gallica)
- Lettres athéniennes. Extraites du porte-feuille d'Alcibiade (1771) (full text in French on Gallica)

== Recent editions ==
- Standard edition is Œuvres complètes, éd. Jean Sgard, 4 vols., Paris: Classiques Garnier, 1999-2002.
- Lettres de la marquise de M*** au comte de R***, Paris, Desjonquères, 1990.
- Les Égarements du cœur et de l'esprit, Paris: GF-Flammarion, 1985.
- Le Sopha, Paris, Desjonquères, 1984.
- La Nuit et le moment et Le Hasard du coin du feu, Paris, Desjonquères, 1983.
- La Nuit et le moment, Livre de Poche Classique, 2003.
- Les Heureux Orphelins, Paris, Desjonquères, 1995.
