= Louise Seidler =

German painter (1786–1866)

Louise Seidler (15 May 1786, Jena – 7 October 1866, Weimar) was a German painter at the court of the grand dukes of Weimar, custodian of their art collection and a trusted friend of the poet Goethe and the painter Georg Friedrich Kersting.

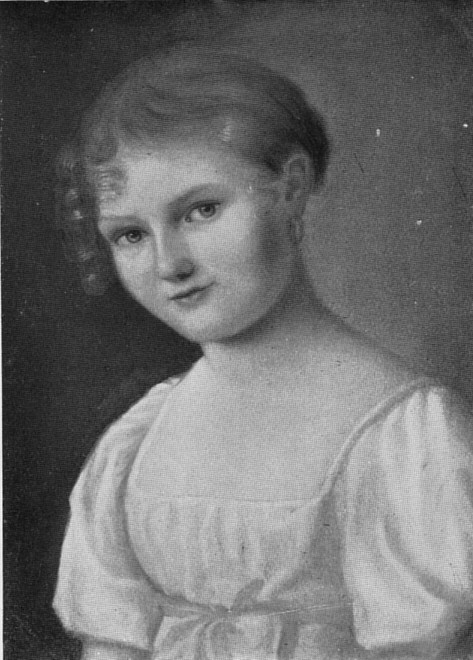
Self-portrait of Louise Seidler

== Life ==
=== Early life ===
Louise Seidler was born on 15 May 1786 was born to an academic in the university in Jena. She spent her youth with her grandmother (under whom she learned music and drawing) then on her grandmother's death was adopted by the wife of a doctor Stieler at Gotha. Her love of art was only developed under the sculptor Friedrich Wilhelm Eugen Döll, who had returned to Gotha after an eleven-year stay in Rome.

=== Return to Jena ===
Back in Jena she lived in her father's house, next door to Goethe's home in Jena's Schloss, getting to know him in her childhood. In Jena she also became friends with Silvie von Ziegesar and Pauline Gotter, later wife of the Jena professor Friedrich Wilhelm Schelling. Louise Seidler gained full admission to intellectual circles in the city, which then included Friedrich Schiller, Johann Gottlieb Fichte, Friedrich Wilhelm Schelling, Georg Wilhelm Friedrich Hegel, the brothers Alexander and Wilhelm von Humboldt, the brothers Friedrich and August Wilhelm Schlegel, Friedrich Tieck, Clemens Brentano, Therese Emilie Henriette Winkel, Voß, Paulus, Friedrich Immanuel Niethammer, Zacharias Werner and others. Goethe mainly met her in the house of the publisher Carl Friedrich Ernst Frommann, and began to become highly interested in her.

=== Marriage ===
On 14 October 1806 the French won the battle of Jena and in 1806 and 1807 occupied Jena, exposing its inhabitants to troop billeting and plunder. During this time Louise fell in love with and married the physician Geoffroy, in the corps of Marshal Jean-Baptiste Bernadotte. On orders received before his wedding he was then posted to Spain, where he soon afterwards died of fever in a military hospital. Her parents then sent the widowed Louise to Dresden to divert her from her mourning and scatter her gloomy thoughts.

=== Early painting career ===
Visiting the Dresdner Kunstgalerie, which had also impressed Goethe, she decided to become a painter and progressed fast, having become a pupil of the painter and teacher Christian Leberecht Vogel, who taught her for free. Goethe stayed in Dresden for 10 days on his trip back from Karlsbad, and was so pleased with Louise's copy of Carlo Dolce's "Saint Cecilia" that he invited her to Weimar, where she painted his portrait. Until her mother's death on 23 September 1814 she spent the winter months in Weimar and Jena and the summer months in Dresden, undergoing further training with the painter Gerhard von Kügelgen. In winter 1811 she was invited to Gotha by duke Augustus to paint him, his second wife Karoline Amalie and Princess Louise (his daughter by his first marriage). Further work there followed on later stays. Her mother's death on 23 September 1814 marked a break in her life, since she returned to her father in Jena as head of the household, though she still saw success in her artistic work.

=== Rochuskapelle in Bingen ===
In 1816 Louise completed an altarpiece of "Saint Roch", on designs by Heinrich Meyer for the Rochuskapelle in Bingen, that he had described in 1814 as "On the Rhine, Main and Neckar". This chapel had been rebuilt from ruins and was rededicated on 16 August 1814 (St Roch's feast day), with Goethe participating in the ceremonies. The altarpiece began a correspondence between him and Louise, in which he expressed his happiness in the work.

=== Munich (1817-18) ===
Thanks to Goethe she received a one-year scholarship of 400 Taler from duke Charles Augustus to go to Munich for a year's further training in painting. On 4 July 1817 she travelled to Munich and, with letters of recommendation from Goethe, was welcomed into the house of the philosopher Friedrich Heinrich Jacobi. In Munich she again met her friend Pauline Gotter, who in 1812 had married the philosopher Friedrich Wilhelm Schelling, and in her house met the Swedish poet Per Daniel Amadeus Atterbom. Previously under the influence of the academy director Langer, Louise's painting style now became more independent as she moved from copying others' artworks to studying nature (which she had previously neglected). Even so, she still copied Raphael's "Portrait of Bindo Altoviti" in Munich for the Duke and produced a drawing of the friezes of Leo von Klenze's Apollotempel at the Nymphenburg Palace for Goethe. The duke then granted her request for a further scholarship in Italy, again of 400 Taler.

=== Italy (1818-23) ===
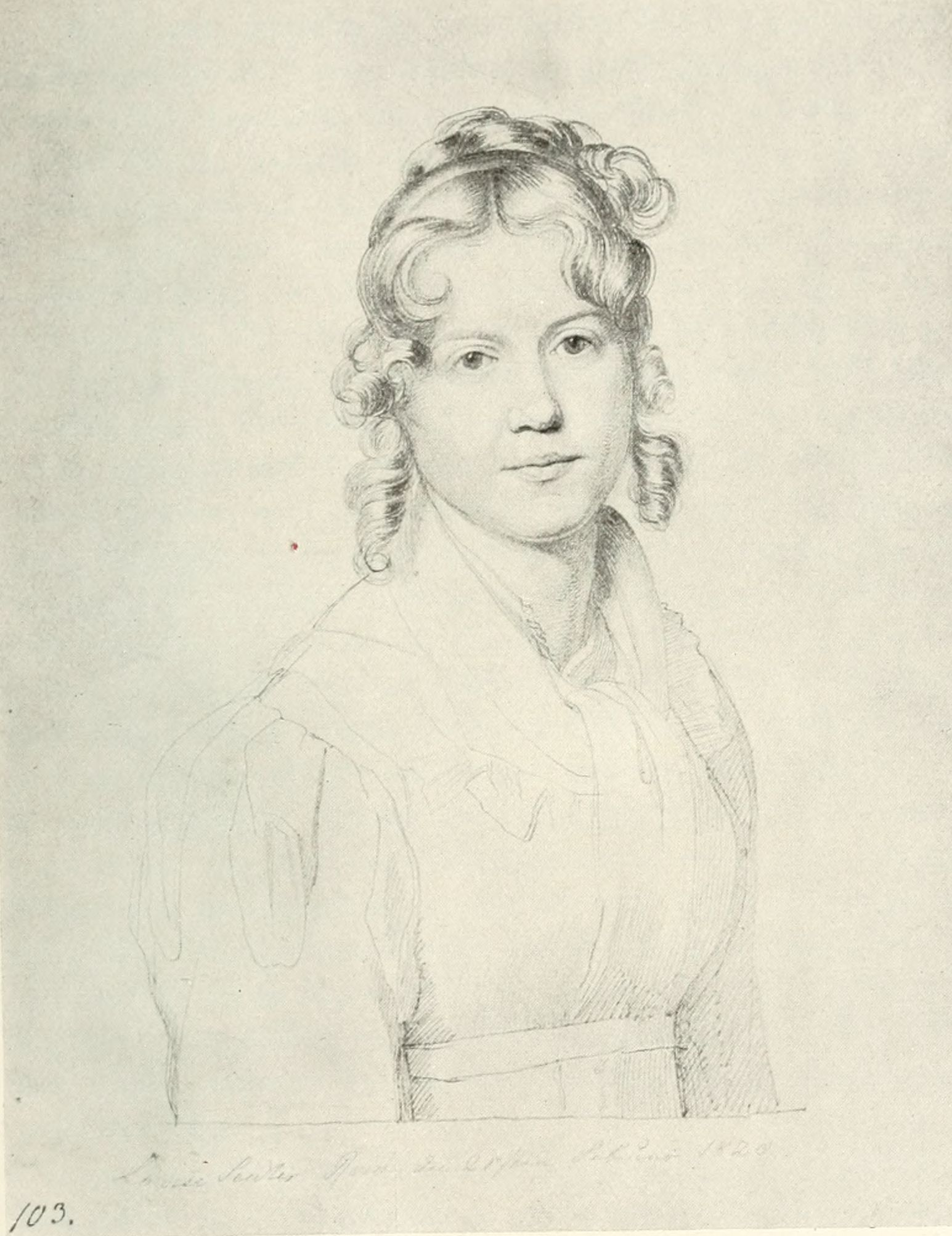
Seidler in Rome 1820; by Carl Christian Vogel von Vogelstein

On 20 September 1818 Louise set out on her trip to Italy, arriving in Rome the following 30 October. She lived in the artistic circle of the city (usually based on the Pincian Hill), also frequented by Julius Schnorr von Carolsfeld and the brothers Johann and Philipp Veit. In the German colony of painters and sculptors she found a way in to the artistic and social life of the city and its expatriates. She was welcomed into the houses of Barthold Georg Niebuhr (Prussian envoy to the Vatican) and of the wife of Wilhelm von Humboldt.

In spring 1819 she spent many months in Naples and in autumn 1820 in Florence, in order to copy Raphael's "Madonna del Granduca" and "Madonna del cardellino" (both in the Uffizi) for grand-duke Charles Augustus. The painter Friedrich Preller was so impressed by her copies that he called them "the best known copies I know". A further copy, of "The Tempi Madonna", was bought by king Louis I of Bavaria in 1826 for the Pinakothek in Munich. In late autumn 1821 she left Florence for Rome.

In April and May 1822 she copied "The Violin Players", with the copy later a part of the collection at the Schloss Sanssouci in Potsdam. At the same time she began her own painting "Saint Elizabeth handing out alms". In reports Louise called her time in Italy the happiest of her life, but this period came to a sudden end when in 1823 she received news that her father had fallen seriously ill and she had to return to Germany.

=== Return to Weimar ===
Only on her return to Weimar did she find time to complete her work "Saint Elizabeth handing out alms". On the recommendation of Goethe and Johann Heinrich Meyer duke Charles Augustus put her in charge of the education of his daughter Maria and Augusta. On her father's death she was able to return to Italy, but was prevented from doing so when in 1824 Charles Augustus made her custodian of the grand-ducal art collection in Weimar's Grossen Jägerhaus. Except for a few journeys Louise remained in Weimar and was highly appreciated in society circles. She led a lively correspondence with personalities such as Philipp Veit and his wife Karoline and wife Dorothea Schlegel, among others. It was mainly due to her that Herr von Quandt created the Saxonian Art Association and that Goethe gave that association his active support. Right up to his death in 1832 Goethe was grateful to Louise for her promotion of his career (and vice versa) and his death put her into deep mourning.

With Mrs von Bardeleben, in autumn 1832, she went on a second trip to Italy, lasting just over a year. Above all she maintained her relations with the painter Friedrich Preller, who inspired her to paint religious and devotional paintings, which diverted her from artistic work after her return from Italy, with her increasing blindness towards the end of her life also preventing the completion of many works.

== Literary work ==
Before her death she wrote her autobiography "Erinnerungen aus dem Leben der Malerin Louise Seidler" (Memories from the Life of the Painter Louise Seidler), published by Hermann Uhde in 1873 and which is still one of the most important art historical sources for the time.

== Works ==
=== Copies ===
- Saint Cecilia by Carlo Dolce
- Portrait of Bindo Altoviti, 1818
- The Madonna del Gran Duca, 1820
- The Madonna with the Goldfinch, 1820
- The Madonna Tempi, 1821
- The Violin Players, 1822

=== Portraits ===
- Duke Augustus and family, 1811
- Goethe, 1811
- Wilhelmine Herzlieb
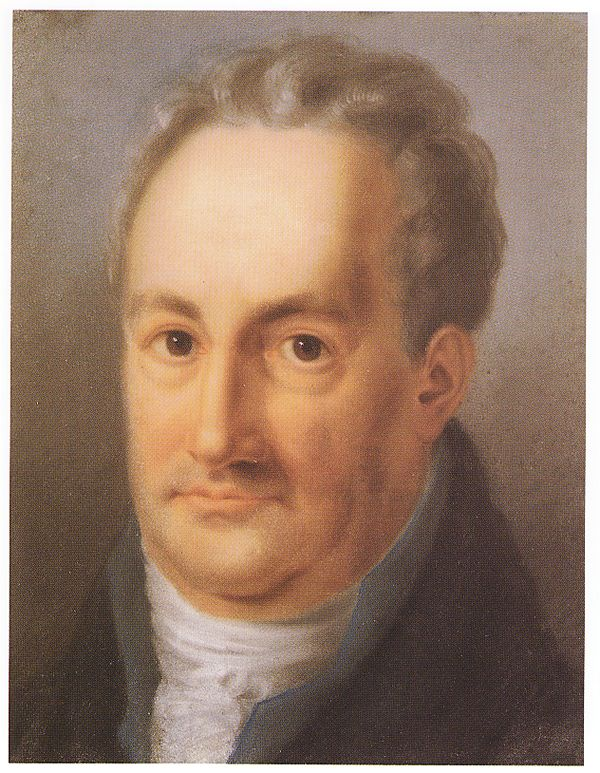
Johann Wolfgang von Goethe (1811)

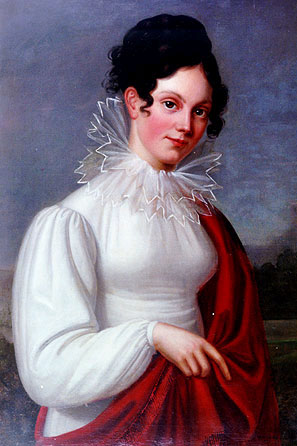
Wilhelmine Herzlieb

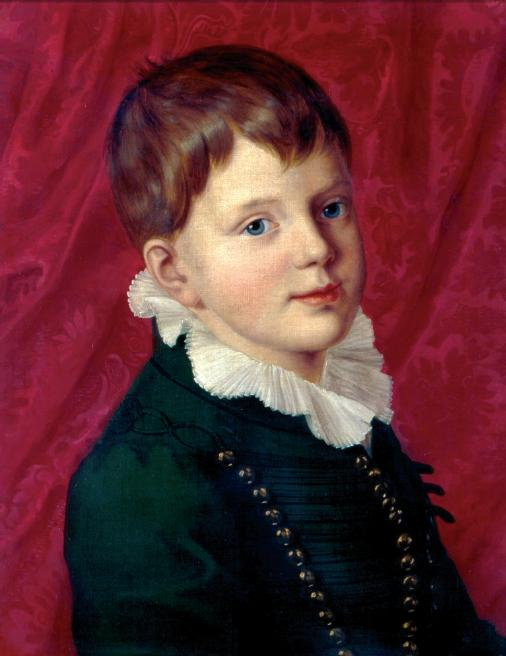
Charles Alexander, Grand Duke of Saxe-Weimar-Eisenach

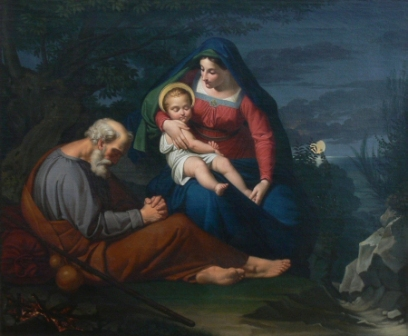
Resting During the
Flight into Egypt

=== Other works ===
- Altarpiece of the Heiligen Rochus, 1816
- Pastel drawing of Sylvie von Ziegesar
- Drawing of the friezes at the Apollotempel, 1818
- Saint Elisabeth handing out alms, 1823
