= Pauline Gotter =

- Born: 29 December 1786; Gotha
- Died: 31 December 1851 (aged 65); Gotha
- Spouse: Friedrich Wilhelm Joseph Schelling
- Parent(s): Friedrich Wilhelm Gotter and Louise Gotter

Pauline Gotter (29 December 1786 – 31 December 1854) was the second wife of Friedrich Wilhelm Joseph Schelling and a friend of Louise Seidler and Sylvie von Ziegesar.

== Life ==
Angelica Pauline Amalie Gotter was born on 29 December 1786. Her parents were the playwright, Privy Councilor ("Geheimrat") and archivist Friedrich Wilhelm Gotter and Louise Gotter (née Stiege). Her mother was a close friend of Caroline Schlegel (née Michaelis), while her father had been close friends with Johann Wolfgang von Goethe since his youth.

Pauline Gotter had two sisters and knew Goethe and Caroline Schlegel from childhood on. In her youth she was friends with Sylvie von Ziegesar and the painter Louise Seidler. Together with her friends, she had access to Jena's most elevated intellectual circles, which at that time comprised such creative minds as Friedrich Schiller, Johann Gottlieb Fichte, Friedrich Wilhelm Joseph Schelling, Georg Wilhelm Friedrich Hegel, brothers Alexander and Wilhelm von Humboldt, brothers Friedrich and August Wilhelm Schlegel, Friedrich Tieck, Clemens Brentano, Voß, Paulus, Niethammer, Zacharias Werner and others.

Pauline Gotter loved her mother's friends. Caroline Schlegel was an intelligent woman who had sided with the French Revolution, and as a result was nearly arrested for treason. Her daughter, who was almost the same age as Pauline Gotter, was the first love of the philosopher Friedrich Wilhelm Schelling, a rising star in Jena's intellectual world, and a passionate follower of Johann Gottlieb Fichte. When she fell sick with dysentery in 1800, he tried desperately to find some means by which to stave off her death. Pauline Gotter and her family were forced to stand by as accusations were made of Schelling and rumors were spread. "Schelling," said Dorothea Veit, "had a hand in it." Jena's literary magazine, the Jenaische Allgemeine Literaturzeitung, reported, "He cares for her 'flawlessly' and kills her 'honestly.'" Rumors, accusations, and gossip didn't die down, and August Wilhelm Schlegel and his wife Caroline divorced in 1803 at Goethe's behest. Friedrich Wilhelm Schelling married her two months later. They left Jena together in 1804 and moved to Würzburg, where Schelling received a teaching position at the university, and Caroline Schelling stood faithfully by her new husband's side.

In 1806 Pauline Gotter stayed with her friend Sylvie von Ziegesar in Karlsbad, where Goethe courted Ziegesar and dedicated some of his poems to her. Her friend Louise Seidler also enjoyed the favor of the German prince of poets, who instructed her to paint a portrait of him.

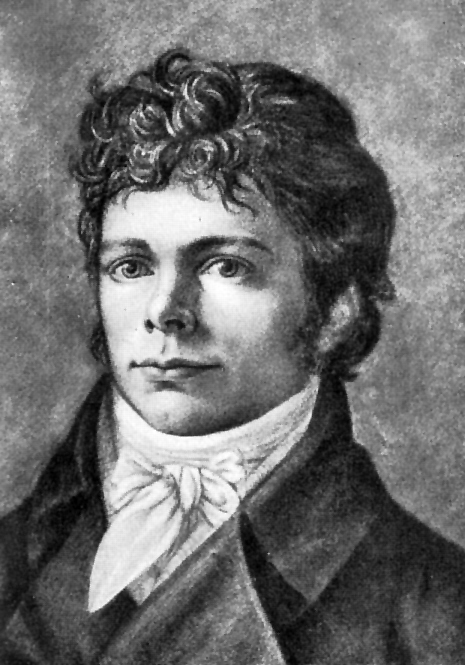
Friedrich Wilhelm Joseph Schelling

On 7 September 1809, Caroline Schelling (formerly Schlegel) died suddenly. Pauline Gotter and her family were very distraught at her death. They wrote letters and paid visits to Schelling in an effort to console him, but he became progressively more withdrawn and expressed growing criticism of science and of the church. This increasingly intimate correspondence lead to his engagement with Pauline Gotter.

On 11 June 1812, Pauline Gotter married Friedrich Wilhelm Schelling, who was eleven years her senior, and who was elevated to the nobility and invited to join to the Academy of Science in Munich in the same year. On 17 December 1813 their first child was born. Five more followed. One of their daughters was named Caroline, in honor of Friedrich's first wife. Pauline Schelling took charge of running the house and raising the children. Her letters possessed a natural, spirited grace, though they lacked the intellectual significance of his first wife's writings. She was in this respect no substitute for Caroline in Friedrich's eyes, and he grew unpersonable and withdrew rapidly into incoherent writings on mythology and irritated responses to Hegel as he ascended to scholarly fame.

Pauline Schelling died on 31 December 1854, four months after her husband.
