= Opus Maximum =

The Opus Maximum was a set of philosophical manuscripts dictated by Samuel Taylor Coleridge to his friend and colleague, Dr Joseph Henry Green, between 1819 and 1823. It was not published in Coleridge's lifetime, finally emerging in the 2002 version edited by Thomas McFarland with the assistance of Nicholas Halmi.

It is not entirely clear what form the book would have taken if Coleridge had published it. He died before he could assemble the various manuscripts and other notes into a publishable form, and the published volume contains four 'fragments' along with two appendixes and evidence of missing chapters. It should be read in conjunction with the separately published Logic, since that volume completes the transcendental deduction which lies at the heart of the enterprise.

It was also intended to form part of a larger Magnum Opus or Logosophia, of which parts exist in various manuscripts. Mary Anne Perkins has set out the dimensions of that larger project in her Coleridge's Philosophy.

== Publication history ==
Coleridge had intended his disciple, Green, to publish the Opus Maximum after Coleridge's death but Green failed to do this, instead publishing his own work, Spiritual Philosophy; Founded on the Teaching of the Late Samuel Taylor Coleridge. Green's work began by claiming that the distinction between the Reason and the Understanding was merely one of degree—a claim which showed that Green had not understood Coleridge's most fundamental distinction. Green's failure to publish the Opus Maximum caused some controversy in the 1850s. Green argued that the manuscripts were incomplete and 'scarcely adapted for scientific readers, ... or the requirements of modern science', though Green's decision also prevented Coleridge's followers, immediate and future, from understanding his philosophical system—and the advances Coleridge had made following the failure of the Biographia Literaria to provide a systematic argument.

The volume's eventual publication was also protracted, something explained in part by Thomas McFarland's claim to have taken longer not editing the book than Coleridge had spent not writing it.

The long delay in the publication led to the myth that Coleridge's philosophical system was a will-o-the-wisp, yet another of Coleridge's projects announced but never put to paper.

== The argument ==
As might be expected of a work by Coleridge, the Opus Maximum contains a miscellany of contents. As he wrote in a letter in 1818, 'my Thought are like Surinam toads—as they crawl on, little Toads vegetate out from back & side, grow quickly, & draw off the attention from the mother Toad'. Evans argues that the volume's apparently unsystematic form reflects Coleridge's belief that arguments for God cannot be demonstrated using the resources of the Understanding, but must draw their substance from within their readers through the power of the Reason, and that the work is designed rhetorically to achieve this.

The argument is broadly neo-platonic. As Carlyle commented sardonically, Coleridge had discovered 'the sublime secret of believing by "the reason" what the "understanding" has been obliged to fling out'. Coleridge argued that the Kantian strictures on metaphysical argument only applied within the realm of the Understanding and did not restrict neo-platonic argument founded in the Reason. His argument can be rendered schematically:

1. Coleridge argues that 'will must be conceived as anterior to all' (OM 194) since will is the only entity capable of instantiating itself and thus providing the ground of the universe.
2. The will can only instantiate itself in the form of a person (OM 166, 172, 195).
3. Personhood is a communal concept: there can be no I without a Thou (OM 194-196).
4. Since will, when actual, is unified, the I and the Thou must in some sense be the same. Fully actual Selfhood or Personhood can thus only arise within the Trinity, where the Father comes into self-consciousness in His recognition of the Son (OM 194-199).
5. There is no sense in which the Trinity is riven, like Schelling's 'Absolute' or unconscious God. The Son, within the Trinity, is not Schelling's self-as-object; and Coleridge's system does not share the unstable foundations of Schelling's System of Transcendental Idealism where the two primary and opposing forces can only come into being in a final synthesis—which is impossible and therefore infinitely deferred.
6. However, the human will, which is fallen, is internally riven and thus can be derived from Schelling's deduction.
7. The human will has its origin in the fall of the Satanic or Apostatic will (OM 326). The Apostatic will wills itself as something separate from God. However, will can only be actual if it is realised in the Trinity, so the Apostatic will becomes mere potential, lacking in all actuality.
8. God offers redemption to the fallen will, in the form of a gift of actuality (OM 316-320). That part of the Apostatic will which accepts this gift comes into being. This is the origin of nature and of human selves.
9. Human selves thus arise out of an original polarity of potential and actual (OM 227). These are the two forces that Schelling spoke of as lying at the heart of selfhood, but Coleridge gives them a firmer foundation and one which does not contaminate the Godhead with division or infinite failure (OM 317, 322, 326).
10. Having set Schelling's argument on sounder foundations, Coleridge is free to use Schelling's argument (the transcendental deduction which was missing in the Biographia) to explain the origins of nature and of human selves. See System of Transcendental Idealism for more information.

The existing Opus Maximum does not contain the details of Schelling's deduction, with Schelling's three epoch's and Schelling's deduction of the categories of the Kantian Understanding. But Schelling's third epoch, in which both finite selves and nature come into existence in an infinite series of moments of perception (this is an idealist argument) does appear in Coleridge's Logic. In that sense, the argument is complete, though some of the details are missing.

== The significance of the argument ==
The argument above supplies the transcendental deduction that was missing from the Biographia, with the deduction of the primary imagination appearing in the Logic. Perkins and Reid argue that the Opus Maximum could not have been written until Coleridge made the conceptual breakthrough contained in a note presumably intended for Green in September 1818:

It is ever awful to me to reflect on the morning of our first systematic Conversation, when we opened Schelling's Introduction to his Naturphilosophie and looking thro' the first 20 pages obtained a clear conviction, that he had imprisoned his System within a Circle that could never open ....

The argument in the Opus Maximum still formed the basis of Coleridge's thinking until his death in 1834. In April 1830, he said of the distinction between the actual and the potential:

This, this Principle must be studied and studied, till it is completely mastered—… before the other parts of the System can be received with a clear light.

His failure to publish thus did not arise from a change of mind, though there is evidence that he continued to refine the argument in the late 1820s, so as to account for the survival of the soul after the death of the body.
