= Weltalter =

The Weltalter (sometimes Die Weltalter; "[The] Ages of the World") of Friedrich Schelling refers to a philosophical work of 1811, and its continuation in manuscript for many years after that. It was a long and unfinished project, sometimes identified with Schelling's philosophical output from 1809 to 1827, the period beginning with his Freiheitsschrift.

== The Weltalter fragments ==
Despite Schelling's years of work on the project, no definitive version of the Weltalter emerged. There were three drafts in a series: the later versions were not complete and are often referred to as fragments. A work System der Weltalter from 1827/8 consists of Munich lecture notes taken by Ernst von Lasaulx from Schelling, who was at that time a student also of Franz von Baader and Joseph Görres.

The manuscripts, which no longer exist, are assigned to the periods 1811, 1813 and 1814/5. The 1814/5 manuscript was published posthumously; copies of the other two manuscripts, made by Manfred Schröter before the destruction of the originals by bombing in World War II, were published in 1946, with some of Schelling's project notes.

== Influences ==
Schelling works in the Weltalter with and from a theological idea of creation. He is influenced by the formulations of Jakob Boehme, and in general the Bible. Taken as a Romantic theory of the anima mundi, the Weltalter writings call on, at least superficially, mysticism (both Jewish and Christian) and natural philosophy.

== Philosophical formulation ==
Aside from the language used, there are a number of formulations explaining the problems Schelling was tackling in the Weltalter project. According to a 2010 paper,

When Schelling sat down to write the Ages of the World he had a large number of seemingly contradictory philosophical commitments to reconcile. He wanted to avoid dualism and yet acknowledge the essential and irreducible roles of both spirit and matter. He wanted to give a law-like description of the creation of the world and yet preserve divine freedom. He wanted to treat God as perfect and self-sufficient and yet also account for the motive underlying God's decision to create the world. Perhaps most paradoxically of all, he wanted to explain what events led up to the creation of the past – what ‘caused’ time.

The 1813 draft has been called the origin of dialectical materialism. Slavoj Žižek in explaining his attitude to the Weltalter and its theosophical leanings, however, states that "there is no way of throwing out the dirty bath water without losing the baby".
