= Peter von Ziegesar =

American writer

- Born: Franz Peter von Ziegesar; October 1, 1952 (age 74)
- Occupations: Writer, filmmaker
- Spouse: Hali Lee
- Children: 3
- Website: petervonziegesar.com

Franz Peter von Ziegesar (born October 1, 1952) is an American writer and filmmaker. In 2013 he authored the memoir The Looking Glass Brother.

== Early life and family ==
Von Ziegesar is the son of Franz Albrecht von Ziegesar, who was the CEO and Chairman of Bowne & Co. and a member of the Von Ziegesar family, and his first wife, Anne Cheney. His parents later divorced and remarried. A member of an old German noble family, he grew up in New Canaan, Connecticut and summered at his maternal family's Long Island estate, Peacock Point. He is the half-brother of author Cecily von Ziegesar.

== Career ==
In 2002 von Ziegesar directed the documentary film Prom Night in Kansas City.

In 2013 von Ziegesar, who works as a freelance film writer, authored the memoir The Looking Glass Brother: The Preposterous, Moving, Hilarious, and Frequently Terrifying Story of My Gilded Age Long Island Family, My Philandering Father, and the Homeless Stepbrother Who Shares My Name. The book details the life of von Ziegesar's stepbrother, also named Peter, who suffers from mental illness and, despite growing up in an affluent family, became homeless. He subsequently became his stepbrother's caretaker. Von Ziegesar has also worked as an art critic.

Von Ziegesar has also written for DoubleTake, The New York Times, The New York Times Magazine, Outside, and Art in America. He was awarded a PEN Syndicated Fiction Prize for his short fiction works. His multimedia and film projects were exhibited at the Hirshhorn Museum and Sculpture Garden in Washington, D.C.

== Personal life ==
Von Ziegesar lives in Brooklyn with his wife, Hali Lee, and three children.
