= Christoph Gottfried Bardili =

German philosopher (1761–1808)

Christoph Gottfried Bardili (18 May 1761 – 5 June 1808) was a German philosopher and cousin of Friedrich Wilhelm Joseph Schelling. He was critical of Kantian idealism and proposed his own system of philosophy known as rational realism, a view based purely upon "thinking as thinking".

== Life ==
Bardili was born on 18 May 1761 in Blaubeuren in the Duchy of Württemberg. In 1786 he became a Repentant at the Stift, a Protestant theological college in Tübingen. In 1790 he became a professor of philosophy at the Karlsschule in Stuttgart. After the closing of the Karlschule in 1794, he became a professor of philosophy at the Stuttgart Gymnasium Illustre where he taught until his death on 5 June 1808.

In his Grundriss der ersten Logik (1800), Bardili dissented strongly from the Kantian distinction between matter and form of thought, and urged that philosophy should mainly consider thought in itself, pure thought, the ground or possibility of being.

The fundamental principle of thought is, according to him, the law of identity; logical thinking is real thinking. The matter upon which thought operated is in itself indefinite and is rendered definite through the action of thought. Bardili worked out his idea in a one-sided manner. He held that thought has in itself no power of development, and ultimately reduced it to arithmetical computation.

According to the Encyclopædia Britannica Eleventh Edition:

His system has had little influence in Germany; Karl Leonhard Reinhold (1757–1823) alone expounded it against the attack of Fichte and Schelling. Yet in some respects his ideas opened the way for the later speculations of Schelling and Hegel.

Bardili died in Mergelstetten in the Kingdom of Württemberg.

== Works ==
- Observationes physicae, praesertim meteorologicae (1780).
- Ueber die Entstehung und Beschaffenheit des ausserordentlichen Nebels in unseren Gegenden im Sommer 1783 (1783).
- Epochen der vorzüglichsten philosophischen Begriffe (1788). 2 volumes.
  - Volume 1. Epochen der Ideen von einem Geist, von Gott und der menschlichen Seele.
- Giebt es für die wichtigsten Lehren der theoretischen sowohl als der praktischen Philosophie (1791).
- Sophylus oder Sittlichkeit und Natur als Fundamente der Weltweisheit (1794).
- Allgemeine praktische Philosophie (1795).
- Ueber den Ursprung des Begriffs von der Willensfreiheit (1796).
- Ueber die [Gesetze] der Ideenassoziation (1796).
- Briefe über den Ursprung der Metaphysik überhaupt (1798). Kiel
- Grundriss der ersten Logik (1800).
- Philosophische Elementarlehre (1802–1806). 2 volumes.
- Beiträge zur Beurtheilung des gegenwärtigen Zustandes der Vernunftlehre (1803).
- Briefwechsel über das Wesen der Philosophie und das Unwesen der Speculation (1804). Google
