= Cecily von Ziegesar =

American author (born 1970)

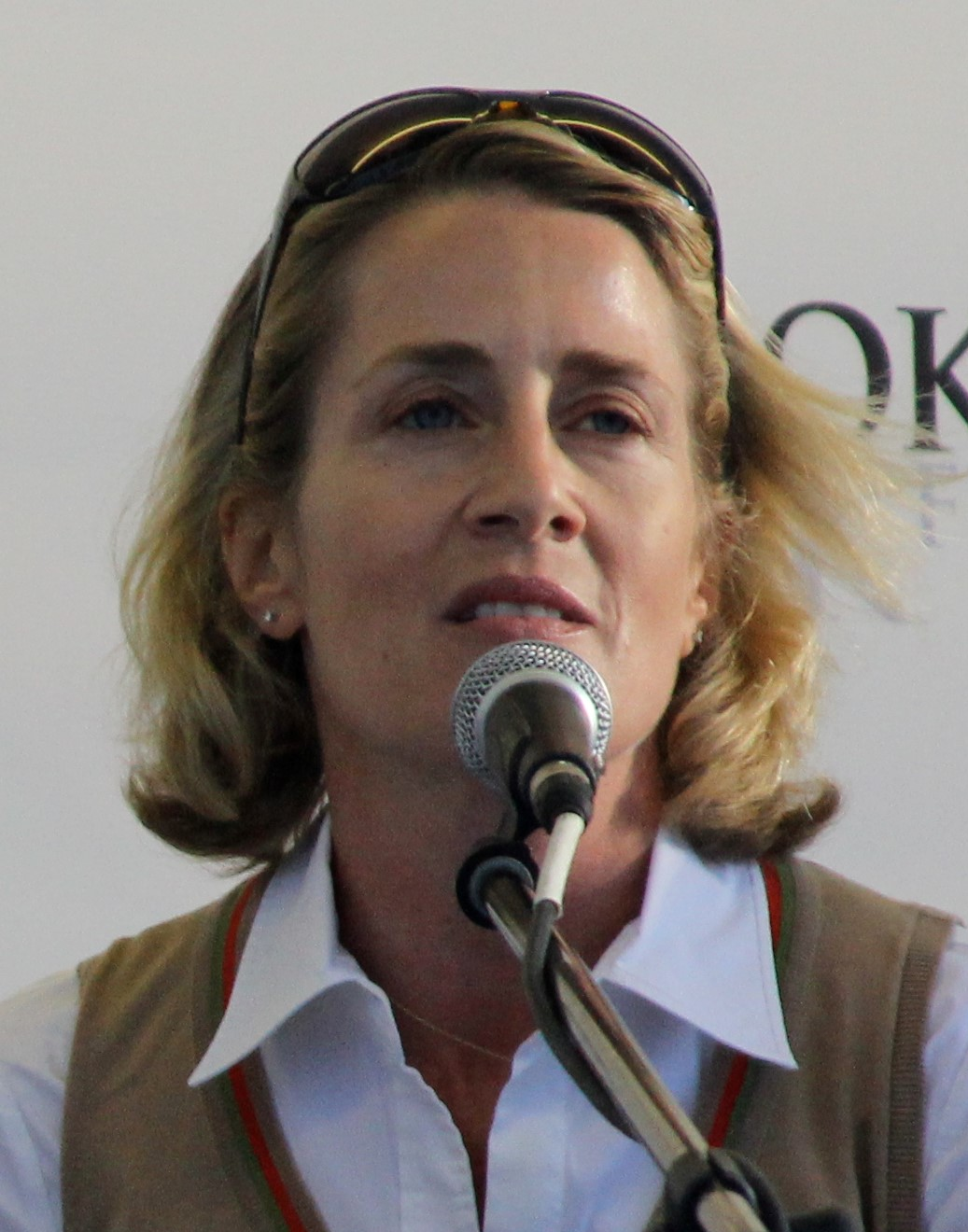
- Ziegesar at the 2012 Brooklyn Book Festival
- Born: Cecily Brooke von Ziegesar; June 27, 1970 (age 56); New York City, New York, U.S.
- Education: Nightingale-Bamford School; Colby College (BA); University of Arizona (dropped out)
- Occupation: Novelist
- Spouse: Richard Griggs
- Children: 2
- Writing career
- Period: 2002–present
- Genres: Drama, comedy, short, romance
- Notable works: Gossip Girl series The It Girl series

Cecily Brooke von Ziegesar (/ˌvɒn zɪˈɡeɪzər/ VON zig-AY-zər; born June 27, 1970) is an American author best known for the young adult novel series Gossip Girl.

== Early life and education ==
Cecily von Ziegesar was born in New York City into the Ziegesar family, which belonged to an ancient German nobility from the Margraviate of Brandenburg. She is the daughter of Franz Albrecht von Ziegesar, the CEO and Chairman of Bowne & Co., and his second wife, Olivia James. She is the half-sister of writer Peter von Ziegesar. Her childhood dream was to grow up to be a ballerina; she began lessons at age three and auditioned for the School of American Ballet at age eight, but was rejected. As a teenager, she commuted from Connecticut to Manhattan at 6:00 a.m. every day to attend The Nightingale-Bamford School. After graduating from Nightingale, von Ziegesar attended Colby College. Then she spent a year in Budapest working for a local radio station. She then returned to the United States to study creative writing at the University of Arizona, leaving school shortly thereafter.

== Career ==
=== Gossip Girl ===
==== Book series ====
In New York City, while working at book-packaging firm Alloy Entertainment, she became inspired to create the Gossip Girl series, which presents a view of high-end teenage lifestyles. The series climbed to the top of The New York Times Best-Sellers list in 2002. A spin-off book series, The It Girl, made the list in 2005.

The Constance Billard [sic] School for Girls is based on an exaggerated version of Ziegesar's own alma mater, Nightingale.

In October 2011, Ziegesar released a spin-off of her first novel: Psycho Killer.

In February 2026, it was announced that a standalone novel titled Blair would be published in the summer of 2027. The novel will pick up 20 years after the original series.

==== Television series ====
Gossip Girl was adapted for television by The CW in 2007. Though fans of the book series criticized it for veering away from the book in plot and character personalities, Ziegesar stated that the major plot outline remained true to her vision, and that she was pleased that "at least it takes place in New York City". On May 16, 2011, Ziegesar herself made a cameo appearance in the fourth season finale.

==== Graphic novel series ====
In December 2009, Yen Press announced that it was working with South Korean artist Baek Hye-Kyung to create a graphic novel adaptation of the series titled Gossip Girl: For Your Eyes Only. Rather than adapting the original novels, however, the graphic novels features original stories with the same characters. It would be serialized in the company's anthology magazine Yen Plus, with the first chapter appearing in the January 2010 issue.

== Personal life ==
Von Ziegesar resides in the Columbia Street Waterfront District, a neighborhood in Brooklyn, with her husband Richard Griggs, who is Chief Operating Officer of the Judd Foundation, and their children Agnes Belle von Ziegesar Griggs and Oscar von Ziegesar Griggs.

== Books ==
=== Gossip Girl ===
1. Gossip Girl (2002)
2. You Know You Love Me (2002)
3. All I Want Is Everything (2003)
4. Because I'm Worth It (2003)
5. I Like It Like That (2004)
6. You're the One That I Want (2004)
7. Nobody Does It Better (2005)
8. Nothing Can Keep Us Together (2005)
9. Only in Your Dreams (2006) (written by ghost-writer)
10. Would I Lie To You? (2006) (written by ghost-writer)
11. Don't You Forget About Me (2007) (written by ghost-writer)
12. I Will Always Love You (2009) (written by ghost-writer)
13. It Had To Be You (2007) (prequel)
14. Psycho Killer (October 2011) (spin-off)

=== The It Girl ===
This series was written by a ghost-writer, with guidance from Cecily von Ziegesar.

1. The It Girl (2005)
2. Notorious (2006)
3. Reckless (2006)
4. Unforgettable (2007)
5. Lucky (2007)
6. Tempted (2008)
7. Infamous (2008)
8. Adored (2009)
9. Devious (2009)
10. Classic (2010)
11. Dreaming (2010)

=== Gossip Girl: The Carlyles ===
This series is ghost-written by Annabelle Vestry.

1. Gossip Girl: The Carlyles (2008)
2. You Just Can't Get Enough (2008)
3. Take A Chance on Me (2009)
4. Love the One You're With (2009)

=== Cum Laude ===
1. Cum Laude (June 1, 2010 from Hyperion) republished under the name Class in 2011.

=== Cobble Hill ===
1. Cobble Hill (2020)
