= Gottlob Christian Storr =

German theologian

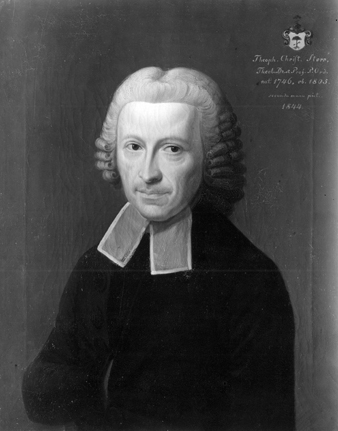
Gottlob Christian Storr

Gottlob Christian Storr (10 September 1746 – 17 January 1805) was a German Lutheran theologian, born in Stuttgart. He was the son of theologian Johann Christian Storr (1712–1773) and the older brother of naturalist Gottlieb Conrad Christian Storr (1749–1821).

== Biography ==
Storr studied philosophy and theology at the University of Tübingen, where his instructors were Jeremias Friedrich Reuß and Johann Friedrich Cotta. Following completion of his theological examination in 1768, he undertook an educational journey with his brother through Germany, Holland, England and France. In 1775 he became a vicar in Stuttgart, and two years later returned to the University Tübingen as an associate professor of philosophy and theology. In 1786, he attained a full professorship at Tübingen, and in 1797 returned to Stuttgart as an Oberhofprediger.

He was an outspoken advocate of Biblical Supranaturalism, and founder of "Ältere Tübinger Schule" (conservative Tübingen school of theologians). His conservative orthodox views in theology placed him at odds with proponents of the Enlightenment, rationalism and Kantian philosophy.

Two of Storr's better known followers were Friedrich Gottlieb Süskind and Johann Friedrich Flatt. Two other famous students of Storr were G. W. F. Hegel and F. W. J. Schelling.

He was the first to propose that the New Testament book of Mark was written prior to the other Gospels (Markan priority), an assertion that opposed the traditional view that the book of Matthew was the earliest Gospel written.

He died in Stuttgart.

== Selected publications ==
- "Observationes super Novi Testamenti versionibus syriacis", 1772.
- "Dissertatio de evangeliis arabicis", 1775.
- Neue Apologie der Offenbarung Johannis, 1783.
- Storr, Gottlob Christian (1786). Über den Zweck der evangelischen Geschichte und der Briefe Johannis (in German). Tübingen: Jacob Friedrich Heerbrandt.
- Über den Zweck der evangelischen Geschichte und der Briefe Johannis, 1786, second edition 1810.
- "Doctrinae christianae pars theoretica", 1793 (translated into German by Johann Friedrich Flatt in 1813).
- "Opuscula academica ad interpretationem librorum sacrorum pertinentia" (1796–97), 2 volumes.
