= Friedrich Gottlieb Süskind =

Friedrich Gottlieb Süskind (February 17, 1767 – November 12, 1829) was a German Protestant theologian and pastor, born in Neuenstadt am Kocher.

== Life ==
In 1783, he began his theological studies at the Protestant seminary in Tübingen (Tübinger Stift, later embarking on an extensive journey throughout Germany (1790). Afterwards, he served as "pastor repentant" at Tübinger Stift, followed by a vicariate in Stuttgart (1795). Between 1795 and 1798, he served as a Diakonus (deacon) in Urach. In 1798, he became an associate professor at the University of Tübingen, and in 1805 returned to Stuttgart, where he was appointed Oberhofprediger and Konsistorialrat. In 1809, he was involved in the liturgical reorganization in Württemberg.

Süskind was a disciple of Gottlob Christian Storr, and a prominent member of the so-called Ältere Tübinger Schule (conservative Tübingen theologians). Within this group he excelled in the field of dialectics. His work was primarily directed to the apologetic and dogmatic fundamental questions of Christianity. During his career, he was in constant conflict with proponents of Kantian and Fichtean philosophies.

Along Johann Friedrich Flatt, he was editor of the Magazin für christliche Dogmatik und Moral (Magazine for Christian Dogmatics and Morals).

Süskind died in Stuttgart.

== Selected publications ==
- Über das Recht der Vernunft in Ansehung der negativen Bestimmung der Offenbarung (About the right of reason in view of the negative determination of revelation), (1797).
- In welchem Sinne hat Jesus die Göttlichkeit seiner Religions- und Sittenlehre behauptet? (In what sense has Jesus the divinity of religious and moral claims?), (1802).
- Über die Pestalozzische Methode und ihre Einführung in die Volksschulen (About the Pestalozzi Method and its introduction into elementary schools), (1810).

== Sources ==
- Hermann Ehmer (1996). "Süskind, Friedrich Gottlieb". In Bautz, Traugott (ed.). Biographisch-Bibliographisches Kirchenlexikon (BBKL) (in German). Vol. 11. Herzberg: Bautz. cols. 208–209. ISBN 3-88309-064-6. English translation
