= Peter Heath =

British professor of philosophy

Peter Lauchlan Heath (May 9, 1922 – August 4, 2002) was a British emeritus professor of philosophy at the University of Virginia.

== Life ==
Peter and his twin brother John were born in Milan, where their father had been working for a British firm as an insurance broker. His family returned to Britain when he and his brother were four years old. He went to Shrewsbury School and Magdalen College, Oxford, where he studied Modern Greats.

He translated Johann Gottlieb Fichte's Foundations of the Science of Knowledge (1970) and F. W. J. Schelling's System of Transcendental Idealism (1978) into English.

He died Edinburgh.

== Selected publications ==
=== Translations ===
- Humboldt, Wilhelm von (1988). On language : the diversity of human language-structure and its influence on the mental development of mankind. Internet Archive. Cambridge [Cambridgeshire] ; New York : Cambridge University Press. ISBN 978-0-521-25747-3.
