= System of Transcendental Idealism =

1800 book by Friedrich von Schelling

- Author: Friedrich Wilhelm Joseph Schelling
- Original title: System des transscendentalen Idealismus ^{a}
- Language: German
- Subject: Philosophy
- Published: 1800
- Publication place: Germany
- ^{a} Transzendentalen in contemporary German.

System of Transcendental Idealism (German: System des transscendentalen Idealismus) is a book by Friedrich Wilhelm Joseph Schelling published in 1800.

It has been called Schelling's most important early work, and is best known in the English-speaking world for its influence on the poet and philosopher Samuel Taylor Coleridge. In this work, Schelling attempted to discover the ground of knowledge, within a Kantian framework.

The first complete English translation, by Peter Heath, was published in 1978.

== Overview ==
In this work, Schelling offered an account of the origins of the world (nature or the empirical and phenomenal world), the Absolute (a kind of unconscious, pantheistic God) and the human self.

It is in some ways a Neoplatonic argument, looking for a "first cause" in an entity capable of self-instantiation—a divine will which in this case takes the form of an unconscious pantheistic God but which only comes to self-consciousness in human selves. However, Schelling develops these concepts within the Kantian rules, under which human reason is unable to say much about metaphysics because (as Kant set out in his first Critique) attempts at metaphysical argument generally end up in contradiction.

- For Schelling, nature, the human self and the Absolute are thus not metaphysical entities, but rather entities within a much enlarged domain of phenomena.
- His argument is transcendental, deriving from an analysis of knowledge and mostly not from metaphysical or transcendent claims.
- Since Schelling derives the entities in his system from an analysis of knowledge, they are "critical". They are also ideal in nature (Schelling's is a system of transcendental idealism).
- Schelling offers the first systematic use of dialectic (thesis, antithesis, synthesis), though it is not a term he uses. Dialectic only works if the original term (the thesis) already contains its opposite within itself. Schelling's later philosophy of identity attempted to ground this duality more centrally in the original term.

=== Schelling's premises ===
Schelling has four basic premises:

1. He adopts the correspondence theory of knowledge, the view that truth implies a correspondence between ideas and the realities they represent. It follows that all knowledge requires a relation between a subject (the knowing mind) and an object (the object of knowledge).
2. He assumes that if there is to be a knowledge-relation of subject and object, this must imply an original union of subject and object. This follows from Spinoza's argument that if two existents in any sense exist in the same universe, there must be something common to the two—which is their prior unity.
3. He argues that selfhood is essentially a form of limitation, that to claim to be a self is to delimit oneself from everything outside the self.
4. However, he also argues that the self is actually an act, not an object (Hume had argued that we never experience the self as object).

=== The initial steps in the argument ===
The initial steps in the argument can be displayed schematically as follows:

1. Knowledge is a relation between a subject and an object (premise 1).
2. We thus need a prior ground of subject and object (premise 2).
3. Since this is a prior ground, it can be neither subject nor object, nor describable in terms of any of the categories of knowledge. It is thus not a thing.
4. The prior ground must therefore be an act.
5. Since it is prior to the categories, this act must be without limit—because limitation is a categorical concept.
6. Instantiation requires self-consciousness through limitation (premise 3). If limitation is to occur, it must imply a second limiting act.
7. We thus have two infinite activities, identical but opposed in direction; i.e.:

- the Real: the outward moving blind attempt to intuit the self, as object. Schelling refers to this as "mere activity" (since it is prior to the categories it can have no other predicate), or as "no other than the original, infinitely extending, activity of the self" (STI 39, SW 383-385); and
- the Ideal: the inward-looking attempt to intuit the self within the outward-looking act, thereby limiting it. The Ideal is also a mere activity, distinct from the Real solely in the inward-looking direction of its operation.

=== The dialectic ===
In step 7 we have derived the first two steps in an ongoing dialectic of thesis and antithesis. For while the ideal activity attempts to intuit itself as an object in the real activity, the real activity is not in fact an object: it is an act. And while the real activity is now limited, the ideal activity is still unlimited, so there is no equation of the two activities. A new opposition arises, which requires further steps in the dialectic. And it turns out that there is never a final intuition of the self as object (since the self is not actually an object—premise 4) and the process thus goes on infinitely, through time.

=== The three epochs ===
The dialectical interplay of these activities proceeds through three 'epochs', points where the various existents of the system are produced in a form of unstable equilibrium. They are unstable because the system has no final or stable moment of synthesis. The epochs are:

1. The first epoch, in which the dialectic first gives rise to formless matter or chaos of Plato's Timaeus and of the Book of Genesis. In reaction, the dialectic next gives rise to the Absolute, Schelling's pantheistic God.
2. The second epoch, in which "matter", or the "outer sense" arises. This "matter" is not yet the matter we experience in the empirical world, because Schelling's system is an idealist one, and the actual matter only arises in perception.
3. The third epoch in which the self, continually frustrated in its attempts to intuit itself as object, now feels driven back upon itself. It now attempts to intuit itself within the entire dialectical process which has led to this point, and it does so by moving to a mode of what Schelling calls 'abstraction'.

- In order to make this abstraction, Schelling first derives the categories of the Kantian understanding.
- Schelling calls this move a moment of 'freedom' because it is the moment when the will (a noumenal entity) enters the dialectic and where the outcome is no longer entirely determined by the dialectic itself.

Having derived the Kantian understanding with all its categories, the dialectic now produces the series of perceptions which constitute (on an idealist account) the empirical world of nature.

- In these moments arise both the perceive objects (nature) and the perceiving subjects (the illusory selfhood of humans).
- Because none of these are moments of final synthesis (because the self is not an object and thus cannot be equated with a subject), the series of perceptions is infinite and is the basis of time within Schelling's system.

=== The failed deduction ===
In the introduction to the System and in some of his earlier works, Schelling had promised a deduction in which subject and object are united, but as we have seen, the final deduction is infinitely deferred. The ‘failure’ of the final deduction does not seem to have perturbed Schelling, who proposes (without any particular explanation) his own solution. As Michael Vater puts it, the solution ‘is extra-systematic since on the Fichtean model of consciousness—an activity ever-deflected from complete reflection into unconscious and preconscious production—a fully transparent philosophical moment of self-reflection is not possible’.

=== Art ===
The solution sees what Schelling scholars speak of as the beginning of Schelling's philosophy of identity and turns on an analysis of the aesthetic. Art, he argues, is both a conscious production and thoroughly determined by the unconscious. It is thus a conscious expression of the predicament of consciousness as an attempt to render conscious that (the self-as-object) which is not—not conscious and indeed not even existent or instantiable.

Schelling offers little assistance in explaining what to make of this, though in general terms it reflects a useful conception of art as the one human activity that imitates and symbolises the divine act of creation. Since the entire dialectic has been critical rather than substantial, the fact that art plays merely a formal (and not a substantial) role in concluding the deduction may perhaps be a virtue.

=== The will ===
In addition, since in Schelling there is not actually a final identity of subject and object, what really runs his system is the will, a blind drive towards self-instantiation which belongs within Kant's noumenal sphere, and about which accordingly nothing further can be said. It is not clear, given the Kantian rules, that Schelling is entitled to use the will in this way.

== Reception ==
Schelling's arguments were adopted by Samuel Taylor Coleridge in his Biographia Literaria, where he said:

'DES CARTES, speaking as a naturalist, and in imitation of Archimedes, said, give me matter and motion and I will construct you the universe.... In the same sense the transcendental philosopher says; grant me a nature having two contrary forces, the one of which tends to expand infinitely, while the other strives to apprehend or find itself in this infinity, and I will cause the world of intelligences with the whole system of their representations to rise up before you.

Coleridge had hoped to modify Schelling's argument so as to put it in a conservative, Trinitarian context. However, with half of the Biographia already printed, Coleridge realised that his proposed modifications were not going to work, a crisis he solved by inventing a 'letter from a friend' advising him to skip the deduction and move straight to the conclusion. It was a decision which laid him open to charges of philosophical unseriousness and plagiarism, subjects of much controversy. In the Opus Maximum, Coleridge solved the technical problems he had earlier faced and offered a critique of the form of logic underlying Schelling's system.
