= Biographia Literaria =

Autobiography by Samuel Taylor Coleridge

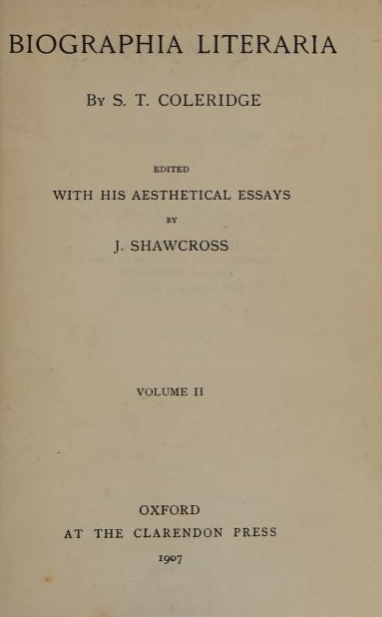
- Title page for Biographia Literaria (1907)
- Author: Samuel Taylor Coleridge
- Language: English
- Published: 1817

The Biographia Literaria ('literary biography') is a critical autobiography by Samuel Taylor Coleridge, published in 1817 in two volumes. Its working title was 'Autobiographia Literaria'. The formative influences on the work were William Wordsworth's theory of poetry, the Kantian view of imagination as a shaping power (for which Coleridge later coined the neologism "esemplastic"), various post-Kantian writers including F. W. J. von Schelling, and the earlier influences of the empiricist school, including David Hartley and the Associationist psychology.

== Structure and tone ==
The work is long and seemingly loosely structured, and although there are autobiographical elements, it is not a straightforward or linear autobiography. Its subtitle, 'Biographical Sketches of My Literary Life and Opinions', alludes to The Life and Opinions of Tristram Shandy, Gentleman by Laurence Sterne, suggesting that the formal qualities of the Biographia are intentional. The form is also meditative. As Kathleen Wheeler shows, the work is playful and acutely aware of the active role of the reader in reading.

== Critical reaction ==
Critics have reacted strongly to the Biographia Literaria. Some early readers thought it demonstrated Coleridge's opiate-driven decline into ill health, and soon after Coleridge's death he was accused of plagiarising Schelling. By the early twentieth century, however, it had emerged as a major if puzzling work in criticism and theory, with George Saintsbury placing Coleridge next to Aristotle and Longinus in his influential History of 1902–04. Recent criticism has been divided between those who think that the Biographia's philosophical pretensions were illusory, and those who take the philosophy seriously. While contemporary critics recognize the degree to which Coleridge borrowed from his sources (with passages lifted straight from Schelling), they also see in the work far more structure and planning than is apparent on first glance.

== Content ==
The work was originally intended as a preface to a collected volume of Coleridge's poems, explaining and justifying his own style and practice in poetry. The work grew to a literary autobiography, covering his education and studies, and his early literary adventures, an extended criticism of William Wordsworth's theory of poetry as given in the Preface to the Lyrical Ballads (a work on which Coleridge collaborated), and a statement of his philosophical views.

== Imagination ==
The first volume is mainly concerned with the evolution of Coleridge's philosophical views. At first an adherent of the associationist psychology of the philosopher David Hartley, he came to discard this mechanical system for the belief that the mind is not a passive but an active agent in the apprehension of reality. The author believed in the "self-sufficing power of absolute Genius" and distinguished between genius and talent as between "an egg and an egg-shell". The first volume culminates in his gnomic definition of the imagination or "esemplastic power", the faculty by which the soul perceives the spiritual unity of the universe, as distinguished from the fancy or merely associative function. Coleridge writes:

The IMAGINATION ... I consider either as primary, or secondary. The primary IMAGINATION I hold to be the living Power and prime Agent of all human Perception, and as a repetition in the finite mind of the eternal act of creation in the infinite I AM.

The famous definition of the imagination emerges from a discussion of Immanuel Kant, Johann Gottlieb Fichte, and Friedrich Wilhelm Joseph von Schelling, amongst others. (Being fluent in German, Coleridge was one of the first major English literary figures to discuss Schelling's ideas, in particular.) The primary imagination is that which we use in our everyday perception of things in the world.

- When Coleridge's God creates nature, He makes nature a reflection of the formal qualities of the Son, the second person in the Trinity. The primary imagination (by which we perceive nature) is thus 'a repetition in the finite mind of the eternal act of creation in the infinite I AM'.
- However, the later Coleridge took a darker view of nature and the human imagination, viewing both as fallen and referring to his definition in the Biographia as 'unformed and immature'.

== Wordsworth and poetic diction ==
The later chapters of the book deal with the nature of poetry and with the question of poetic diction raised by Wordsworth. While maintaining a general agreement with Wordsworth's point of view, Coleridge elaborately refutes his principle that the language of poetry should be one taken with due exceptions from the mouths of men in real life, and that there can be no essential difference between the language of prose and of metrical composition. A critique on the qualities of Wordsworth's poetry concludes the volume.

The book contains Coleridge's celebrated and vexed distinction between "imagination" and "fancy". Chapter XIV is the origin of the famous critical concept of the "willing suspension of disbelief" when reading poetic works.

== The missing transcendental deduction ==
At the beginning of chapter 13, Coleridge attempts to bring his philosophical argument to a head with the following claim:

DESCARTES, speaking as a naturalist, and in imitation of Archimedes, said, give me matter and motion and I will construct you the universe.... In the same sense the transcendental philosopher says; grant me a nature having two contrary forces, the one of which tends to expand infinitely, while the other strives to apprehend or find itself in this infinity, and I will cause the world of intelligences with the whole system of their representations to rise up before you.

The two forces were derived from Schelling's System of Transcendental Idealism of 1800. In that work, Schelling offers the first systematic use of dialectic (thesis, antithesis and synthesis), though it is not a term he uses.

Dialectic only works if the original term (the thesis) already contains its opposite within itself. Schelling derived this original duality by arguing that:

1. knowledge requires a relation between subject and object, and
2. if there is a relation between subject and object, they must have something in common: an original union.

We thus have an origin for all things known in this world, an origin which is both a unity and something characterised by division (into two forces which foreshadow the subject/object distinction). The division supplies the two forces Coleridge mentioned.

Coleridge had clearly hoped to modify Schelling's argument (the transcendental deduction) so as to put it in a conservative, Trinitarian context. However, with half of the Biographia already printed, Coleridge realised that his proposed modifications were not going to work, a crisis he solved by inventing a "letter from a friend" advising him to skip the deduction and move straight to the conclusion. It was a brilliant rhetorical solution, but also a decision which laid him open to charges of philosophical dilettantism and plagiarism, subjects of much controversy. The underlying problem is that Schelling's dialectic does not ever supply a final synthesis in which the two forces find equilibrium (a moment of true self-instantiation), which means that they cannot account for a Trinitarian God who is the origin of all things.

Reid and Perkins argue that in September 1818 Coleridge solved the technical problems he had earlier faced in the Biographia, and that he provides a firmer foundation for the Schelling's two forces in the Opus Maximum, where he offered a critique of the form of logic underlying Schelling's system. In the Opus Maximum the two forces are the ground of the finite or human realm, but the true origin of all things lies in the Trinity. For Coleridge, the Trinity is the form in which the divine will instantiates itself, in a way which avoids the infinite deferral of a final synthesis in Schelling argument, and which does not derive from Schelling's two forces.

== Bibliography ==
- Coleridge, Samuel Taylor. Biographia Literaria. Edited by James Engell. Princeton: PUP/Bollingen, 1983. ISBN 0-691-01861-8
- Coleridge, Samuel Taylor. Biographia Literaria. (1817) Edited by Nigel Leask. (London: J. M. Dent, 1997. ISBN 0-460-87332-6
