= Philosophical Inquiries into the Essence of Human Freedom =

1809 work by Friedrich Schelling

Philosophical Inquiries into the Essence of Human Freedom (German: Philosophische Untersuchungen über das Wesen der menschlichen Freiheit und die damit zusammenhängenden Gegenstände) is an 1809 work by Friedrich Schelling. It was the last book he finished in his lifetime, running to some 90 pages of a single long essay. It is commonly referred to as his "Freiheitsschrift" (freedom text) or "freedom essay".

Described by Hans Urs von Balthasar as "the most titanic work of German idealism", it is also seen as anticipating much of the collection of basic existentialist motifs. Its ambitions were high: to tackle the problem of radical evil, and to innovate at a metaphysical level, in particular to correct dualism. As its title suggests, it intends to give an account of human freedom, and the requirements on the philosophical side to protect this idea from particular formulations, at issue during the period, of determinism.

== Influences on Schelling ==
The literature on the history of philosophy contains many assertions about the general influences on Schelling. There are also more specific comments about other thinkers and traditions that had a definite effect on this transitional work. The opening pages make it clear that Schelling is engaged in arguing against Spinozism, a position which (often simply called "dogmatism") had been a target for both philosophical and religious thinkers in Germany for decades. Schelling was not concerned about rejecting all that Baruch Spinoza's thought implied, in the terms of that debate, but to salvage something from the unification of view (monism) that came with it, while allowing room for freedom.

At this time Schelling was influenced also by Franz Xaver von Baader and the writings of Jakob Böhme. In fact Of Human Freedom contains explicit references to Baader's doctrine of evil, and Böhme's schematic creation myths, and uses the term theosophy; a detailed mapping of Böhme's thought onto Schelling's argument in the Freiheitsschrift has been carried out by Paola Mayer. On the other hand Robert Schneider and Ernst Benz have argued for the more direct influence of the pietist Johann Albrecht Bengel and theosophist Friedrich Christoph Oetinger.

== Themes ==
Explicit concerns of Schelling in the book are: the existence of evil and the emergence into reason. Schelling offers a solution to the first, an old theological chestnut, in brief that “evil makes arbitrary choice possible”. On the other hand, by no means all interpretations of the work come from the direction of theology and the problem of evil. The second idea, requiring a rationale of emergence, was more innovative, because of the place it gave to irrationalism and anthropomorphism, within the "cosmic" setting (which need not be taken literally). The work stands also in relation to a decade of previous publications, formulations, and rivalries.

A view from the nineteenth century is that of Harald Høffding (who sets the book in the context of a supposed personal crisis and philosophical block):

... [Schelling] attempts to show that we are only justified in conceiving God as a personal being if we posit an original antithesis within the absolute, within the essence of the Deity,—a dark irrational ground which becomes purified and harmonised ... in the course of the life-development of the Divine Being. [...] All evil consists in a striving to return to the chaos out of which the order of Nature has proceeded.

Modern readings of Schelling's intentions can differ quite widely from this interpretation (and each other). This writing of Schelling is also seen as the beginning of his critique of Georg Wilhelm Friedrich Hegel, and an announcement of a transitional moment in philosophy; part of the purpose was self-justification, verging on polemic in defence of Schelling's pantheism. It is therefore a signpost marking a fork in the road for what is now called "classical German philosophy": even if it had its time of dominance, absolute idealism in Hegel's sense is (after the "freedom essay") just one branch of the discussion of the Absolute in German idealism. Hegel became a system-builder while Schelling produced no systematic or finished philosophy in three decades after the Freiheitsschrift.

=== Evil as radical ===
The conception of evil is set against both the Neoplatonic privatio boni and the Manichaean division into two disconnected and contending powers. Evil must be seen as active, in both God and natural creatures. There is a distinction: in God evil can never stray out of its place (at the base), while in man it certainly may exceed its role of basing self-hood.

Slavoj Žižek writes that the central tenet is that

...if one is to account for the possibility of Evil, one has to presuppose a split in the Absolute into God insofar as he fully exists, and the obscure, impenetrable Ground of his Existence.

John W. Cooper writes

Either Evil is unreal or God is its cause. Schelling's solution to this perennial problem is to view God's freedom as the possibility of evil and human freedom as responsible for the actuality of evil.

=== Spinoza and pantheism ===
At the time of writing the Freiheitsschrift, Schelling had on his mind an accusation of pantheism, levelled at him by Friedrich Schlegel in Über Sprache und Weisheit der Indier (1808). The German Pantheism controversy of the 1780s continued to cast a long shadow. F. H. Jacobi, who had launched it, was someone with whom Schelling was in contact in Munich, where the book was written.

In his book, Schelling takes up the issue of pantheism, concerned to refute the idea that it necessarily leads to fatalism, so negating human freedom. Here he is closer to Spinoza, erasing the distinction between nature and God. On the other hand, Schelling is trying to overcome the distinction made in Spinoza's system, between natura naturans (dynamic) and natura naturata (passive). Schelling wanted to locate the fatalism in Spinoza, not in the pantheism or monism, but in his formulation.

=== Synthesis claimed ===
According to Andrew Bowie:

The central issue in FS is ... a non-reductionist account of the relationship of thinking to being. Spinoza's system ... is seen as 'one-sidedly realistic' (in the sense of 'materialist'), and as in need of completion by an 'ideal' aspect in which 'freedom reigns'.

Schelling considered that the idealist conception of freedom, in Immanuel Kant and Johann Gottlieb Fichte, had remained undeveloped, absent a cleaner break with the rationalist systems of Spinoza and Gottfried Leibniz, and a distinctive theory of its human element. In another view of the book's main theme, leading onto the further development of the philosophy of the Weltalter (Ages of the World), Schelling

...sought to grasp the dynamic differentiation in God and hence the temporal quality of the divine.

In this approach, the Absolute takes on a darker side, and shows therefore the connection to the theme of the problem of evil. This aspect then pervades all life:

The duality of (blind) nature and (enlightened) existence is not limited to God's original self-construction. It is said to permeate all of creation, which thus repeats on a finite scale the divine process of self-realization from will to reason. In finite individuals the dark, blind will manifests itself as particular will as stands in opposition to the enlightened or universal will.

== Summary ==
This is an approximate summary of the content of the Freiheitsschrift using page numbering as appears in Schelling's Works. There is no division except into paragraphs.

- 336-8 There is a traditional view that system excludes individual freedom; but on the contrary it does have "a place in the universe". This is a problem to solve.
- 338-343 Reformulation as the issue of pantheism and fatalism.
- 343-8 Spinoza and Leibniz.
- 348 German idealism versus French atheistic mechanism; Fichte's Wissenschaftslehre.
- 349-352 It is a mistake to believe that idealism has simply displaced pantheism.
- 352-355 The real conception of freedom is the possibility of good and evil.
- 356-357 Critique of the abstract conception of God; Naturphilosophie.
- 357-358 Ground of God and light.
- 359-366 Critique of immanence.
- 366-373 Conception of evil according to Baader.
- 373-376 Evil is necessary for God's revelation; exegesis of "matter" in Plato.
- 376-7 The irrational element in organic beings; disjunction of light and darkness.
- 379 Golden Age.
- 382-3 Formal conception of freedom; Buridan's Ass.
- 383 Idealism defines freedom.
- 385 Man's being is his own deed.
- 387 Predestination.
- 389-394 General possibility of evil and inversion of selfhood's place.
- 394 God's freedom.
- 396 Leibniz on laws of nature.
- 399 God is not a system, but a life; finite life in man.
- 402 God brought forward order from chaos.
- 403 History is incomprehensible without a concept of a humanly suffering God.
- 406 Primal ground (Ungrund) is before all antitheses; groundlessness self-divides.
- 409 Evil is a parody.
- 412 Revelation and reason.
- 413 Paganism and Christianity.
- 413 Personality rests on a dark foundation, which is also the foundation of knowledge.
- 414 Dialectical philosophy.
- 415 Historical foundation of philosophy.
- 416 Nature as revelation, and its archetypes. Promise of further treatises.

== A debated transition ==
Schelling placed the Freiheitsschrift at the end of the first volume of his Sämmtliche Werke (Collected Works). The correct periodisation of his philosophy is still a contentious area, and there are differing views of what kind of punctuation mark it really represents in Schelling's work. It is admittedly important that the book itself begins with an outright rejection of “system”. The publication of this book is said, on the one hand, to mark the beginning of Schelling's “middle period”. As such it marks the break with the “identity philosophy” on which he worked in the first decade of the nineteenth century, after his beginnings as a follower of Johann Fichte and developer of Naturphilosophie.

The divergence of Schelling and Hegel becomes clear from around this year, with Hegel's ambitions being systematic and explicitly encyclopedic, notions of freedom being quite different, and the use of dialectic becoming obviously distinct on the two sides. Hegel's star was in the ascendent, while Schelling's other road led into the wilderness, at least as far as academic respectability was concerned. Academic recognition for Schelling's work as important to philosophy, as opposed to an idiosyncratic contribution to philosophy of religion, was indeed slow to come. Samuel Taylor Coleridge, one of Schelling's contemporaries and followers, rated it highly.

In 1936, Martin Heidegger gave a series of lectures on Schelling's freedom essay. These were published in German in 1971 and translated into English in 1984. Heidegger largely treated the Freiheitsschrift as continuous with the "identity philosophy" period leading up to it. Heidegger by 1941 had hardened his line to the position that Schelling is still a theorist of an enclosing subjectivity, while treating the Freiheitsschrift as the apex (Gipfel) of the metaphysics of German idealism. This view is still contested: other authors read the book as the start of something new in philosophy. Schelling's Stuttgart Vorlesungen of 1810 reformulate and build on the freedom essay, and the Weltalter manuscripts go further in trying to work out details of the Behmenist insights. The debate is therefore really whether the Freiheitsschrift is culminating, seminal, or possibly both.

== English translations ==
- James Gutmann (1936), Of Human Freedom
- Jeff Love and Johannes Schmidt (2006), Philosophical Investigations into the Essence of Human Freedom
