= The It Girl (novel) =

Novel by Cecily von Ziegesar

- Author: Anonymous ghostwriter for Cecily von Ziegesar
- Language: English
- Series: The It Girl
- Genre: Young adult novel
- Publisher: Little, Brown
- Publication date: 2005
- Publication place: United States
- Media type: Print (Paperback) & AudioBook (MP3 CD)
- Pages: 272 pp
- ISBN: 978-0-316-01185-3
- OCLC: 60705439
- LC Class: PZ7.V94 It 2005
- Followed by: Notorious

The It Girl is the first book in The It Girl series. It was written in 2005 by a ghostwriter with suggestions from Cecily von Ziegesar. It is a spin-off from the Gossip Girl series aimed toward young adults. The book follows Jenny Humphrey as she enrolls at an elite boarding school in Upstate New York.

The cover model for the first edition (illustrated) is Hope Hicks, who would later be appointed as White House Communications Director in September 2017.

== Plot ==
After being kicked out of her former school, Jenny Humphrey enrolls at the posh Waverly Academy located in Upstate New York. Jenny hopes to leave her unsophisticated past behind and reinvent herself. She meets her new roommates Callie Vernon and Brett Messerschmidt, two of the most popular girls on campus. Jenny occupies the third bed in the triple that used to belong to Tinsley Carmichael, who was expelled the previous year for getting caught with Ecstasy on campus.

Jenny attends the first party of the year, unaware of the gossip already swirling about her. She accepts an invitation from charmingly sloppy Heath Ferro to go into the school chapel alone. Jenny allows Heath to kiss her, but is dismayed when he passes out in her lap. Jenny walks him to his dorm and leaves, but the next day, Heath brags about having had sex with her in the chapel.

Callie's relationship with her boyfriend Easy Walsh has hit a rut. Callie invites him to her room, unaware Jenny is also there, trying to sleep. Jenny is discovered and a frustrated Callie leaves to go to the bathroom. Easy is surprised at his attraction to Jenny, but their conversation is interrupted by the dorm supervisor's husband, Mr. Pardee. Realizing she could be expelled for having Easy in her room, Callie convinces Mr. Pardee that Easy was visiting Jenny and not her. Easy and Jenny are each called in separately to meet with their student advisor, Eric Dalton, who decides the matter will be resolved in a disciplinary hearing.

Co-captain of the field hockey team Celine Colista pressures Callie to select Jenny to be the target of the year's hazing ritual at the field hockey match against St. Lucius. Initially mortified when she realizes the prank, Jenny quickly turns the cheer around and becomes one of the most popular girls in the school. Later, at Heath Ferro's party, Easy and Jenny admit their feelings for each other.

The next day, the girls are forced to play a scrimmage, despite being hungover and tired from the party. Callie and Brett almost get into a fight over who sold Tinsley out before realizing Tinsley took all the blame herself. Brett and Eric begin an affair and Brett ends her relationship with her boyfriend Jeremiah.

Sensing Easy's affections waning, Callie attempts to seduce him in the rare book room in the library but becomes frustrated when Easy does not reciprocate. Easy becomes frustrated when Callie tries to grill him on his future comments at the upcoming disciplinary hearing. The two fight and Easy breaks up with Callie.

The next day, at the disciplinary hearing, Easy is found guilty but is let off easy, as he is a legacy child. As Jenny and her roommates celebrate, Dean Marymount interrupts, announcing Tinsley Carmichael's return.
