= Von Ziegesar =

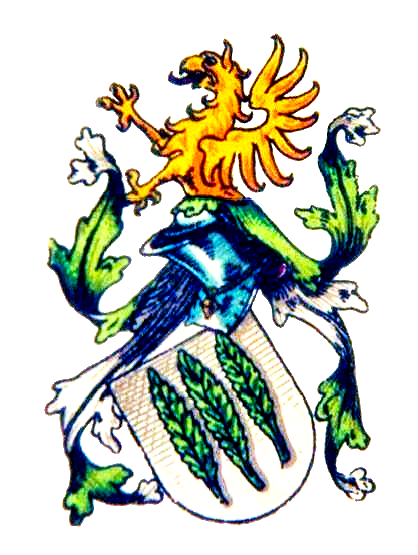
Coat of arms

The Ziegesar family or von Ziegesar is an old German noble family, belonging to the uradel of the Margraviate of Brandenburg.

== History ==
The family first appeared in written documents in 1204 with Otto von Segesere as castellan of Burg Ziesar. There were two lines of the family, one, elder in the Electorate of Saxony, whose founder was Christian Ehrenfried von Ziegesar (1632–1708) and the other, younger one in Thuringia, founded by Christian's younger brother, Adolph von Ziegesar (1633–1693). In 1812 Carl August Ludwig Adolf von Ziegesar (1776-1829) was awarded with the hereditary title of Baron in Nassau by Frederick Augustus, Duke of Nassau.

== Notable members ==
- Sylvie von Ziegesar (1785–1858), German intellectual
- Elisabeth von Ziegesar (1856–1887), wife of Prince Julius of Schleswig-Holstein-Sonderburg-Glücksburg
- Peter von Ziegesar (born 1952), American writer
- Cecily von Ziegesar (born 1970), American writer, writer and creator of the Gossip Girl series
