= Ernst Christian Gottlieb Reinhold =

German philosopher (1793–1855)

- Born: 18 October 1793; Jena, Saxe-Weimar, Holy Roman Empire
- Died: 17 September 1855 (aged 61); Jena, Saxe-Weimar-Eisenach, German Confederation
- Father: Karl Leonhard Reinhold
- Relatives: Christoph Martin Wieland (grandfather)

Education
- Education: University of Kiel (PhD)

Philosophical work
- Era: 19th-century philosophy
- Region: Western philosophy
- School: Kantianism
- Institutions: University of Kiel; University of Jena
- Main interests: Metaphysics, logic, epistemology, history of philosophy

Ernst Christian Gottlieb Reinhold (German: [ˈʁaɪnhɔlt]; 18 October 1793 – 17 September 1855) was a German philosopher. He was the son of Karl Leonhard Reinhold and grandchild of Christoph Martin Wieland.

He at first lectured on philosophy at the University of Kiel, and afterwards was appointed professor of logic and metaphysics at the University of Jena. His philosophical system resembles Immanuel Kant's.

== Works ==
- Versuch einer Begründung und neuen Darstellung der logischen Formen (1819).
- Grundzüge eines Systems der Erkenntnisslehre und Denklehre (1822).
- Die Logik oder die allgemeine Denkformenlehre (1827). Google (UMich)
- Beitrag zur Erläuterung der pythagoreischen Metaphysik (1827).
- Handbuch der allgemeinen Geschichte der Philosophie (1828–1830). 2 volumes (in 3).
  - Volume 1, 1828. Google (NYPL) Google (UCal) Google (UWisc)
  - Volume 2, Part 1, 1829. Google (NYPL) Google (UCal)
  - Volume 2, Part 2, 1830. Google (NYPL) Google (UCal)
  - 3rd. ed., 1845. 2 Volumes. Geschichte der Philosophie nach den Hauptmomenten ihrer Entwickelung.
    - Volume 1. Google (Oxford)
    - Volume 2. Google (Oxford)
- Theorie des menschlichen Erkenntnissvermögens und Metaphysik (1832–35). 2 volumes.
  - Volume 1, 1832.
  - Volume 2, 1835. Google (Harvard)
- Lehrbuch der philosophisch-propädeutischen Psychologie nebst den Grundlagen der formalen Logik (1835).
  - 2nd ed., 1839. Lehrbuch der philosophisch-propädeutischen Psychologie und formale Logik.
- Lehrbuch der Geschichte der Philosophie (1836). 2nd ed., 1839. 3rd ed., 1849.
- Die Wissenschaften der praktischen Philosophie im Grundrisse (1837). 3 volumes. Google (Harvard)
- System der Metaphysik (1842). 3rd ed., 1854.
- Ueber das Wesen der Religion und seinen Ausdruck im evangelischen Christenthum (1846).
