= Karl Leonhard Reinhold =

Austrian philosopher (1757–1823)

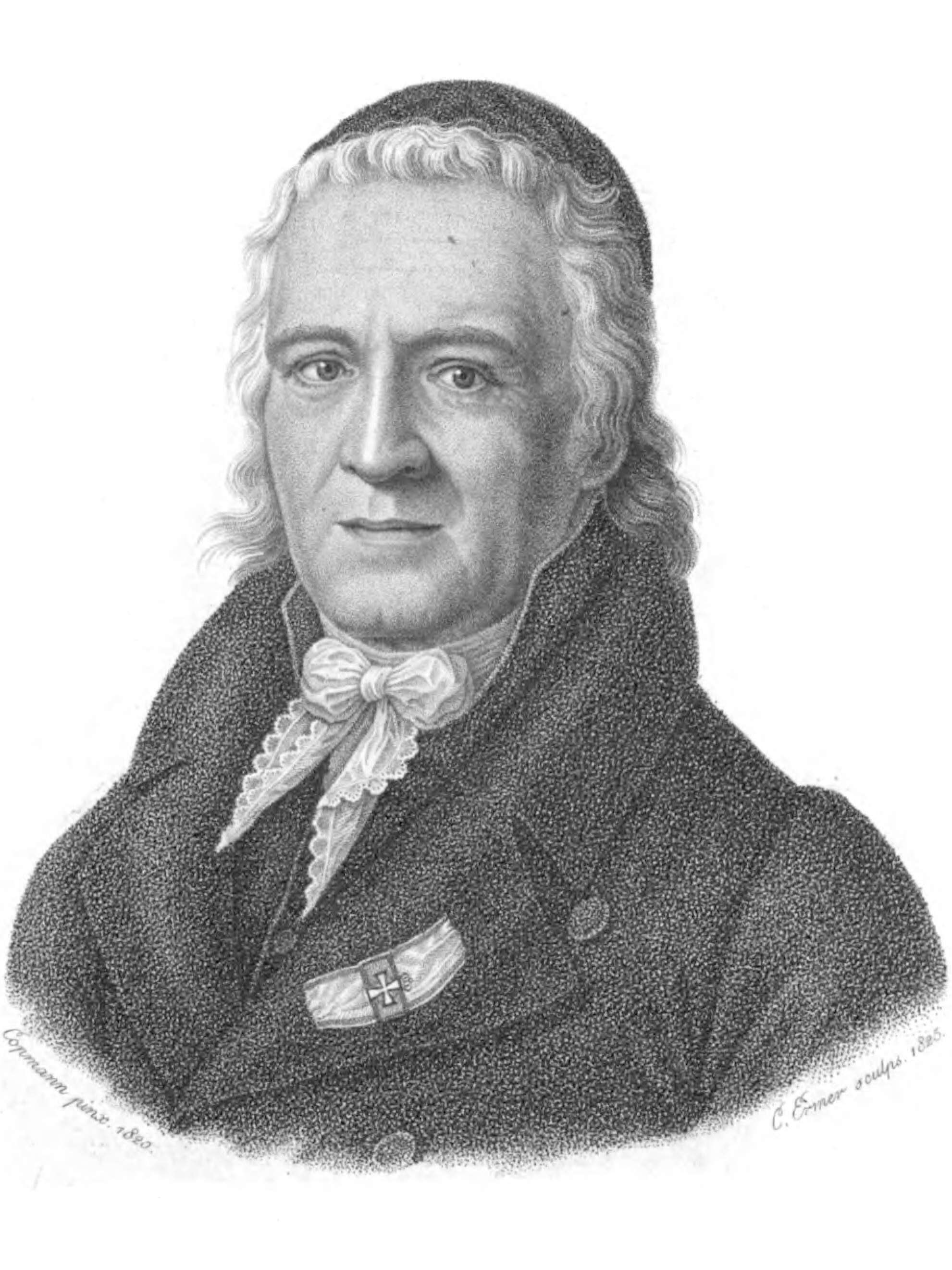
- Reinhold by Peter Copmann, 1820
- Born: 26 October 1757; Vienna, Archduchy of Austria
- Died: 10 April 1823 (aged 65); Kiel, German Confederation
- Spouse: Sophie Katharina Susanne Wieland
- Children: 6, including Ernst
- Relatives: Christoph Martin Wieland (father-in-law)

Education
- Education: Jesuitenkollegium St. Anna (1772–1773); Barnabitenkollegium St. Michael (1773–1778); University of Leipzig (1784; no degree)
- Academic advisors: Immanuel Kant (epistolary correspondent); Ernst Platner

Philosophical work
- Era: 18th-century philosophy
- Region: Western philosophy
- School: Austrian Enlightenment (early); German idealism
- Institutions: Barnabitenkollegium St. Michael (1778–1783); University of Jena (1787–1794); University of Kiel (1794–1823)
- Notable students: Friedrich von Hardenberg; Friedrich Immanuel Niethammer; Friedrich Adolf Trendelenburg
- Main interests: Epistemology, transcendental philosophy, philosophy of language, ethics
- Notable works: Letters on the Kantian Philosophy (1786–89); Essay Towards a New Theory of the Human Faculty of Representation (1789)
- Notable ideas: Elementary philosophy (Elementarphilosophie), principle of consciousness (Satz des Bewußtseins), mutual dependence of thought and language

Ecclesiastical career
- Religion: Christianity
- Church: Catholic Church
- Ordained: 1780
- Laicized: 1783

Karl Leonhard Reinhold (/ˈraɪnhoʊld/; Austrian German: [ˈraɪnhɔld]; 26 October 1757 – 10 April 1823) was an Austrian philosopher who helped to popularise the work of Immanuel Kant in the late 18th century. His "elementary philosophy" (Elementarphilosophie) also influenced German idealism, notably Johann Gottlieb Fichte, as a critical system grounded in a fundamental first principle.

He was the father of Ernst Christian Gottlieb Reinhold (1793–1855), also a philosopher.

== Life ==
Reinhold was born in Vienna. In late 1772, at the age of fourteen, he entered the Jesuit (Roman Catholic) seminary St. Anne's Church, Vienna (Jesuitenkollegium St. Anna). He studied there for a year, until the order was suppressed in 1773, at which time he joined a similar Viennese Catholic college of the Barnabites, the Barnabitenkollegium St. Michael. In 1778, he became a teacher at the Barnabitenkollegium, on 27 August 1780, he was ordained as a Catholic priest, on 30 April 1783, he became a member of the Viennese Freemasons' lodge "Zur wahren Eintracht", and in September 1783, he became a member of the Illuminati.

Finding himself out of sympathy with monastic life, he fled on 19 November 1783 to Leipzig, where he converted to Protestantism. In 1784, after studying philosophy for a semester at Leipzig, he settled in Weimar, where he became Christoph Martin Wieland's collaborator on the German Mercury (Der Teutsche Merkur), and eventually his son-in-law. Reinhold married Wieland's daughter Sophia Catharina Susanna Wieland (19 October 1768 – 1 September 1837) on 18 May 1785. In the German Mercury Reinhold published, in the years 1786–89, his Briefe über die Kantische Philosophie (Letters on the Kantian Philosophy; later published in two volumes in 1790 and 1792, respectively), which were most important in making Immanuel Kant known to a wider circle of readers. As a result of these Letters, Reinhold received a call to the University of Jena, where he taught from 1787 to 1794.

In 1788, Reinhold published Hebräischen Mysterien oder die älteste religiöse Freymaurerey (The Hebrew Mysteries; or, The Oldest Form of Freemasonry) under the pseudonym Decius. The fundamental idea of this work is that Moses derived his system from the Egyptian priesthood. He presented them in the form of two lectures in Leipzig that year.

In 1789, he published his chief work, the Versuch einer neuen Theorie des menschlichen Vorstellungsvermögens (Essay Towards a New Theory of the Faculty of Representation), in which he attempted to simplify the Kantian theory and make it more of a unity by basing it on one principle, Reinhold's principle of consciousness (Satz des Bewußtseins). In 1794 he accepted a call to the University of Kiel, where he taught until his death in 1823, although his independent activity had come to an end.

In later life, he was powerfully influenced by J. G. Fichte, and subsequently by F. H. Jacobi and Christoph Gottfried Bardili. However, his historical importance belongs entirely to his earlier activity. The development of the Kantian standpoint contained in the New Theory (1789), and in the Fundament des philosophischen Wissens (1791), was called by its author Elementarphilosophie.

Reinhold lays greater emphasis than Kant upon the unity and activity of consciousness. The principle of consciousness tells us that every idea is related both to an object and a subject, and is partly to be distinguished from and partly united to both. Since form cannot produce matter and a subject cannot produce an object, we are forced to assume a thing-in-itself. This is a notion which is self-contradictory if consciousness were to be essentially a relating activity. There is therefore something which must be thought and yet cannot be thought.

In 1806, Reinhold published Versuch einer Critik der Logik aus dem Gesichtspunkt der Sprache (Attempt at a Critique of Logic from the Perspective of Language), in which he maintained that thinking cannot be separated from language, a claim that would later occupy a central place in his philosophy of language. This approach was further developed in his 1812 Grundlegung einer Synonymik für den allgemeinen Sprachgebrauch in den philosophischen Wissenschaften (Groundwork of a Synonymic for the Universal Use of Language in the Philosophical Sciences), which marked a new phase in his philosophical thought by seeking to ground philosophy in a critique of language.

== Philosophical work ==
=== Letters on the Kantian Philosophy ===
As a former Catholic priest, Reinhold retained the values of Christian morality and individual dignity. The basic Christian doctrines of a transcendent God and an immortal human soul were presuppositions in his thinking. Reinhold tried to show that Kant's philosophy provided an alternative to either religious revelation or philosophical skepticism and fatalistic pantheism. But Kant's Critique of Pure Reason was a difficult and confusing book. It was not widely read and had little influence. Reinhold decided to write his comments on it in the literary journal The German Mercury. He skipped over the beginning and middle of the book and started at the end. Reinhold showed that the book was best read backwards, that is, starting with the end section. The last part of the Critique is where Kant discussed the issues of morality and their relation to the Rational Ideas of God, Free Will, and life after death. These issues were Reinhold's main concern. By presenting these concerns to the public, instead of the extremely difficult epistemology that took up most of the beginning and middle of the book, Reinhold aroused great interest. As a result, Kant's Critique immediately became a book of great importance.

According to historian of philosophy Karl Ameriks, "Fichte, Hegel, Schelling, Schiller, Hölderlin, Novalis, and Friedrich Schlegel all developed their thought in reaction to Reinhold's reading of Kant..." There is a Faustian tendency in Reinhold's assertion that a person can hope for a future reward only because that person is constantly striving to be good. It is not moral to be good merely in the hope of reward. Reinhold's emphasis on history is evident in his declaration that philosophies and religions are to be judged on the way that they respond to the needs of reason in a particular era. Philosophical development, to him, has an underlying rationality. New philosophies are fated to struggle repeatedly in order to survive in a dialectic of history in which progress is unconsciously occurring. With regard to a transcendent God, the human internal moral law is externalized in such a deity. This extreme otherness or alienation is part of a rational process. It makes possible a subsequent deeper regaining of the self through something other than the self.

=== Establishing Kant on secure ground ===
Kant's critical philosophy was not being accepted as the final truth. According to Professor George di Giovanni, of McGill University, Reinhold tried to provide a foundation for Kant's philosophy in order to remedy this situation. Reinhold distinguished two levels of philosophy. The most basic level was the concern with consciousness and the representations that occurred in it. The second, less basic, level, was the concern with the possibility and structure of the known or desired objects.

Kant's important realization was that the possibility of metaphysics can be established. This can be done only by describing what occurs when the mind is conscious of objects. Kant's weakness was in being overly concerned with the objects themselves. He remained at the second, less basic, level of philosophy. He rarely examined what occurred in consciousness, which is the basic level of philosophy. Kant did not provide a phenomenological description of consciousness. Reinhold was convinced that Kant should have identified the fundamental fact of consciousness that was essential in making cognition itself possible.

Reinhold's Essay Towards a New Theory of the Human Faculty of Representation is a description of the main parts and attributes of consciousness. In writing this book, Reinhold turned his attention from the moral issues that Kant addressed in the end section of his Critique of Pure Reason to the epistemological concerns of the beginning and middle sections.

- General theory of representation
  - The thing-in-itself necessarily exists, but cannot be known.
  - Human knowledge is restricted to appearances only.
  - Reinhold's principle of consciousness – The thinking subject distinguishes, in his/her consciousness, the representation or mental image from both the observing subject and the observed object.
    - This is a certain fact of consciousness.
    - The observing subject is the location of the representation or mental image.
    - The observed object is anything that is represented as being present to the mind of the observing subject.

Reinhold examined the necessary conditions of representation, such as subject and object, that must exist in order for an object to be consciously present.

- Representation's material and form
  - The representation's material (Stoff) is a given or received manifold of sensation which is unified when it is attributed to a transcendental object. It allows the thinking subject to distinguish a thing-in-itself.
  - The representation's form is a spontaneous unifying act which occurs according to the subject's conditions. It allows the thinking subject to distinguish a self-in-itself.
  - The self-in-itself and the thing-in-itself must be assumed in order for the thinking subject to be able to make a distinction between consciousness itself and the object of consciousness.
- We can never know anything in itself, that is, as not representation. An object-in-Itself or subject-in-itself does not have matter (sensation) or representational form, so they cannot be known. Only that which is represented can be known
- Consciousness must contain representation.
  - An empirical representation takes its material from a source that is supposed to be external to it.
  - A pure representation takes its material by reflecting on consciousness
  - A clear and distinct consciousness of an object is an awareness that consciousness itself is a representation in a subject of an external object.
- Special theory of cognition
  - Cognition is clear, distinct knowledge that consciousness contains a representation of an object.
    - Cognition is consciousness's awareness that its own content is a subject's representation of an object.

== Works ==
In English translation

- Essay on a New Theory of the Human Capacity for Representation, Berlin-Boston: Walter de Gruyter, 2011. ISBN 978-3110227406
- Karl Ameriks (ed.), Letters on the Kantian Philosophy, Cambridge: Cambridge University Press, 2005. ISBN 978-0521830232
- The Foundation of Philosophical Knowledge, trans. George di Giovonni. In Between Kant and Hegel: Texts in the Development of Post-Kantian Idealism, ed. George di Giovanni and H. S. Harris, Albany: SUNY Press, 1985, pp. 52–106 (partial translation).
- Sabine Roehr, A Primer on German Enlightenment: With a Translation of Karl Leonhard Reinhold's “The Fundamental Concepts and Principles of Ethics”, Columbia: University of Missouri Press, 1995, pp. 157–251 (partial translation).

== See also ==
- Friedrich Heinrich Jacobi
- Salomon Maimon
- Gottlob Ernst Schulze
