= The It Girl (novel series) =

Book series

- Author: Created by Cecily von Ziegesar
- Language: English
- Genre: Young adult novel
- Publisher: New York Publishing
- Publication date: 2005–2010
- Publication place: United States
- Media type: Print Paperback

The It Girl is a series of novels created by bestselling novelist Cecily von Ziegesar. The series is ghostwritten from the original idea by von Ziegesar. The series, aimed toward young adults, is a spin-off from the bestselling Gossip Girl series.

== Series ==
- The It Girl (2005)
- Notorious (2006)
- Reckless (2006)
- Unforgettable (2007)
- Lucky (2007)
- Tempted (2008)
- Infamous (2008)
- Adored (2009)
- Devious (2009)
- Classic (2010)
- Dreaming (2010)

== Synopsis ==
Jenny Humphrey is leaving the Constance Billard School for Girls to attend Waverly Academy, an elite boarding school in New York horse country where glamorous rich kids don't let the rules get in the way of an excellent time. Jenny is determined to leave her crazy Manhattan past behind and become a sophisticated goddess on campus. But first she'll have to contend with her self-absorbed roommates, Callie Vernon and Brett Messerschmidt. Hot guys, intrigue, and gossip all add up to more trouble than ever for Jenny.

Jenny desperately wants to gain Tinsley's acceptance and finally be a part of the popular crowd, but along the way she begins to wonder what price she will have to pay. To make matters worse she falls hard for Callie's estranged boyfriend, Easy, and is forced to choose between the boy she thinks she loves and her new friends.

== Characters ==
=== Major characters ===
- Jenny Humphrey, the main character of The It Girl, arrives at Waverly Academy after having been expelled from Manhattan's Constance Billard School for Girls. Jenny is eager to reinvent herself as "New Jenny," a more confident and more popular version of her former self, and to make an impression on her new classmates.
- Callie Vernon, with her strawberry-blond hair and warm hazel eyes, her all-preppy look suits her position as daughter of the governor of Georgia. She was previously involved with Brandon Buchanan before the novels began, but left him for Easy Walsh.
- Brett Lenore Messerschmidt, smart, driven, and an all-rounder aiming to get into Brown, Brett is also one of Waverly's elite. She is originally from New Jersey, but hides the fact that her parents are extremely tasteless with their money.
- Tinsley Adea Carmichael, the leader of Waverly's elite, makes a dramatic return in Notorious, after being unceremoniously kicked out at the end of her sophomore year for getting caught taking ecstasy with Callie Vernon and Brett Messerschmidt
- Easy Walsh, an artsy, good-looking young man with a passion for both art and horseback riding. Much like with Nate Archibald, he comes from an old-money family. He is involved with both Callie and Jenny at various points in the series.
- Brandon Buchanan, who despite being dumped by Callie Vernon for Easy Walsh, he remains hopelessly in love with Callie, hoping to win her back someday

=== Minor characters ===
- Heath Ferro, Brandon's roommate is an attractive, wealthy, egotistical womanizer, equally good at being obnoxious and being a gossip as any girl at Waverly. In the first book his nickname is Pony.
- Kara Whalen, Brett's girlfriend and Jenny's close friend. Her mother is a famous fashion designer, which attracts the attention of Tinsley
- Benny Cunningham, a girl with brown hair and brown eyes, is a friend of Tinsley, Callie, and Brett, and Sage's best friend
- Isaac Dresden, the son of the new dean, Dr. Henry Dresden, and brother to Isla Dresden
- Isla Dresden, the daughter of the new dean, Dr. Henry Dresden, and sister to Isaac Dresden. She goes from being Tinsley's best friend to her worst enemy.
- Sage Francis, initially thought to be just another ditzy, blonde, gossiping minion of Callie's. She is best friends with Benny Cunningham.
- Julian McCafferty, who despite being a freshman, hangs out with the junior-year boys in his dorm, usually Heath Ferro and Brandon Buchanan
- Yvonne Stidder, the first girl Jenny meets at Waverly
- Alan St. Girard, the roommate of Easy Walsh
- Alison Quinton, the girlfriend of Alan, and friend of Benny, Sage, Callie, Brett, and Tinsley
- Sebastian Valenti, a student Brett tutors and later falls for

=== Faculty at Waverly Academy ===
- Ben Greenwood, the groundskeeper at Waverly
- Mrs. Horniman, one of Waverly's advisors
- Monsieur Lamont, the French teacher at Waverly
- Dean Marymount, a stickler for rules, is the Dean of Waverly up until Devious, after which Dr. Henry Dresden replaces him
- Ms. Nemerov, the tennis coach at Waverly
- Ms. Mariel Pritchard, one of Waverly's advisors
- Ms. Kathryn Rose, Jenny's English teacher
- Coach Smail, the girls' field hockey coach
- Mr. Shepard, head of the theater department
- Professor Dunderdorf, Brandon's and Heath's German teacher
- Ms. Silver, Jenny, Easy, and Alison Quinton's art teacher
- Ms. Angela Paradee, House mother of Dumbarton (the girl's dorm of Tinsley, Jenny, Brett, Callie, Kara, Benny, Sage, Yvonne, Alison, and most of the girls mentioned in the series). Gets caught in an affair with Dean Marymount by Tinsley, Heath, and Callie at the ritz hotel the morning after their party.
- Mr. Eric Dalton, Latin teacher and adviser of Tinsley, Easy, Brett, and Jenny. Was involved with Brett and flirted with Tinsley. Got framed and fired for offering weed to Brett.

== Reception ==
Scholars have criticized the series as a low quality series fiction aimed at teenage girls, focused on activities such as "frenzied shopping, gossiping, partying, and sexual encounters", and portraying beauty and wealth as most important and desirable qualities.
