= Sylvie von Ziegesar =

German intellectual

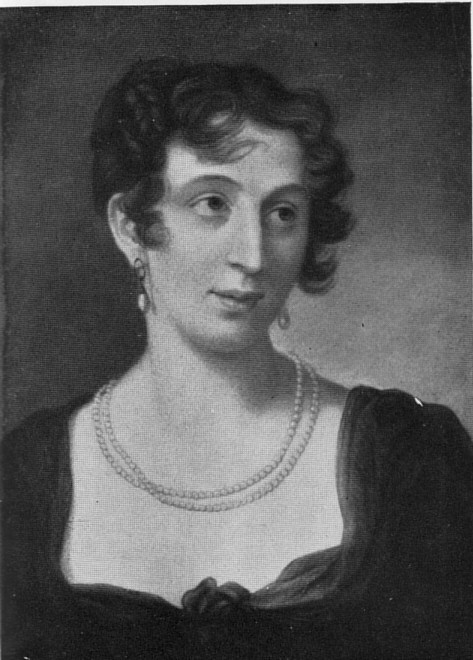
- Born: 21 June 1785; Drackendorf; Jena, Germany
- Died: 13 February 1858 (aged 72)
- Noble family: Ziegesar
- Father: Baron August Friedrich Carl von Ziegesar
- Mother: Baroness Magdalene Auguste von Ziegesar

Baroness Sylvie von Ziegesar (21 June 1785 – 13 February 1858) was a German noblewoman active in the intellectual circles of Weimar Classicism. She was a friend of the painter Louise Seidler and the intellectual Pauline Gotter, and was also the subject of Goethe's poem "To Sylvie von Ziegesar".

== Life ==
Born into the Ziegesar family, on her family's estate in Drackendorf near Jena, Germany on June 21, 1785, Sylvie von Ziegesar was a daughter of Baron August Friedrich Carl von Ziegesar, a privy councilor of Gotha, and Baroness Magdalene Auguste von Ziegesar.

According to researchers at the British Library, Sylvie von Ziegesar was well acquainted with Johann Wolfgang von Goethe:

Goethe was accustomed to stay with his friends, the Ziegesar family, in Drackendorf, an area of Jena just below the Lobdeburg, and the ruins were a favourite destination for walks with the young daughter of the house, Sylvie von Ziegesar, one walk in particular delighting him so much that he celebrated by composing the poem "Bergschloss" in 1802.

According to a 2014 Thüringer Allgemeine article, "In Drackendorf erlebte Goethe glückliche Stunden und späte Liebe" ("In Drackendorf Goethe experienced happy hours and late love"), their relationship was much closer. Goethe stayed at the Ziegesar's home more than 30 times and had fallen in love with Sylvie as early as 1802. In a note penned to her nephew, she stated, "Goethe wrote this ['Bergschloss'] in my corner table at my sewing table for me."
