= Madonna del Granduca =

Painting by Raphael

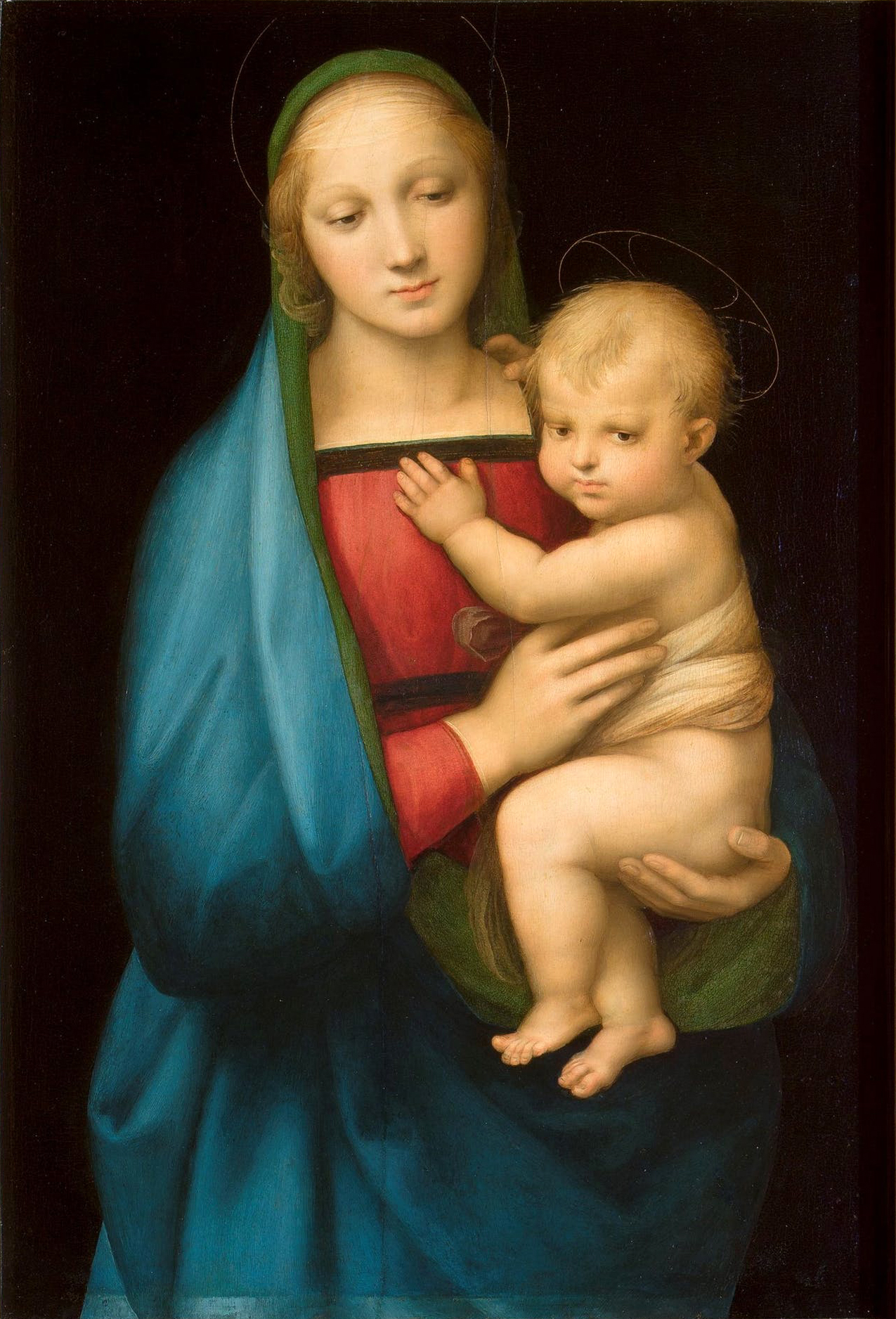
- Artist: Raphael
- Year: c. 1505
- Medium: Oil on wood
- Dimensions: 84 cm × 55 cm (33 in × 22 in)
- Location: Palazzo Pitti, Florence

The Madonna del Granduca is a Madonna painting by the Italian renaissance artist Raphael. It was probably painted in 1505, shortly after Raphael had arrived in Florence. The influence of Leonardo da Vinci, whose works he got to know there, can be seen in the use of sfumato. The painting belonged to Ferdinand III, Grand Duke of Tuscany, from whom it got its name.

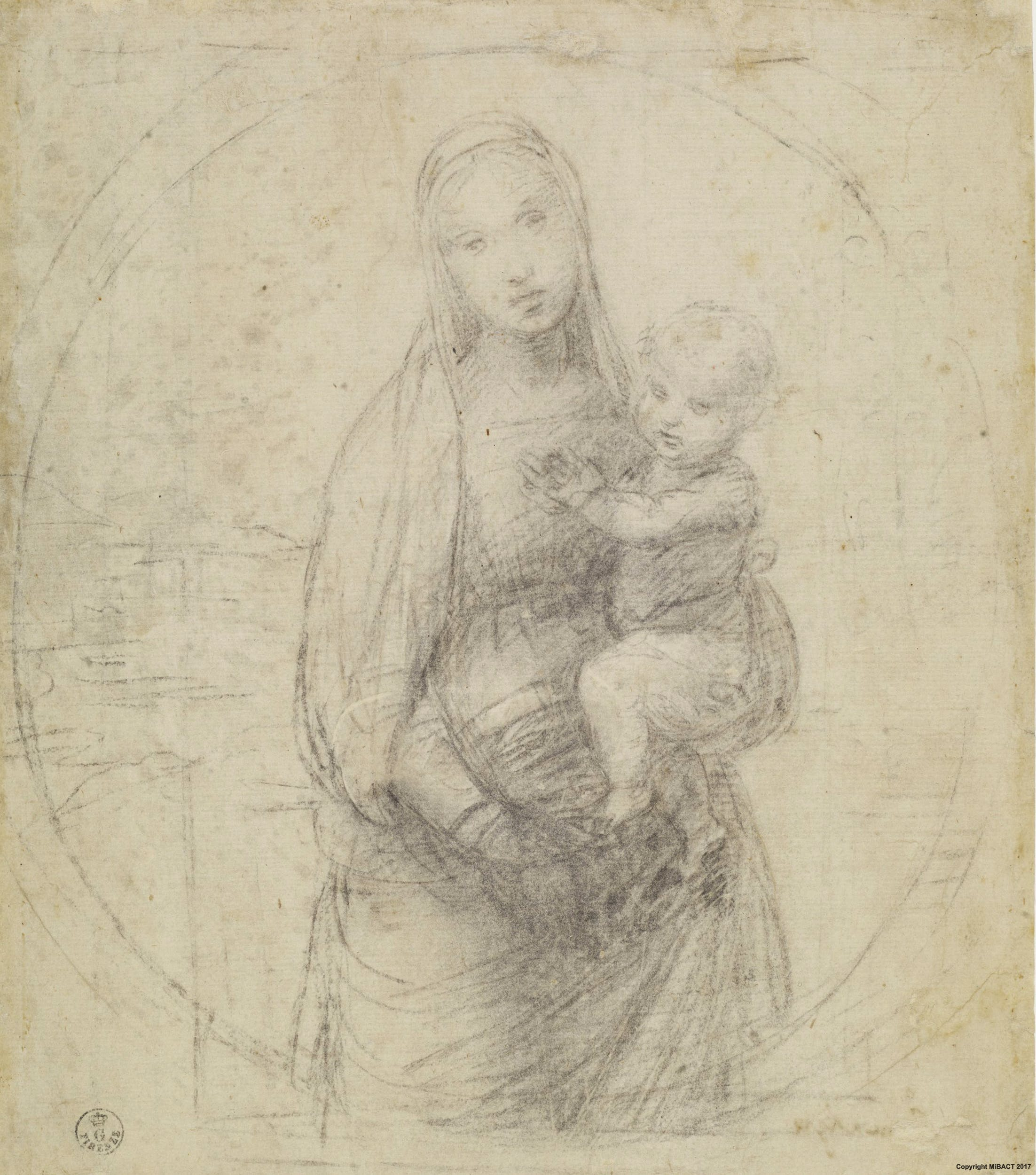
Compositional study for the painting

== See also ==
- List of paintings by Raphael
