= Johann Friedrich Flatt =

German Protestant theologian and philosopher

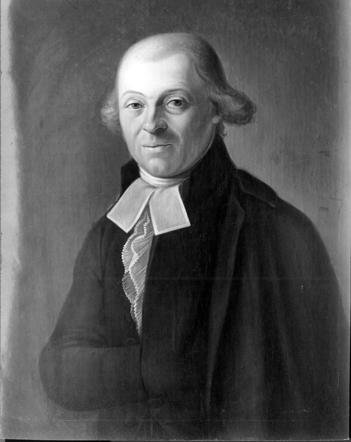
Johann Friedrich Flatt (1759–1821)

Johann Friedrich Flatt (20 February 1759 – 24 November 1821) was a German Protestant theologian and philosopher.

== Life ==
Johann Friedrich Flatt was born and died in Tübingen. His brother, Carl Christian von Flatt (1772–1813), was also a theologian.

He studied philosophy and theology at Tübinger Stift, afterwards continuing his education at the University of Göttingen. In 1785 he became a professor of philosophy at the University of Tübingen, where in 1792 he was appointed an associate professor of theology.

At Tübingen, he was a disciple of Gottlob Christian Storr, and like his mentor, a representative of the so-called "Ältere Tübinger Schule" (conservative Tübingen school of theologians) of Biblical Supranaturalism. In 1798 he succeeded Storr as a full professor of theology at Tübingen.

Flatt is remembered as a defender of Christian moral theology, and for his critical lectures in regard to Kantian philosophy. Along with Friedrich Gottlieb Süskind, he was an editor of the Magazin für christliche Dogmatik und Moral (Magazine of Christian Dogmatics and Morals).

== Selected publications ==
- Briefe über den moralischen Erkenntnisgrund der Religion überhaupt, und besonders in Beziehung auf die Kantische Philosophie (Tübingen 1788).
- Commentatio symbolic in qua Ecclesiae nostrae de deitate Christi sententia probatur et vindicatur, (1788).
- Observationes quaedam ad comparandam Kantianam cum disciplina christiana relevant doctrine, (1792).
- Vorlesungen über christliche Moral ("Lectures on Christian morals"), 1823.
- Vorlesungen über die Briefe Pauli an den Timotheus und Titus ("Lectures on the letters of Saint Paul to Timothy and Titus"), 1831 (edited and published posthumously by Christian Friedrich Kling).

== Sources ==
- Friedrich Wilhelm Bautz (1990). "Flatt, Johann Friedrich". In Bautz, Friedrich Wilhelm (ed.). Biographisch-Bibliographisches Kirchenlexikon (BBKL) (in German). Vol. 2. Hamm: Bautz. cols. 50–51. ISBN 3-88309-032-8. English translation
- Werner Raupp: Flatt, Johann Friedrich, in: The Dictionary of Eighteenth-Century German Philosophers. General Editors Heiner F. Klemme, Manfred Kuehn, Vol. 1, London/New York 2010, p. 333–334.
