= Friedrich Wilhelm Joseph Schelling =

German philosopher (1775–1854)

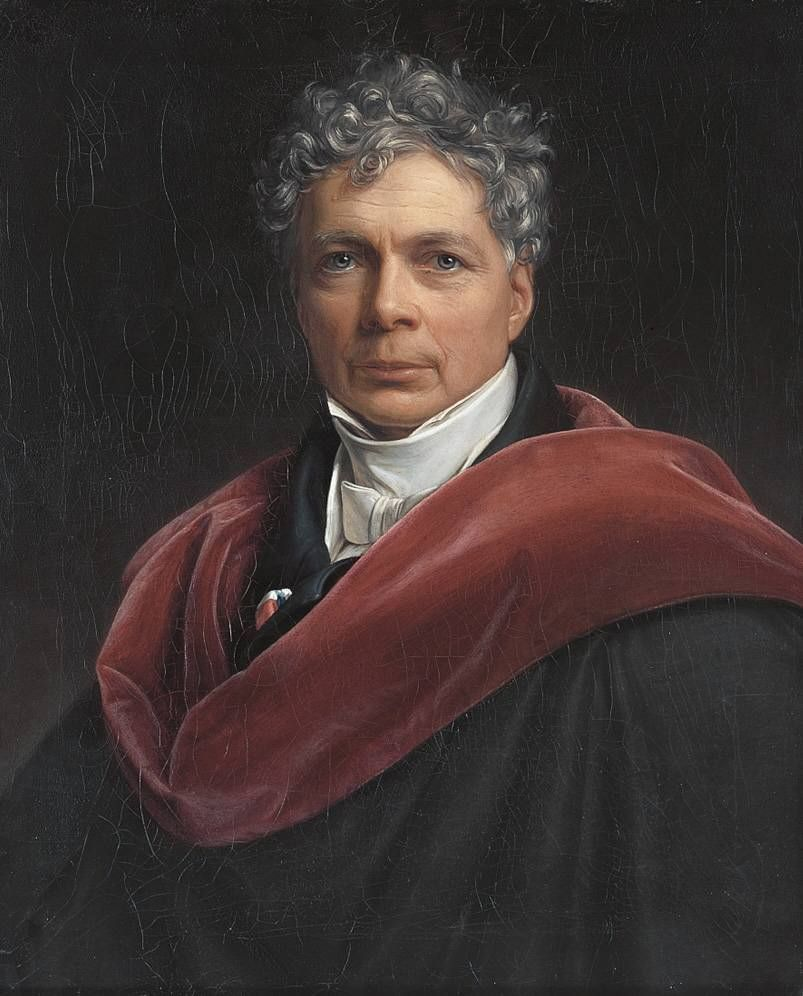
- Schelling as depicted in 1835
- Born: 27 January 1775; Leonberg, Württemberg
- Died: 20 August 1854 (aged 79); Bad Ragaz, Switzerland
- Other name: Friedrich Wilhelm Joseph von Schelling (from 1808)
- Spouse(s): Caroline Schelling (m. 1803; died 1809) Pauline Gotter (m. 1812)
- Children: 6, including Fritz, Hermann, and Paul
- Relatives: C. G. Bardili (cousin)

Education
- Education: Tübinger Stift (M.A., 1792; Lic., 1795); Leipzig University (1797; no degree)
- Thesis: De Marcione Paulinarum epistolarum emendatore (On Marcion as emendator of the Pauline letters) (1795)
- Academic advisors: I. C. Diez; J. F. Flatt; G. C. Storr

Philosophical work
- Era: 19th-century philosophy
- Region: Western philosophy
- School: German idealism Other schools: Jena Romanticism; Transcendental idealism (before 1800); Absolute idealism (after 1800)
- Institutions: University of Jena; University of Würzburg; University of Erlangen; Ludwig-Maximilians-Universität München; Friedrich Wilhelm University of Berlin
- Notable students: See list: Mikhail Bakunin; Jacob Burckhardt; Friedrich Engels; Alexander von Humboldt; Søren Kierkegaard; Karl Krause; Henry Crabb Robinson; Philip Schaff
- Main interests: Natural philosophy, aesthetics, metaphysics, epistemology, Christian philosophy
- Notable ideas: See list: Identitätsphilosophie (philosophy of identity); Naturphilosophie (combining transcendental realism and transcendental naturalism); Philosophy of chemistry; Positive Philosophie (positive philosophy); Unconscious infinity as the basic character of art

Friedrich Wilhelm Joseph Schelling (German: [ˈfʁiːdʁɪç ˈvɪlhɛlm ˈjoːzɛf ˈʃɛlɪŋ]; 27 January 1775 – 20 August 1854) was a German philosopher. Standard histories of philosophy make him the midpoint in the development of German idealism, situating him between Johann Gottlieb Fichte, his mentor in his early years, and Georg Wilhelm Friedrich Hegel, his one-time university roommate, early friend, and later rival. Interpreting Schelling's philosophy is regarded as difficult because of its evolving nature.

Schelling's thought, in the main, has been neglected, especially in the English-speaking world. An important factor in this was the ascendancy of Hegel, whose mature works portray Schelling as a mere footnote in the development of idealism. Schelling's Naturphilosophie has also been attacked by scientists for its tendency to analogize and lack of empirical orientation. However, some later philosophers have shown interest in re-examining Schelling's body of work.

== Life ==
=== Early life ===
Schelling was born in the town of Leonberg in the Duchy of Württemberg (now Baden-Württemberg), the son of the Lutheran pastor Joseph Friedrich Schelling and Gottliebin Marie Cleß. From 1783 to 1784, Schelling attended the Latin school in Nürtingen and knew Friedrich Hölderlin, who was five years his senior. Subsequently, Schelling attended the monastic school at Bebenhausen, near Tübingen, where his father was chaplain and an Orientalist professor. On 18 October 1790, at the age of 15, he was granted permission to enroll at the Tübinger Stift (seminary of the Evangelical-Lutheran Church in Württemberg), despite not having yet reached the normal enrollment age of 20. At the Stift, he shared a room with Hegel as well as Hölderlin, and the three became good friends.

Schelling studied the Church Fathers and ancient Greek philosophers. His interest gradually shifted from Lutheran theology to philosophy. In 1792, he graduated with his master's thesis, titled Antiquissimi de prima malorum humanorum origine philosophematis Genes. III. explicandi tentamen criticum et philosophicum, and in 1795 he finished his theological examination dissertation, titled De Marcione Paulinarum epistolarum emendatore (On Marcion as emendator of the Pauline letters) under Gottlob Christian Storr. Meanwhile, he had begun to study Kant and Fichte, who influenced him greatly. Representative of Schelling's early period is also a discourse between him and the philosophical writer Jacob Hermann Obereit, who was Fichte's housemate at that time, in letters and in Fichte's Journal (1796/97) on interaction, the pragmatic and Leibniz.

In 1797, while tutoring two youths of an aristocratic family, he visited Leipzig as their escort and had a chance to attend lectures at Leipzig University, where he was fascinated by contemporary physical studies including chemistry and biology. He also visited Dresden, where he saw collections of the Elector of Saxony, to which he referred later in his thinking on art. On a personal level, this Dresden visit of six weeks from August 1797 saw Schelling meet the brothers August Wilhelm Schlegel and Karl Friedrich Schlegel and his future wife Caroline (then married to August Wilhelm), and Novalis.

=== Jena period ===
After two years tutoring, in October 1798, at the age of 23, Schelling was called to University of Jena as an extraordinary professor of philosophy. His time at Jena (1798–1803) put Schelling at the centre of the intellectual ferment of Romanticism. He was on close terms with Johann Wolfgang von Goethe, who appreciated the poetic quality of the Naturphilosophie, reading Von der Weltseele. As the prime minister of the Duchy of Saxe-Weimar, Goethe invited Schelling to Jena. Schelling was nevertheless unsympathetic to the ethical idealism that animated the work of Friedrich Schiller, the other pillar of Weimar Classicism. Schelling's later Vorlesung über die Philosophie der Kunst (Lecture on the Philosophy of Art, 1802/03) closely reviewed Schiller's theory of the sublime.

In Jena, Schelling was on good terms with Fichte at first, but their different conceptions, about nature in particular, led to increasing divergence. Fichte advised him to focus on transcendental philosophy: specifically, Fichte's own Wissenschaftlehre. But Schelling, who was becoming the acknowledged leader of the Romantic school, rejected Fichte's thought as cold and abstract.

Schelling was especially close to August Wilhelm Schlegel and his wife, Caroline. Schelling grew close to Caroline's young daughter, Auguste Böhmer. Caroline began considering abandoning Schlegel to marry Schelling. Auguste died of dysentery in 1800; many blamed Schelling, who had overseen her treatment. Robert Richards, however, argues in his book The Romantic Conception of Life that Schelling's interventions were most likely irrelevant, as the doctors called to the scene assured everyone involved that Auguste's disease was inevitably fatal. Auguste's death drew Schelling and Caroline closer. Schlegel moved to Berlin, and Goethe helped Schlegel pursue a divorce. Schelling's time at Jena came to an end, and on 2 June 1803 he and Caroline were married away from Jena. Their marriage ceremony was the last occasion Schelling met his school friend the poet Friedrich Hölderlin, who was already mentally ill at that time.

In his Jena period, Schelling resumed his close relationship with Hegel. With Schelling's help, Hegel became a private lecturer (Privatdozent) at Jena University. Hegel wrote a book titled Differenz des Fichte'schen und Schelling'schen Systems der Philosophie (Difference between Fichte's and Schelling's Systems of Philosophy, 1801), and supported Schelling's position against his idealistic predecessors, Fichte and Karl Leonhard Reinhold. Beginning in January 1802, Hegel and Schelling published the Kritisches Journal der Philosophie (Critical Journal of Philosophy) as co-editors, publishing papers on the philosophy of nature, but Schelling was too busy to stay involved with the editing and the magazine was mainly Hegel's publication, espousing a thought different from Schelling's. The magazine ceased publication in the spring of 1803 when Schelling moved to Bamberg.

=== Move to Würzburg and personal conflicts ===
After Jena, Schelling went to Bamberg for a time to study the Brunonian system of medicine (the theory of John Brown) with Adalbert Friedrich Marcus and Andreas Röschlaub. From September 1803 until April 1806 Schelling was professor at the new University of Würzburg. This period was marked by considerable flux in his views and by a final breach with Fichte and Hegel.

In Würzburg, a conservative Catholic city, Schelling found many enemies among his colleagues and in the government. He moved then to Munich in 1806, where he found a position as a state official, first as associate of the Bavarian Academy of Sciences and Humanities and secretary of the Royal Academy of Fine Arts, afterwards as secretary of the Philosophische Klasse (philosophical section) of the Academy of Sciences. 1806 was also the year when Schelling published a book in which he criticized Fichte openly by name. In 1807, Schelling received the manuscript of Hegel's Phaenomenologie des Geistes (Phenomenology of the Spirit or Mind), which Hegel had sent to him, asking Schelling to write the foreword. Surprised to find critical remarks directed at his own philosophical theory, Schelling wrote back, asking Hegel to clarify whether he had intended to mock Schelling's followers who lacked a true understanding of his thought, or Schelling himself. Hegel never replied. In the same year, Schelling gave a speech about the relation between the visual arts and nature at the Academy of Fine Arts; Hegel wrote a severe criticism of it to one of his friends. After that, they criticized each other in lecture rooms and in books publicly until the end of their lives.

=== Munich period ===
Without resigning his official position in Munich, he lectured for a short time in Stuttgart (Stuttgarter Privatvorlesungen [Stuttgart private lectures], 1810), and for 7 years at the University of Erlangen (1820–1827). In 1809 Caroline died, just before he published Freiheitsschrift (Freedom Essay; original title: Philosophical Inquiries into the Essence of Human Freedom), the last book published during his life. Three years later, Schelling married one of her closest friends, Pauline Gotter, in whom he found a faithful companion.

During the long stay in Munich (1806–1841) Schelling's literary activity came gradually to a standstill. It is possible that it was the overpowering strength and influence of the Hegelian system that constrained Schelling, for it was only in 1834, after the death of Hegel, that, in a preface to a translation by Hubert Beckers of a work by Victor Cousin, he publicly expressed antagonism towards Hegelianism (and, by extension, his earlier thought). The antagonism certainly was not new; the 1822 Erlangen lectures on the history of philosophy expressed the same in a pointed fashion, and Schelling had already begun the treatment of mythology and religion which, in his view, constituted the true positive complements to the negative of logical or speculative philosophy.

=== Berlin period ===
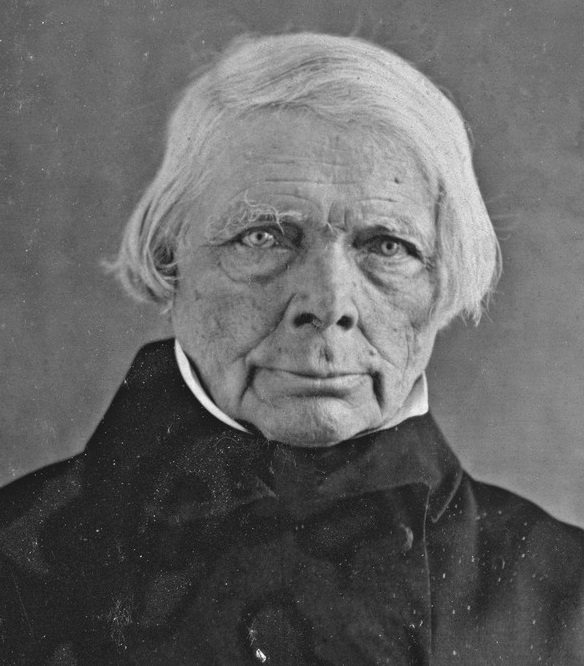
1848 daguerreotype by Hermann Biow (1804–1850)

Public attention was powerfully attracted by hints of a new system which promised something more positive, especially in its treatment of religion, than the apparent results of Hegel's teaching. The appearance of critical writings by David Friedrich Strauss, Ludwig Feuerbach, and Bruno Bauer, and the disunion in the Hegelian school itself, expressed a growing alienation from the then dominant philosophy. In Berlin, the headquarters of the Hegelians, this found expression in attempts to obtain officially from Schelling a treatment of the new system that he was understood to have in reserve. Its realization did not come about until 1841, when Schelling's appointment as Prussian privy councillor and member of the Berlin Academy gave him the right, a right he was requested to exercise, to deliver lectures at the university.

Among those in attendance at his Berlin lectures were Søren Kierkegaard (who said Schelling talked "quite insufferable nonsense" and complained that he did not end his lectures on time), Mikhail Bakunin (who called them "interesting but rather insignificant"), Henry Crabb Robinson, Henry Crabb Robinson, Jacob Burckhardt Alexander von Humboldt (who never fully accepted Schelling's natural philosophy, but admired his work), Philip Schaff, Karl Krause, and Friedrich Engels (who, as a partisan of Hegel, attended to "shield the great man's grave from abuse"). The opening lecture of his course was attended by a large and appreciative audience. The enmity of his old foe, H. E. G. Paulus, sharpened by Schelling's success, led to surreptitious publication of a verbatim report of the lectures on the philosophy of revelation. Schelling did not succeed in obtaining legal condemnation and suppression of this piracy and he stopped delivering public lectures in 1845.

== Work ==
In 1793, Schelling contributed to Heinrich Eberhard Gottlob Paulus's periodical Memorabilien. His 1795 dissertation was De Marcione Paullinarum epistolarum emendatore (On Marcion as emendator of the Pauline letters). In 1794, Schelling published an exposition of Fichte's thought entitled Ueber die Möglichkeit einer Form der Philosophie überhaupt (On the Possibility of a Form of Philosophy in General). This work was acknowledged by Fichte himself and immediately earned Schelling a reputation among philosophers. His more elaborate work, Vom Ich als Prinzip der Philosophie, oder über das Unbedingte im menschlichen Wissen (On the I as Principle of Philosophy, or on the Unconditioned in Human Knowledge, 1795), while still remaining within the limits of the Fichtean idealism, showed a tendency to give the Fichtean method a more objective application, and to amalgamate Spinoza's views with it. He contributed articles and reviews to the Philosophisches Journal of Fichte and Friedrich Immanuel Niethammer, and threw himself into the study of physical and medical science. In 1795 Schelling published Philosophische Briefe über Dogmatismus und Kritizismus (Philosophical Letters on Dogmatism and Criticism), consisting of 10 letters addressed to an unknown interlocutor that presented both a defense and critique of the Kantian system.

Between 1796/97, there was written a seminal manuscript now known as the Das älteste Systemprogramm des deutschen Idealismus ("The Oldest Systematic Program of German Idealism"). It survives in Hegel's handwriting. First published in 1916 by Franz Rosenzweig, it was attributed to Schelling. It has also been claimed that Hegel or Hölderlin was the author.

In 1797, Schelling published the essay "Neue Deduction des Naturrechts" ("New Deduction of Natural Law"), which anticipated Fichte's treatment of the topic in Grundlage des Naturrechts (Foundations of Natural Law). His studies of physical science bore fruit in Ideen zu einer Philosophie der Natur (Ideas Concerning a Philosophy of Nature, 1797), and the treatise Von der Weltseele (On the World-Soul, 1798). In Ideen Schelling referred to Leibniz and quoted from his Monadology. He held Leibniz in high regard because of his view of nature during his natural philosophy period.

In 1800, Schelling published System des transscendentalen Idealismus (System of Transcendental Idealism). In this book, Schelling described transcendental philosophy and nature philosophy as complementary to one another. Fichte reacted by stating that Schelling's argument was unsound: in Fichte's theory, nature as Not-Self (Nicht-Ich = object) could not be a subject of philosophy, whose essential content is the subjective activity of the human intellect. The breach became unrecoverable in 1801 after Schelling published "Darstellung des Systems meiner Philosophie" ("Presentation of My System of Philosophy"). Fichte thought this title absurd since, in his opinion, philosophy could not be personalized. Moreover, in this book Schelling publicly expressed his estimation of Spinoza, whose work Fichte had repudiated as dogmatism, and declared that nature and spirit differ only in their quantity, but are essentially identical. According to Schelling, the absolute was the indifference to identity, which he considered to be an essential philosophical subject.

The "Aphorismen über die Naturphilosophie" ("Aphorisms on Nature Philosophy"), published in the Jahrbücher der Medicin als Wissenschaft (1805–1808), are for the most part extracts from the Würzburg lectures, and the Denkmal der Schrift von den göttlichen Dingen des Herrn Jacobi ("Monument to the Scripture of the Divine Things of Mr. Jacobi") was a response to an attack by Jacobi (the two accused each other of atheism). A work of significance is the 1809 Philosophische Untersuchungen über das Wesen der menschlichen Freiheit und die damit zusammenhängenden Gegenstände (Philosophical Inquiries into the Essence of Human Freedom), which elaborates, with increasing mysticism, on ideas in the 1804 work Philosophie und Religion (Philosophy and Religion). However, in a change from the Jena period, evil is not an appearance coming from quantitative differences between the real and the ideal, but is something substantial. This work clearly paraphrased Kant's distinction between intelligible and empirical character. Schelling himself called freedom "a capacity for good and evil".

The 1815 essay "Ueber die Gottheiten zu Samothrake" ("On the Divinities of Samothrace") was ostensibly a part of a larger work, Weltalter ("The Ages of the World"), frequently announced as ready for publication, but of which little was ever written. Schelling planned Weltalter as a book in three parts, describing the past, present, and future of the world; however, he began only the first part, rewriting it several times and at last keeping it unpublished. The other two parts were left only in planning. Christopher John Murray describes the work as follows:

Building on the premise that philosophy cannot ultimately explain existence, he merges the earlier philosophies of Nature and identity with his newfound belief in a fundamental conflict between a dark unconscious principle and a conscious principle in God. God makes the universe intelligible by relating to the ground of the real but, insofar as nature is not complete intelligence, the real exists as a lack within the ideal and not as reflective of the ideal itself. The three universal ages – distinct only to us but not in the eternal God – therefore comprise a beginning where the principle of God before God is divine will striving for being, the present age, which is still part of this growth and hence a mediated fulfillment, and a finality where God is consciously and consummately Himself to Himself.

No authentic information on Schelling's new positive philosophy (positive Philosophie) was available until after his death at Bad Ragatz, on 20 August 1854. His sons then issued four volumes of his Berlin lectures: vol. i. Introduction to the Philosophy of Mythology (1856); ii. Philosophy of Mythology (1857); iii. and iv. Philosophy of Revelation (1858).

== Periodization ==
Schelling, at all stages of his thought, called to his aid outward forms of some other system. Fichte, Spinoza, Jakob Boehme and the mystics, and finally, major Greek thinkers with their Neoplatonic, Gnostic, and Scholastic commentators, give color to particular works. In Schelling's own view, his philosophy fell into three stages. These were:

1. Transition from Fichte's philosophy to a more objective conception of nature (an advance to Naturphilosophie)
2. Formulation of the identical, indifferent, absolute substratum of both nature and spirit (Identitätsphilosophie).
3. Opposition of negative and positive philosophy, which was the theme of his Berlin lectures, though the concepts can be traced back to 1804 (Positive Philosophie).

=== Naturphilosophie ===
The function of Schelling's Naturphilosophie is to exhibit the ideal as springing from the real. The change which experience brings before us leads to the conception of duality, the polar opposition through which nature expresses itself. The dynamic series of stages in nature are matter as the equilibrium of the fundamental expansive and contractive forces, light (with its subordinate processes of magnetism, electricity, and chemical action) and organism (with its component phases of reproduction, irritability and sensibility).

Schelling initially adopted the concept of self-organization as Kant had developed it in his Critique of Judgment for the reproduction of organisms. However, Schelling extended this concept to include the aspect of the original emergence of life as well as the emergence of new species and genera. He intended it to be a comprehensive theory of natural history that bears similarities to modern theories of self-organization.

== Reputation and influence ==
Some scholars characterize Schelling as a protean thinker who, although brilliant, jumped from one subject to another and lacked the synthesizing power needed to arrive at a complete philosophical system. Others challenge the notion that Schelling's thought is marked by profound breaks, instead arguing that his philosophy always focused on a few common themes, especially human freedom, the absolute, and the relationship between spirit and nature. Unlike Hegel, Schelling did not believe that the absolute could be known in its true character through rational inquiry alone.

Contemporary figures influenced by Schelling include Alexander von Humboldt, who referred to his work in the German introduction of his Essay on the Geography of Plants. He argues here that rational inquiry and Schelling's ideas are not "quarrelling poles" ("streitende Pole" in German) and that study of one will not harm the other. In an 1805 letter to Schelling, Humboldt describes Schelling's idea of nature as a living organism as a "revolution" in the sciences. Both men were part of Goethe's inner circle in Jena (Humboldt dedicated his Essay to him) and many of his ideas of nature were influenced by Goethe's and Schelling's philosophies.

Schelling is still studied, although his reputation has varied over time. His work impressed the English Romantic poet and critic Samuel Taylor Coleridge, who introduced his ideas into English-speaking culture, sometimes without full acknowledgment, as in the Biographia Literaria. Coleridge's critical work was influential, and it was he who introduced into English literature Schelling's concept of the unconscious. Schelling's System of Transcendental Idealism has been seen as a precursor of Sigmund Freud's Interpretation of Dreams (1899).

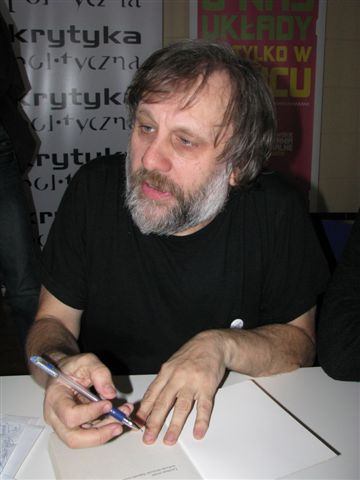
Slavoj Žižek is one example of contemporary philosophers influenced by Schelling's philosophy.

The Catholic Tübingen school, a group of Roman Catholic theologians at the University of Tübingen in the nineteenth century, was greatly influenced by Schelling and attempted to reconcile his philosophy of revelation with Catholic theology.

Up to 1950, Schelling was almost a forgotten philosopher even in Germany. In the 1910s and 1920s, philosophers of neo-Kantianism and neo-Hegelianism, like Wilhelm Windelband or Richard Kroner, tended to describe Schelling as an episode connecting Fichte and Hegel. His late period tended to be ignored, and his philosophies of nature and of art in the 1790s and the first decade of the 19th century were the main focus. In this context Kuno Fischer characterized Schelling's early philosophy as "aesthetic idealism", focusing on the argument where he ranked art as "the sole document and the eternal organ of philosophy" (das einzige wahre und ewige Organon zugleich und Dokument der Philosophie). From socialist philosophers like György Lukács, he was regarded as anachronistic. Martin Heidegger, during the period when he was involved with the Nazi Party, found in Schelling's On Human Freedom central themes of Western ontology – being, existence, and freedom – and expounded on them in his 1936 lectures.

In the 1950s, the situation began to change. In 1954, the centennial of his death, an international conference on Schelling was held. Several philosophers, including Karl Jaspers, gave presentations about the uniqueness and relevance of his thought, with interest shifting toward his later work on the origin of existence. Schelling was the subject of Jürgen Habermas's 1954 dissertation.

In 1955, Jaspers published Schelling, representing him as a forerunner of the existentialists and Walter Schulz, one of the organizers of the 1954 conference, published "Die Vollendung des Deutschen Idealismus in der Spätphilosophie Schellings" ("The Perfection of German Idealism in Schelling's Late Philosophy"), claiming that Schelling had made German idealism complete with his late philosophy, particularly with his Berlin lectures in the 1840s. Schulz presented Schelling as the person who resolved the philosophical problems which Hegel had left incomplete, in contrast to the contemporary idea that Schelling had been surpassed by Hegel much earlier. Theologian Paul Tillich wrote: "what I learned from Schelling became determinative of my own philosophical and theological development". Maurice Merleau-Ponty likened his own project of natural ontology to Schelling's in his 1957–58 Course on Nature.

In the 1970s, nature was again of interest to philosophers in relation to environmental issues. Schelling's philosophy of nature, particularly his intention to construct a program which covers both nature and the intellectual life in a single system and method, and to restore nature as a central theme of philosophy, has been reevaluated in the contemporary context. His influence and relation to the German art scene, particularly to Romantic literature and visual art, have been of interest since the late 1960s, from Philipp Otto Runge to Gerhard Richter and Joseph Beuys. This interest has been revived in recent years through the work of the environmental philosopher Arran Gare, who has identified a tradition of Schellingian science overcoming the opposition between science and the humanities, and offering the basis for an understanding of ecological science and ecological philosophy.

In relation to psychology, Schelling was considered to have coined the term "unconsciousness". Slavoj Žižek has written two books attempting to integrate Schelling's philosophy, mainly his middle period works including Weltalter, with work of Jacques Lacan. Psychoanalytic theorist Rafael Holmberg has argued that an important similarity between Schelling and psychoanalysis is their retroactive interpretations of temporality and freedom. The opposition and division in God and the problem of evil in God examined by the later Schelling influenced Luigi Pareyson's thought.

== Quotations ==
- "Nature is visible spirit, spirit is invisible nature." ["Natur ist hiernach der sichtbare Geist, Geist die unsichtbare Natur"] (Ideen, "Introduction")
- "History as a whole is a progressive, gradually self-disclosing revelation of the Absolute." (System of Transcendental Idealism, 1800)
- "Now if the appearance of freedom is necessarily infinite, the total evolution of the Absolute is also an infinite process, and history itself a never wholly completed revelation of that Absolute which, for the sake of consciousness, and thus merely for the sake of appearance, separates itself into conscious and unconscious, the free and the intuitant; but which itself, however, in the inaccessible light wherein it dwells, is Eternal Identity and the everlasting ground of harmony between the two." (System of Transcendental Idealism, 1800)
- "Has creation a final goal? And if so, why was it not reached at once? Why was the consummation not realized from the beginning? To these questions there is but one answer: Because God is Life, and not merely Being." (Philosophical Inquiries into the Nature of Human Freedom, 1809)
- "Only he who has tasted freedom can feel the desire to make over everything in its image, to spread it throughout the whole universe." (Philosophical Inquiries into the Nature of Human Freedom, 1809)
- "As there is nothing before or outside of God he must contain within himself the ground of his existence. All philosophies say this, but they speak of this ground as a mere concept without making it something real and actual." (Philosophical Inquiries into the Nature of Human Freedom, 1809)
- "[The Godhead] is not divine nature or substance, but the devouring ferocity of purity that a person is able to approach only with an equal purity. Since all Being goes up in it as if in flames, it is necessarily unapproachable to anyone still embroiled in Being." (The Ages of the World, c. 1815)
- "God then has no beginning only insofar as there is no beginning of his beginning. The beginning in God is eternal beginning, that is, such a one as was beginning from all eternity, and still is, and also never ceases to be beginning." (Quoted in Hartshorne & Reese, Philosophers Speak of God, Chicago: U of Chicago P, 1953, p. 237.)

== Bibliography ==
Selected works are listed below.

- Ueber Mythen, historische Sagen und Philosopheme der ältesten Welt (On Myths, Historical Legends and Philosophical Themes of Earliest Antiquity, 1793)
1. Ueber die Möglichkeit einer Form der Philosophie überhaupt (On the Possibility of an Absolute Form of Philosophy, 1794),
2. Vom Ich als Prinzip der Philosophie oder über das Unbedingte im menschlichen Wissen (Of the I as the Principle of Philosophy or on the Unconditional in Human Knowledge, 1795), and
3. Philosophische Briefe über Dogmatismus und Kriticismus (Philosophical Letters on Dogmatism and Criticism, 1795).
- 1, 2, 3 in The Unconditional in Human Knowledge: Four Early Essays 1794–6, translation and commentary by F. Marti, Lewisburg: Bucknell University Press (1980).
- De Marcione Paulinarum epistolarum emendatore (1795).
- Abhandlung zur Erläuterung des Idealismus der Wissenschaftslehre (1796). Translated as Treatise Explicatory of the Idealism in the 'Science of Knowledge' in Thomas Pfau, Idealism and the Endgame of Theory, Albany: SUNY Press (1994).
- Ideen zu einer Philosophie der Natur als Einleitung in das Studium dieser Wissenschaft (1797) as Ideas for a Philosophy of Nature: As Introduction to the Study of this Science, translated by E. E. Harris and P. Heath, introduction R. Stern, Cambridge: Cambridge University Press (1988).
- Von der Weltseele (1798), as On the World Soul, edited by Timothy W. Wright, Khem Publishing (2025).
- Erster Entwurf eines Systems der Naturphilosophie (1799), as First Plan of a System of the Philosophy of Nature, translated by Keith R. Peterson, Albany, NY: SUNY Press (2004).
- System des transscendentalen Idealismus (1800) as System of Transcendental Idealism, translated by P. Heath, introduction M. Vater, Charlottesville: University Press of Virginia (1978).
- Ueber den wahren Begriff der Naturphilosophie und die richtige Art ihre Probleme aufzulösen (1801).
- "Darstellung des Systems meiner Philosophie" (1801), also known as "Darstellung meines Systems der Philosophie", as "Presentation of My System of Philosophy," translated by M. Vater, The Philosophical Forum, 32(4), Winter 2001, pp. 339–371.
- Bruno oder über das göttliche und natürliche Prinzip der Dinge (1802) as Bruno, or On the Natural and the Divine Principle of Things, translated with an introduction by M. Vater, Albany: State University of New York Press (1984).
- On the Relationship of the Philosophy of Nature to Philosophy in General (1802). Translated by George di Giovanni and H.S. Harris in Between Kant and Hegel, Albany: SUNY Press (1985).
- Philosophie der Kunst (lecture) (delivered 1802–3; published 1859) as The Philosophy of Art (1989) Minnesota: Minnesota University Press.
- Vorlesungen über die Methode des akademischen Studiums (delivered 1802; published 1803) as On University Studies, translated by E. S. Morgan, edited by N. Guterman, Athens, Ohio: Ohio University Press (1966).
- Ideas on a Philosophy of Nature as an Introduction to the Study of This Science (Second edition, 1803). Translated by Priscilla Hayden-Roy in Philosophy of German Idealism, New York: Continuum (1987).
- System der gesamten Philosophie und der Naturphilosophie insbesondere (Nachlass) (1804). Translated as System of Philosophy in General and of the Philosophy of Nature in Particular in Thomas Pfau, Idealism and the Endgame of Theory, Albany: SUNY Press (1994).
- Philosophische Untersuchungen über das Wesen der menschlichen Freiheit und die damit zusammenhängenden Gegenstände (1809) as Of Human Freedom, a translation with critical introduction and notes by J. Gutmann, Chicago: Open Court (1936); also as Philosophical Investigations into the Essence of Human Freedom, trans. Jeff Love and Johannes Schmidt, SUNY Press (2006).
- Clara. Oder über den Zusammenhang der Natur- mit der Geisterwelt (Nachlass) (1810) as Clara: or on Nature's Connection to the Spirit World trans. Fiona Steinkamp, Albany: State University of New York Press, 2002.
- Stuttgart Seminars (1810), translated by Thomas Pfau in Idealism and the Endgame of Theory, Albany: SUNY Press (1994).
- Weltalter (1811–15) as The Ages of the World, translated with introduction and notes by F. de W. Bolman, jr., New York: Columbia University Press (1967); also in The Abyss of Freedom/Ages of the World, trans. Judith Norman, with an essay by Slavoj Žižek, Ann Arbor: The University of Michigan Press (1997).
- "Ueber die Gottheiten von Samothrake" (1815) as Schelling's Treatise on 'The Deities of Samothrace', a translation and introduction by R. F. Brown, Missoula, Mont.: Scholars Press (1977).
- Darstellung des philosophischen Empirismus (Nachlass) (1830).
- Philosophie der Mythologie (lecture) (1842).
- Philosophie der Offenbarung (lecture) (1854).
- Zur Geschichte der neueren Philosophie (probably 1833–4) as On the History of Modern Philosophy, translation and introduction by A. Bowie, Cambridge: Cambridge University Press (1994).

Collected works in German

AA	Historisch-kritische Schelling-Ausgabe der Bayerischen Akademie der Wissenschaften. Edited by Hans Michael Baumgartner, Wilhelm G. Jacobs, Jörg Jantzen, Hermann Krings and Hermann Zeltner, Stuttgart-Bad Cannstatt: Frommann-Holzboog, 1976 ff.
SW	Friedrich Wilhelm Joseph von Schellings sämtliche Werke. Edited by K. F. A. Schelling. 1st division (Abteilung): 10 vols. (= I–X); 2nd division: 4 vols. (= XI–XIV), Stuttgart/Augsburg 1856–1861. The original edition in new arrangement edited by M. Schröter, 6 main volumes (Hauptbände), 6 supplementary volumes (Ergänzungsbände), Munich, 1927 ff., 2nd edition 1958 ff.

== See also ==
- History of aesthetics before the 20th century
- Objective idealism
- Perennial philosophy
- Romanticism in science
