= Friedrich Immanuel Niethammer =

German philosopher and theologian

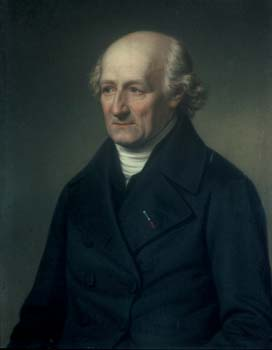
- Born: Friedrich Philipp Immanuel Niethammer; 6 March 1766; Beilstein, Duchy of Württemberg, Holy Roman Empire
- Died: 1 April 1848 (aged 82); Munich, Kingdom of Bavaria, German Confederation

Education
- Education: Tübinger Stift; University of Jena
- Thesis: De vero revelationis fundamento (1792)
- Academic advisor: Karl Leonhard Reinhold

Philosophical work
- Era: 19th-century philosophy
- Region: Western philosophy
- School: German idealism
- Institutions: University of Jena (1793–1803); University of Würzburg (1803–1806)
- Main interests: Philosophy of education, philosophy of religion
- Notable ideas: Humanism as an educational ideal

Friedrich Philipp Immanuel Niethammer (6 March 1766 – 1 April 1848), later Ritter von Niethammer, was a German Lutheran theologian, philosopher and educational reformer.

== Biography ==
Immanuel Niethammer received instruction at the Maulbronn monastery, and in 1784 became a student at Tübinger Stift, where he met Friedrich Hölderlin (1770–1843), Georg Wilhelm Friedrich Hegel (1770–1831) and Friedrich Wilhelm Joseph Schelling (1775–1854). In 1790 he moved to Jena, where he studied Kantian philosophy under Karl Leonhard Reinhold (1757–1823). Subsequently, he became an associate professor of philosophy at the University of Jena, where he remained until 1804. In 1806, he was Protestant Oberschulkommissar (upper school administrator) of Franconia, and the next year, he became Central Commissioner of Education and a member of the Protestant General Consistory of Bavaria.

In 1797, with Johann Gottlieb Fichte (1762–1814), Niethammer was co-editor of the Philosophische Journal. In 1798, the journal published Friedrich Karl Forberg's Entwicklung des Begriffs der Religion ("Development of the Concept of Religion"), an essay that Fichte prefaced with Über den Grund unsers Glaubens an eine göttliche Weltregierung ("Grounds of Our Belief in a Divine Government of the Universe"). Reaction to the article included accusations of atheism, sparking the so-called 1798–99 Atheismusstreit (atheism dispute), an event that eventually led to Fichte's 1799 departure from Jena.

In 1808, Niethammer published Der Streit des Philanthropinismus und des Humanismus in der Theorie des Erziehungs-Unterrichts unsrer Zeit ("The Dispute between Philanthropinism and Humanism in the Educational Theory of our Time"), a book that was a reaction to philanthropinism, an educational concept that was developed during the Age of Enlightenment. Philanthropinism valued practical and physical education and largely rejected rote-learning of the classics. Niethammer agreed with the philanthropinists in that a measure of autonomy was important in education, but he found their teaching philosophy too extreme. He believed that a sense of civics and civility were vital in a child's education, and made efforts to combine the best of philanthropinism with the best of "humanism", a word that he derived from Cicero's "humanitas".

== Selected works ==
- Ueber den Versuch einer Kritik aller Offenbarung; eine philosophische Abhandlung, 1792.
- Über Religion als Wissenschaft zur Bestimmung des Inhalts der Religionen und der Behandlungsart ihrer Urkunden, 1795
- Der Herausgeber des Philosophischen Journals gerichtliche Verantwortungsschriften : gegen die Anklage des Atheismus, (1799, Fichte's reply to the charge of atheism).
- Der Streit des Philanthropinismus und Humanismus in der Theorie des Erziehungs-Unterrichts unsrer Zeit, 1808.
