= Sexual fantasy =

Class of mental image or pattern of thought

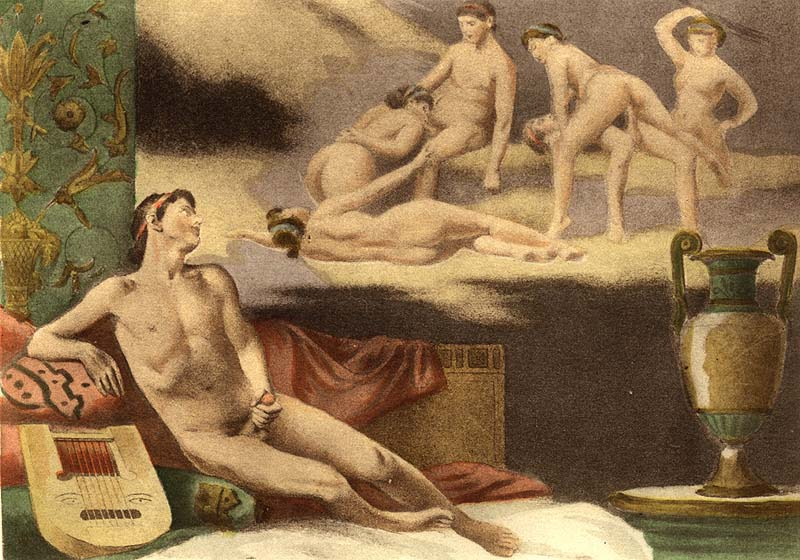
One of the illustrations to De Figuris Veneris by Édouard-Henri Avril, portraying a man masturbating while sexually fantasizing

A sexual fantasy, or erotic fantasy, is an autoerotic mental image or pattern of thought that stirs a person's sexuality and can create or enhance sexual arousal. A sexual fantasy can be created by the person's imagination or memory, and may be triggered autonomously or by external stimulation such as erotic literature or pornography, a physical object, or sexual attraction to another person. Anything that may give rise to sexual arousal may also produce a sexual fantasy, and sexual arousal may in turn give rise to fantasies.

Sexual fantasies are nearly universal, being reported in many societies across the globe. However, because of the nature of some fantasies, the actual putting of such fantasies into action is far less common, due to cultural, social, moral, and religious constraints. In some cases, even a discussion by a person of sexual fantasies is subject to social taboos and inhibitions. Some people find it convenient to act out fantasies through sexual roleplay.

A fantasy may be a positive or negative experience, or even both. It may be in response to a past experience and can influence future sexual behavior. A person may not wish to enact a sexual fantasy in real life, and since the process is entirely imaginary, they are not limited to acceptable or practical fantasies, which can provide information on the psychological processes behind sexual behavior.

== In art ==
Sexual fantasy can also pertain to a genre of literature, film or work of art. Such works may be appreciated for their aesthetics, though many people may feel uncomfortable with such works. For example, women in prison films may be described as sexual fantasies.

A person may find validation of a sexual fantasy by viewing the depiction or discussion of a sexual fantasy in film, usually of a pornographic nature. In the case of films, the term may describe a part of the film, such as a fantasy scene or sequence.

Besides pornographic films, a number of mainstream films have included sexual fantasy scenes, such as Business Is Business (1971), Amarcord (1973), American Beauty (1999) and others. In many cases, the use of fantasy scenes enables the inclusion of material into a work indicating the sexualized mental state of a character.

== Methodology ==
It is difficult to objectively identify and measure the nature of sexual fantasies, so that many studies deal with conscious fantasies when a person is awake, using one of three techniques:

- anonymous respondents are provided with a checklist of fantasies and asking them to indicate which ones they have experienced, how often, and in what context. This method relies on retrospective recall, which may limit its accuracy. A checklist may not be comprehensive, and as a result may be biased towards some fantasies.
- anonymous respondents are asked to write, in narrative form, their sexual fantasies. This method also relies on retrospective recall. Some studies limit the number of fantasies entered (such as only the most frequent ones), and respondents may not write down all of their fantasies anyway—they may forget infrequent fantasies, not want to write too many down, or be more subject to social desirability bias than with a checklist.
- respondents record the fantasies they experience over a given period of time using checklists or diaries. This method requires a long period of time to be representative, and may be impractical.

To measure the reliability of a person's reporting of fantasies, researchers may compare a person's reported sexual arousal against actual measures of arousal, using techniques such as vaginal photoplethysmography, penile strain gauges, or other tools, such as genital pulse amplitude, genital blood volume, and heart rate. A 1977 study found that males judged arousal based on blood volume far better than females, and that males and females were equal when judging arousal based on pulse amplitude measures. Additionally, females were better at judging low arousal.

As with studies of sex in general, samples used in studies may be too small, not be fully random, or not fully representative of a population. This makes similarities between studies especially important. Women may be prone to underreporting the frequency of fantasy because they do not realize that they are becoming aroused, or they will not say that they are; one common problem is that they will imagine romantic imagery and become aroused, but not report the fantasy because it is not sexually explicit.

Many studies are modern and are carried out in Western society, which, through factors like gender roles and taboo, are not widely representative, raising the need for more studies in different societies and historical eras. With regards to age, there is very little knowledge of sexual fantasies in children aged 5 to 12, and there is a need for longitudinal studies across a life span. Sex is often a taboo topic, so conducting a truly honest and representative example can be difficult in some areas. For example, a 1997 study on South Asian gay men found that almost 75% were afraid of being "found out", which complicates studies.

== Purposes ==
The scenarios for sexual fantasies vary greatly between individuals and are influenced by personal desires and experiences, and can range from the mundane to the bizarre. Fantasies are frequently used to escape real-life sexual restraints by imagining dangerous or illegal scenarios, such as rape, castration, or kidnapping. They allow people to imagine themselves in roles they do not normally have, such as power, innocence and guilt. Fantasies have enormous influence over sexual behavior and can be the sole cause of an orgasm. While there are several common themes in fantasies, any object or act can be eroticized.

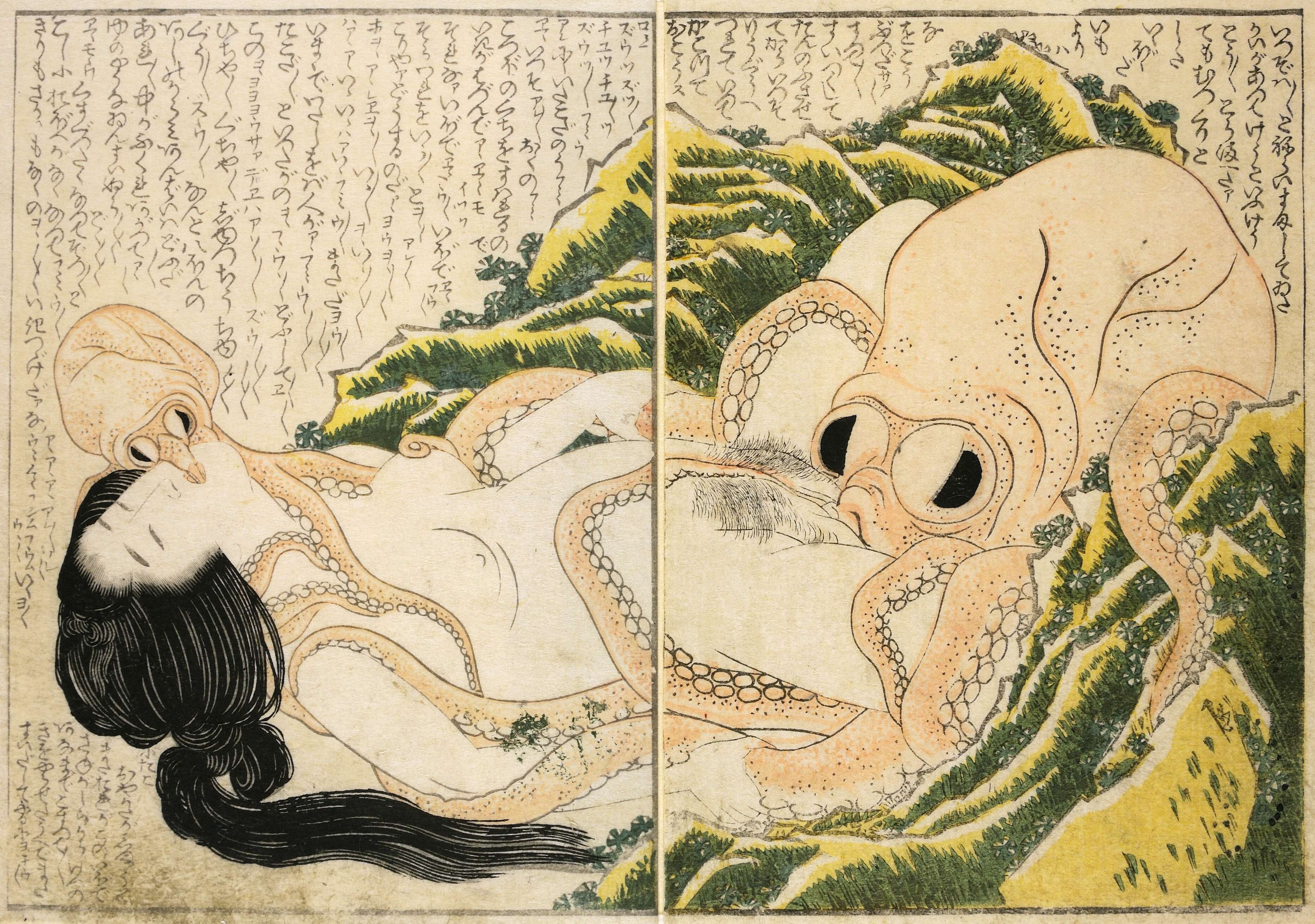
The Dream of the Fisherman's Wife by Hokusai is an artistic depiction of a sexual fantasy.

Sexual fantasies are increasingly viewed as a necessary component to a healthy relationship. Accordingly, theorists have argued that fantasies may be used to encourage and promote sexual pleasure between partners. Researchers have additionally found a positive correlation between instances of sexual fantasizing and increased orgasm, arousal, and general contentment.

The relative benefits of sexual fantasies are summarized in a statement by Stroller; "sexual fantasies are a private pornography in which we rehearse over and over again needs that are nearly impossible to fulfil in actual sex". Sexual fantasizing therefore allows an individual to fulfil desires that cannot be realistically achieved. In this sense, researchers assert that fantasizing about extra-marital, or multiple-partner sex is positively correlated with long-term partnerships. As such, sexual fantasies are viewed as means to combat sexual dissatisfaction.

Sexual fantasising may also be used to settle relational hardships, as opposed to sexual dissatisfaction. For instance, women from disturbed marriages were found to fantasise significantly more often than happily married women. Creating hypothetical scenarios may be used as a coping mechanism, particularly by women, in handling stress and discomfort. As such, fantasies allow individuals to enter a new realm (e.g. experience a position of power, innocence, or guilt) that contrasts the source of anguish, and enhances feelings of self-worth.

The purpose and function of sexual fantasies are explained rather differently from an evolutionary perspective. Bowlby's (1969/1982) attachment theory asserts that the absence of adequate attachment figures can devastate self-esteem. It is suggested that more anxiously attached individuals use sex to attain emotional security. Accordingly, they might engage in sex through a longing for sexual intimacy, and increase the frequency of sexual behavior under conditions that challenge the status of their relationship.

Contrastingly, the avoidant attachment type is apprehensive about the intimacy posed by sexual relations, and will take active measures to avoid feelings of closeness. Patterns of sexual behavior include emotion free sex with casual partners, engaging in sex to promote oneself, and feelings of detachment during intercourse. Sexual fantasies are likely to follow attachment-related themes. It is noted that anxious attachment individuals report significantly more instances of sexual fantasizing, and portray the self as feeble, dependable and powerless. Avoidant attachment types report fantasies in which relationships are regarded as cold, unfeeling and impersonal. As such, sexual fantasies serve the primary function of fulfilling interpersonal goals through the mode of mental representation.

Evolutionary theory provides another interesting explanation as to the purpose and function of gender differences in sexual fantasies. Research literature states that women are more likely to prioritize their own physical and emotional sensations, where men conjure images of sexual partners. Women are also more likely to fantasize about a single individual with whom they have shared history, or those whom they wish to pursue a long-term relationship. Throughout the course of time, it has proved advantageous for the male to copulate with young and fertile females. They evolved an ability to decipher "fresh features" of reproductive partners; clear skin, thick hair, fuller lips, and so forth.

By comparison, females are driven to reproduce on the basis of parental investment, and a quality gene pool possessed by the male. From a female perspective, the risks of copulating with multiple male partners far outweigh any potential benefits. It is therefore unsurprising that males visualize specific physical features; its origins and purpose can be found in evolution. It also follows that where males project outwardly, viewing women as a means to obtain sexual pleasure, women have become conditioned to remain passive in this role. They do so under close scrutiny of male sexual attention, to fantasize a specific and special partner.

A person may have no desire to carry out a fantasy; people often use fantasies to help plan out future sexual encounters. Fantasies occur in all individuals and at any time of the day, although it has been suggested that they are more common among frequent daydreamers. Sexual fantasy is frequent during masturbation, although this may be truer for men than for women. (Note: Leitenberg and Henning charted multiple studies of men and women who fantasized during masturbation. More than half found that at least 80% of men claimed to have had fantasies during masturbation, and at least 67% of women reported the same.)

During sexual contact, some people can use their fantasies to "turn off" undesirable aspects of an act. Conversely, a person may use fantasy to focus and maintain arousal, such as a man receiving fellatio ignoring a distraction. Men tend to be aware of only parts of themselves during sex—they are more likely to focus on the physical stimulation of one area, and as such, do not see themselves as a "whole".

Many couples share their fantasies to feel closer and gain more intimacy and trust, or simply to become more aroused or effect a more powerful physical response. Some couples share fantasies as a form of outercourse; this has been offered as an explanation for the rise of BDSM during the 1980s — in order to avoid contracting HIV, people turned to BDSM as a safe outlet for sexual fantasy. Couples may also act out their fantasies through sexual roleplay.

Fantasies may also be used as a part of sex therapy. They can enhance insufficiently exciting sexual acts to promote higher levels of sexual arousal and release. A 1986 study that looked at married women indicated that sexual fantasies helped them achieve arousal and orgasm. As a part of therapy, anorgasmic women are commonly encouraged to use fantasy and masturbation.

== Common fantasies ==
The incidence of sexual fantasies is nearly universal, but vary by gender, age, sexual orientation, and society. However, because of a reliance on retrospective recall, as well as response bias and taboo, there is an inherent difficulty in measuring the frequency of types of fantasies.

In general, the most common fantasies for men and women are: reliving an exciting sexual experience, imagining sex with a current partner, and imagining sex with a different partner. There is no consistent difference in the popularity of these three categories of fantasies. The next most common fantasies involve oral sex, sex in a romantic location, sexual power or irresistibility, and rape.

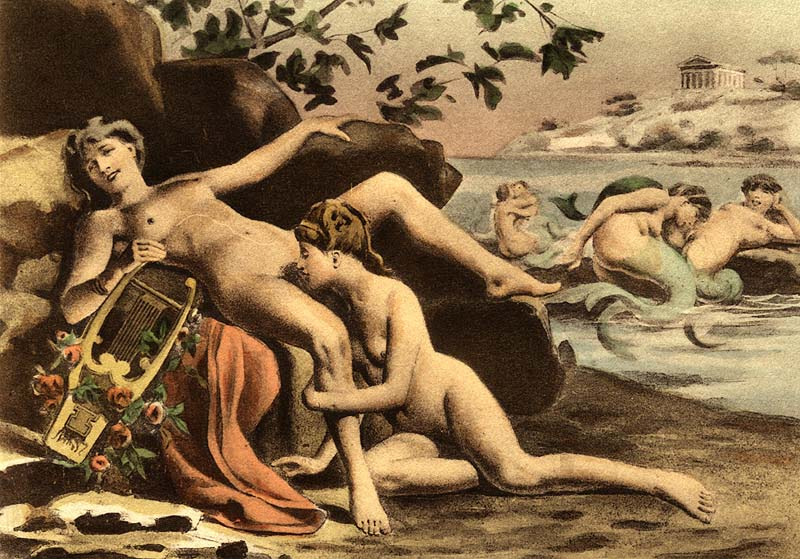
Oral sex is one of the most common fantasies among men and women

Fantasy	Carried it out (%)	Fantasized about it (%)
Infidelity	16	30
Threesome	14	21
Sex at work	12	10

According to a 2004 United States survey, the incidence of certain fantasies is higher than the actual performance.

== Gender differences ==
=== Origins of sexual fantasies ===
The sexes have been found to contrast with respect to where their fantasies originate from. Men tend to fantasize about past sexual experiences, whereas women are more likely to conjure an imaginary lover or sexual encounter that they have not experienced previously.

Male fantasies tend to focus more on visual imagery and explicit anatomic detail, with men being more interested in visual sexual stimulation and fantasies about casual sex encounters, regardless of sexual orientation.

On the other hand, women's fantasies tend to be more focused upon mental sexual stimulation and contain more emotion and connection. Thus, women are more likely to report romantic sexual fantasies that are high in intimacy and affection, for instance associating their male partner with heroism and viewing them as chivalric rescuers.

Evolutionary theory offers an explanation for this finding, such that women may be likely to show commitment to their male partner in return for his investment of resources to help raise her offspring, thus increasing offspring chance of survival.

=== Types of sexual fantasies ===
Much research has been conducted which has highlighted several gender differences in sexual fantasies. Some of the patterns which have frequently emerged include men's greater tendency to report sexual fantasies falling in the following categories: exploratory, intimate, impersonal, and sadomasochism.

Exploratory fantasies include those of homosexual encounters and group sex, whilst fantasies of watching others engage in sexual intercourse and fetishism are classed as impersonal sexual fantasies. Women are also likely to report fantasies involving the same-sex partner, or those with a famous person, although both sexes have been found to prefer intimate fantasies over the other three types outlined, including fantasies of oral sex and sex outdoors.

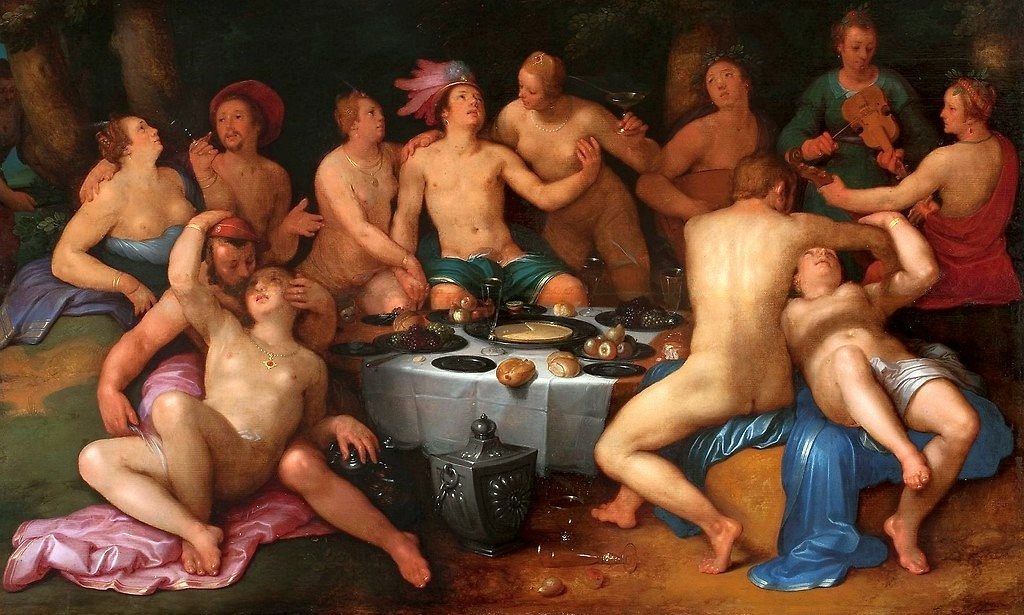
An artistic depiction of group sex; a sexual fantasy found to be more common in males.

=== Frequent themes ===
Another way the sexes differ is that men are much more likely to fantasize about having multiple sexual partners (i.e., having threesomes or orgies) compared to women and seek greater partner variation in their sexual fantasies. Evolutionary theory suggests that this may be due to men's capacity to produce many offspring at any one time by impregnating multiple females, and thus predicts that males will be much more open to the concept of multiple partnerships in order to increase reproductive success and continue their genetic line.

The sexes also differ in terms of how much they fantasize about dominance and submission. Men fantasize about dominance much more frequently than submission, whereas women fantasize about submission much more frequently than dominance. Despite these differences, most individuals do not conform to these gendered sexual stereotypes, and that male sexuality is not innately aggressive, nor is female sexuality inherently passive, and that these stereotypes may decline with age.

Sexual fantasies may instead vary as a result of individual differences, such as personality or learning experiences, and not gender per se. Indeed, it has been suggested that gender differences in sexual fantasies have actually narrowed over time, and may continue to do so, for example with regard to variety of sexual fantasy and the amount of fantasizing reported by each of the sexes.

Table 2. Proportion of sexual fantasies experienced, divided by gender.
Percentage of Fantasy (%)
	Men	Women
Group sex	42	16
Famous person	16	27
Homosexuality	10	19
Stranger	33	39

=== Age ===
The age of first experiencing a sexual fantasy has also been found to differ between the sexes. Males are likely to report this at a younger age, typically between the years of 11 and 13, and describe these as being more explicit in content. Themes that were common to both genders regarding first sexual fantasies included sex with celebrities (such as movie stars), and also teachers. It has been noted that sexual fantasy preferences of the two genders also change as a function of age.

For instance, younger men have been found to endorse more fantasies with multiple partners, a trend which declines with age, whilst homosexual fantasies increase slightly. Meanwhile, for women, fantasies with strangers and same-sex partners remain relatively stable across their lifetime.

=== Paraphilic sexual fantasies ===
Sex differences have also been found with regard to paraphilic fantasies (i.e. those which are considered to be atypical). Examples of paraphilic sexual fantasies include incest, voyeurism, transvestic fetishism, sex with animals (see zoophilia), and pedophilia.

One study reported that over 60% of men admitted to a sexual fantasy involving intercourse with an underage partner, and 33% of males reported rape fantasies. Along with other sexual fantasies, it is thought that the age of occurrence for paraphilic sexual fantasies is usually before 18 years, although this has been found to vary according to the specific fantasy at hand.

Table 3. Types of paraphilic fantasies and age of occurrence.
	Age of onset (years: months)
Transvestism	13:6
Fetishism	16:0
Voyeurism	17:4
Non-incestuous heterosexual paedophilia	21:1
Non-incestuous homosexual paedophilia	18:2

Unusual sexual fantasies are more common in men, with fantasies of urinating on their sexual partner and being urinated on being significantly higher among males. The Diagnostic and Statistical Manual of Mental Disorders Fourth Edition (DSM-IV) states that paraphilias are rarely diagnosed in women, with the exception of sexual masochism.

Furthermore, sexual arousal has been found to be greater in men than in women when asked to entertain the thought of engaging in paraphilic sexual activity. It may, however, be the case that paraphilias are reported less often in women because they are under-researched in women. Paraphilic sexual fantasies in females include sexual sadism, exhibitionism, and pedophilia.

=== Execution of sexual fantasies ===
Sexual fantasies may be more likely to be executed in contemporary society due to more liberalized attitudes towards the previously taboo topic of sex, and increased awareness of the variety of sexual experiences that now exist. Women are more likely to act upon their sexual fantasies than men since it has been suggested that they fantasize about sexual activities within their range of experience, which therefore makes them more possible to act out.

The link between sexual fantasies involving dominance (e.g. rape fantasies) and likelihood of displaying aggressive behavior in real life has been investigated, with connections being found in relation to sexual crimes committed by men and fantasies of sexual coercion. This may be especially more likely if the individual displays high levels of psychopathic traits.

=== Theoretical frameworks ===
Since numerous variables influence sexual fantasy, the differences between gender can be examined through multiple theoretical frameworks. Social constructionism predicts that sexual socialisation is a strong predictor of sexual fantasy and that gender differences are the result of social influences. From this perspective, it is believed that female sexuality is more malleable since it is influenced to a greater extent by cultural views and expectations regarding how women should think and behave.

In contrast, evolutionary theory (also known as evolutionary psychology or sociobiology) predicts that sexual fantasy is predisposed to biological factors. For example, some studies have found that women prefer fantasizing about familiar lovers, whereas male sexual fantasies involve anonymous partners.

A social constructionist explanation may say that this is because women are raised to be chaste and selective with men, whereas evolutionary theory may state that ancestral women preferred the reproductive security of having one partner, such that being faithful to him will result in a greater likelihood of him investing resources in her and her offspring, an idea which is still ingrained in modern women today.

Evolutionary psychology can also help to shed light on the finding that females have a higher proportion of sexual fantasies involving a male celebrity. The theory suggests that this mating strategy may have been advantageous for our female ancestors, such that affiliation with a high status male increases offspring survival rate via protection and provision.

== Sexual orientation ==
In 1979, Masters and Johnson carried out one of the first studies on sexual fantasy in homosexual men and women, though their data-collection method is unclear. Their sample consisted of 30 gay men and lesbians, and they found that the five most common fantasies for homosexual men were images of sexual anatomy (primarily the penis and buttocks), forced sexual encounters, an idyllic setting for sex, group sex, and sex with women. A 1985 study found that homosexual men preferred unspecified sexual activity with other men, oral sex, and sex with another man not previously involved. In both studies, homosexual and heterosexual men shared similar fantasies, but with genders switched.

A 2006 non-representative study looked at homosexual men in India. It found that when compared to heterosexual male fantasies, homosexual males were more focused on exploratory, intimate, and impersonal fantasies. There were no differences in sadomasochistic fantasies. In general, there was little difference in the top fantasies of homosexual versus heterosexual males. At the time of the study, homosexuality was illegal.

A 2005 study compared heterosexual and homosexual women in the Los Angeles metropolitan area and found some differences in the content of their fantasies. In gender-specific findings, homosexual women had more fantasies about specific parts of a woman (face, breasts, clitoris, vagina, buttocks, arms or hair), while heterosexual women had more fantasies about specific parts of a man's body (face, penis, buttocks, arms or hair). Homosexual women also had more fantasies of "delighting many women"; there was no significant difference when subjects were asked if they fantasized about delighting many men. There was no significant difference in responses to questions that were not gender-specific.

== Force ==
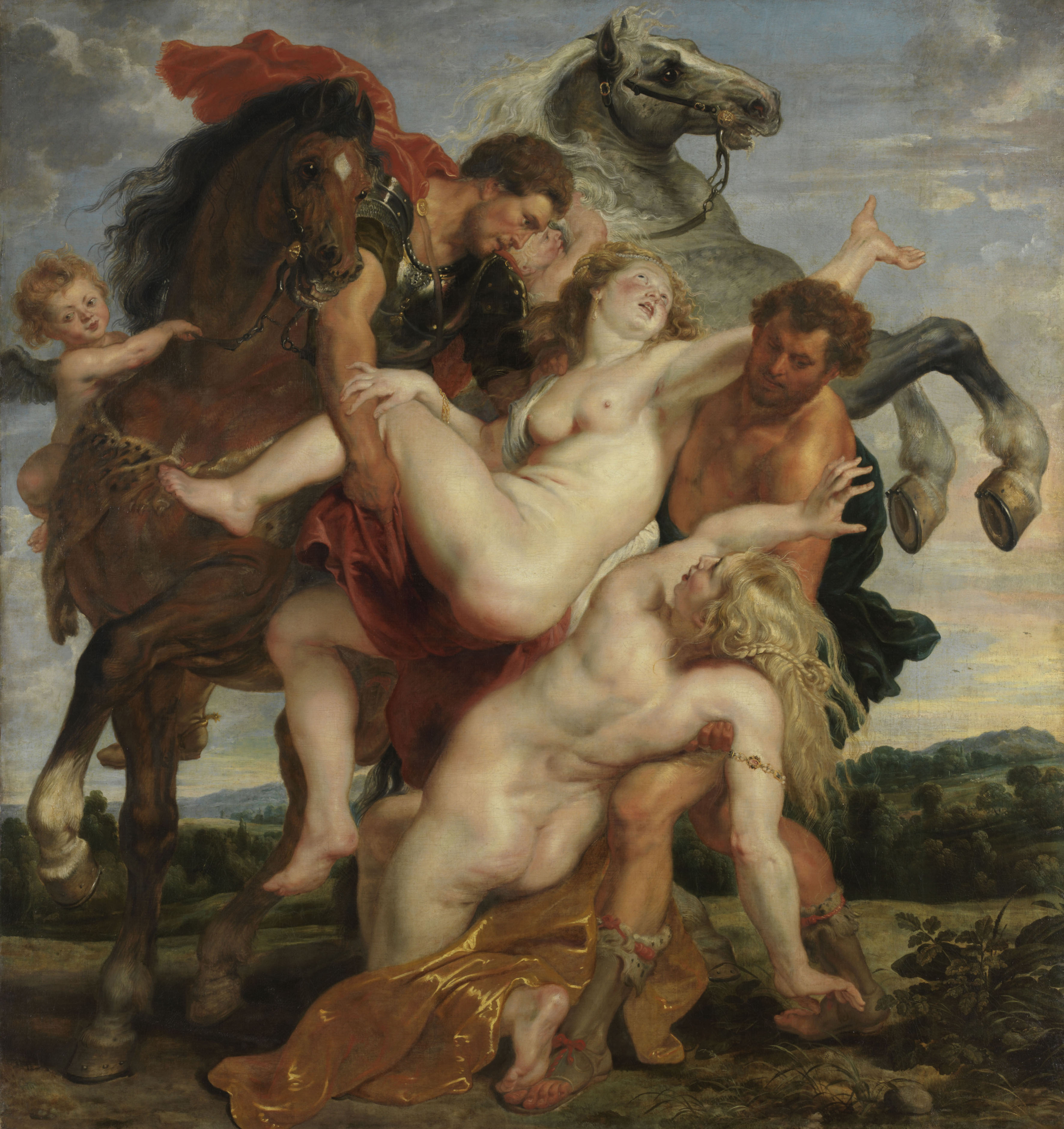
Rape fantasy is common in both men and women

Rape or ravishment is a common sexual fantasy among both men and women, either generically or as an ingredient in a particular sexual scenario. The fantasy may involve the fantasist as either the one being forced or coerced into sexual activity or as the perpetrator. Some studies have found that women tend to fantasize about being forced into sex more commonly than men.

A 1974 study by Hariton and Singer found that being "overpowered or forced to surrender" was the second most frequent fantasy in their survey; a 1984 study by Knafo and Jaffe ranked being overpowered as their study's most common fantasy during intercourse; and a 1988 study by Pelletier and Herold found that over half of their female respondents had fantasies of forced sex.

Other studies have found the theme, but with lower frequency and popularity. However, these female fantasies in no way imply that the subject desires to be raped in reality—the fantasies often contain romantic images where the woman imagines herself being seduced, and the male that she imagines is desirable. Most importantly, the woman remains in full control of her fantasy. The fantasies do not usually involve the woman getting hurt. Conversely, some women who have been sexually victimized in the past report unwanted sexual fantasies, similar to flashbacks of their victimization. They are realistic, and the woman may recall the physical and psychological pain involved.

The most frequently cited hypothesis for why women fantasize of being forced into some sexual activity is that the fantasy avoids societally induced guilt—the woman does not have to admit responsibility for her sexual desires and behavior. A 1978 study by Moreault and Follingstad was consistent with this hypothesis, and found that women with high levels of sex guilt were more likely to report fantasy themed around being overpowered, dominated, and helpless.

In contrast, Pelletier and Herold used a different measure of guilt and found no correlation. Other research suggests that women who report forced sex fantasies have a more positive attitude towards sexuality, contradicting the guilt hypothesis. A 1998 study by Strassberg and Lockerd found that women who fantasized about force were generally less guilty and more erotophilic, and as a result had more frequent and more varied fantasies. Additionally, it said that force fantasies are clearly not the most common or the most frequent.

== Social views ==
Social views on sexual fantasy (and sex in general) differ throughout the world. The privacy of a person's fantasy is influenced greatly by social conditions. Because of the taboo status of sexual fantasies in many places around the world, open discussion—or even acknowledgment—is forbidden, forcing fantasies to stay private. In more lax conditions, a person may share their fantasies with close friends, significant others, or a group of people with whom the person is comfortable.

The moral acceptance and formal study of sexual fantasy in Western culture is relatively new. Prior to their acceptance, sexual fantasies were seen as evil or sinful, and they were commonly seen as horrid thoughts planted into the minds of people by "agents of the devil". Even when psychologists were willing to accept and study fantasies, they showed little understanding and went so far as to diagnose sexual fantasies in females as a sign of hysteria.

Prior to the early twentieth century, many experts viewed sexual fantasy (particularly in females) as abnormal. Sigmund Freud suggested that those who experienced sexual fantasies were sexually deprived or frustrated or that they lacked adequate sexual stimulation and satisfaction. Over several decades, sexual fantasies became more acceptable as notable works and compilations, such as "Morality, Sexual Facts and Fantasies", by Dr Patricia Petersen, Alfred Kinsey's Kinsey Reports, Erotic Fantasies: A Study of the Sexual Imagination by Phyllis and Eberhard Kronhausen, and Nancy Friday's My Secret Garden, were published. Today, they are regarded as natural and positive elements of one's sexuality, and are often used to enhance sexual practices, both in normal settings and in therapy.

Many Christians believe that the Bible prohibits sexual fantasies about people other than one's spouse in Matthew 5:28. Others believe that St Paul includes fantasy when he condemns works of the flesh such as "immorality" or "uncleanness". Despite the Western World's relatively lax attitudes towards sexual fantasy, many people elsewhere still feel shame and guilt about their fantasies. This may contribute to personal sexual dysfunction, and regularly leads to a decline in the quality of a couple's sex life.

== Guilt and jealousy ==
While most people do not feel guilt or disgust about their sexual thoughts or fantasies, a substantial number do. In general, men and women are equally represented in samples of those who felt guilt about their fantasies. The most notable exception was found in a 1991 study that showed that women felt more guilt and disgust about their first sexual fantasies. In women, greater guilt about sex was associated with less frequent and less varied sexual fantasies, and in men, it was associated with less sexual arousal during fantasies. Women also reported more intense guilt than men; both sexes reported greater guilt if their arousal and orgasm depended on a fantasy.

Studies have also been carried out to examine the direct connection between guilt and sexual fantasy, as opposed to sex and guilt. One study found that in a sample of 160 conservative Christians, 16% of men and women reported guilt after sexual fantasies, 5% were unhappy with themselves, and 45% felt that their fantasies were "morally flawed or unacceptable". Studies that examined guilt about sexual fantasy by age have unclear results—Knoth et al. (1998) and Ellis and Symons (1990) found that younger people tended to feel less guilt about their fantasies, whereas Mosher and White (1980) found the opposite.

A 2006 study examined guilt and jealousy in American heterosexual married couples. It associated guilt with an individual's fantasy ("How guilty do you feel when you fantasize about...") and jealousy with the partner's fantasy ("How jealous do you feel when your partner fantasizes about..."). Higher levels of guilt were found among women, couples in the 21–29 age range, shorter relationships and marriages, Republicans, and Roman Catholics; lower levels in men, couples in the 41–76 range, longer relationships, Democrats, and Jews. Higher levels of jealousy were found in women, couples in the 21–29 range, Roman Catholics and non-Jewish religious affiliations; lower levels were found in men, couples in the 41–76 range, and Jews and the non-religious.

== Sexual crimes ==
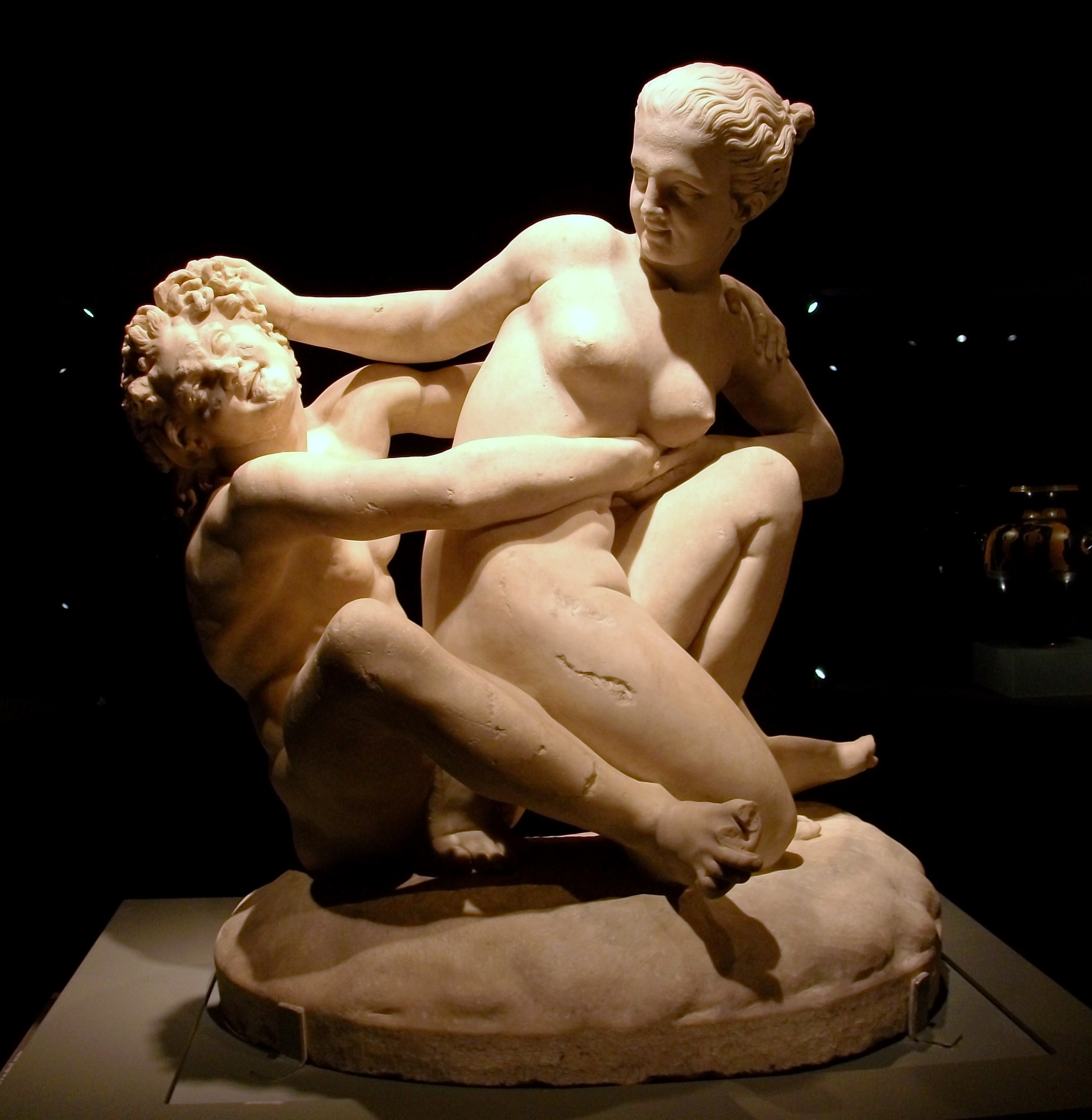
Deviant sexual fantasies involve nonconsensual, illegal and sadistic themes

=== Deviant sexual fantasies ===
Deviant sexual fantasies are sexual fantasies which involve illegal, nonconsensual, and sadistic themes. While people with paraphilia have deviant sexual fantasies, deviant sexual fantasies are not atypical and/or paraphilic. DSM-5 defines paraphilia as intense and persistent atypical preferences for sexual activities or targets like spanking, whipping, binding with erotic targets like children, animals, and/or rubber etc.

While DSM-5 recognizes that paraphilias do not have to be pathological, psychiatrists still find it difficult to differentiate between paraphilic interests and paraphilic disorders, because the concept of normal of sexual fantasies is subjective. It is based on factors like history, society, culture and politics. For example, masturbation, oral, anal and homosexual sex were once illegal in some American states and even considered to be paraphilic disorders in earlier DSM revisions.

When a study used statistical analysis and the Wilson sex fantasy questionnaire to investigate atypical fantasies, having zoophilic or pedophilic fantasies were found to be rare and only 7 themes including urination, crossdressing, rape etc. were considered atypical. A lot of studies have also found that "atypical" sexual fantasies are quite common as indulging in greater varieties of sexual fantasies increases sex-life satisfaction. For example, in 2011 study found that over half of the older men in Berlin had "atypical" sexual fantasies with 21.8% of them having sadistic fantasies–a prerequisite for sexual murders. Another study found that dominance and submission themes were extremely popular in pornographic searches.

=== Sexual crimes ===
Most research into sexual crimes involve men. Sexual crimes such as sexual homicides are quite rare because most deviant sexual fantasizers never engaged in deviant sexual behaviors and are not at risk of engaging in sexual crimes. Some have suggested that the frequency of sexual crimes is underestimated due to the narrowness of the legal definition of sexual homicides. The investigations of sexual crimes face several limitations such as the "definitions of sexual crimes, how and where the crimes are committed, incomplete or inaccurate information due to offender's motive to exaggerate, legal restrictions" and researchers' approaches (the essentialist-descriptive approach or phenomenological descriptive approach).

=== Risk factors ===
Deviant and sadistic sexual fantasies are believed to be the underlying risk factors for sexual crimes. 70–85% of sexual offenders extensively engage in deviant sexual fantasies, and certain themes can be attributed to types of sex crimes. For example, serial sexual murderers have more rape fantasies than non-serial sexual murderers and 82% of offenders that use a weapon engage in violent sexual fantasies. Offenders that report deviant sexual fantasies have also been found to be more dangerous than offenders that do not.

Other risk factors that contribute to the likelihood of sex crimes include biological, physiological and psychological factors like mental disorders (especially paranoia and psychosis); violent history, arrests, poor academic performance, substance abuse, financial gain, unemployment, and watching pornography. However, it is usually the combination of childhood sexual abuse and deviant fantasies that facilitate the jump from sexual fantasies to sexual crimes and the nature of the crimes. For example, most rapists report both early traumatic experiences and sexually deviant fantasies and sex murderers of children reported a significantly more pre-crime childhood sexual abuse and deviant sexual fantasies than sexual murderers of women.

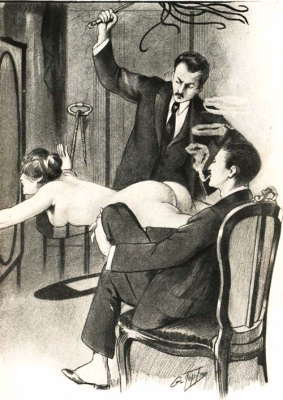
Inflicting pain upon others is a common fantasy of sex offenders, which may include spanking as illustrated in the above image. Produced by Lewis Bald in 1913.

=== Sadistic sexual fantasies ===
Sadistic themes are consistently present in the sexual fantasies of offenders across various types of sexual crimes and varying risk factors. They typically involve finding victims, causing harm/pain during sexual intercourse and feelings of grandiosity/omnipotence during arousal.

They occur in high prevalence alongside other paraphilic fantasies in psychopaths and individuals with dark triad traits. High narcissism correlate strongly with impersonal sexual fantasies and studies suggested that the deviant and sadistic sexual fantasies serve as a coping mechanism for narcissistic vulnerability. Higher levels of psychopathy are associated with, impersonal, unrestricted, deviant, paraphilic and wide ranges of sexual fantasies.

However, it has been suggested that this is due to an increased sex drive, which correlates with paraphilic interests. Also, psychopathy increases the effect that porn has on the development of deviant fantasies such its contribution to the likelihood of engaging in rape fantasies.

The effects of psychopathy go further to increase likelihood of individuals carrying out their unrestricted deviant fantasies in real life such as engaging in BDSM/sadomasochism or even rape. However, BDSM fantasies have become quite common among the general population, possibly due to its normalization by the popular Fifty Shades trilogy. The capitalization of the Fifty Shades trilogy changed the perception of BDSM from being extreme, marginalized and dangerous to being fun, fashionable, and exciting. Mainstreaming Fifty Shades has increased visibility and acceptability of BDSM and has embedded it in everyday life.

=== Sadistic sexual fantasies and crime ===
Sadistic sexual fantasy is one of the key factors for understanding serial killers. Their sexual crimes are "tryouts" that maintain and develop their fantasies; i.e. they commit crimes according to their fantasies, then incorporate the crimes into their fantasies to increase arousal and subsequently develop its sadistic content.

A lot of sexual homicides are well planned due to extensive practice in form of sexual fantasies. The murders involve the infliction of a lot of pain and terror and this serves to satisfy the sadistic fantasy, albeit only temporarily. They start trying to replicate their fantasies more accurately with practice and will continue until they are caught as a fantasy can never be replicated with 100% accuracy.

Childhood abuse plays a significant role in determining if sadistic fantasies will be tried out in real life. Most sexual offenders that suffered childhood sexual abuse reveal an early onset of rape fantasies, and sexual concerns like sexual conflict, incompetence, inhibitions, ignorance and social dysfunction. These concerns cause stress and the offender relies on their deviant fantasies as a coping mechanism for their stress.

The unsuccessful resolution of the aforementioned issues causes an obsession with their fantasy world, where they feel in control. They become heavily invested in their deviant fantasies and when their fantasies start to lose their effectiveness due to desensitization or repression, they escalate and start actualizing their fantasies to relieve internal stress. They plan their crimes to feel arousal or commit violent compulsive murders. Violent compulsive crimes are impulsive and occur because resistance and restrictions that prevent violent and sadistic fantasies from being acted out, can lead to anxiety or psychosomatic manifestations. These manifestations then cause uncontrollable desires to act out one's fantasy in order to find relief.

Researchers found that the sadistic contents in fantasies began appearing about 1–7 years after the start of masturbation. Due to social awkwardness, most offenders lacked the opportunity to practice their sexual skills with a desired partner or gender and this contributes significantly to their reliance on their fantasies. Eventually, their fantasies and "tryouts" become their only source of arousal.

Some studies suggest that deviant sexual scripts might be learnt through social learning theory due to an early exposure via sexual molestation and reinforcements by orgasms and masturbation. However, not all sexually molested children grow up to be offenders unable to stop themselves from acting out their fantasies. MacCulloch and colleagues have suggested that the early traumatic experiences cause the early development of sadistic fantasies through sensory preconditioning and this might be the reason offenders find it too difficult to restrain themselves from trying out their sadistic fantasies in real life.

While some might argue cognitive distortions as the cause of sexual crimes such as pedophilia, evidence suggests that cognitive distortions are used to justify actions after caught and do not motivate them.

== See also ==
- Sexual deviant
- Sexual kink
- Sexual repression
- Cybersex
- Cybersexuality
- Teledildonics
