= Orgy =

People freely engaging in open and unrestrained sexual activity or group sex

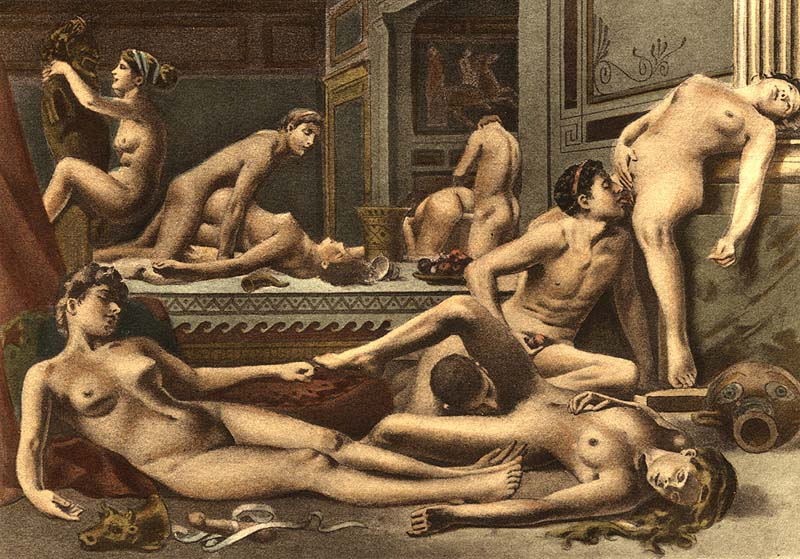
Illustration of an orgy from De figuris Veneris by Édouard-Henri Avril

An orgy is a sex party where guests freely engage in open and unrestrained sexual activity or group sex.

Swingers' parties do not always conform to this designation, because at many swinger parties the sexual partners may all know each other or at least have some commonality among economic class, educational attainment or other shared attributes. Some swingers contend that an orgy, as opposed to a sex party, requires some anonymity of sexual partners in complete sexual abandon. Other kinds of "sex parties" may fare less well with this labelling.

Participation in an "orgy" is a common sexual fantasy, and group sex targeting such consumers is a subgenre in pornographic films.

The term is also used metaphorically in expressions, such as an "orgy of colour" or an "orgy of destruction" to indicate excess or overabundance. The term "orgiastic" does not generally connote group sex and is closer to the classical roots and this metaphorical usage.

== Ancient orgia ==
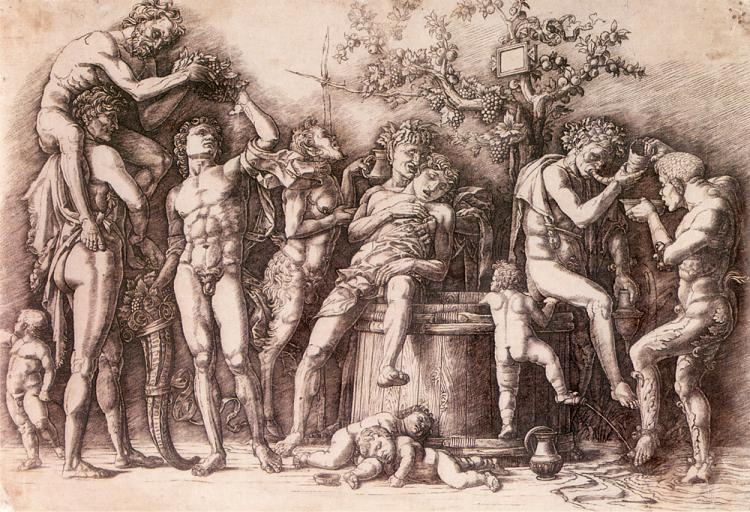
Bacchanal with a wine vat (c. 1475) by Andrea Mantegna

In ancient Greek religion, orgia (ὄργια, sing. ὄργιον, orgion) were ecstatic rites characteristic of the Greek and Hellenistic mystery religions. Unlike public religion, or the private religious practices of a household, the mysteries were open only to initiates, and were thus "secret". Some rites were held at night. Orgia were part of the Eleusinian Mysteries, the Dionysian Mysteries, and the cult of Cybele, which involved the castration of her priests in a frenzied trance. Because of their secret, nocturnal, and unscripted nature, the orgia were subject to prurient speculation and regarded with suspicion, particularly by the Romans, who attempted to suppress the Bacchanals in 186 BC. Orgia are popularly thought to have involved sex, but, while sexuality and fertility were cultic concerns, the primary goal of the orgia was to achieve an ecstatic union with the divine. The Adamites were also accused of participating in orgies.

== See also ==
- Bacchanalia
- Gang bang
- Khlysts
