= Friedrich Karl Forberg =

German philosopher and classical scholar (1770–1848)

Friedrich Karl Forberg (30 August 1770, Meuselwitz – 1 January 1848, Hildburghausen) was a German philosopher and classical scholar.

== Biography ==
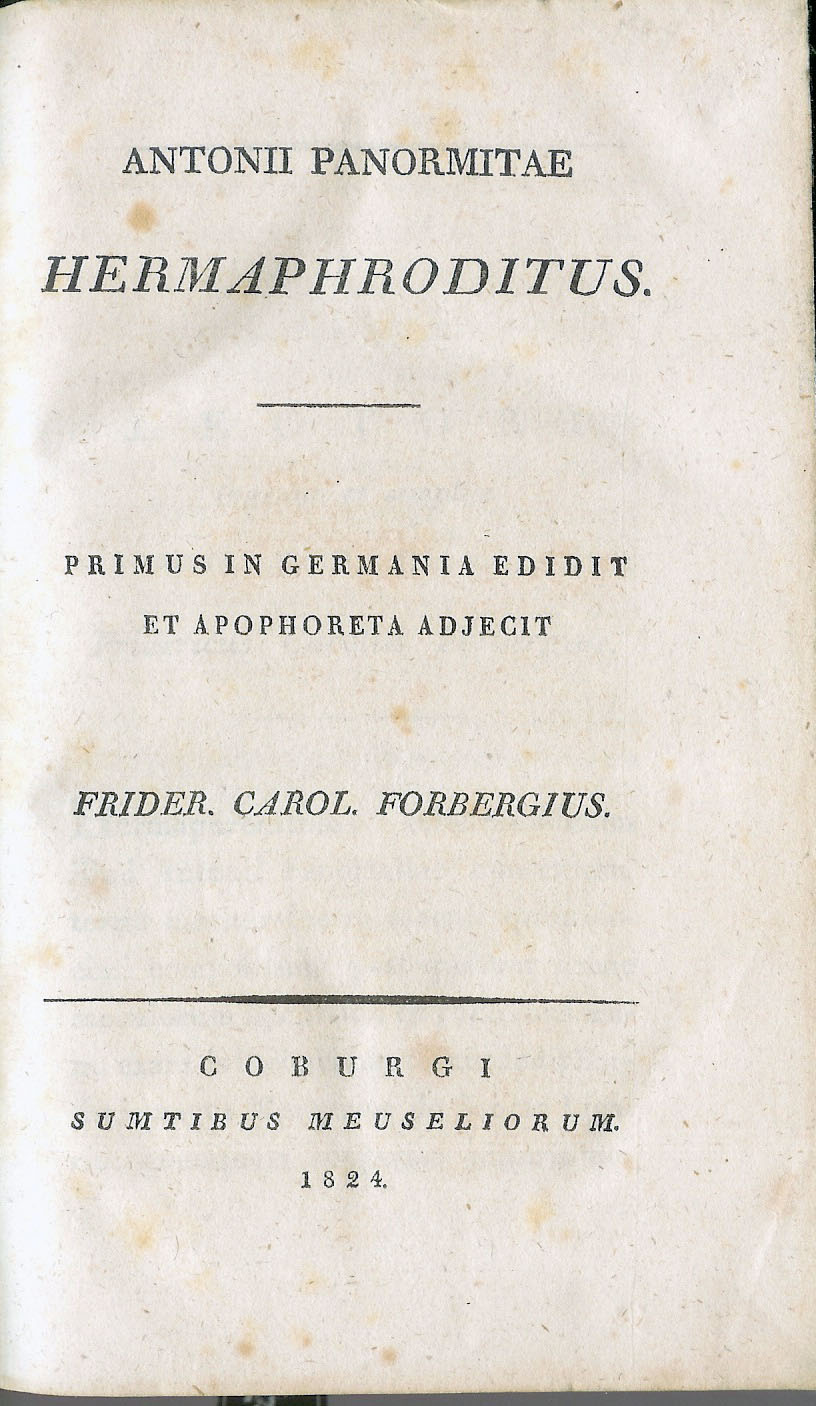
Hermaphroditus (1824), title page

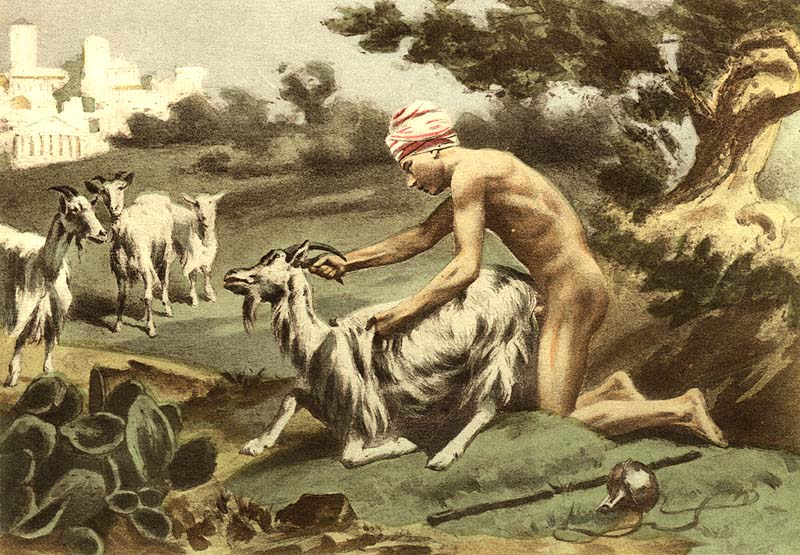
Plate XVII by Édouard-Henri Avril for an edition of Forberg's De Figuris Veneris

Born in 1770 in Thuringia, Forberg studied under Karl Leonhard Reinhold at Jena. In 1791 he travelled to Klagenfurt, writing to Reinhold that there was much sympathy for the French Revolution, and to the followers of Immanuel Kant that the young ladies of Klagenfurt substituted Kant's writings (modestly bound in black) for their prayer books.

He was a headmaster at Saalfeld/Saale, and from 1801 to 1826 Director of the Sächsische Landesbibliothek. His philosophical publications are less known now than his 1824 edition of an erotic poem sequence in renaissance Latin, Hermaphroditus by Antonio Beccadelli. This was accompanied by Forberg's own learned commentary, which took the form of a catalogue and anthology of descriptions of sexual acts and postures in classical and later literature.

Forberg's journal article regarding religion and its effect on morality initiated the Atheism Dispute which resulted in Johann Gottlieb Fichte's dismissal from his professorship.

== Works ==
- 1796 (anonymous) Fragmente aus meinen Papieren
- 1797 "Briefe über die neueste Philosophie", in Philosophisches Journal
- 1798 "Entwickelung des Begriffs der Religion", in Philosophisches Journal
- 1802 Von den Pflichten des Gelehrten
- 1824 Antonii Panormitae Hermaphroditus
  - The commentary to the poem is better known as a separate publication under the titles De figuris Veneris, variously translated as Manual of classical erotology, Manuel d’érotologie classique or Manual de erótica clásica (Edición de Luis Parra y José M. Ruiz, Ediciones Clásicas, Madrid 2007)
- 1840 Lebenslauf eines Verschollenen
