= Rape fantasy =

Sexual fantasy involving coercible sex

A rape fantasy (sometimes referred to as rapeplay) or a ravishment is a sexual fantasy involving imagining or pretending being coerced or forcefully coercing another into sexual activity. In sexual roleplay, it involves acting out roles of coercive sex. Rape pornography is literature, images or video associated with rape (and sometimes Stockholm syndrome) as a means of sex.

== Fantasy ==
Studies have found rape fantasy among both men and women. One study found that over half of their female respondents have had a fantasy of forced sex in their life. The fantasy may involve the fantasist as either the one being forced into sex or being the perpetrator.

The most frequently cited hypothesis for why women fantasize about being forced and coerced into some sexual activity is that the fantasy avoids societally induced guilt: the woman does not have to admit responsibility for her sexual desires and behavior.

A 1978 study by Moreault and Follingstad was consistent with this hypothesis and found that women with high levels of sex guilt were more likely to report fantasy themed around being overpowered, dominated, and helpless. In contrast, Pelletier and Herold used a different measure of guilt and found no correlation. Other research suggests that women who report forced sex fantasies have a more positive attitude towards sexuality, contradicting the guilt hypothesis. A 1998 study by Strassberg and Locker found that women who fantasized about force were generally less guilty and more erotophilic, and as a result had more frequent and varied fantasies. However, it said that force fantasies are not the most common or the most frequent.

A male sexual fantasy of raping a woman may bring sexual arousal either from imagining a scene in which first a woman objects but then comes to like and eventually participate in the intercourse, or else one in which the woman does not like it and arousal is associated with the idea of hurting the woman.

=== Prevalence among genders ===
Numerous studies have found that fantasies about being forced to have sex are commonly found across all genders. 45.8% of men in a 1980 study reported fantasizing during heterosexual intercourse about "a scene where [they had] the impression of being raped by a woman" (3.2% often and 42.6% sometimes), 44.7% of scenes where a seduced woman "pretends resisting" and 33% of raping a woman.

A 1998 study in the Archives of Sexual Behavior which surveyed 137 female undergraduate students aged 18 to 40 found that 40% had at some time had a fantasy where they were "overpowered or forced to surrender". This was lower than the population who had had a fantasy where they imagined "having sex in a public or semipublic place" (57%) but higher than the number who had had fantasies where they imagined themselves "as a striptease dancer‚ harem girl‚ or other performers" (35%). The population that reported these fantasies and were "very likely to act out that fantasy" was 6%. Among women who said they had had a rape fantasy in the past, the average frequency of their experience was three times a month.

In contrast a study published in The Journal of Sex Research from 2009 using a survey of 355 undergraduates, 81% of whom were between the ages of 18 and 21 indicated that "62% of women have had a rape fantasy". It found that over the entire population sampled 32% had not had a rape fantasy, 49% had had a rape fantasy once a month or less, and 14% had had rape fantasies once a week or more.

In a 2018 study published in Tell Me What You Want among over 4,000 Americans, 61% of female respondents had fantasized about being forced to have sex; meanwhile, the numbers were 54% among men. According to the same study, 20% of women had fantasized about forcing sex on someone else before as well as 38% of men

== Roleplay ==
One form of sexual roleplaying is the rape fantasy, also called "ravishment" or "forced sex roleplay". In BDSM circles (and occasionally outside these circles as well), some people choose to roleplay rape scenes—with communication, consent and safety being especially crucial elements.

Though consent is a crucial component of any sexual roleplay, the illusion of non-consent (i.e. rape) is important to maintaining this type of fantasy. A safe word is therefore a common safety measure, given that words that would normally halt sexual activity (e.g. "stop") are often disregarded in these scenes. Continuing with the sexual roleplay after a safeword has been used constitutes rape, as the use of a safeword indicates the withdrawal of consent.

== See also ==
- Consent in BDSM
- Forced seduction
- Hybristophilia
- Erotophilia
