= Gamiani =

1833 French erotic novel

Gamiani, or Two Nights of Excess
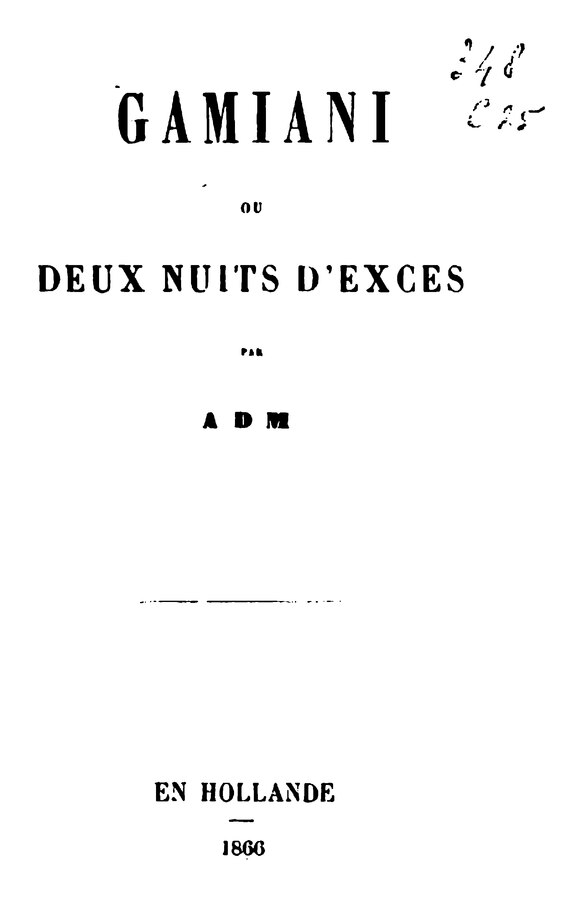
- Title page (1866 edition)
- Author: Alfred de Musset
- Illustrator: Édouard-Henri Avril
- Language: French
- Genre: Erotic
- Publication date: 1833
- Publication place: France
- Pages: 60 pages
- ISBN: 978-1-59654-221-1

Gamiani, or Two Nights of Excess (French: Gamiani, ou deux nuits d'excès) is a French erotic novel first published in 1833. Its authorship is anonymous, but it is believed to have been written by Alfred de Musset, and it was rumoured that the lesbian eponymous heroine was a portrait of his lover, George Sand. It became a bestseller among nineteenth-century erotic literature.

== Illustrations ==
The novel was illustrated with unsigned lithographs whose authorship remains unknown. They have been attributed to Achille Devéria and Octave Tassaert, among others.

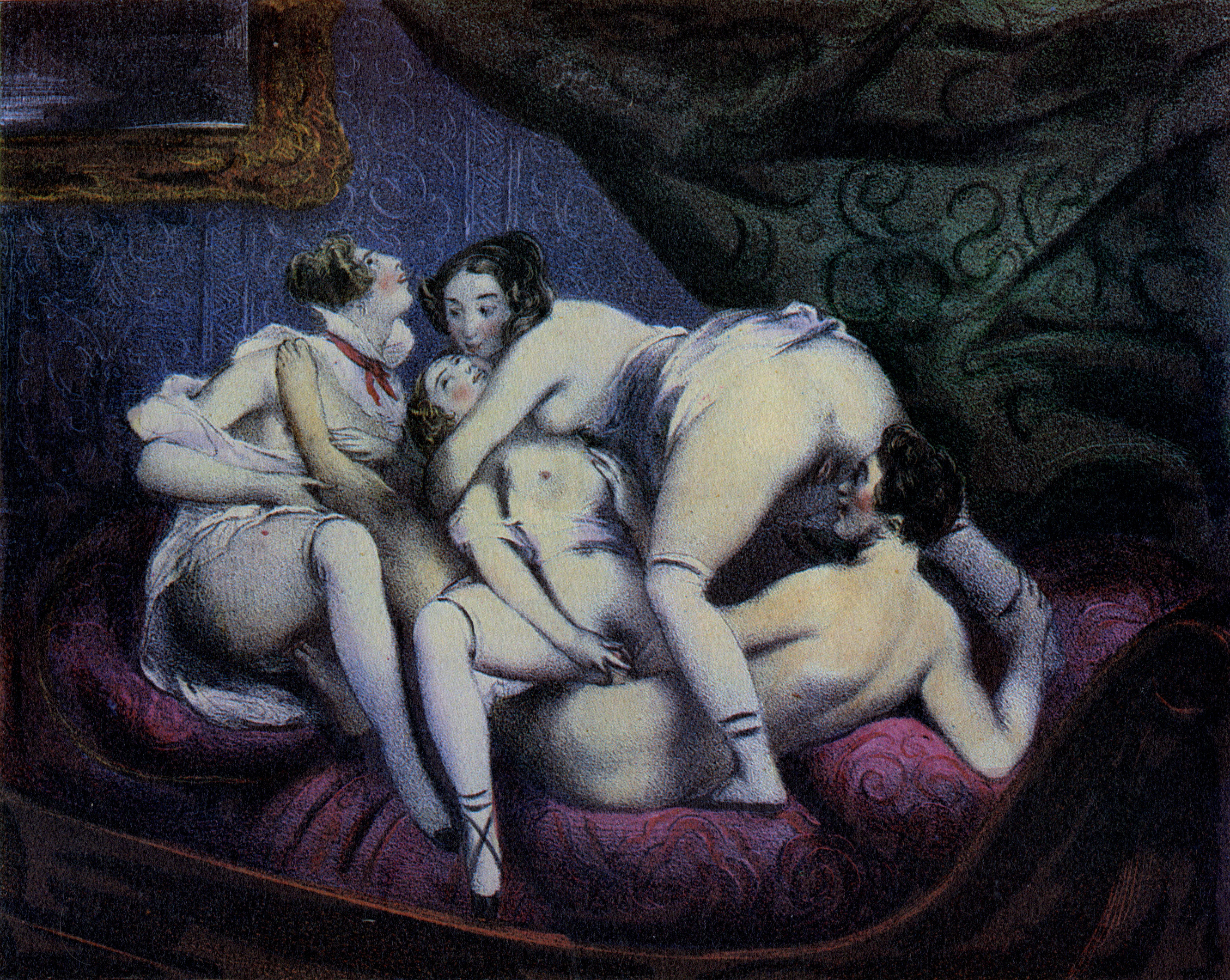

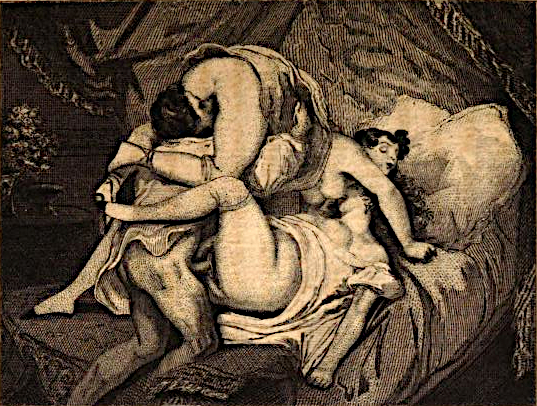

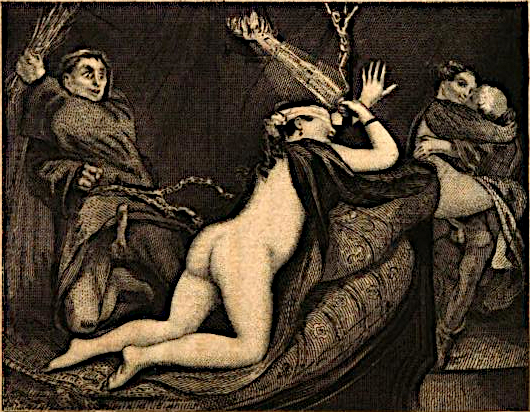

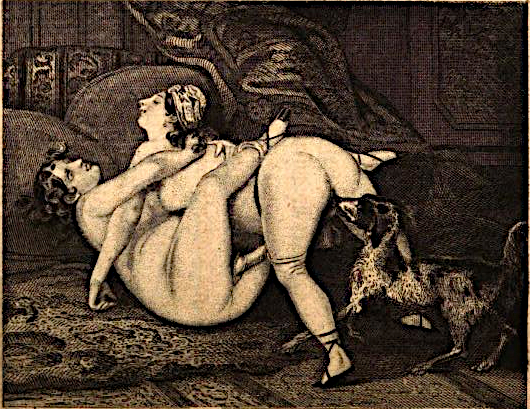

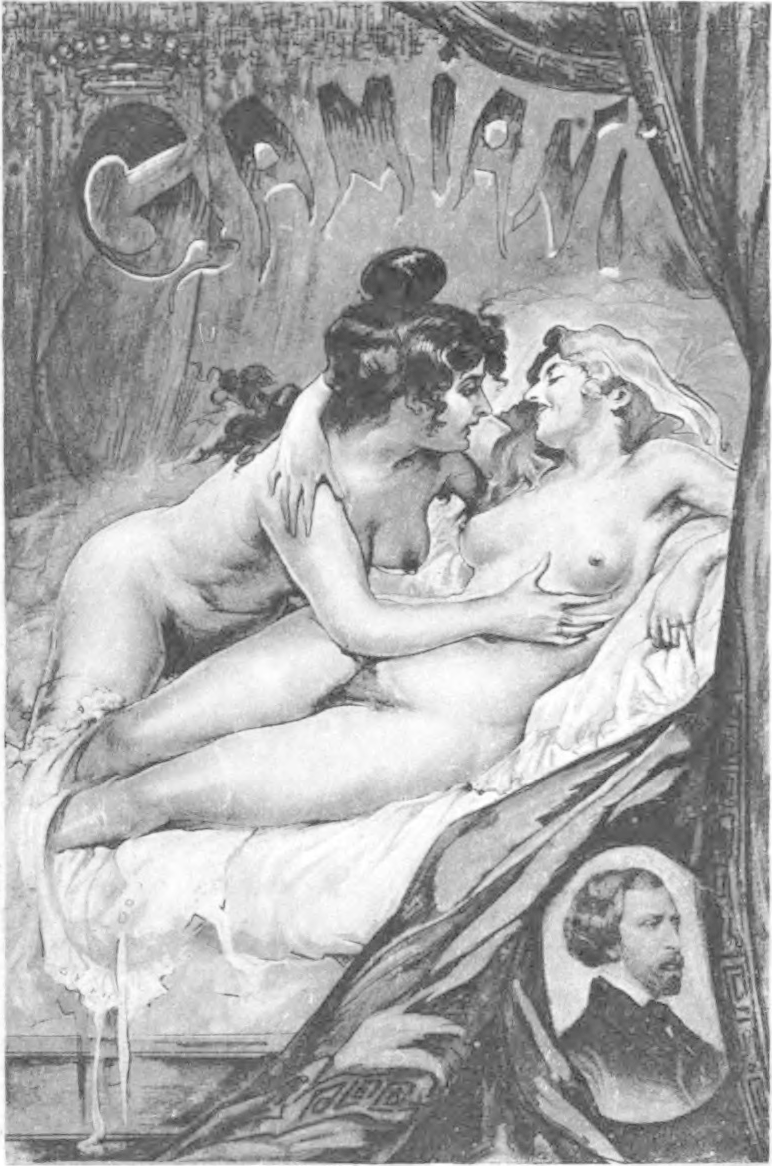

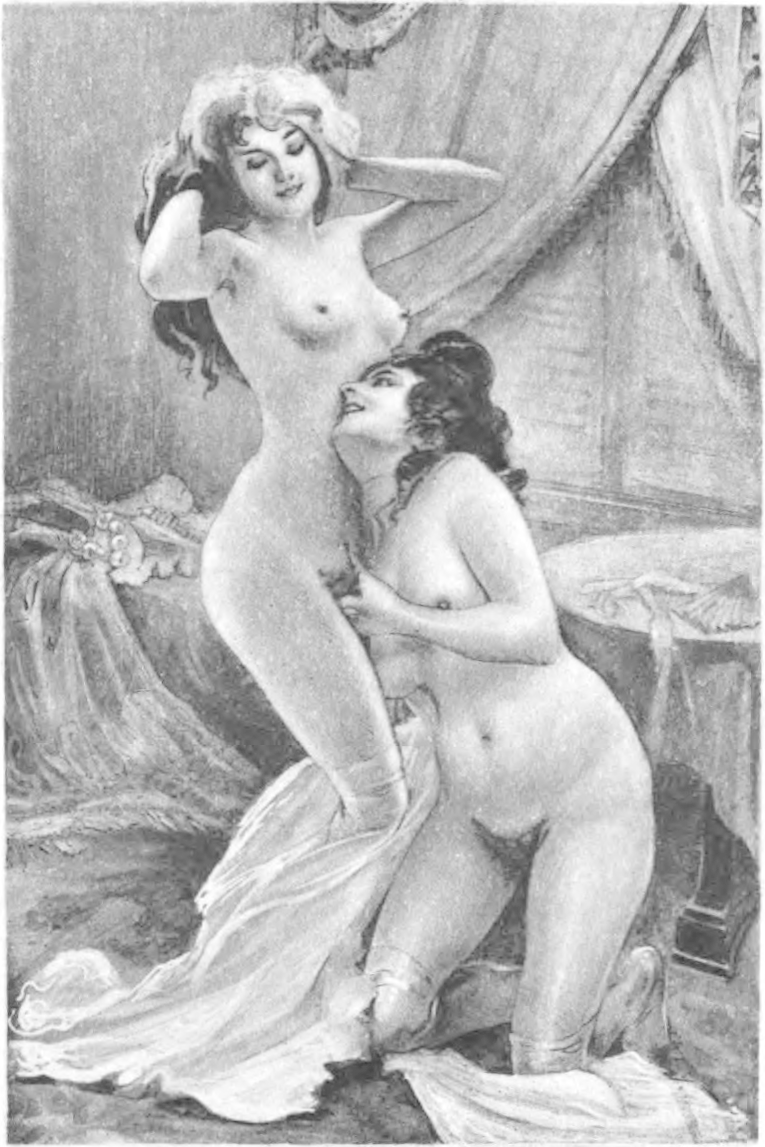

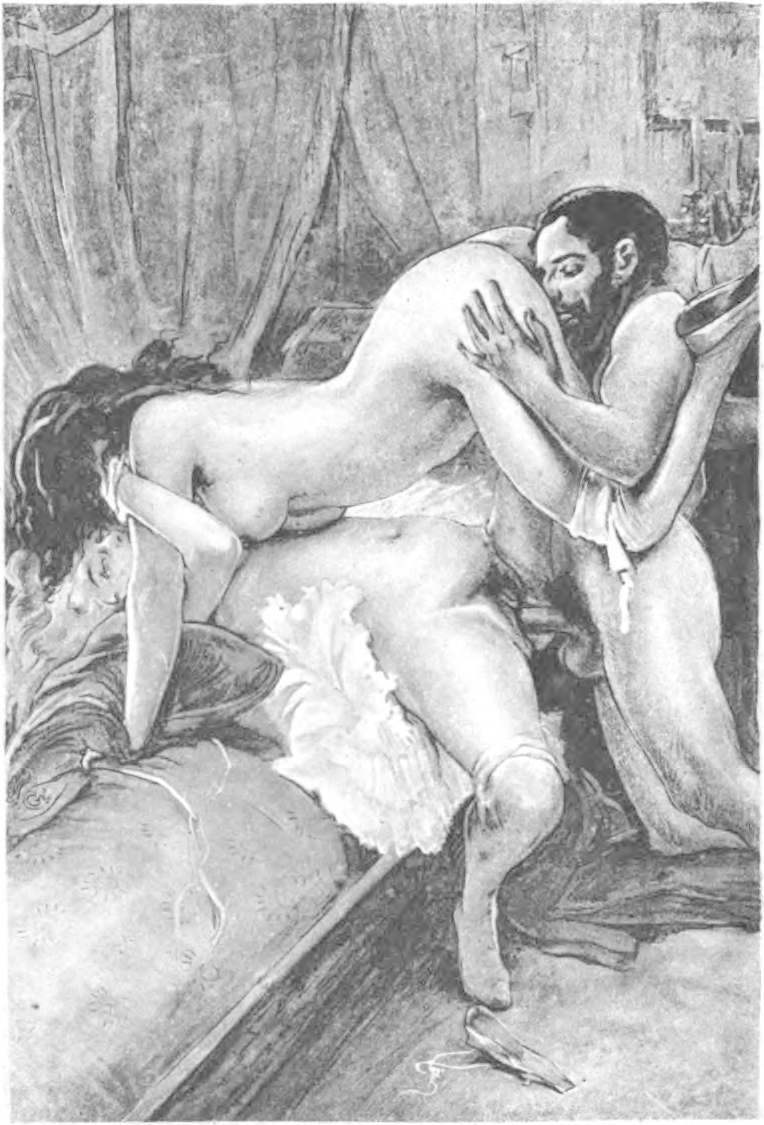

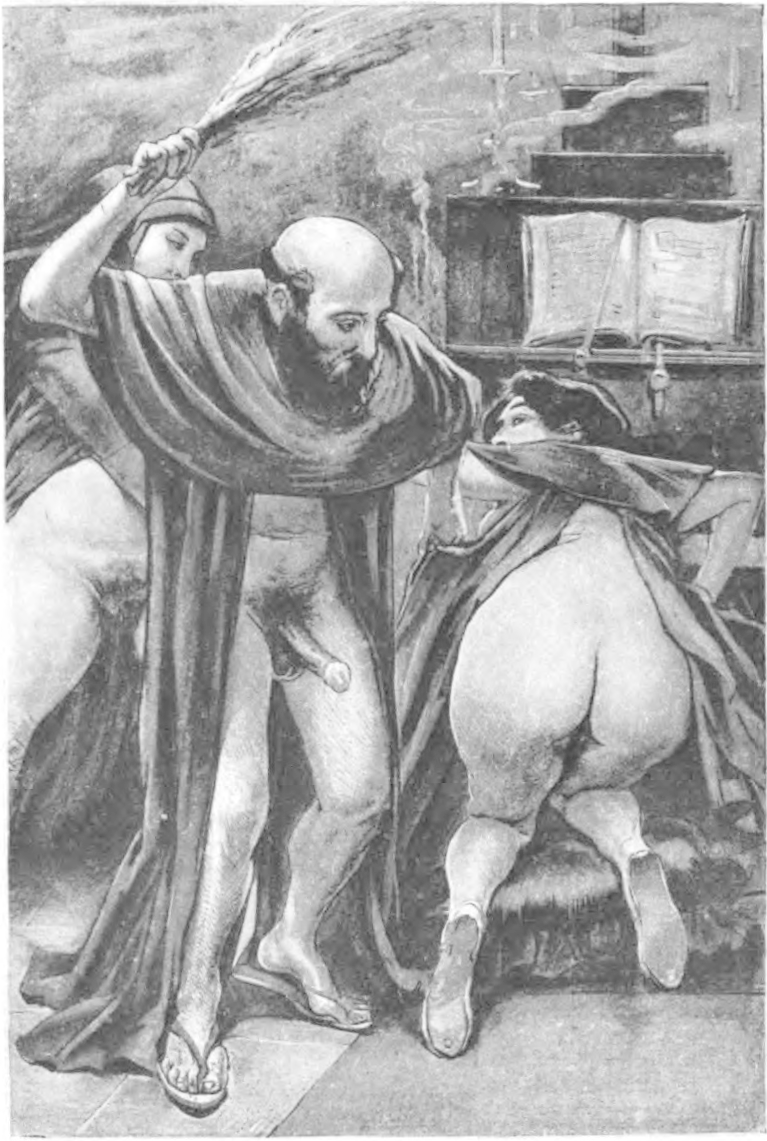

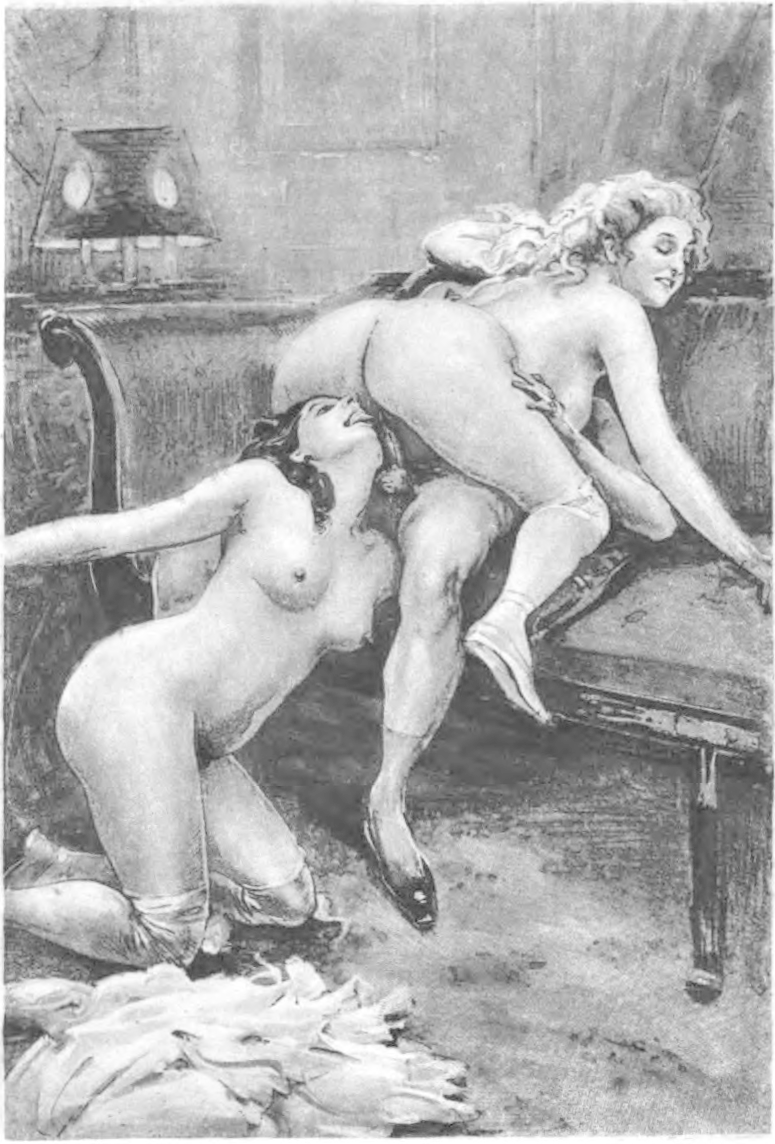

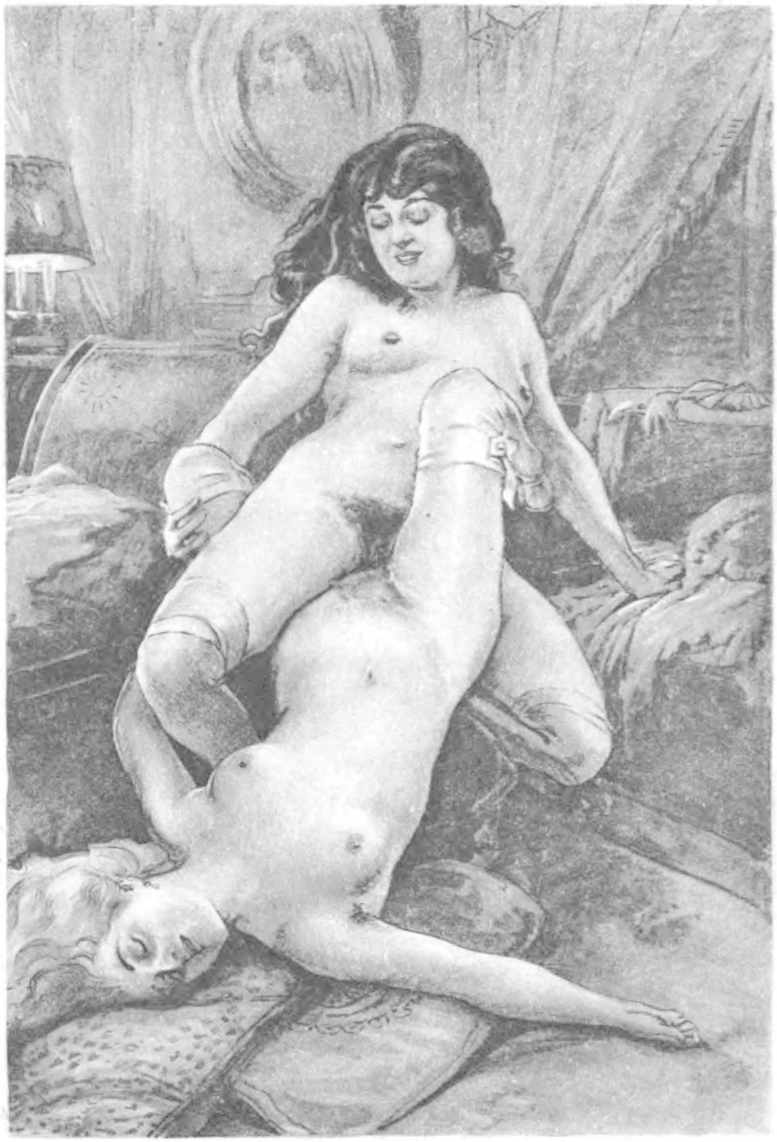

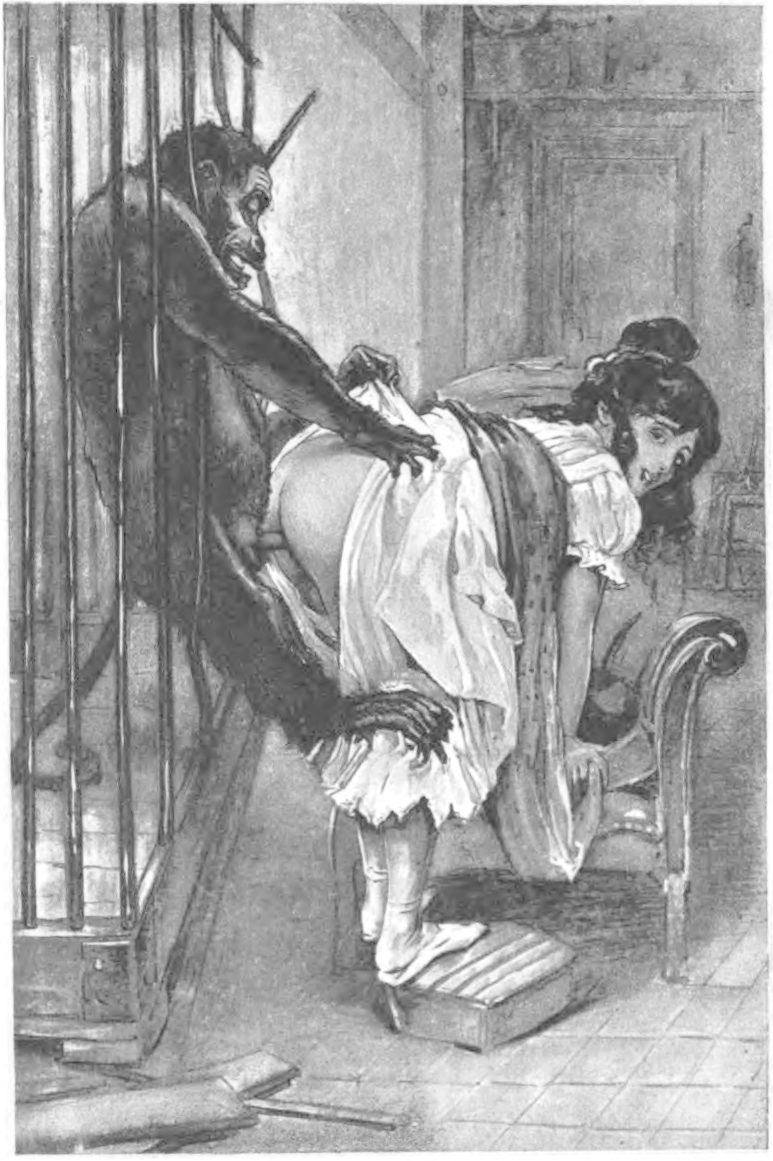

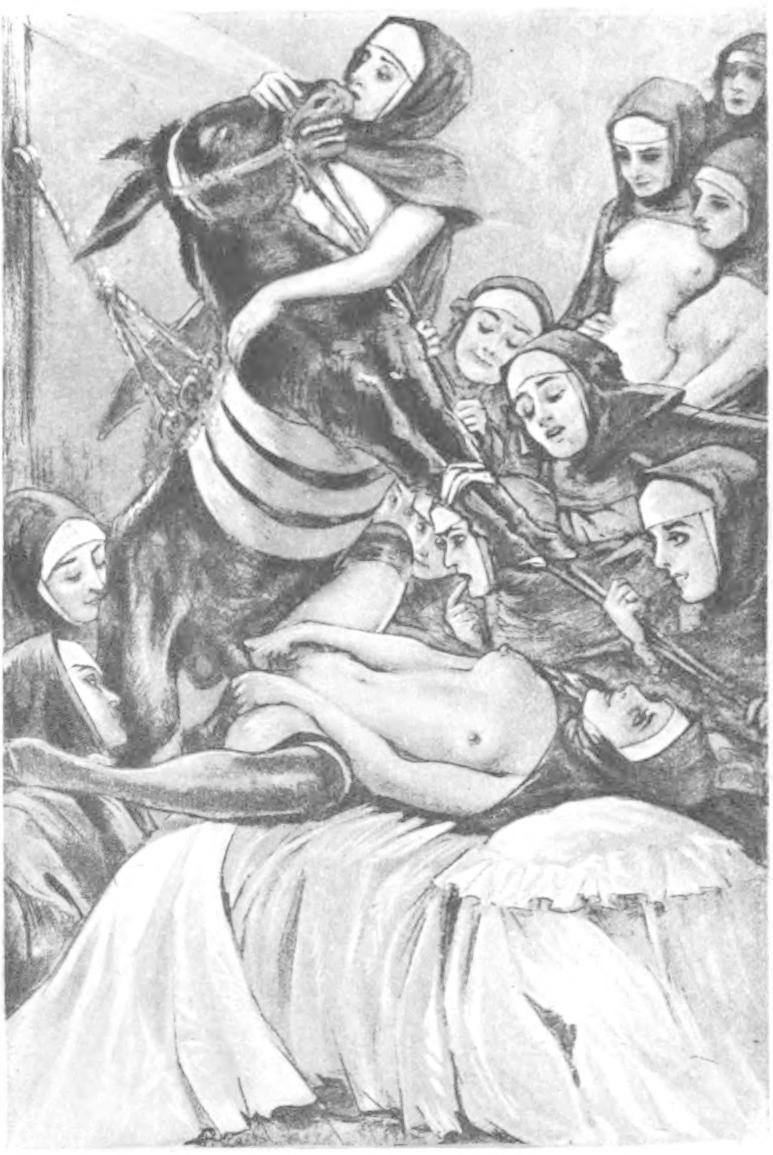

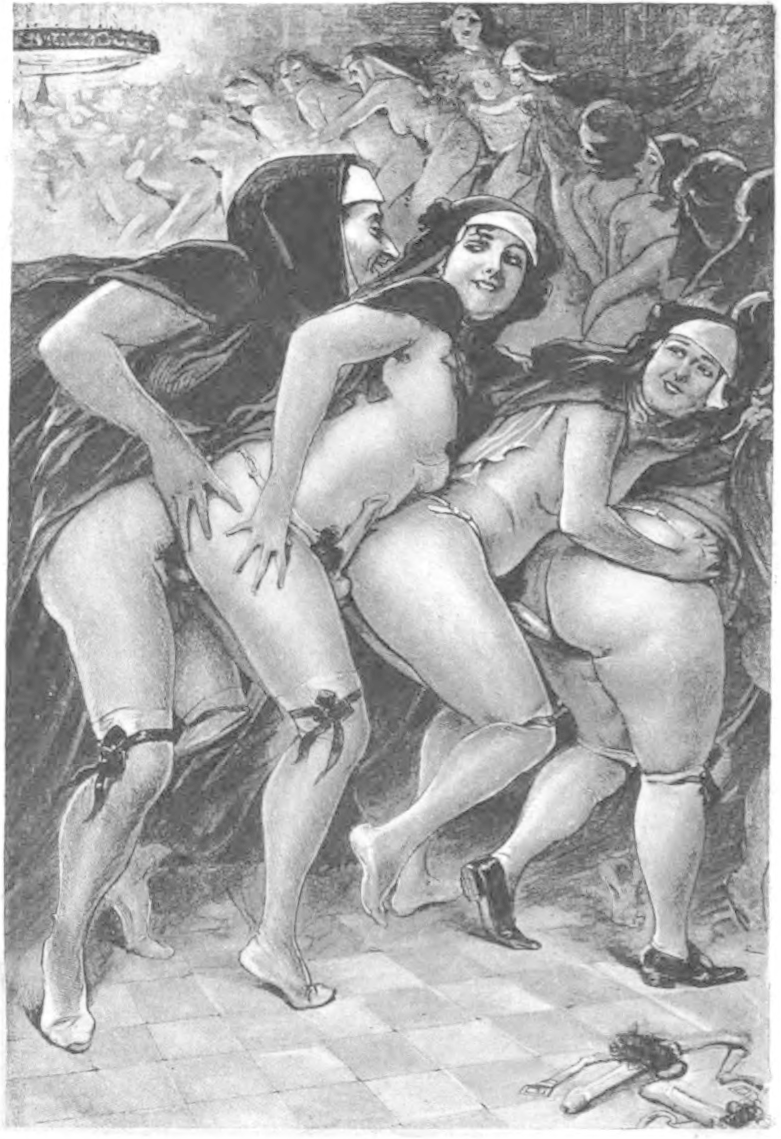

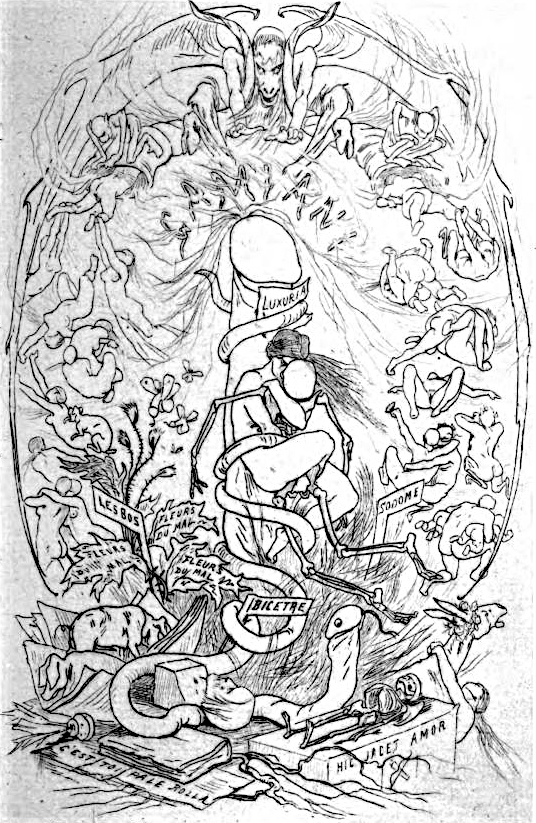

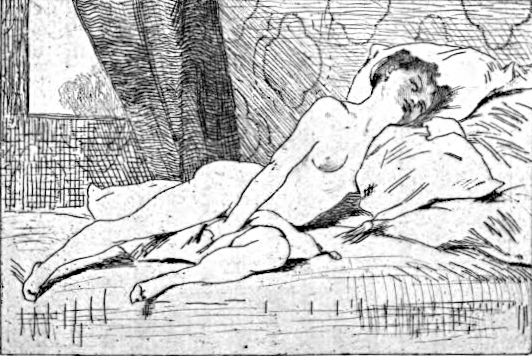

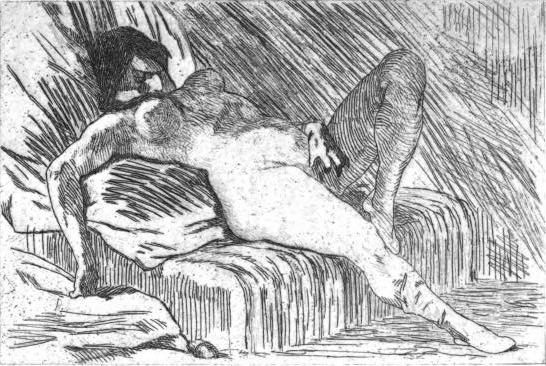

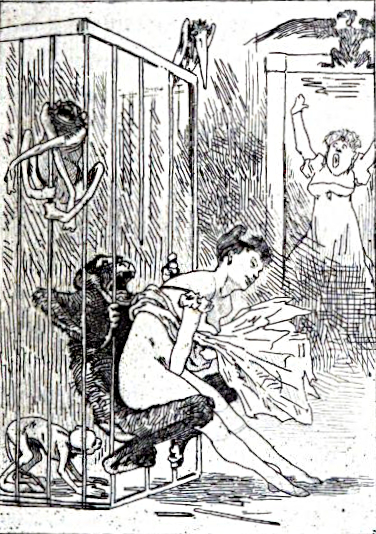

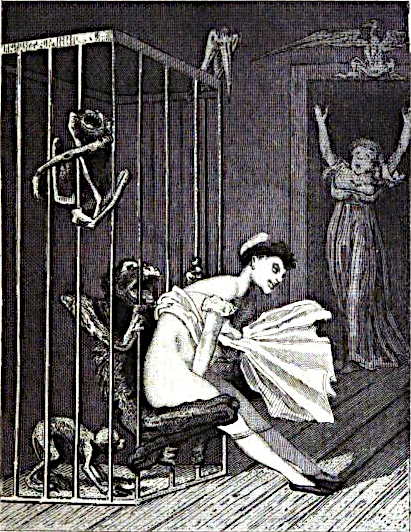

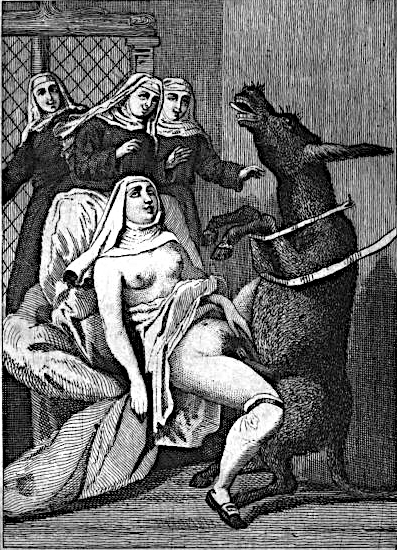

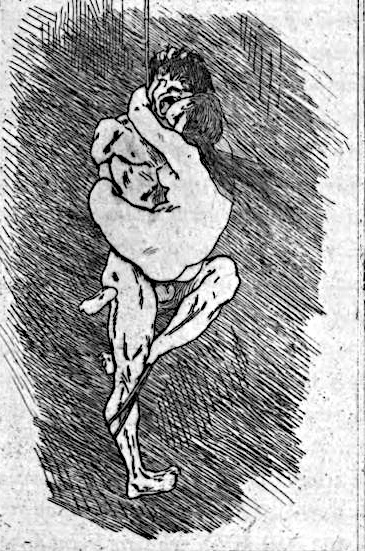
