= Erotophobia =

Fear of, or negative attitudes about, sex

Erotophobia is a term to describe a fear or aversion to sex or related matters. It was coined by a number of researchers in the late 1970s and early 1980s to describe one pole on a continuum of attitudes and beliefs about sexuality. The word is derived from the name of Eros, the Greek god of erotic love, and Phobos (φόβος), the god of fear. The model of the continuum is a basic polarized line, with erotophobia (fear of sex or negative attitudes about sex) at one end and erotophilia (positive feelings or attitudes about sex) at the other end.

== Types ==
Erotophobia has many manifestations. An individual or culture can have one or multiple erotophobic attitudes. Some types of erotophobia include fear of nudity, fear of sexual images, negative attitudes towards heterosexuality, homosexuality, negative attitudes towards people with STIs, fear of sex education, fear of sexual discourse.

== Clinical significance ==
As a clinical phobia, "erotophobia" describes an irrational and potentially debilitating fear of some object, person or act that is related to sex. This fear either impairs a person's desire or ability to have sexual relationships, or completely prevents a person's ability to have sex. Erotophobia can also in some (but not all) individual cases, be a part of larger patterns of any of the following psychological problems—social phobia, avoidant personality disorder, body dysmorphic disorder, or general social anxiety problems. Erotophobia can also, for others, be very specific to love making with another person and not be related to any of these other social anxiety disorders. In the case of specific erotophobia, only the fear of something related to sex would be present without any other fears or syndromes.

== Psychological studies ==
In psychological studies, the term is often used to describe degree of (general) sexual aversion versus (general) interest in sex. In this sense erotophobia is descriptive of one's place in a range on a continuum of sexual feeling or aversion to feeling. Erotophobes score high on one end of the scale that is characterized by expressions of guilt and fear about sex. Psychologists sometimes attempt to describe sexuality on a personality scale. Erotophobes are less likely to talk about sex, have more negative reactions to sexually explicit material, and have sex less frequently and with fewer partners over time. In contrast, erotophiles score high on the opposite end of the scale, erotophilia, which is characterized by expressing less guilt about sex, talking about sex more openly, and holding more positive attitudes toward sexually explicit material.

The continuum of attitudes between erotophilia and erotophobia has been used to assess attitudes to sex and sexuality. Research on this continuum has shown a correlation between high erotophobia scores and less willingness to use condoms (but not necessarily other contraceptive methods), and less knowledge of topics relating to sex.

It is also important because erotophobia has been shown to create relationship and marital difficulties in multiple studies, dating back to Kinsey.

== Political use ==
In his book The Politics of Lust, author and sexual activist John Ince examines three distinct cause and effect forces that fuel erotophobia: "antisexualism", the irrational negative response to harmless sexual expression; "nasty sex", which includes rape and violent pornography; and "rigidity", the inability to enjoy "playful and spontaneous" sex. Ince also argues that social inequality and politics are interlinked with erotophobia and that overcoming erotophobia is one of the first steps to a truly democratic society.

== See also ==
- Antisexualism
- Asexuality
- Body dysmorphic disorder
- Celibacy
- Erotophilia
- Feminist sex wars
- Genophobia
- List of phobias
- Openness to experience
- Prude
- Sexophobia
- Sexual anhedonia
- Sexual ethics
- Sexual inhibition
- Sexual repression
