= Cybersexuality =

How a person identifies sexually when online

In psychology and human sexuality, cybersexuality is how a person identifies sexually while performing online activities like chatting, posting on forums and interacting on dating sites or virtual worlds like Second Life. A person's cybersexuality may and often does differ from how they identify offline.

== History ==
The term "cybersexuality" was born out of the expansion of access to the World Wide Web during the 1990s from dial up services like AOL and Compuserve. The word was derived from the term "cyber", first used in the 1940s is reference to human cybernetics, introduced by Norbert Wiener in his 1948 book Cybernetics: Or Control and Communication in the Animal and the Machine. "Cybersexuality" is derived from a combination of the Greek kybernētēs, meaning to steer or govern and the Latin term sexuālitās, which comes from the Latin noun sexus, which means a sex, state of being either male or female.

=== 1980s and 1990s ===
The groundwork for the terminology was laid further in the 1980s with books like William Gibson's Neuromancer and Donna Haraway's "A Cyborg Manifesto", both of which explore themes of sexuality in the newly developing cyber world. Blade Runner, released in 1982, also explores androids and replicants questioning sexuality, and the 1985 film Weird Science was one of the first to explore sexual attraction to a virtually created woman operating with artificial intelligence that could pass the Turing test. The 1980s also saw the first popular example of sexuality being introduced into video games: Sierra Entertainment released Leisure Suit Larry in the Land of the Lounge Lizards, where gamers could instruct characters into implied sexual activities.

The term cybersexuality first appeared in the 1990s as cybersex became accessible through the internet through chat rooms, email, and online dating websites with the explosion of access to dial-up internet. One of the first uses of the word can be traced to a 1995 article in the Body & Science journal in 1995 by Samantha Holland called "No BODY is 'Doing It': Cybersexuality as a Postmodern Narrative". Holland's paper frames cybersexuality as a postmodern narrative where virtual interactions allow identity play free from physical constraints.

Jenny Wolmark helped the term gain significant traction with the publication of her book, Cybersexualities: A Reader on Feminist Theory, Cyborgs and Cyberspace in 1999. In the publication, cybersexuality is positioned as a gender bending philosophy, exploring sexual expressions and challenging patriarchal structures. The book dives further into cybersexuality by exploring digital embodiment and gender fluidity. Similarly, Kathryn Bigelow's 1995 film Strange Days explores technological themes of virtually taping others' sexual experiences by using a quantum recording device that is attached to the cerebral cortex, allowing customers to experience not only what they saw but what they felt as well.

=== 21st century ===
While in the 1990s, discussions of cybersexuality focused on text-based virtual sexual interactions and their implications for identity and power dynamics, they changed when the new millennia brought high speed internet, which enabled interactions through online virtual worlds and video chat with webcams. Early online social networks expanded interactions, allowing users to generate complete online profiles that could widely differ from their offline identity, further expanding the possibilities in which internet users could express independent or unique cybersexuality. Wikisexuality is an example.

Online users were introduced to new ways to explore their cybersexuality by advancements in technology that brought online virtual reality, allowing participants to use avatars to express themselves and participate in virtual sexual activities using completely fabricated identities. As the online word grows and people explore cybersexuality, real world consequences manifest from the virtual world actions. In 2024 in Britain, police were investigating the first case of virtual rape where a girl's virtual avatar was attacked by a group of other virtual avatars, rendering her with psychological trauma, allegedly similar to a real world attack.

The film and TV industry has kept pace with technology. Films like Ex-Machina and Her deal dealing with sexuality and virtual intimacy with sentient AI, and movies like Stephen Spielberg's Ready Player One and the Bruce Willis film Surrogates showcase the realities of modern cybersexuality where players can act sexual fantasies through avatars that disguise their sex, body type and physical appearance. In the 2025 film Companion, the main character develops an intimate relationship with a sexbot whose programming is jailbroken to allow for an aggressive behavior and criminal activities.

Further advancements with mobile and artificial intelligence have allowed users to explore cybersexuality continuously and with non-biological partners. Studies have centered around the psychological effects and addictive nature of online sexual activities. In 2018, Akihito Kondo married a social media hologram. While the marriage was not legally recognized by Japanese government, the relationship brought ethical questions about virtual relationships. Large language model chatbots like Grok and OpenAI have exacerbated the ethical issues, and several announcements of people engaging in relationships with AI occurred in 2025.

Advancements in VR, AI, and pandemic-driven digital shifts have integrated cybersexuality into discussions of digital intimacy, addiction treatment, and public health, emphasizing vulnerabilities and prevention. The COVID-19 pandemic accelerated online sexual activities, contributing to discussions on cybersexuality as it relates to compulsive reliance. Cybersexuality has transitioned from addiction-focused empirical studies to a multifaceted field addressing VR, AI, and health implications. Cybersexuality is a growing field of study in addiction, behavioral psychology and sociology with a variety of books and scholarly papers covering the subject.

== Bibliography ==
- Cybernetics: Or Control and Communication in the Animal and the Machine
- No BODY is ‘Doing It’:Cybersexuality as a Postmodern Narrative
- Cybersexualities: A Reader on Feminist Theory, Cyborgs and Cyberspace

== See also ==
- Adolescent sexuality
- Antisexualism
- Human female sexuality
- Human male sexuality
- Neuroscience and sexual orientation
- Sexology
- Sociosexuality
