= De figuris Veneris =

Anthology of ancient Greek and ancient Roman writings on erotic topics

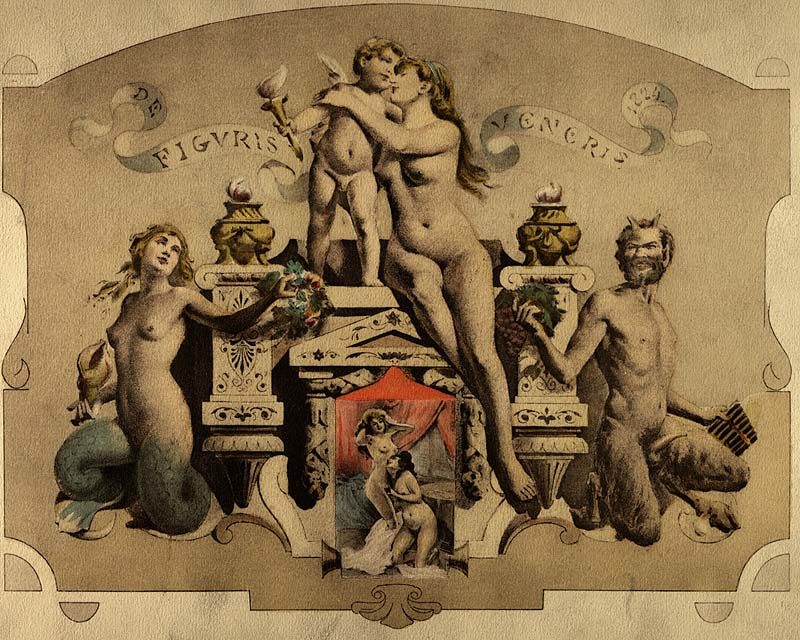
- Cover of De figuris Veneris
- Author: Friedrich Karl Forberg
- Illustrator: Édouard-Henri Avril
- Cover artist: Édouard-Henri Avril
- Language: Latin and Greek translated to German, English, French, Spanish
- Publication date: 1824
- Publication place: Germany

De figuris Veneris (On the figures of Venus) is an anthology of ancient Greek and ancient Roman writings on erotic topics, discussed objectively and classified and grouped by subject matter. It was first published by the German classicist Friedrich Karl Forberg in 1824 in Latin and Greek as a commentary to Antonio Beccadelli's (1394–1471) Hermaphroditus (commonly referred to as Antonii Panormitae Hermaphroditus), an erotic poem sequence of 1425 in Renaissance Latin, though it was later also published as a separate work.

Forberg's work was later also translated into English in 1899 and published by Charles Carrington as De figuris Veneris, Manual of classical erotology, and again in 1907 by Charles Hirsch, and into French, German and Spanish. The French edition by Alcide Bonneau was titled Manuel d’érotologie classique. One French edition of 1906 was illustrated by Édouard-Henri Avril, which concludes with a list of 95 sexual positions. Most of the editions were restricted to high society or censored; one of the copies edited in France was immediately deposited on the secret shelves of the Bibliothèque nationale de France. The Spanish translation was titled Manual de erótica clásica.

== In popular culture ==
In Robert A. Heinlein's last novel, To Sail Beyond the Sunset (1987), Dr Ira Johnson uses the book for sexual education. Later, Maureen Johnson does the same.

== Illustrations ==
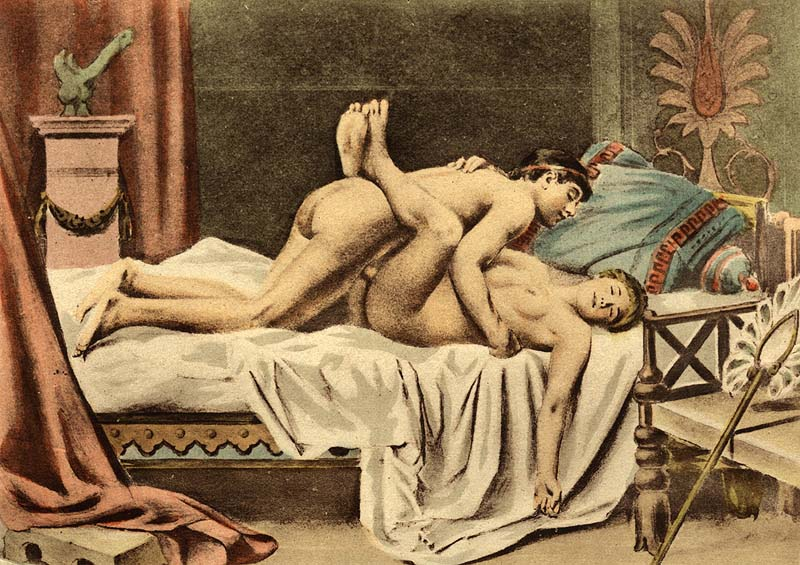
Plate II from "De Figuris Veneris"

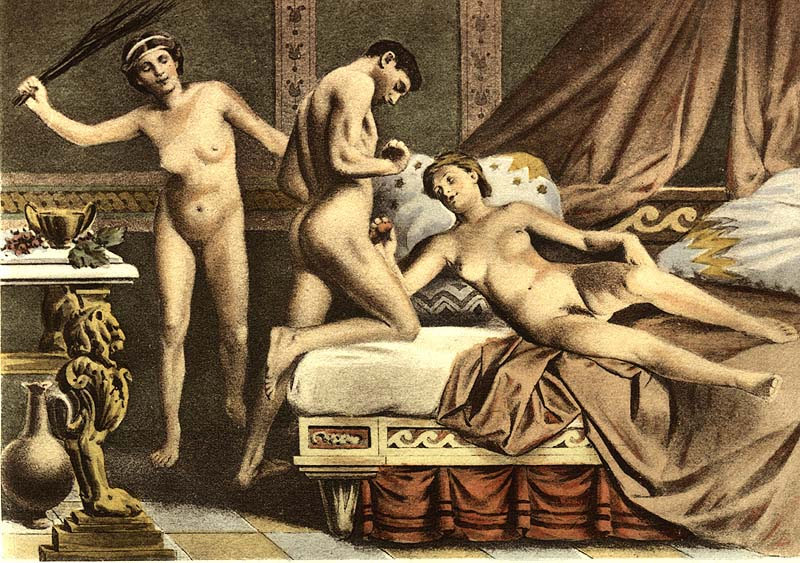
Plate from "De Figuris Veneris"

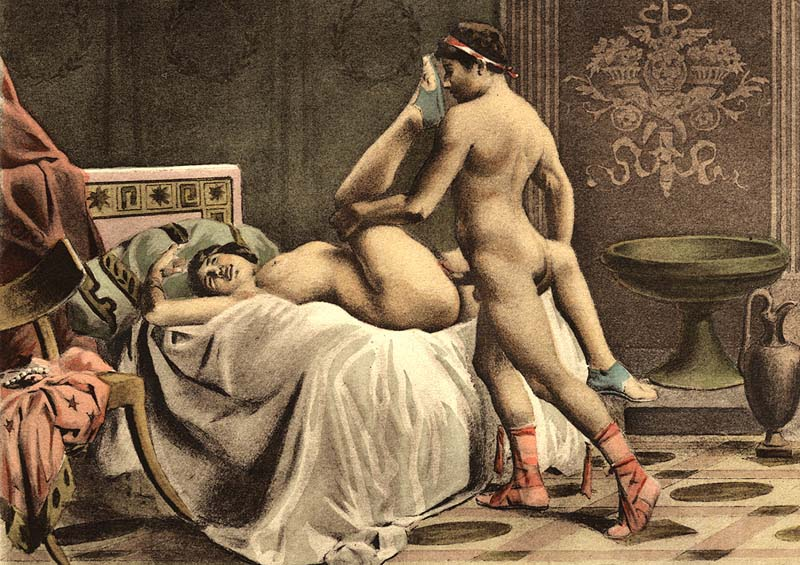
Plate I from "De Figuris Veneris"

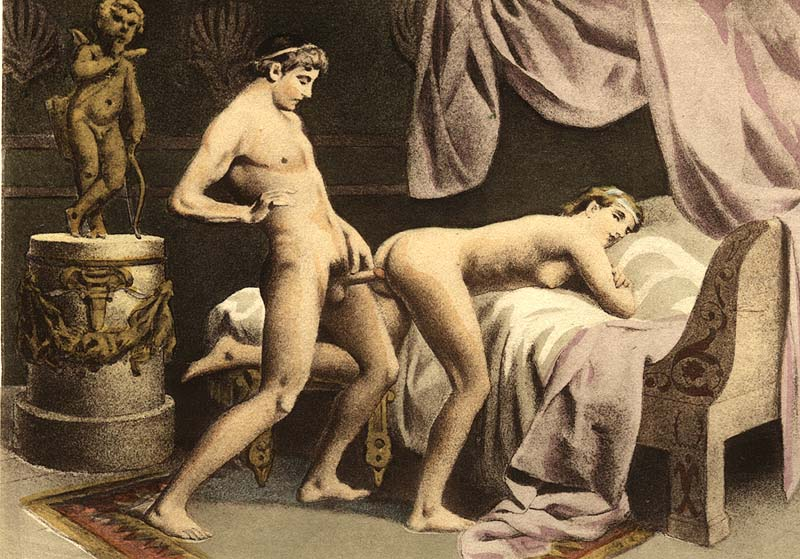
Plate VI: "Aloisio then bends over my butt-cheeks, brings the javelin close to the rear gate, he pushes, he strikes, then, with a violent effort, he sticks it in."

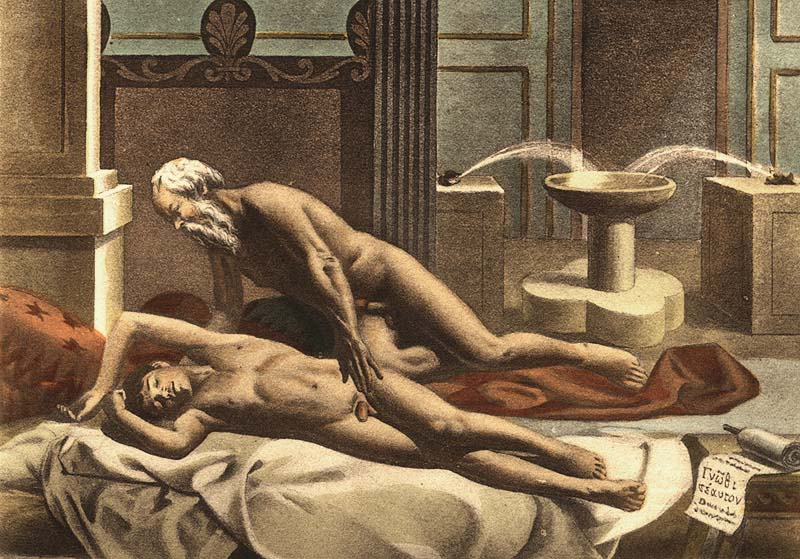
Socrates and Alcibiades

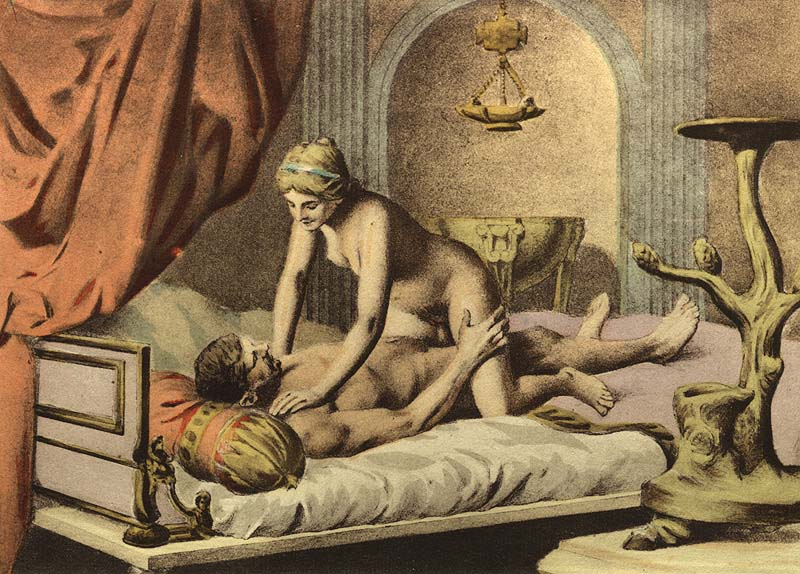
Plate from "De Figuris Veneris"

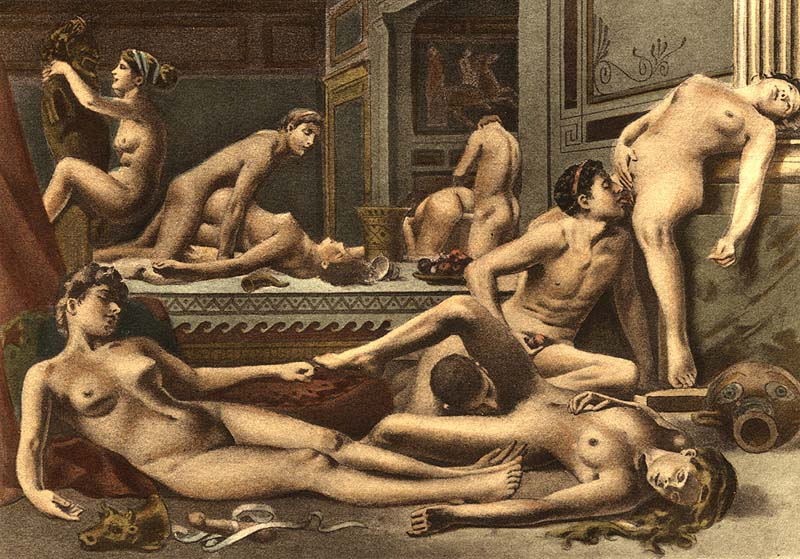
Plate from "De Figuris Veneris"

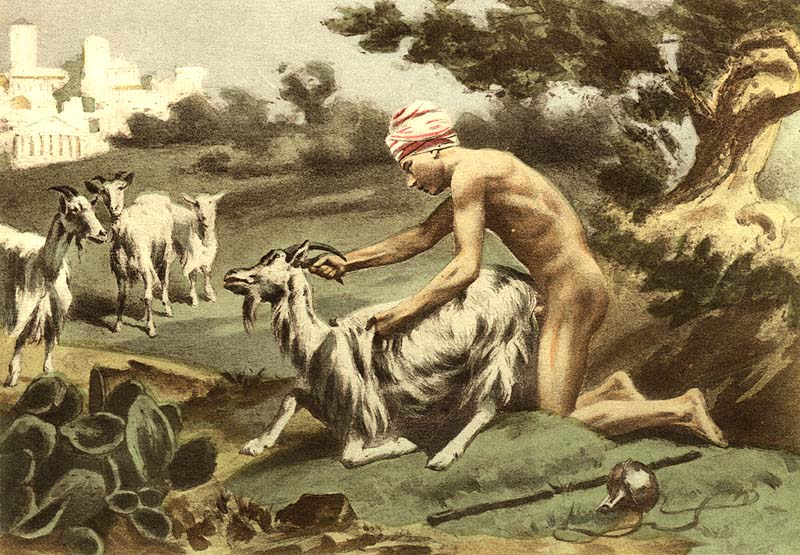
Plate XVII from "De Figuris Veneris"

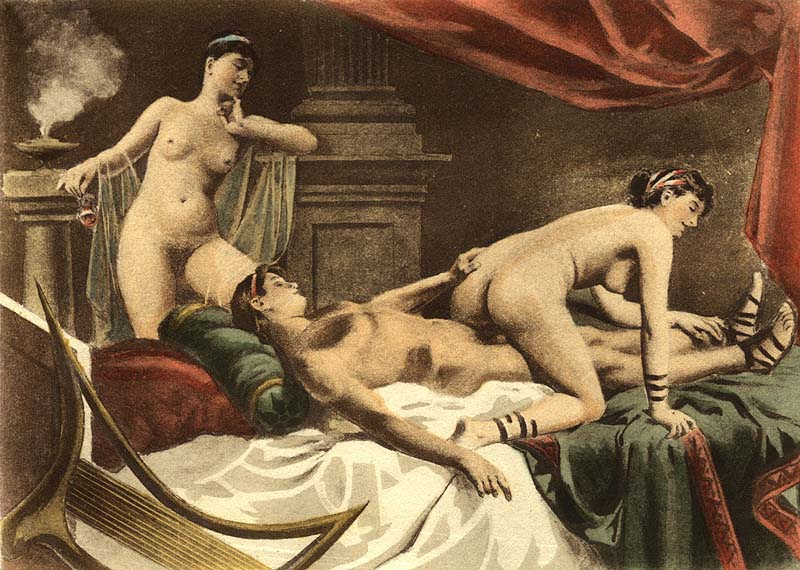
Plate from "De Figuris Veneris"

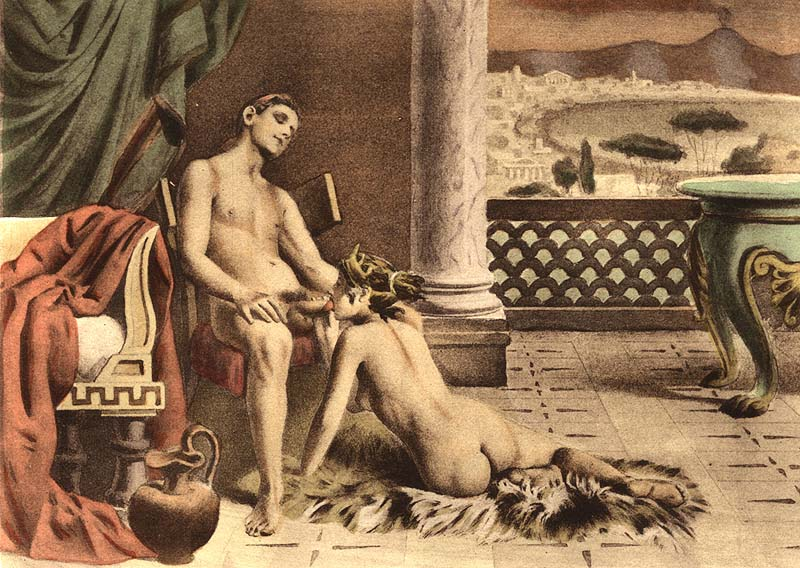
Plate from "De Figuris Veneris"

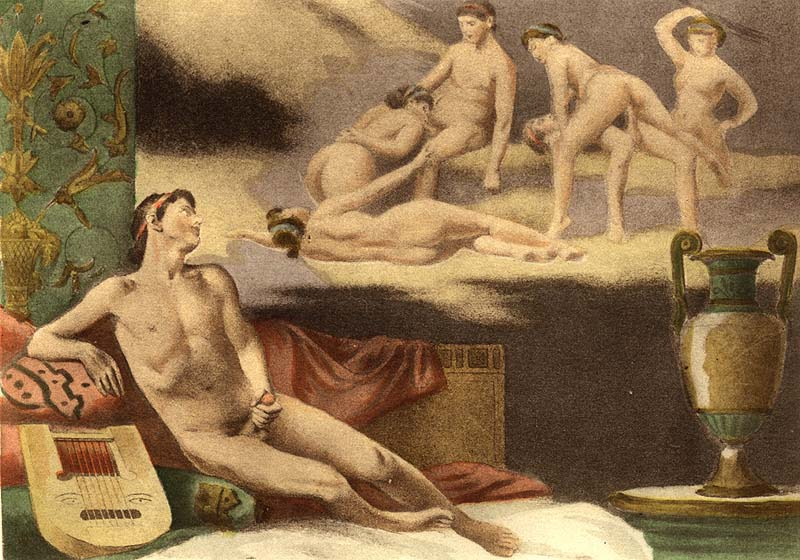
Plate XI from "De Figuris Veneris"

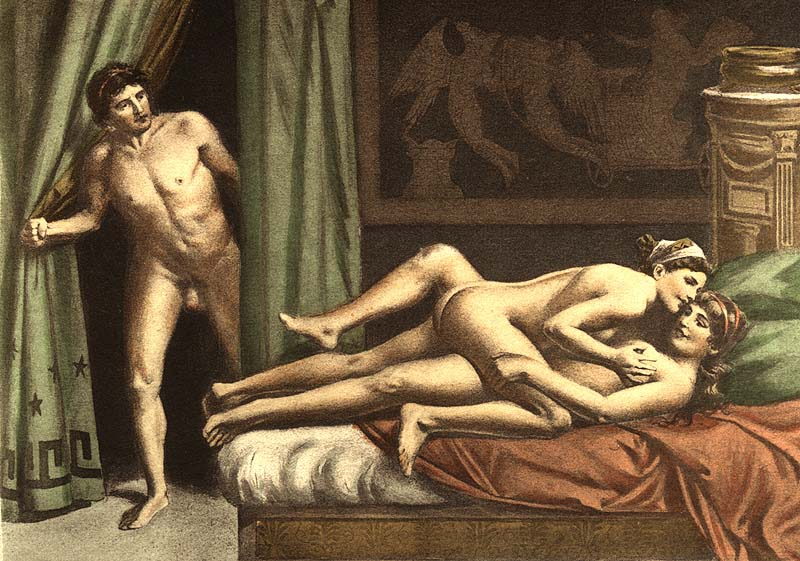
Plate XV from "De Figuris Veneris"

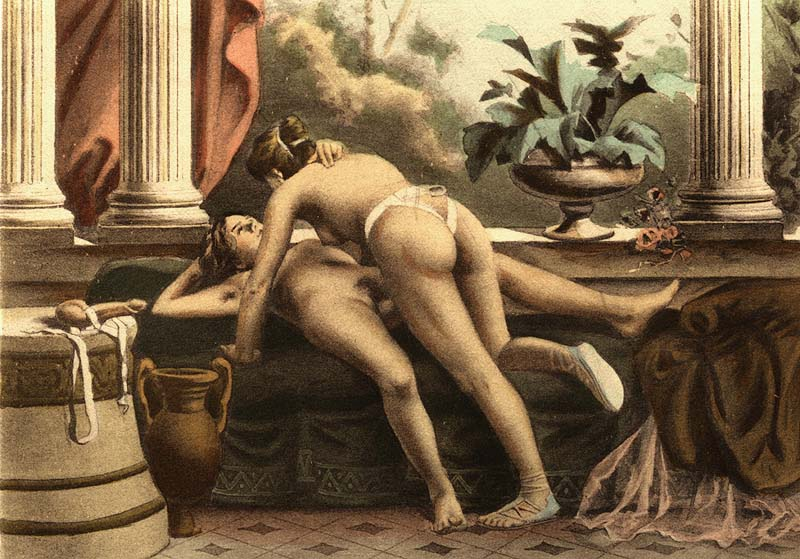
Plate from "De Figuris Veneris"

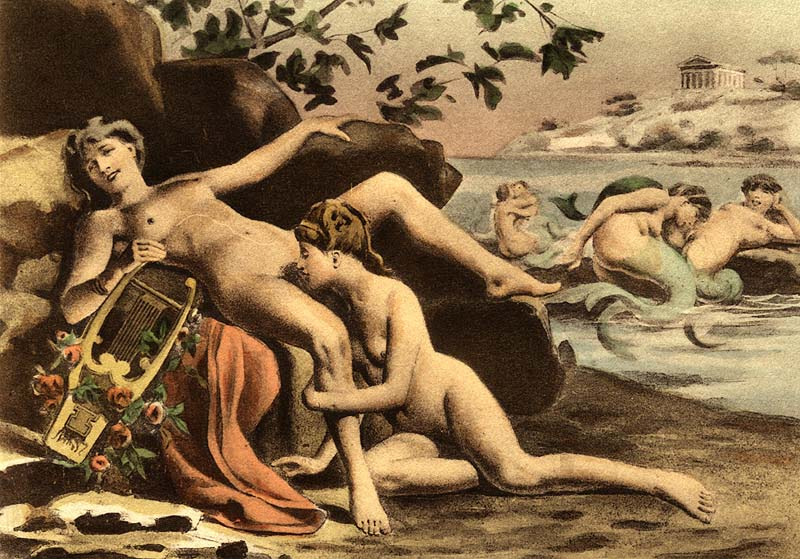
Sappho having sex with her lover (girlfriend) on the beaches of Lesbos, as mermaids play in the background.

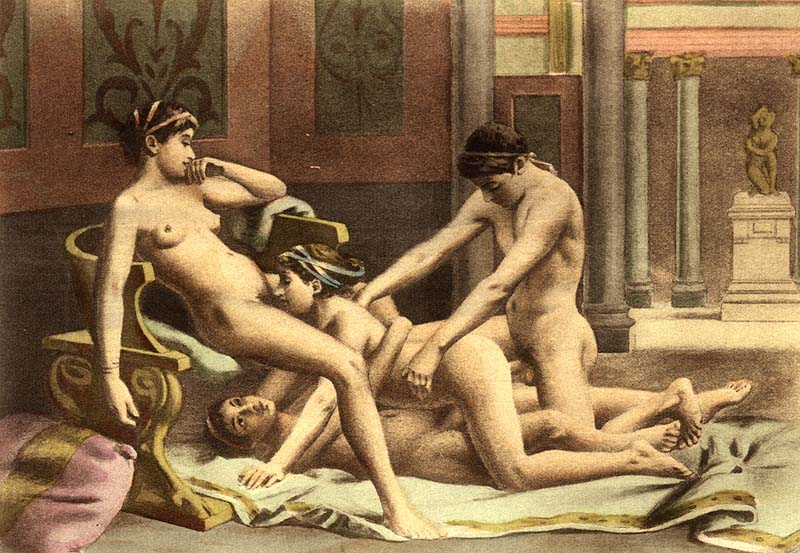
Plate from "De Figuris Veneris"

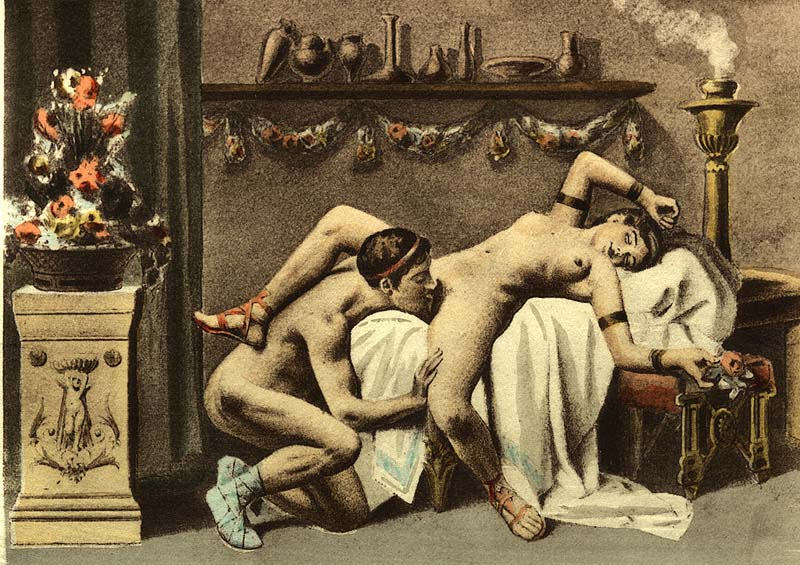
Plate from "De Figuris Veneris"

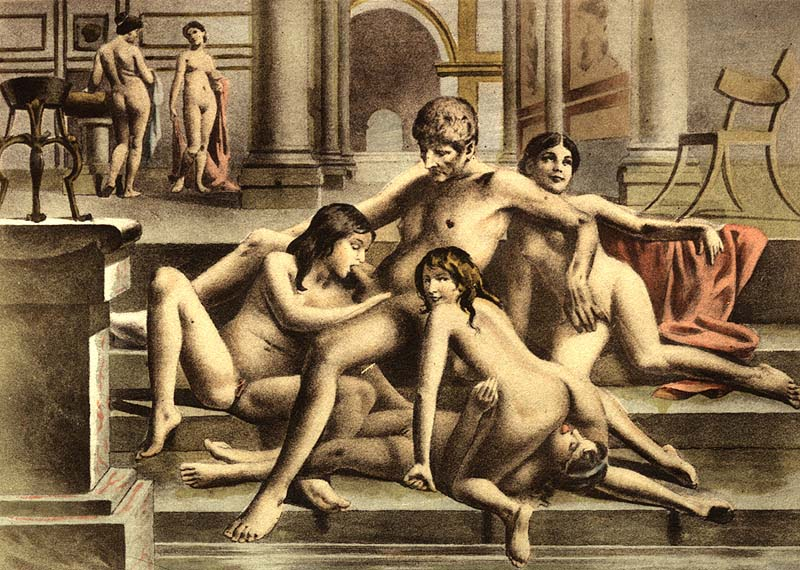
Plate X from "De Figuris Veneris"

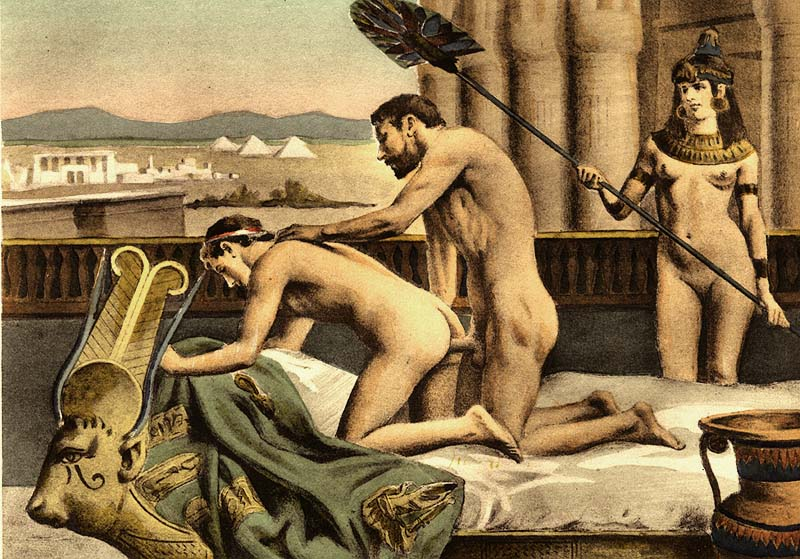
Hadrian and Antinous in Egypt. Plate VII from "De Figuris Veneris"

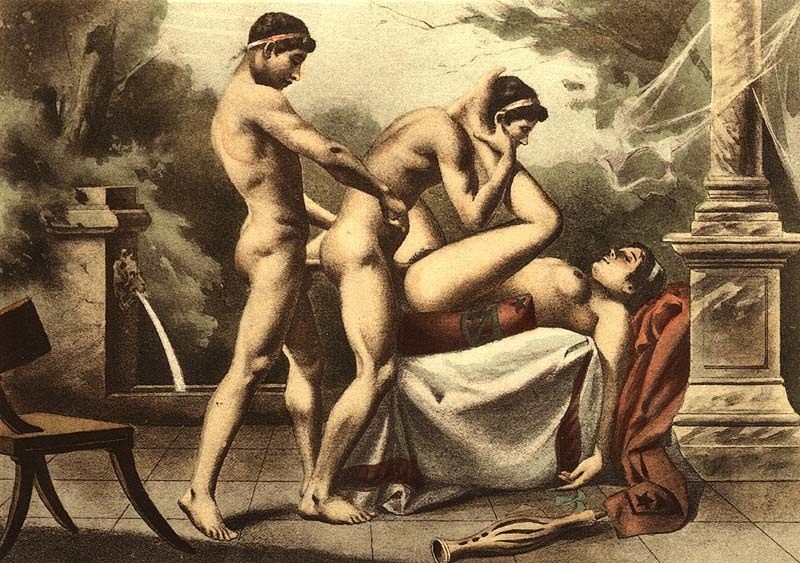
Plate XVIII from "De Figuris Veneris"

== Bibliography ==
- Antonii Panormitae Hermaphroditus, Friedrich Karl Forberg (a cura di), Goburgi, sumtibus Meuseliorum, 1824, pp. 205 ff.
- Manual of classical erotology (de figuris Veneris), Manchester, Julian Smithson M. A. and friends, 1884.
