= Erotophilia =

Measure of openness to one's sexuality

Erotophilia is a personality trait which assesses an individual's disposition to respond to sexual cues in either a positive or negative manner; it is measured on a continuous scale, ranging from erotophobia to erotophilia.

Erotophilic individuals tend to masturbate and fantasize more frequently, think about sex more often, have sexual intercourse for the first time at an earlier age, have more past sexual experiences and have a greater number of intercourse partners than erotophobic individuals. Female erotophiles are also more likely to engage in breast self-examinations, schedule regular gynecological visits, and engage in preventive behaviors regarding sexually transmitted infections (e.g., more frequent condom use).

Erotophobic people tend to score higher on authoritarianism and the need for achievement, have more traditional sex roles, experience more sex guilt and have more negative reactions to masturbation and homosexuality than erotophiles.

== Background ==
This dimension of personality is used to assess openness to sex and sexuality. It is an important dimension to measure because of the health and safety risks associated with poor sexual education. Research on this personality dimension has shown a correlation between erotophilia and a more consistent use of contraception, as well as a greater knowledge about human sexuality. The word erotophilia is derived from the name of Eros, the Greek god of romantic love, and philia (φιλία), an ancient Greek word for love. Researchers occasionally use the term "sex-positive" interchangeably with erotophilia and "sex-negative" interchangeably with erotophobia.

== See also ==
- Hypersexuality
- Libertine
- Promiscuity
- Sex-positive movement
- Sexual addiction
- Sexual ethics
- Sexual norm
- Sociosexual orientation
