= Édouard-Henri Avril =

French artist (1849–1928)

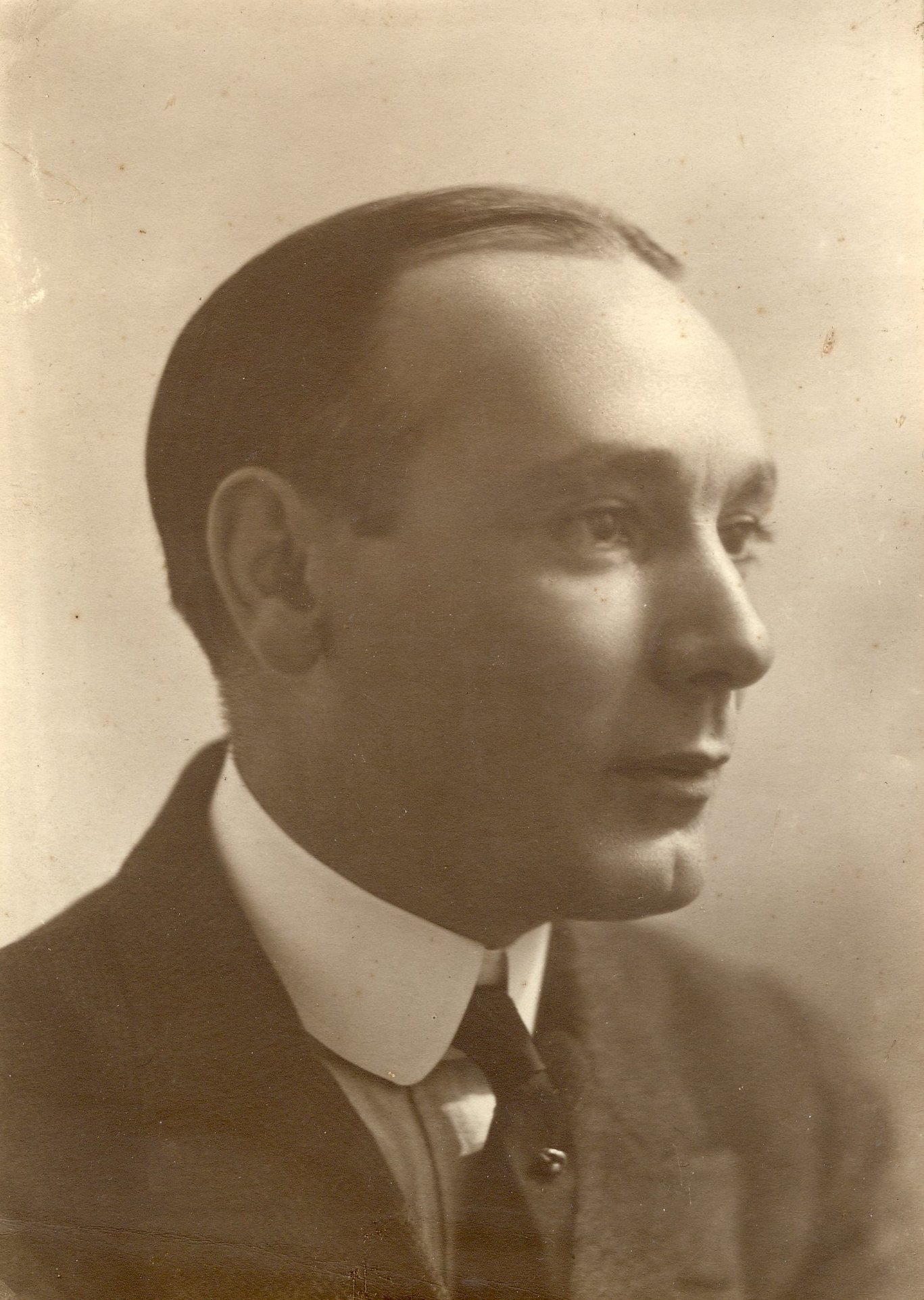
- Portrait of Avril (c. 1885)
- Born: 21 May 1849; Algiers, French Algeria
- Died: 28 July 1928 (aged 79); Le Raincy near Paris, France
- Education: École des Beaux-Arts
- Known for: Illustrator of erotic literature
- Notable work: De figuris Veneris, Fortunio
- Awards: Legion of Honour

Édouard-Henri Avril (French: [avʁil]; 21 May 1849 – 28 July 1928) was a French painter and commercial artist. Under the pseudonym Paul Avril, he was an illustrator of erotic literature. Avril was a soldier before starting his career in art; he was awarded the Legion of Honour for his actions in the Franco-Prussian War.

== Life ==
Avril was born in Algiers. His father was a colonel of the gendarmerie. Avril himself fought and was wounded in the Franco-Prussian War before starting his studies in art. He was awarded with the Legion of Honour on 31 May 1871 for injuries sustained during the war, which resulted in retirement from his military career on 23 January 1872. Biographical material of his life is scarce due to the perceived obscene nature of his work and because he worked under a pseudonym of "Paul Avril". His pseudonym can lead to a confusion with his brother, who was named Paul-Victor Avril and was also an artist and worked as an engraver.

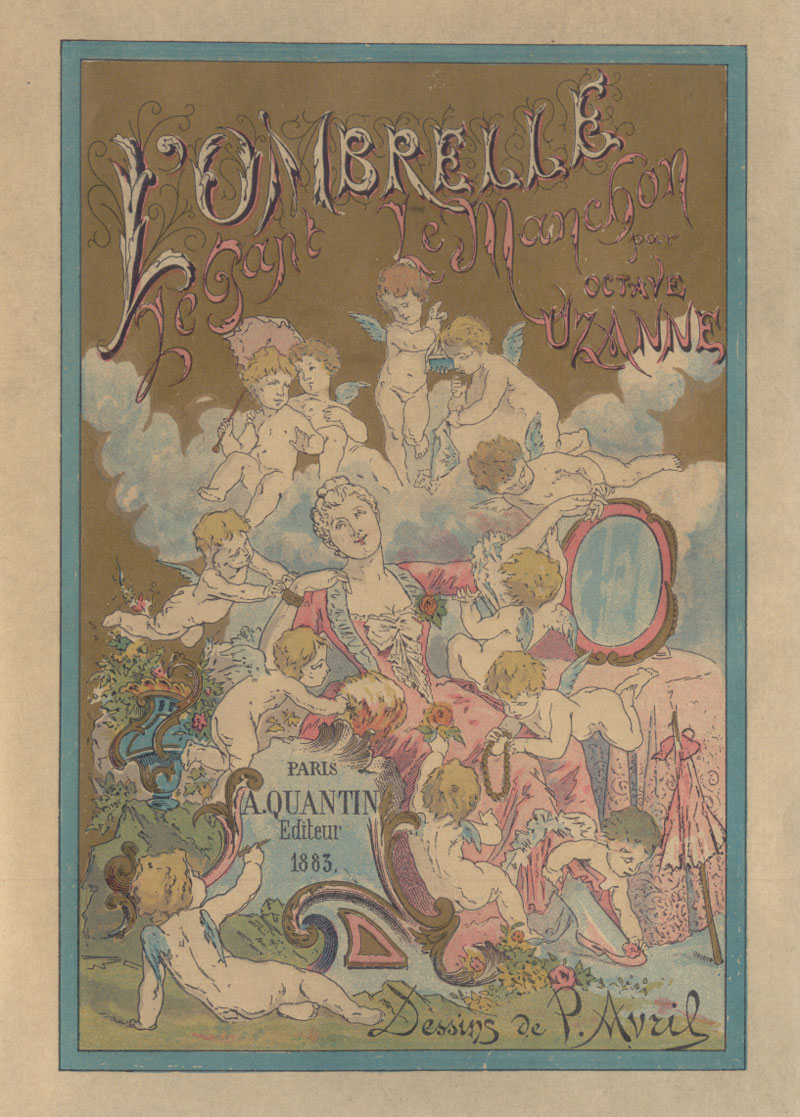
Cover of L'Ombrelle - Le Gant - Le Manchon illustrated by Avril (1883)

From 1874 to 1878, Avril was at the École des Beaux-Arts in Paris. He worked for the illustrated newsmagazine Le Monde illustré in 1882. Having been commissioned to illustrate Théophile Gautier's novel Fortunio, he adopted the pseudonym "Paul Avril". His reputation was soon established, and he received many commissions to illustrate both major authors and the "galante literature" of the day, a form of erotica; however his reputation as a commercial illustrator of novels was established before he began illustrating the more underground erotic literature. These books were typically sold in small editions on a subscription basis organised by collectors. Erotica of that time received very limited prints and sometimes were limited to only about 100 copies or were sold only within exclusive circles of collectors. Because of the perceived obscenity of Avril and his works, it is difficult to assess the impact that his art might have had on the culture of the time. Avril died at Le Raincy near Paris in 1928.

== Works ==
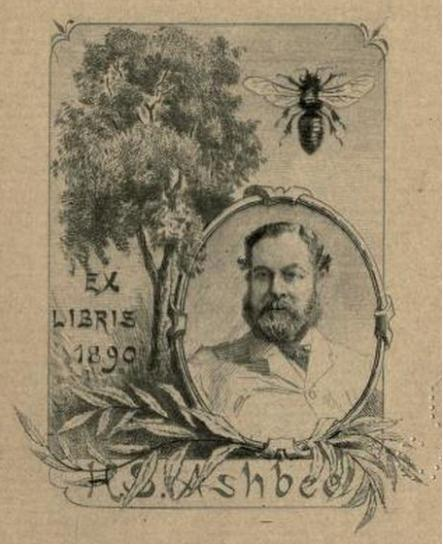
Bookplate designed by Avril for erotica collector Henry Spencer Ashbee

Avril's major work were the illustrations in 1906 for De Figuris Veneris: A Manual of Classical Erotica. Avril also illustrated John Cleland's Fanny Hill (also known as Memoirs of a Woman of Pleasure), which was a significant and controversial publication of its time as it was the first novel to bring erotica to English literature. The book's edition that Avril illustrated includes Les charmes de Fanny exposés, which is one of his better-known pictures. He illustrated works including Gustave Flaubert's Salammbô, Gautier's Le Roi Caundale, Jean Baptiste Louvet de Couvray's Adventures of the Chevalier de Faublas, Mario Uchard's Mon Oncle Barbassou (scenes in a harem), Jules Michelet's The Madam, Hector France's Musk, Hashish and Blood, the writings of Pietro Aretino, and the anonymous lesbian novel Gamiani.

Classicizing works illustrated by Avril include Oeuvres d’Horace (1887), Une nuit de Cléopâtre (1894), Daphnis et Chloé (1898), and Les sonnets luxurieux de l’Aretin (1904). Avril might be best known for his sapphic illustrations. Prolific erotica collector Henry Spencer Ashbee commissioned Avril to design a bookplate for him. Avril worked with Octave Uzanne, who after, leaving the Société des Amis des Livres which he found too conservative and too concerned with the reissue of old works, started two new bibliographic societies. The Société des Bibliophiles Contemporaines (1889–1894) consisted of 160 people from literary circles, including Avril.

== List of works and editions illustrated ==
- L'Éventail (1882)
- L'Ombrelle – Le Gant – Le Manchon (1883)
- Fortunio (1883)
- Adventures of the Chevalier de Faublas (1884)
- Mon Oncle Barbassou (Scenes in a Harem) (1884)
- Fanny Hill (French: 1887, English: 1906)
- Oeuvres d’Horace (1887)
- The Mirror of the World (1888)
- Le Roi Candaule (1893)
- Une nuit de Cléopâtre (1894)
- The Life and Adventures of Father Silas (1896)
- Daphnis et Chloé (1898)
- Musk, Hashish and Blood (1899)
- Les Sonnets Luxurieux de l’Aretin (1904)
- Gamiani (1905)
- De Figuris Veneris: A Manual of Classical Erotica (1906)
- Salammbô (1906)
- Histoire de Saturnin (1908)
- The Madam

== See also ==
- John Martin
- Louis Legrand
- Martin van Maële
- L'Origine du monde by Gustave Courbet
