= Timeline of German idealism =

The following is a list of the major events in the history of German idealism, along with related historical events.

== Events ==
=== Background ===
- 1623 Jakob Böhme, The Way to Christ (see: Behmenism)
- 1641 René Descartes, Meditations on First Philosophy (see: Rationalism, Cartesianism)
- 1677 Spinoza, Ethics (see: Spinozism, Philosophy of Spinoza)
- 1686 Leibniz, Discourse on Metaphysics
- 1687 Newton, Mathematical Principles of Natural Philosophy
- 1690 Locke, An Essay Concerning Human Understanding (see: British Empiricism)
- 1710 Berkeley, Three Dialogues between Hylas and Philonous (see: Subjective idealism)
- 1732 Wolff, Elementa matheseos universae (influenced Kant)
- 1748 Hume, An Enquiry Concerning Human Understanding
- 1759 Hamann, Socratic Memorabilia (see: Counter-Enlightenment)
- 1762 Rousseau, Emile, or On Education (see: Age of Enlightenment)
- 1767 Mendelssohn, Phaedon (important source for Kant's view of Plato)

=== 1770–1800 ===
- 1770 Kant, inaugural dissertation
- 1781
  - Kant, Critique of Pure Reason (see: Transcendental idealism)
  - Death of Lessing
- 1783 Kant, Prolegomena to Any Future Metaphysics
- 1784 Kant, "Idea for a Universal History with a Cosmopolitan Purpose" (November) and "Answering the Question: What Is Enlightenment?" (December)
- 1785
  - Jacobi, Letters on the Teachings of Spinoza
    - Work including unauthorized publication of Goethe's poem "Prometheus" (see: Pantheism controversy, Sturm und Drang)
  - Kant, Groundwork of the Metaphysics of Morals
- 1786 Reinhold, Letters on the Kantian Philosophy
- 1787
  - Second edition of Kant's Critique of Pure Reason
  - Jacobi, David Hume on Faith, or Idealism and Realism
  - Goethe, Iphigenia in Tauris (see: Weimar Classicism)
- 1788 Kant, Critique of Practical Reason
- 1789
  - French Revolution begins
  - Second, expanded edition of Jacobi's Letters on the Teachings of Spinoza
- 1790
  - Kant, Critique of Judgment
  - Maimon, Essay on Transcendental Philosophy
  - Goethe, Metamorphosis of Plants
- 1792
  - Fichte, Attempt at a Critique of All Revelation
  - Schulze, Aenesidemus
- 1793 Kant, Religion within the Limits of Reason Alone
- 1794 Fichte, Aenesidemus Review and Foundations of the Science of Knowledge
- 1795 Schiller, On the Aesthetic Education of Man
- 1797
  - Fichte, Foundations of Natural Right
  - Kant, Metaphysics of Morals
  - "The Oldest Systematic Program of German Idealism" (unsigned and unpublished essay written by Hegel, Schelling, and/or Hölderlin)
  - Schelling, Ideas for a Philosophy of Nature (see: Naturphilosophie)
- 1798 Schelling, On the World Soul
- 1799
  - Napoleon overthrows the French Directory
  - Jacobi, Letter to Fichte (see: Atheism dispute)
  - Schleiermacher, On Religion (see: German Romanticism, Hermeneutics)
  - Schelling, First Plan of a System of the Philosophy of Nature

=== 1800–1830 ===
- 1800
  - Schelling, System of Transcendental Idealism
  - Fichte, The Vocation of Man
- 1801 Hegel, The Difference Between Fichte's and Schelling's Systems of Philosophy
- 1804 Death of Kant
- 1807 Hegel, The Phenomenology of Spirit (see: Absolute idealism)
- 1808 Goethe, Faust: The First Part of the Tragedy
- 1809 Schelling, Philosophical Inquiries into the Essence of Human Freedom
- 1810 Goethe, Theory of Colours
- 1811 Jacobi, Of Divine Things and Their Revelation (criticized Schelling)
- 1812 Hegel, Science of Logic part one ('The Objective Logic', part 1)
- 1813 Hegel, Science of Logic part two ('The Objective Logic', part 2)
- 1814
  - Death of Fichte
  - Defeat of Napoleon; Bourbon Restoration
- 1815 Schelling, On the Divinities of Samothrace (see: Winged Victory of Samothrace)
- 1816 Hegel, Science of Logic part three ('The Subjective Logic')
- 1817
  - Hegel, Encyclopedia of the Philosophical Sciences
  - Coleridge, Biographia Literaria (discusses Kant, Fichte, Schelling in English)
- 1818 Schopenhauer, The World as Will and Representation
- 1820 Hegel, Elements of the Philosophy of Right
- 1825 Herbart, Psychology as Science

=== 1830s–1860s ===
- 1830 Revolutions of 1830
- 1831 Death of Hegel
- 1832
  - Goethe, Faust: The Second Part of the Tragedy
  - Death of Goethe
- 1833 Karl Daub, The Dogmatic Theology of the Present Time (see: Right Hegelians)
- 1834
  - Carlyle, Sartor Resartus (English novel which parodied German idealism)
  - Schelling's first public critique of Hegel is published in an introduction to a work by Victor Cousin
- 1835
  - Strauss, The Life of Jesus (see: Young Hegelians)
  - Heine, On the History of Religion and Philosophy in Germany
  - Hegel's posthumously published Lectures on Aesthetics
- 1837
  - Schopenhauer, On the Basis of Morality
  - Hegel's Lectures on the Philosophy of History
- 1839 Schopenhauer, On the Freedom of the Will
- 1841
  - Schelling's Berlin lectures are attended by Søren Kierkegaard, Mikhail Bakunin, Jacob Burckhardt, Alexander von Humboldt, and Friedrich Engels
  - Kierkegaard, On the Concept of Irony with Continual Reference to Socrates (critiques Fichte, Schlegel, and Hegel)
  - Feuerbach, The Essence of Christianity
- 1842 Bruno Bauer, Hegel's Teachings on Religion and Art
- 1843
  - Trendelenburg, The Logical Question in Hegel's System
  - Marx, Critique of Hegel's Philosophy of Right (unpublished until after Marx's death)
  - Lotze, Logic
- 1844
  - Second expanded edition of Schopenhauer's The World as Will and Representation
  - Marx and Engels, The Holy Family criticized the Young Hegelians
- 1846 Marx and Engels, The German Ideology (unpublished until 1932) criticized the Young Hegelians
- 1848 Revolutions of 1848
- 1851 Schopenhauer, Parerga and Paralipomena
- 1854 Death of Schelling

=== Later ===
- 1860 Death of Schopenhauer
- 1865
  - Stirling, The Secret of Hegel: Being the Hegelian System in Origin Principle, Form and Matter (see: British idealism)
  - Lange, History of Materialism and Critique of its Present Importance (neo-Kantian work)
- 1874 Nietzsche, Schopenhauer as Educator
- 1885 Josiah Royce, The Religious Aspect of Philosophy (see: Objective idealism)
- 1903 G. E. Moore, "The Refutation of Idealism" (see: Analytic philosophy)
- 1907 Benedetto Croce, What is Living and What is Dead in the Philosophy of Hegel
- 1912 Paul Tillich, Mysticism and Guilt-Consciousness in Schelling's Philosophical Development (see: Christian existentialism)
- 1916 Giovanni Gentile, The Theory of Mind as Pure Act (see: Actual idealism)
- 1917 Franz Rosenzweig, "The Oldest Systematic Program of German Idealism" (first publication of the Lost 1797 unsigned document)
- 1929 Heidegger, Kant and the Problem of Metaphysics
- 1936 Heidegger, Schelling's Treatise: On the Essence of Human Freedom
- 1945 Popper, The Open Society and Its Enemies (criticized Hegel's historicism as totalitarian)
- 1947
  - Jean Hyppolite, The Genesis and Structure of the Phenomenology of Spirit
  - Alexandre Kojève, Introduction to the Reading of Hegel: Lectures on Phenomenology of Spirit
- 1948 Lukács, The Young Hegel
- 1955 Walter Kaufmann, Hegel: A Reinterpretation
- 1963 Adorno, Hegel: Three Studies (see: Frankfurt School)
- 1966 P. F. Strawson, The Bounds of Sense: An Essay on Immanuel Kant’s Critique of Pure Reason (see: Ordinary language philosophy)
- 1974 Derrida, Glas (see: Deconstruction, Post-structuralism)
- 1975 Charles Taylor, Hegel
- 1992 Francis Fukuyama, The End of History and the Last Man

== See also ==
- Objective idealism
- Georg Wilhelm Friedrich Hegel bibliography
- Johann Wolfgang von Goethe bibliography
- Transcendentalism
- Hegelianism
- Kantianism
- Neo-Kantianism
