= Timeline of Western philosophers =

Timeline of Eastern | Western philosophers

This is a list of philosophers from the Western tradition of philosophy.

== Western philosophers ==
=== Ancient Greece ===
==== 600–500 BC ====
- Thales of Miletus (c. 624 – 546 BC). Of the Milesian school. Believed that all was made of water.
- Pherecydes of Syros (c. 620 – c. 550 BC). Cosmologist.
- Anaximander of Miletus (c. 610 – 546 BC). Of the Milesian school. Famous for the concept of Apeiron, or "the boundless".
- Anaximenes of Miletus (c. 585 – 525 BC). Of the Milesian school. Believed that all was made of air.
- Pythagoras of Samos (c. 580 – c. 500 BC). Of the Ionian School. Believed the deepest reality to be composed of numbers, and that souls are immortal.
- Xenophanes of Colophon (c. 570 – 480 BC). Advocated monotheism. Sometimes associated with the Eleatic school.
- Heraclitus of Ephesus (c. 535 – c. 475 BC). Of the Ionians. Emphasized the mutability of the universe.
- Epicharmus of Kos (c. 530 – 450 BC). Comic playwright and moralist.
- Parmenides of Elea (c. 515 – 450 BC). Of the Eleatics. Reflected on the concept of Being.
- Anaxagoras of Clazomenae (c. 500 – 428 BC). Of the Ionians. Pluralist.

==== 400 BC ====
- Empedocles (492 – 432 BC). Eclectic cosmogonist. Pluralist.
- Zeno of Elea (c. 490 – 430 BC). Of the Eleatics. Known for his paradoxes.
- Gorgias. (c. 483 – 375 BC). Sophist. Early advocate of solipsism.
- Protagoras of Abdera (c. 481 – 420 BC). Sophist. Early advocate of relativism.
- Leucippus of Miletus (First half of the 5th century BC). Founding Atomist, Determinist.
- Socrates of Athens (c. 470 – 399 BC). Emphasized virtue ethics. In epistemology, understood dialectic to be central to the pursuit of truth.
- Prodicus of Ceos (c. 465 – c. 395 BC). Sophist.
- Critias of Athens (c. 460 – 413 BC). Atheist writer and politician.
- Hippias (Middle of the 5th century BC). Sophist.
- Democritus of Abdera (c. 450 – 370 BC). Founding Atomist.
- Melissus of Samos. (c. 470 - 430 BC). Eleatic.
- Cratylus. Follower of Heraclitus.
- Antisthenes (c. 444 – 365 BC). Founder of Cynicism. Pupil of Socrates.
- Aristippus of Cyrene (c. 440 – 366 BC). A Cyrenaic. Advocate of ethical hedonism.
- Xenophon (c. 427 – 355 BC). Historian.
- Plato (c. 427 – 347 BC). Famed for view of the transcendental forms. Advocated polity governed by philosophers.
- Diogenes of Apollonia (c. 425 – c 350 BC). Cosmologist.
- Speusippus (c. 408 – 339 BC). Nephew of Plato.
- Eudoxus of Cnidus (c. 408 – 355 BC). Pupil of Plato.
- Diogenes of Sinope (c. 404 – 323 BC). Cynic.

=== Hellenistic era ===
==== 300–200 BC ====
- Xenocrates (c. 396 – 314 BC). Disciple of Plato.
- Aristotle (c. 384 – 322 BC). A polymath whose works ranged across all philosophical fields.
- Theophrastus (c. 371 – c. 287 BC). Peripatetic.
- Pyrrho of Elis (c. 360 – 270 BC). Skeptic.
- Epicurus (c. 341 – 270 BC). Materialist Atomist, hedonist. Founder of Epicureanism
- Strato of Lampsacus (c. 340 – c. 268 BC). Atheist, Materialist.
- Zeno of Citium (c. 333 – 264 BC). Founder of Stoicism.
- Aristarchus of Samos (c. 310 – c. 230 BC). Astronomer.
- Euclid (fl. 300 BC). Mathematician, founder of geometry.
- Archimedes (c. 287 – c. 212 BC). Mathematician and inventor.
- Chrysippus of Soli (c. 280 – 207 BC). Major figure in Stoicism.
- Eratosthenes (c. 276 BC – c. 195/194 BC). Geographer and mathematician.
- Carneades (c. 214 – 129 BC). Academic skeptic. Understood probability as the purveyor of truth.
- Hipparchus of Nicaea (c. 190 – c. 120 BC). Astronomer and mathematician, founder of trigonometry.

=== Classical Rome ===
==== 100 BC–100 AD ====
- Cicero (c. 106 BC – 43 BC) Skeptic. Political theorist.
- Lucretius (c. 99 BC – 55 BC). Epicurean.
- Philo (c. 13 BC – AD 54). Believed in the allegorical method of reading texts.
- Seneca the Younger (c. 4 BC – AD 65). Stoic.
- Jesus of Nazareth (died c. AD 34) the founding figure of Christianity.
- Hero of Alexandria (c. 10 – c. 75). Engineer.
- Quintilian (c. 35 – c. 100). Rhetorician and teacher.
- Plutarch (c. 46 – 119).
- Epictetus (c. 55 – 135). Stoic. Emphasized ethics of self–determination.

==== 100–400 ====
- Marcus Aurelius (121 – 180). Stoic.
- Sextus Empiricus (fl. during the 2nd and possibly the 3rd centuries AD). Skeptic, Pyrrhonist.
- Origen (c. 185 – 254). Christian Platonist.
- Plotinus (c. 205 – 270). Neoplatonist. Had a holistic metaphysics.
- Porphyry (c. 232 – 304). Student of Plotinus.
- Iamblichus of Syria (c. 245 – 325). Late neoplatonist. Espoused theurgy.
- Gregory of Nyssa (c.335 – 394). Christian Neoplatonist. Criticized slavery on philosophical grounds.
- Hypatia of Alexandria (c. 360 – March 415). Late neoplatonist, astronomer, and mathematician.
- Augustine of Hippo (c. 354 – 430). Neoplatonist. Original Sin. Church father.
- Proclus (c. 412 – 485). Neoplatonist.
- Boethius (c. 480–524).
- John Philoponus (c. 490–570).

=== Middle Ages ===
==== 500–900 ====
- Pseudo-Dionysius the Areopagite (c. 500).
- Isidore of Seville (c. 560–636). Christian philosopher.
- John of Damascus (c. 680-750).
- Alcuin (c. 735 – 804). Early Scholastic.
- Al-Kindi (c. 801 – 873). Major figure in Islamic philosophy. Influenced by Neoplatonism.
- Abbas ibn Firnas (809–887). Polymath.
- John the Scot (c. 815 – 877). neoplatonist, pantheist.
- al-Faràbi (c. 870 – 950). Major Islamic philosopher. Neoplatonist.
- al-Razi (c. 865 – 925). Rationalist. Major Islamic philosopher. Held that God creates universe by rearranging pre–existing laws.
- Saadia Gaon (c. 882 – 942). Jewish Philosopher
- Al-Biruni (c. 973 – 1050). Islamic polymath.
- Ibn Sina (Avicenna) (c. 980–1037). Islamic philosopher.
- Ibn Hazm (7 November 994 – 15 August 1064)

==== 1000–1100 ====
- Ibn Gabirol (Avicebron) (c. 1021–1058). Jewish philosopher.
- Anselm (c. 1034–1109). Christian philosopher. Produced ontological argument for the existence of God.
- Omar Khayyam (c. 1048–1131). Islamic philosopher. Agnostic. Mathematician. Philosophical poet, one of the 5 greatest Iranian Poets.
- Al-Ghazali (c. 1058–1111). Islamic philosopher. Mystic.
- Yehudah HaLevi (c. 1075- 1141). Jewish poet, physician and philosopher.
- Peter Abelard (c. 1079–1142). Scholastic philosopher. Dealt with the problem of universals.
- Peter Lombard (c. 1100–1160). Scholastic.
- Ibn Tufail (c. 1105 – 1185)
- Averroes (Ibn Rushd, "The Commentator") (c. 1126–December 10, 1198). Islamic philosopher.
- Maimonides (c. 1135–1204). Jewish philosopher.
- Fakhr al-Din al-Razi (1149 or 1150 – 1209)
- Suhrawardi (c. 1154–1191). Major Islamic philosopher.
- Ibn Arabi (1165–1240). Andalusian Muslim philosopher, mystic, poet, and scholar. Founder of Akbarism, one of the major current of later Islamic philosophy.
- Fibonacci (c. 1170–c. 1250), mathematician.
- Robert Grosseteste (c. 1175–1253).
- Francis of Assisi (c. 1182–1226). Ascetic.
- Albert the Great (Albertus Magnus) (c. 1193–1280). Early Empiricist.

==== 1200–1300 ====
- Roger Bacon (c. 1214–1294). Empiricist, mathematician.
- Thomas Aquinas (c. 1221–1274). Aristotelian, Major Catholic theologian and philosopher.
- Bonaventure (c. 1225–1274). Franciscan.
- Ramon Llull (c. 1232–1315) Spanish philosopher
- Meister Eckhart (c. 1260–1328). mystic.
- Ibn Taymiyya (c. 1263-1328) Islamic scholar, jurist and philosopher
- Dante Alighieri (c. 1265 – 1321).
- Duns Scotus (c. 1266–1308). Franciscan, Scholastic, Original Sin.
- Marsilius of Padua (c. 1270–1342). Understood chief function of state as mediator.
- William of Ockham (c. 1288–1348). Franciscan. Scholastic. Nominalist, creator of Ockham's razor.
- Jean Buridan (c. 1300–1358). Nominalist.
- John Wycliffe (c. 1320–1384).
- Nicole Oresme (c. 1320–5 – 1382). Made contributions to economics, science, mathematics, theology and philosophy.
- Ibn Khaldun (1332 – 1406).
- Hasdai Crescas (c. 1340 – c. 1411). Jewish philosopher.
- Gemistus Pletho (c. 1355 – 1452/1454). Late Byzantine scholar of neoplatonic philosophy.

==== 1400 ====
- Nicholas of Cusa (1401–1464). Christian philosopher.
- Lorenzo Valla (1407–1457). Humanist, critic of scholastic logic.
- Marsilio Ficino (1433–1499). Christian Neoplatonist, head of Florentine Academy and major Renaissance Humanist figure. First translator of Plato's complete extant works into Latin.
- Pico della Mirandola (1463–1494). Renaissance humanist.
- Desiderius Erasmus (1466–1536). Humanist, advocate of free will.
- Niccolò Machiavelli (1469–1527). Political realism.
- Nicolaus Copernicus (1473–1543). Scientist, whose works affected Philosophy of Science.
- Sir Thomas More (1478–1535). Humanist, created term "utopia".
- Martin Luther (1483–1546). Founder of Protestantism.

=== Early modern period ===
==== 1500 ====
- John Calvin (1509–1564). Major Western Christian theologian.
- Michel de Montaigne (1533–1592). Humanist, skeptic.
- Giordano Bruno (1548–1600). Advocate of heliocentrism.
- Francisco Suarez (1548–1617). Politically proto–liberal.
- Francis Bacon (1561–1626). Empiricist.
- Galileo Galilei (1564–1642). Heliocentrist.
- Johannes Kepler (1571–1630). Scientist, whose works affected Philosophy of Science.
- Molla-Sadra (1572–1640). Major Islamic philosopher.
- Hugo Grotius (1583–1645). Natural law theorist.
- Marin Mersenne (1588–1648). Cartesian.
- Robert Filmer (1588–1653). Absolutist, monarchist, patrimonialist. Divine right of kings.
- Thomas Hobbes (1588–1679). Advocate of extensive government power, social contract theorist, materialist.
- Pierre Gassendi (1592–1655). Mechanicism. Empiricist.
- René Descartes (1596–1650). Heliocentrism, mind-body dualism, rationalism.

==== 1600 ====
- Baltasar Gracián (1601–1658). Spanish Catholic philosopher
- François de La Rochefoucauld (1613-1680).
- Blaise Pascal (1623–1662). Physicist, scientist. Noted for Pascal's wager.
- Margaret Cavendish (1623–1673). Materialist, feminist.
- Robert Boyle (1627–1691).
- Jacques-Bénigne Bossuet (1627 – 1704).
- Baruch Spinoza (1632–1677). Rationalism.
- Samuel von Pufendorf (1632–1694). Social contract theorist.
- John Locke (1632–1704). Major Empiricist. Political philosopher.
- Nicolas Malebranche (1638–1715). Cartesian.
- Isaac Newton (1643–1727).
- John Flamsteed (1646 – 1719). Astronomer.
- Gottfried Leibniz (1646–1716). Co-inventor of calculus.
- Pierre Bayle (1647–1706). Pyrrhonist.
- Jean Meslier (1664–1729). Atheist Priest.
- Giambattista Vico (1668–1744).
- John Toland (1670–1722).
- Anthony Ashley-Cooper (1671–1713).
- Dimitrie Cantemir (1674-1723)
- Christian Wolff (1679–1754). Determinist, rationalist.
- George Berkeley (1685–1753). Idealist, empiricist.
- Charles de Secondat, Baron de Montesquieu (1689–1755). Skeptic, humanist.
- Francis Hutcheson (1694–1746). Proto–utilitarian.
- Voltaire (1694–1778). Advocate for freedoms of religion and expression.

==== 1700 ====
- Jonathan Edwards (1703–1758). American philosophical theologian.
- David Hartley (1705–1757).
- Julien La Mettrie (1709–1751). Materialist, genetic determinist.
- Thomas Reid (1710–1796). Member of Scottish Enlightenment, founder of Scottish Common Sense philosophy.
- David Hume (1711–1776). Empiricist, skeptic.
- Jean–Jacques Rousseau (1712–1778). Social contract political philosopher.
- Denis Diderot (1713–1784).
- Alexander Gottlieb Baumgarten (1714–1762).
- Claude Adrien Helvétius (1715–1771). Utilitarian.
- Etienne de Condillac (1715–1780).
- Jean d'Alembert (1717–1783).
- Baron d'Holbach (1723–1789). Materialist, atheist.
- Adam Smith (1723–1790). Economic theorist, member of Scottish Enlightenment.
- Immanuel Kant (1724–1804). Major contributions in nearly every field of philosophy, especially metaphysics, epistemology, ethics, and aesthetics.
- Moses Mendelssohn (1729–1786). Member of the Jewish Enlightenment.
- Gotthold Ephraim Lessing (1729–1781).
- Edmund Burke (1729–1797). Conservative political philosopher.
- Johann Georg Hamann (1730–1788).
- Thomas Paine (1737–1809).
- Cesare Beccaria (1738–1794). Italian criminologist, jurist, and philosopher from the Age of Enlightenment.
- Thomas Jefferson (1743–1826). Liberal political philosopher.
- Friedrich Heinrich Jacobi (1743–1819).
- Johann Gottfried von Herder (1744–1803).
- Jean-Baptiste Lamarck (1744–1829). Early evolutionary theorist.
- Jeremy Bentham (1748–1832). Utilitarian, hedonist.
- Pierre-Simon Laplace (1749–1827). Determinist.
- Joseph de Maistre (1753–1821) Conservative
- Louis de Bonald (1754 – 1840).
- William Godwin (1756–1836). Anarchist, utilitarian.
- Mary Wollstonecraft (1759–1797). Feminist.
- Friedrich Schiller (1759–1805).
- Comte de Saint-Simon (1760–1825). Socialist.
- Johann Gottlieb Fichte (1762–1814).
- Madame de Staël (1766–1817).
- Friedrich Schleiermacher (1768–1834). Hermeneutician.
- Friedrich Hölderlin (1770–1843). Poet and philosopher.
- G. W. F. Hegel (1770–1831). German idealist.
- Samuel Taylor Coleridge (1772 – 1834).
- James Mill (1773–1836). Utilitarian.
- F. W. J. von Schelling (1775–1854). German idealist.
- Bernard Bolzano (1781–1848).
- Arthur Schopenhauer (1788–1860). Pessimism, Critic, Absurdist.
- Thomas Carlyle (1795 – 1881).
- Sojourner Truth (c. 1797–1883). Egalitarian, abolitionist.
- Auguste Comte (1798–1857). Social philosopher, positivist.

=== Modern philosophers ===
==== 1800–1850 ====
- Ralph Waldo Emerson (1803–1882). Transcendentalist, abolitionist, egalitarian, humanist.
- Ludwig Feuerbach (1804–1872).
- Alexis de Tocqueville (1805–1859).
- Max Stirner (1806–1856). Anarchist.
- Augustus De Morgan (1806–1871). Logician.
- John Stuart Mill (1806–1873). Utilitarian.
- Pierre-Joseph Proudhon (1809–1865). Anarchist.
- Harriet Taylor Mill (1807–1858). Egalitarian, utilitarian.
- Charles Darwin (1809–1882). Scientist, whose works affected Philosophy of Science.
- Margaret Fuller (1810–1850). Egalitarian.
- Søren Kierkegaard (1813–1855). Existentialist.
- Mikhail Bakunin (1814–1876). Revolutionary anarchist.
- Elizabeth Cady Stanton (1815–1902). Egalitarian.
- Henry David Thoreau (1817–1862). Transcendentalist, pacifist, abolitionist.
- Karl Marx (1818–1883). Socialist, formulated historical materialism.
- Friedrich Engels (1820–1895). Egalitarian, dialectical materialist.
- Herbert Spencer (1820–1903). Nativism, libertarianism, social Darwinism.
- Susan B. Anthony (1820–1906). Feminist.
- Ernest Renan (1823 – 1892).
- Hippolyte Taine (1828 – 1893).
- Wilhelm Dilthey (1833–1911).
- T.H. Green (1836–1882). British idealist.
- Henry Sidgwick (1838–1900). Rationalism, utilitarianism.
- Ernst Mach (1838–1916). Philosopher of science, influence on logical positivism.
- Franz Brentano (1838–1917). Phenomenologist.
- Charles Sanders Peirce (1839–1914). Pragmatist.
- Philipp Mainländer (1841 — 1876). Pessimist.
- William James (1842–1910). Pragmatism, Radical empiricism.
- Hermann Cohen (1842-1918). Neo-Kantianism, Jewish philosophy.
- Peter Kropotkin (1842–1921). Anarchist communism.
- Friedrich Nietzsche (1844–1900). Naturalistic philosopher, influence on Existentialism.
- W. K. Clifford (1845–1879). Evidentialist.
- F. H. Bradley (1846–1924). Idealist.
- Vilfredo Pareto (1848–1923). Social philosopher.
- Gottlob Frege (1848–1925). Influential analytic philosopher.

==== 1850–1900 ====
- Henri Poincaré (1854–1912).
- Josiah Royce (1855–1916). Idealist.
- Sigmund Freud (1856–1939). Neurologist, founded psychoanalysis, posited structural model of mind.
- Georgi Plekhanov (1856-1918). Marxist, established Marxism in Russia.
- Ferdinand de Saussure (1857–1913). Linguist, Semiotics, Structuralism.
- Émile Durkheim (1858–1917). Social philosopher.
- Giuseppe Peano (1858–1932).
- Edmund Husserl (1859–1938). Founder of phenomenology.
- Henri Bergson (1859–1941). Vitalism.
- John Dewey (1859–1952). Pragmatism.
- Jane Addams (1860–1935). Pragmatist.
- Pierre Duhem (1861–1916).
- Rudolf Steiner (1861–1925). Anthroposophy
- Alfred North Whitehead (1861–1947). Process Philosophy, Mathematician, Logician, Philosophy of Physics, Panpsychism.
- George Herbert Mead (1863–1931). Pragmatism, symbolic interactionist.
- George Santayana (1863–1952). Pragmatism, naturalism; known for many aphorisms.
- Max Weber (1864–1920). Social philosopher.
- Miguel de Unamuno (1864–1936). Existentialist.
- Benedetto Croce (1866–1952).
- Lev Shestov (1868–1938).
- Emma Goldman (1869–1940). Anarchist.
- Rosa Luxemburg (1870–1919). Marxist political philosopher.
- Bertrand Russell (1872–1970). Analytic philosopher, nontheist, influential.
- G. E. Moore (1873–1958). Common sense theorist, ethical non–naturalist.
- Nikolai Berdyaev (1874–1948). Existentialist.
- Ernst Cassirer (1874–1945). Neo-Kantianism.
- Max Scheler (1874–1928). German phenomenologist.
- Carl Jung (1875–1961). Psychoanalyst, metaphysicist.
- Giovanni Gentile (1875–1944). Idealist and fascist philosopher.
- Martin Buber (1878–1965). Jewish philosopher, existentialist.
- Jan Łukasiewicz (1878-1956). Logician.
- Oswald Spengler (1880 – 1936).
- Ludwig von Mises (1881-1973).
- Pierre Teilhard de Chardin (1881–1955). Christian evolutionist.
- Hans Kelsen (1881–1973). Legal positivist.
- Moritz Schlick (1882–1936). Founder of Vienna Circle, logical positivism.
- Otto Neurath (1882–1945). Member of Vienna Circle.
- Nicolai Hartmann (1882–1950).
- Jacques Maritain (1882–1973). Human rights theorist.
- José Ortega y Gasset (1883–1955). Philosopher of History.
- Karl Jaspers (1883–1969). Existentialist.
- Gaston Bachelard (1884–1962).
- Otto Rank (1884–1939).
- Georg Lukács (1885–1971). Marxist philosopher.
- Karl Barth (1886–1968).
- René Guénon (1886 – 1951).
- Carl Schmitt (1888 – 1985).
- Ludwig Wittgenstein (1889–1951). Analytic philosopher, philosophy of language, philosophy of mind, influential.
- Gabriel Marcel (1889–1973). Christian existentialist.
- Martin Heidegger (1889–1976). Phenomenologist.
- Antonio Gramsci (1891–1937). Marxist philosopher.
- Rudolf Carnap (1891–1970). Vienna Circle. Logical positivist.
- Walter Benjamin (1892–1940). Marxist. Philosophy of language.
- Herman Dooyeweerd (1894–1977). Philosophy of the Law Idea.
- Max Horkheimer (1895-1973). Frankfurt School.
- Ernst Jünger (1895 – 1998).
- Susanne Langer (1895–1985).
- Georges Bataille (1897–1962).
- Julius Evola (1898 – 1974).
- Herbert Marcuse (1898–1979). Frankfurt School.
- C. S. Lewis (1898 – 1963).
- Friedrich Hayek (1899 – 1992).
- Leo Strauss (1899–1973). Political Philosopher.

==== 1900–1950 ====
- Gilbert Ryle (1900–1976).
- Hans-Georg Gadamer (1900–2002). Hermeneutics.
- Jacques Lacan (1901–1981). Structuralism.
- Henri Lefebvre (1901–1991). Marxist philosopher
- Alfred Tarski (1901–1983). Created T–Convention in semantics.
- Michael Oakeshott (1901–1990).
- Karl Popper (1902–1994). Philosopher of Science.
- Mortimer Adler (1902–2001).
- Eric Hoffer (1902–1983)
- Frank P. Ramsey (1903–1930). Proposed redundancy theory of truth.
- Theodor Adorno (1903–1969). Frankfurt School.
- Joseph Campbell (1904–1987) comparative mythology and comparative religion
- María Zambrano (1904–1991)
- Raymond Aron (1905–1983).
- Jean-Paul Sartre (1905–1980). Humanism, existentialism.
- Ayn Rand (1905–1982). Objectivist, Individualist.
- Kurt Gödel (1906–1978). Vienna Circle.
- Emmanuel Levinas (1906–1995).
- Hannah Arendt (1906–1975). Political Philosophy.
- H.L.A. Hart (1907–1992). Legal positivism.
- Maurice Merleau-Ponty (1908–1961). Influential French phenomenologist.
- Simone de Beauvoir (1908–1986). Existentialist, feminist.
- Willard van Orman Quine (1908–2000).
- Isaiah Berlin (1909–1997), historian of ideas.
- Simone Weil (1909–1943).
- A. J. Ayer (1910–1989). Logical positivist, emotivist.
- J. L. Austin (1911–1960).
- Marshall McLuhan (1911–1980). Media theory.
- Alan Turing (1912–1954). Functionalist in philosophy of mind.
- Wilfrid Sellars (1912–1989). Influential American philosopher
- Albert Camus (1913–1960). Absurdist.
- Paul Ricœur (1913–2005). French philosopher and theologian.
- Roland Barthes (1915–1980). French semiotician and literary theorist.
- Donald Davidson (1917–2003). Coherentist philosophy of mind.
- Louis Althusser (1918–1990). Structural Marxist.
- Russell Kirk (1918–1994).
- Aleksandr Solzhenitsyn (1918–2008).
- M. Bunge (1919–2020).
- P. F. Strawson (1919–2006). Ordinary language philosophy.
- John Rawls (1921–2002). Liberal.
- Paulo Freire (1921–1997). Pedagogy.
- Thomas Kuhn (1922–1996). Author of The Structure of Scientific Revolutions.
- Norwood Russell Hanson (1924–1967).
- Zygmunt Bauman (1925–2017). Polish sociologist and philosopher, who introduced the idea of liquid modernity.
- Frantz Fanon (1925–1961). Postcolonialism
- Gilles Deleuze (1925–1995). Post-structuralism
- Michel Foucault (1926–1984). Structuralism, Post-structuralism, Postmodernism, and the concept of biopolitics.
- Hilary Putnam (1926–2016). Neopragmatism.
- Noam Chomsky (born 1928). Linguist.
- Robert M. Pirsig (1928–2017). Introduced the Methaphysics of Quality. MOQ incorporates facets of East Asian philosophy, pragmatism and the work of F. S. C. Northrop.
- Bernard Williams (1929–2003). Moral philosopher.
- Jean Baudrillard (1929–2007). Postmodernism, Post-structuralism.
- Jürgen Habermas (1929–2026). Discourse ethics.
- Jaakko Hintikka (1929–2015).
- Alasdair MacIntyre (1929–2025). Aristotelian.
- Hubert Lederer Dreyfus (1929–2017)
- Allan Bloom (1930–1992). Political Philosopher.
- Pierre Bourdieu (1930–2002). French psychoanalytic sociologist and philosopher.
- Jacques Derrida (1930–2004). Deconstruction.
- Thomas Sowell (born 1930). Political Philosopher, capitalist.
- Guy Debord (1931–1994). French Marxist philosopher.
- Richard Rorty (1931–2007). Pragmatism, Postanalytic philosophy.
- Charles Taylor (born 1931). Political philosophy, Philosophy of Social Science, and Intellectual History.
- Umberto Eco (1932–2016). Semiotics, Aesthetics
- John Searle (born 1932). Direct realism.
- Alvin Plantinga (born 1932). Reformed epistemology, Philosophy of Religion.
- Jerry Fodor (1935–2017).
- Alain Badiou (born 1937).
- Thomas Nagel (born 1937). Qualia theory.
- Robert Nozick (1938–2002). Libertarian.
- Tom Regan (1938–2017). Animal rights philosopher.
- Saul Kripke (1940–2022). Modal semantics.
- Jean-Luc Nancy (1940–2021) French philosopher.
- David K. Lewis (1941–2001). Modal realism.
- Gerald Allan Cohen (1941–2008) Analytical Marxism.
- Derek Parfit (1942–2017).
- Giorgio Agamben (born 1942). State of exception, form–of–life, and Homo sacer.
- Daniel Dennett (born 1942–2024).
- Gayatri Chakravorty Spivak (born 1942). Postcolonialism, Feminism, Literary theory.
- Roger Scruton (1944–2020). Traditionalist conservatism.
- Simon Blackburn (1944). Analytic philosophy.
- Peter Singer (born 1946) Moral philosopher on animal liberation, effective altruism.
- Bruno Latour (1947–2022) French Philosopher, anthropologist, sociologist.
- Camille Paglia (born 1947).
- Martha Nussbaum (born 1947). Political philosopher.
- Hans-Hermann Hoppe (born 1949).
- Slavoj Žižek (born 1949). German Idealism, Marxism and Lacanian psychoanalysis.
- Ken Wilber (born 1949). Integral Theory.

==== 1950–2000 ====
- Cornel West (born 1953).
- Michael Sandel (born 1953). Political philosopher
- Judith Butler (born 1956). Poststructuralist, feminist, queer theory.
- Alexander Wendt (born 1958). Social constructivism.
- Michel Onfray (born 1959).
- Byung-Chul Han (born 1959).
- Simon Critchley (born 1960). Continental philosophy
- Nick Land (born 1962). Accelerationist.
- Ray Brassier (born 1965). Nihilist.
- David Benatar (born 1966). Antinatalist.
- Alenka Zupančič (born 1966). German Idealism, Nietzsche, Lacanian Psychoanalysis.
- Alain de Botton (born 1969).
- Nick Bostrom (born 1973).
- Bernardo Kastrup (born 1976).

== See also ==
- Contemporary philosophy
- Timeline of German Idealism
- List of years in philosophy
- Category:21st-century philosophers
