= The Oldest Systematic Program of German Idealism =

Philosophical work

"The Oldest Systematic Program of German Idealism" (German: Das älteste Systemprogramm des deutschen Idealismus) is a fragmentary 1796/97 essay of unknown authorship. The document was first published (in German) by Franz Rosenzweig in 1917. An English translation was made by Diana I. Behler.

The German title is: Das Älteste Systemprogramm Des Deutschen Idealismus. This title was made up by Franz Rosenzweig in 1917, when he first published the manuscript. He found the manuscript in the Royal Library in Berlin in 1913. The manuscript's suggested date is around 1796 and was done by handwriting research. However, the manuscript is not dated. The Prussian State Library auctioned in March 1913 from the auction of the house Liepmannssohn in Berlin a single sheet on the front and back with Hegel's cursive handwriting. The manuscript was lost during WWII. But Dieter Henrich found it again in 1979 in the “Biblioteka Jagiellonska” in Krakow (Poland), where it is today. Address: Jagiellonian Library, Jagiellonian University, al. Mickiewicza 22, 30-059 Cracow, Poland. Later research suggests that manuscript had come from the estate of Hegel's student Friedrich Christoph Förster (1791-1868). He was one of the editors of Hegel's posthumous works and most likely had access to a number of Hegel's manuscripts. This text actually being one of them. Hegel traveled around Bohemia with Marie and Friedrich Christoph Förster around the year 1820–21.

== Authorship ==
Although the document is in G. W. F. Hegel's handwriting, it is thought it has been written by either Hegel, F. W. J. Schelling, Friedrich Hölderlin, or an unknown fourth person. Yves Bonnefoy writes that it was "certainly inspired by Hölderlin." According to Glenn Magee, most Hegel scholars assume that Hegel is the author of the document. In the book Martin Heidegger's Path of Thinking by Otto Pöggeler, page 265. Reports. “Heidegger owned the Rosenzweig’s edition of the “oldest systematic program” of 1917, but said he could “never reconcile himself with the notion”: “Text by Schelling, notes by Hegel”.

At the time the manuscript was drafted, Hegel and Hölderlin were about 26 and Schelling was 21. Three years earlier, the three had been classmates and roommates together at Tübinger Stift, the seminary of the University of Tübingen, and were then collectively known as the "Tübingen Three". Hegel and Hölderlin were at the seminary from age 18 to 23, and Schelling from age 13 to 18.

Scholars on the topic of authorship:

- Franz Rosenzweig (1917) – Schelling
- Wilhelm Böhm (1926) – Hölderlin
- Johannes Hoffmeister (1931) - Schelling.
- Hans-Gero Boehm (1932) - Schelling.
- Johannes Hoffmeister (1932) - Schelling.
- Kurt Schilling (1934) - Schelling und Hölderlin.
- Jean Hyppolite (1935) - Hegel
- Emil Staiger (1935) - Schelling.
- Johannes Hoffmeister (1936) - Schelling.
- Theodor Haering (1938) - Schelling/Hölderlin/Hegel?
- Johannes Jeremias (1938) - Hegel?
- Gertrud Jäger (1939) - Schelling.
- Kurt Hildebrandt (1939) - Schelling und Hölderlin.
- Johannes Hoffmeister (1939) - Schelling.
- Hermann Glockner (1940) - Schelling und Hölderlin.
- Wilhelm Michel (1940) - Schelling.
- Johannes Hoffmeister (1942) - Schelling.
- Boris Jakowenko (1943) - Hegel.
- Ernst Müller (1944) - Schelling.
- Georg Lukäcs (1948) - Schelling.
- Richard Geis (1950) - Schelling.
- Hermann Zeltner (1954) - Schelling.
- Karl Jaspers (1955) - Schelling.
- Walter Schulz (1955) - Schelling.
- Alexander Hollerbach (1957) - Schelling.
- Manfred Schröter (1960) - Schelling.
- Friedrich Beißner (1961) - Schelling.
- Heinz Otto Burger (1962) - Schelling.
- Horst Fuhrmans (1962) - Schelling.
- Jürgen Habermas (1963) - Schelling.
- Otto Pöggeler (1965) - Hegel.

List from: Frank-Peter Hansen (see Bibliography).

- Martin Heidegger (1965) - not Schelling. But did not side with any other author.
- Martin Oesch (1995) - Wilhelm Friedrich Schlegel
- Daniel Fidel Ferrer (2021) – Hegel (see Ferrer, page 25).

== Content ==
Raffaele Milani writes that in the essay, "...the idea of Beauty unifies all others in a fusion of the self and nature." Dieter Henrich called the document a "program for agitation." It called for a new mythology to mediate between the present state and the future envisioned poeticized state, in which poetry will function for the arts and sciences, including philosophy. Jason Josephson-Storm has interpreted the essay as a source on Hegel's view of myth, especially Hegel's perception (in line with other eighteenth- and nineteenth-century German philosophers) that myth has disappeared and left a cultural vacuum, which Josephson-Storm argues anticipates the idea of disenchantment.

== See also ==
- German idealism
- German Romanticism
- Timeline of German idealism
- Weimar Classicism

== Bibliography ==
- Frank-Peter Hansen. Das älteste Systemprogramm des deutschen Idealismus. Rezeptionsgeschichte und Interpretation. 1989, 2014. ISBN 978-3110118094. Berlin New York: Walter de Gruyter. Page 1–514. Reviews 100s of articles from different periods since 1917. Extensive bibliography.
