= Franz Rosenzweig =

Jewish theologian and philosopher (1886–1929)

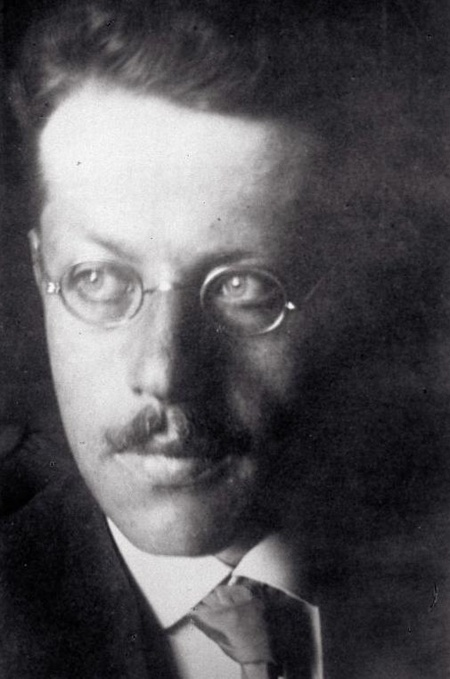
- Born: 25 December 1886; Kassel, German Empire
- Died: 10 December 1929 (aged 42); Frankfurt, Germany

Education
- Education: University of Freiburg; University of Berlin
- Academic advisor: Hermann Cohen

Philosophical work
- Era: 20th-century philosophy
- Region: Western philosophy
- School: Continental philosophy Existentialism
- Main interests: Theology, philosophy, German idealism, philosophy of religion
- Notable ideas: Star of redemption

Franz Rosenzweig (/ˈroʊzən.zwaɪɡ/; German: [ˈfʁant͡s ˈʁoːzn̩ˌt͡svaɪk]; 25 December 1886 – 10 December 1929) was a German theologian, philosopher, and translator.

== Early life and education ==
Franz Rosenzweig was born in Kassel, Germany, to an affluent, minimally observant Jewish family. His father owned a factory for dyestuff and was a city council member. Through his granduncle, Adam Rosenzweig, he came in contact with traditional Judaism and was inspired to request Hebrew lessons when he was around 11 years old. After graduating from High School, he served as a voluntary teacher at the Samsonschule in Wolfenbuettel. He started to study medicine for five semesters in Göttingen, Munich, and Freiburg. In 1907 he changed subjects and studied history and philosophy at the University of Freiburg and the University of Berlin.

Rosenzweig, under the influence of his colleague and close friend Eugen Rosenstock-Huessy, considered converting to Christianity. Determined to embrace the faith as the early Christians did, he resolved to live as a Jew first, before becoming Christian. A legend arose that after attending Yom Kippur services at a small Orthodox synagogue in Berlin, he underwent a mystical experience. As a result, he became a baal teshuva. However, this legend has been debunked: he attended a large modern Orthodox synagogue and had already decided against conversion. Rosenzweig never again entertained converting to Christianity, though he had many close Christian friends.

In 1913, he turned to Jewish philosophy. His letters to his cousin and close friend Eugen Rosenstock-Huessy, whom he had nearly followed into Christianity, have been published as Judaism Despite Christianity. Rosenzweig was a student of Hermann Cohen, and the two became close. While writing a doctoral dissertation on Georg Wilhelm Friedrich Hegel, Hegel and the State, Rosenzweig turned against idealism and sought a philosophy that did not begin with an abstract notion of the human.

Later in the decade, Rosenzweig discovered a manuscript apparently written in Hegel’s hand, which he named The Oldest Systematic Program of German Idealism. The manuscript (first published in 1917) has been dated to 1796 and appears to show the influence of F. W. J. Schelling and Friedrich Hölderlin. Despite early debate about the authorship of the document, scholars now generally accept that it was written by Hegel, making Rosenzweig’s discovery valuable for contemporary Hegel scholarship.

== Career ==
=== The Star of Redemption ===
A representation of Rosenzweig's Star of Redemption

Rosenzweig's major work is The Star of Redemption (first published in 1921). It is a description of the relationships between God, humanity, and the world, as they are connected by creation, revelation and redemption. If one makes a diagram with God at the top, and the World and the Self below, the inter-relationships generate a Star of David map. He is critical of any attempt to replace actual human existence with an ideal. In Rosenzweig's scheme, revelation arises not in metaphysics but in the here and now. We are called to love God, and to do so is to return to the world, and that is redemption.

Two translations into English have appeared, the most recent by Dr. Barbara E. Galli of McGill University in 2005 and by Professor William Wolfgang Hallo in 1971.

=== Collaboration with Buber ===
Rosenzweig was engaged critically with the Jewish Zionist scholar Martin Buber. The two exchanged letters on the subject of a lecture series which Buber had given. In 1923, one of the letters was published by Rosenzweig as an open letter entitled "The Builders".

Unlike Buber, Rosenzweig felt that a return to Israel would embroil the Jews into a worldly history that they should eschew. Rosenzweig criticized Buber's dialogical philosophy because it is based not only on the I-Thou relation but also on I-It, a notion that Rosenzweig rejected. He thought that the counterpart to I-Thou should be He-It, namely “as He said and it became”: building the "it" around the human "I"—the human mind—is an idealistic mistake. Rosenzweig and Buber worked together on a translation of the Tanakh, or Hebrew Bible, from Hebrew to German. The translation, while contested, has led to several other translations in other languages that use the same methodology and principles. Their publications concerning the nature and philosophy of translation are still widely read.

=== Educational activities ===
Rosenzweig, unimpressed with the impersonal learning of the academy, founded the House of Jewish Learning in Frankfurt in 1920, which sought to engage in dialogue with human beings rather than merely accumulate knowledge. Many prominent Jewish intellectuals were associated with the Lehrhaus, as it was known in Germany, such as Leo Löwenthal of the Frankfurt School of critical theory, the liberal rabbi Benno Jacob, historian of medicine Richard Koch, the chemist Eduard Strauß, the feminist Bertha Pappenheim, Siegfried Kracauer, a culture critic for the Frankfurter Zeitung, S.Y. Agnon, who later won the Nobel Prize for Literature, Gershom Scholem, the founder of modern secular studies of the Kabbalah and Jewish mysticism, and Erich Fromm, a key early member of the Frankfurt School. In October 1922, Rudolf Hallo took over the leadership of the Lehrhaus. The Lehrhaus stayed open until 1930 and was reopened by Martin Buber in 1933.

== Illness and death ==
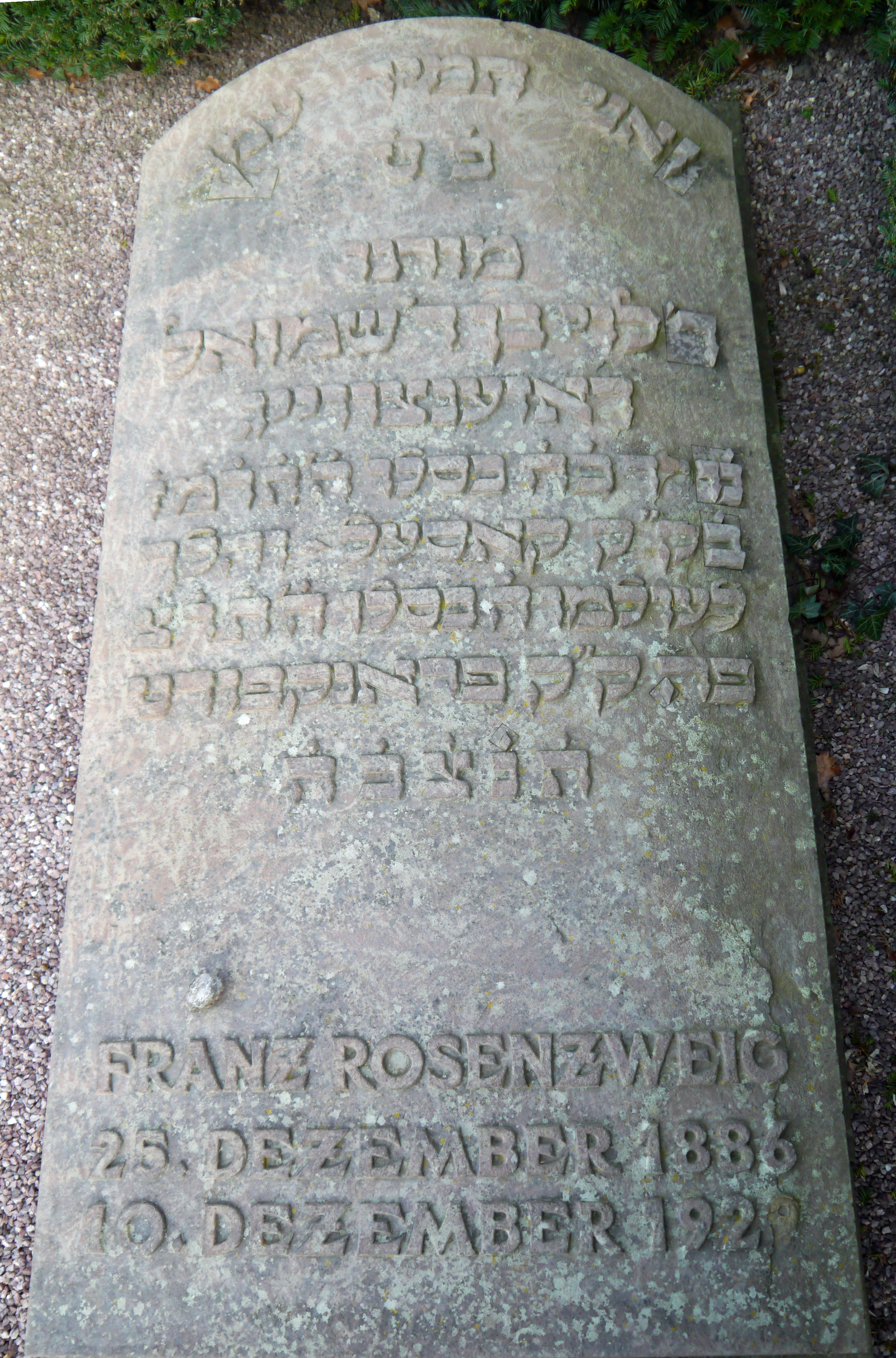
Grave of Rosenzweig

Rosenzweig suffered from the muscular degenerative disease amyotrophic lateral sclerosis (also known as motor neurone disease (MND) or Lou Gehrig's disease). Towards the end of his life, he had to write with the help of his wife, Edith, who would recite letters of the alphabet until he indicated for her to stop, continuing until she could guess the word or phrase he intended (or, at other times, Rosenzweig would point to the letter on the plate of his typewriter). They also developed a communication system based on him blinking his eyes.

Rosenzweig's final attempt to communicate his thought, via the laborious typewriter-alphabet method, consisted in the partial sentence: "And now it comes, the point of all points, which the Lord has truly revealed to me in my sleep, the point of all points for which there—". The writing was interrupted by his doctor, with whom he had a short discussion using the same method. When the doctor left, Rosenzweig did not wish to continue with the writing, and he died on the night of 10 December 1929, in Frankfurt, the sentence left unfinished.

Rosenzweig was buried on 12 December 1929. There was no eulogy; Buber read Psalm 73.

After his death, his widow Edith and son Rafael fled Germany for Palestine in 1939. Rosenzweig's library with about 3,000 volumes was to follow him, but the cargo ship was diverted to Tunis during the Second World War. It is now in the National Library of Tunisia, Dâr Al-Kutub Al-Wataniya.

== See also ==
- Interfaith dialogue
- André Neher
- Wissenschaft des Judentums
