= German idealism =

Philosophical movement

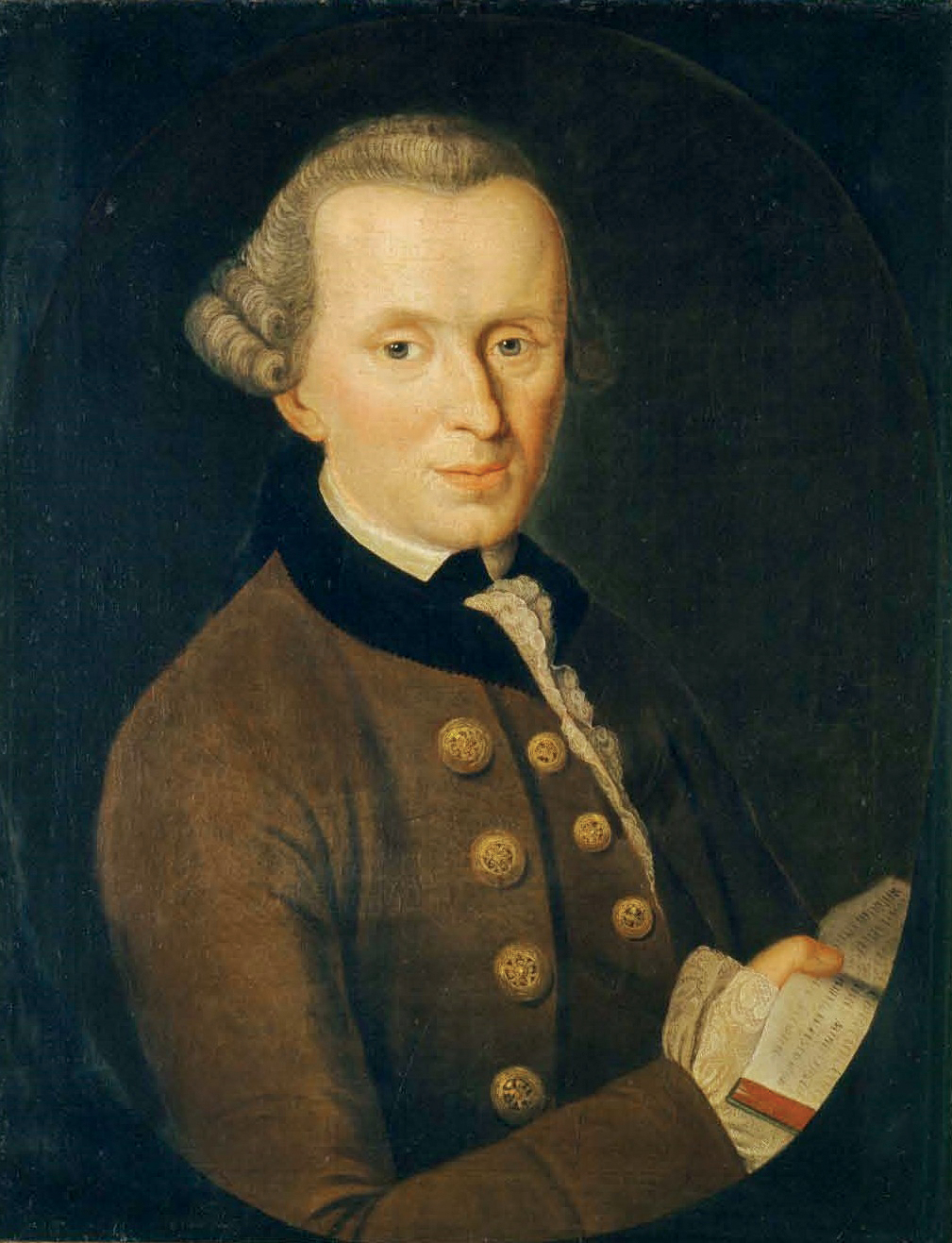
Immanuel Kant

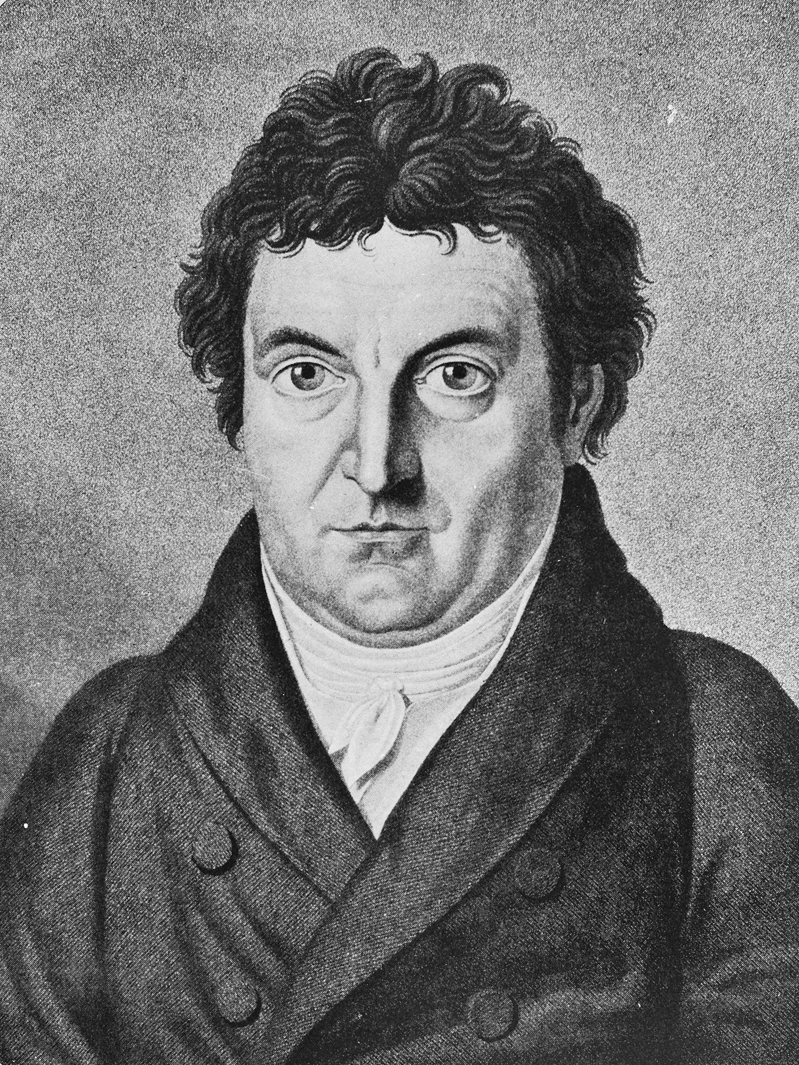
Johann Gottlieb Fichte

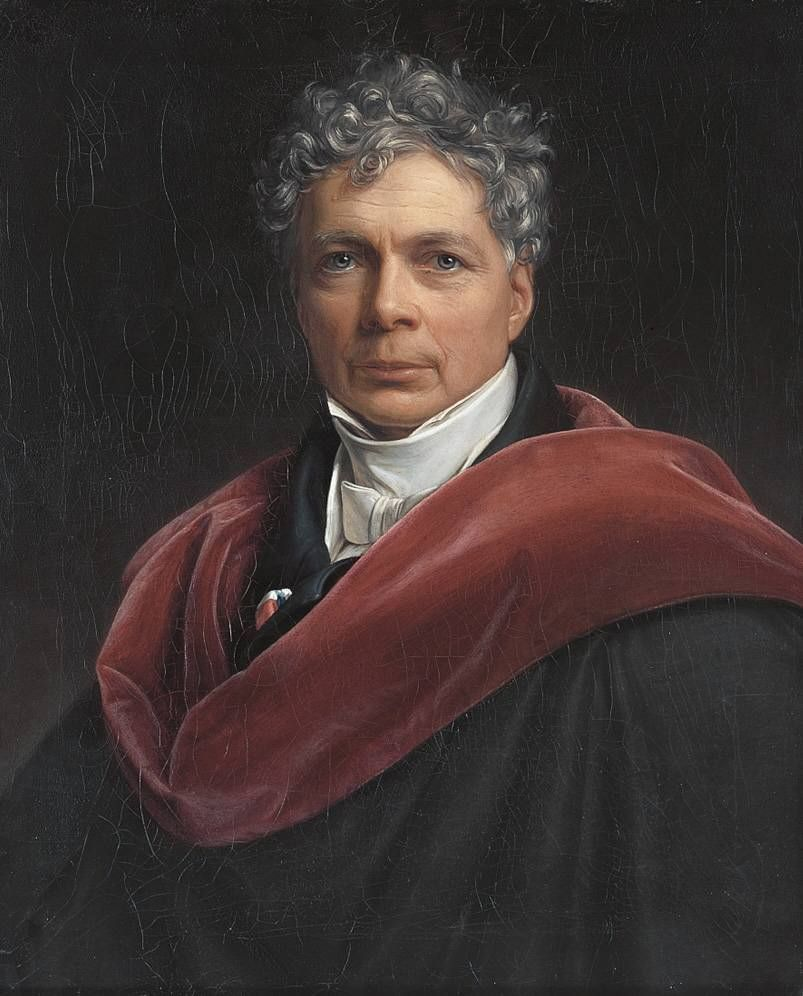
Friedrich Wilhelm Joseph Schelling

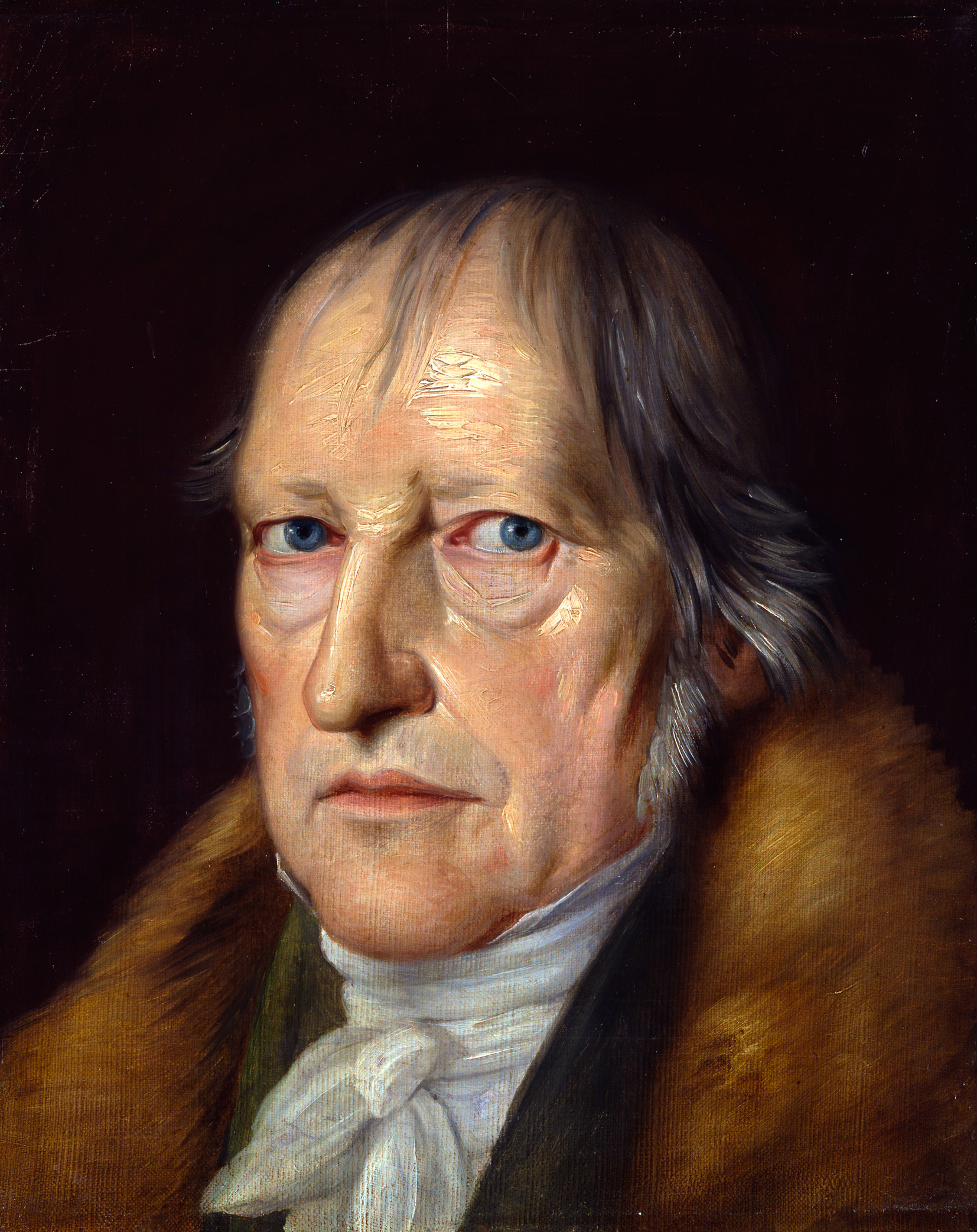
Georg Wilhelm Friedrich Hegel

German idealism (German: Deutscher Idealismus) was a philosophical movement that emerged in Germany in the late 18th and early 19th centuries. It developed out of the work of Immanuel Kant in the 1780s and 1790s, and was closely linked with both Romanticism and the revolutionary politics of the Enlightenment. The most prominent German idealists were Kant, Johann Gottlieb Fichte, Friedrich Wilhelm Joseph Schelling, and Georg Wilhelm Friedrich Hegel, who is considered the most influential figure of the movement. Other thinkers, such as Friedrich Heinrich Jacobi, Karl Leonhard Reinhold, Friedrich Schlegel, and Novalis, also made major contributions. The period of German idealism is considered one of the most intellectually fertile in modern philosophy, with some comparing its prominence to that of the golden age of philosophy in ancient Athens.

The movement is best understood as a manifestation of the modern demand for rationality and freedom. It originated in Kant's attempt to reconcile the empiricism of thinkers like David Hume with the rationalism of Gottfried Wilhelm Leibniz and Baruch Spinoza. Hume's skepticism had challenged the core tenets of the Enlightenment, arguing that reason was subordinate to custom and habit and that free will was an "unattainable fantasy". All forms of German idealism sought to resolve the crisis of the Enlightenment by attempting to "save criticism from skepticism, and naturalism from materialism". Kant's transcendental idealism asserted that the mind is not a passive recipient of sensory information, but actively structures our experience of the world through an act of "spontaneity". His work, however, limited knowledge to appearances (phenomena) and left the nature of things as they are in themselves (noumena) unknowable.

Fichte, Schelling, and Hegel attempted to overcome this dualism while defending Kant's central insight that the thinking subject is a necessary condition for all experience. They responded to renewed skeptical challenges by pursuing a more rigorously systematic philosophy than Kant, with their characteristic ambition becoming the creation of a complete, systematic philosophy derived from a single foundational principle. Fichte's Wissenschaftslehre centered on the absolute "I" or self-consciousness as the ground of all experience. Schelling's "identity philosophy" replaced Fichte's absolute subject with a monistic "Absolute" as the ground of both nature and mind. Hegel's absolute idealism rejected the foundationalism of his predecessors, arguing that philosophy must be a presuppositionless system that traces the self-development of "the concept" to reveal the rational structure of actuality itself.

German idealism is distinguished by its exploration of the relationship between reason and reality, the nature of freedom, and the contours of modernity. The movement effectively ended with Hegel's death in 1831, but its influence was profound and enduring. Its legacy shaped the development of post-Hegelian philosophy, including the work of Søren Kierkegaard, Karl Marx, and the neo-Kantians. In the 20th century, idealism profoundly influenced continental philosophy, and it has become an increasingly significant influence in contemporary analytic philosophy.

== Historical background ==
The intellectual problem that gave rise to German idealism was the modern split between mind and world, or subject and object, that had structured philosophy since the 17th century. This problem was rooted in a longer historical process of secularization that had displaced religious authority and transformed the classical Greek understanding of being (logos) into the modern concept of a reality accessible to human consciousness.

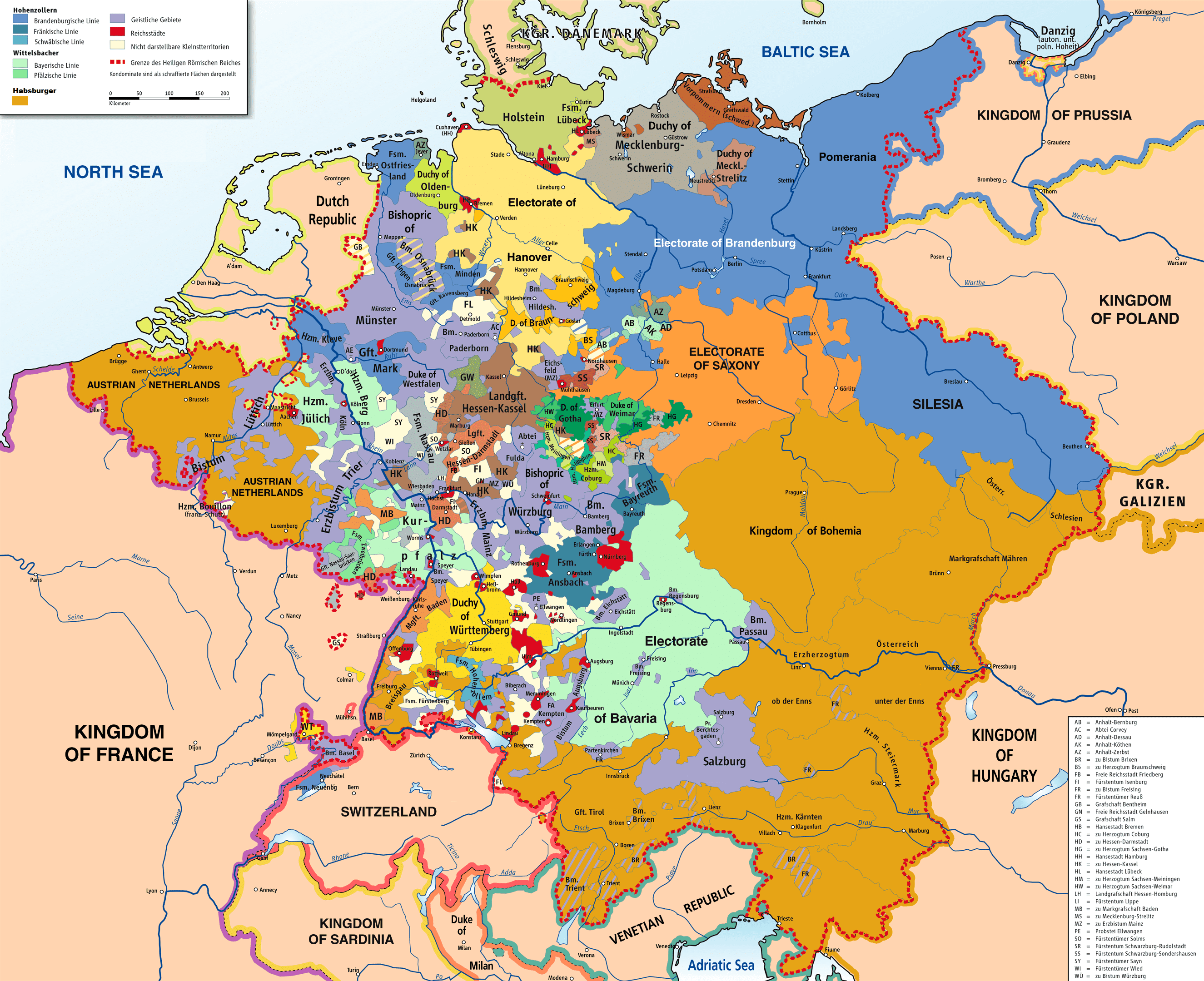
Map of the Holy Roman Empire, c. 1789

The broader cultural context was shaped by the Enlightenment, with its emphasis on reason as the basis for legitimate authority and its promise of replacing premodern acceptance of unjustified authority with a modern commitment to rational justification and freedom. In late 18th-century Germany, however, this Enlightenment promise existed within a complex and contradictory social landscape. Politically, "Germany" did not exist as a unified nation-state but was a fragmented collection of principalities under the loose authority of the expiring Holy Roman Empire. This fragmentation, combined with rapid population growth and the pressures of early industrialization, produced significant social tension. A growing, educated middle class found its opportunities for employment and social advancement stifled by a patronage-based society that remained largely aristocratic.

This situation led to a pervasive "dual consciousness" among the educated classes. They felt alienated from the conformist, traditional social order, which seemed to prescribe their life-paths for them, while simultaneously feeling compelled by an inner, "natural" sense of authenticity and a desire to lead their "own" lives. This sense of alienation was amplified by new cultural movements. A burgeoning reading public, fueled by the rise of journals and novels, embraced a new ideal of self-cultivation (Bildung). The emotionalist currents of Pietism and the Sturm und Drang literary movement, exemplified by the thought of Jean-Jacques Rousseau and Johann Wolfgang von Goethe's enormously popular novel The Sorrows of Young Werther (1774), gave voice to the widespread dissatisfaction with the perceived cold rationalism of the Enlightenment and the longing for a more authentic, self-directed existence. The immediate philosophical impetus, however, came from the skeptical and determinist challenges posed by the Scottish philosopher David Hume.

=== Hume's challenge to the Enlightenment ===
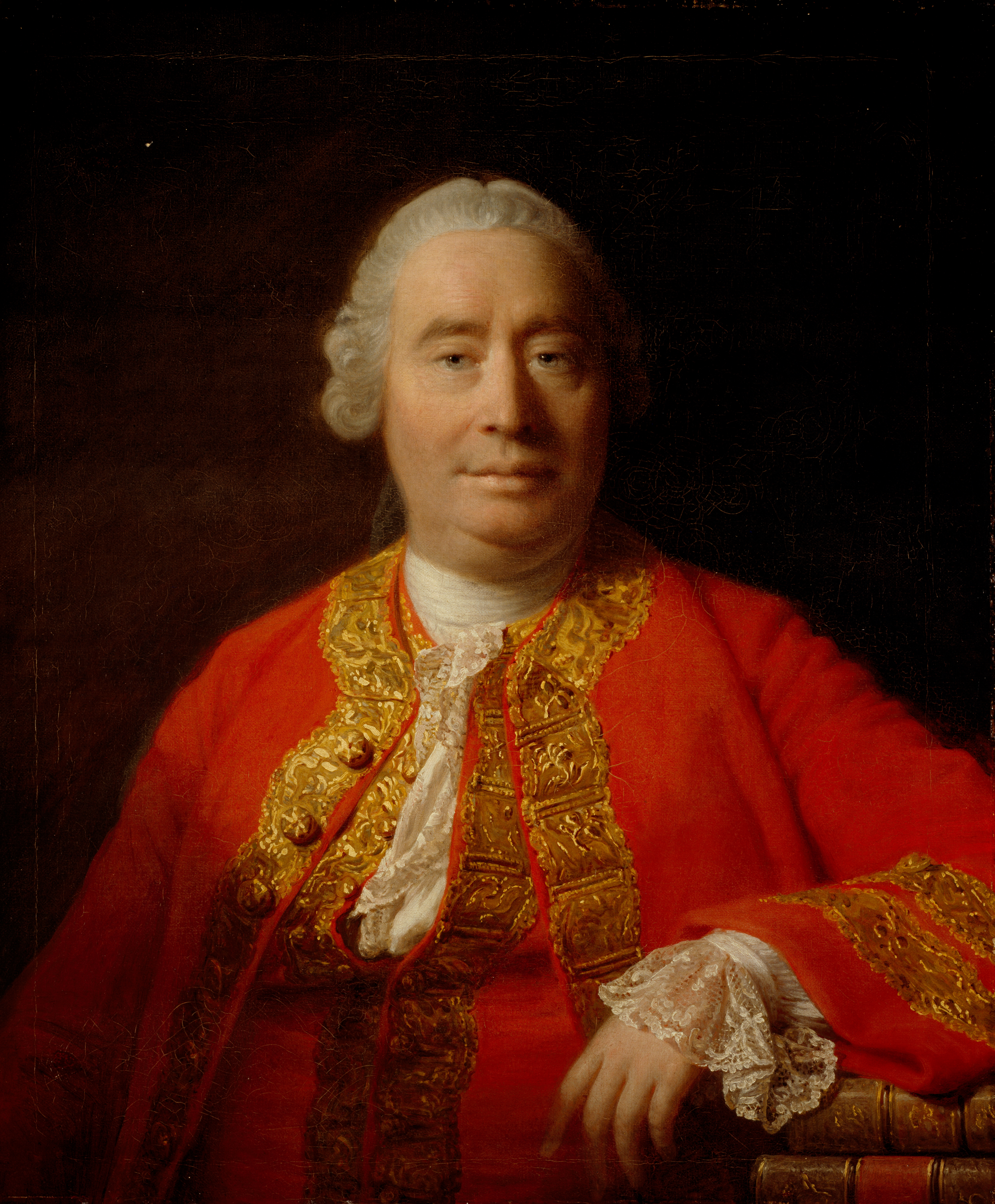
The skepticism of Scottish philosopher David Hume was the "proximate philosophical cause" of German idealism.

The Enlightenment project rested on the idea that human beings could be self-determining or free by exercising their own rationality, rather than deferring to external authorities. Hume's philosophy, however, threatened this project by questioning the very capacity of reason to ground belief and action. Hume was a committed empiricist, holding that all ideas must derive from sensory experience, which he called "impressions". He argued that knowledge is limited to either "relations of ideas" (logical truths known a priori, such as "all bachelors are unmarried") or "matters of fact" (truths known a posteriori through experience).

Hume's most significant attack was on the concept of causality. He argued that all knowledge of matters of fact beyond immediate sensory experience or memory depends on causal inference. However, he observed that we never have an "impression" of the necessary connection that is supposed to link a cause and its effect. Instead, we only experience a "constant conjunction" of events. From this, Hume concluded that our belief in causality is not based on reason, but on habit or custom formed by the repeated observation of conjoined events. The practice of inductive reasoning, which generalizes from past experience to future events, therefore lacks any rational justification.

This skepticism about causality had two devastating consequences for the Enlightenment project. First, it undermined the claims of science and rational cognition, suggesting that our most basic beliefs about the world rest on faith rather than reason. Second, it led to determinism regarding human action. Hume contended that just as we observe regularity in the behavior of natural phenomena, we also observe regularity in human behavior. The "necessity" we attribute to both is simply this observed regularity. He concluded that humans have no more free will than natural objects, and that reason is merely "a slave to the passions", capable of guiding behavior toward satisfying desires but not of determining those desires or initiating actions autonomously. Hume's philosophy thus suggested that the modern aspirations for rational self-determination were an "unattainable fantasy".

By the 1770s, the dangers of Hume's skepticism and the materialism of French thinkers such as Baron d'Holbach and Julien Offray de La Mettrie were widely recognized in Germany, leading to a "crisis of the Enlightenment". The problem Kant set for himself was to establish how metaphysics could be possible at all. In a 1772 letter to his student Marcus Herz, he posed what he saw as the key question for all of metaphysics: "What is the ground of that in us which we call 'representation' to the object?"

== Kant's critical philosophy ==
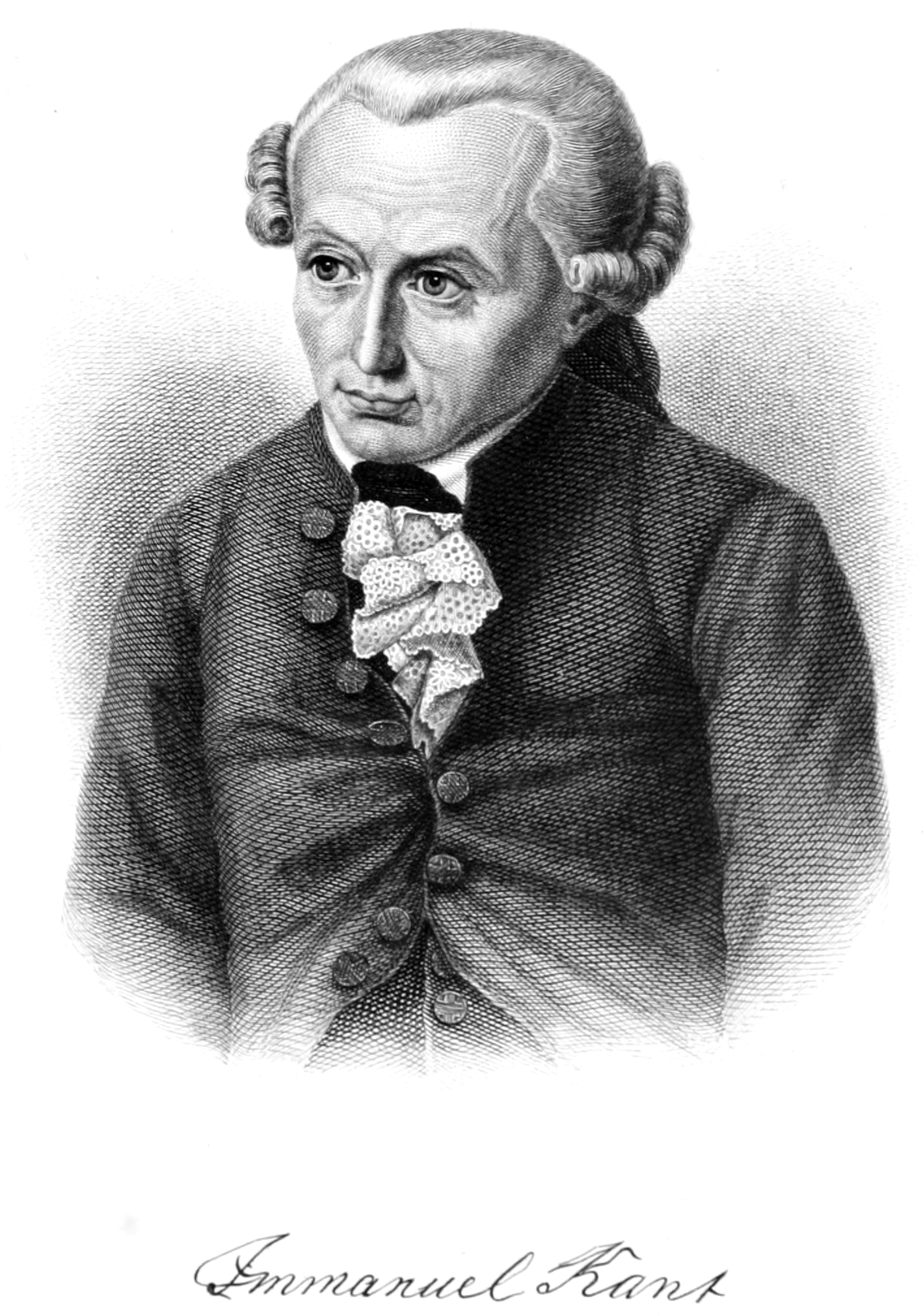
Immanuel Kant initiated the German idealist movement with his "critical philosophy".

Immanuel Kant (1724–1804) famously stated that Hume's skepticism "first interrupted my dogmatic slumber and gave a completely different direction to my researches". Kant's goal was to develop a new philosophical alternative that would grant the failure of traditional rationalism while avoiding the skepticism and determinism of empiricism. He also sought to reconcile the deterministic worldview of Newtonian science with the modern belief in human freedom championed by thinkers like Jean-Jacques Rousseau.

In his three major works—the Critique of Pure Reason (1781), Critique of Practical Reason (1788), and Critique of Judgment (1790)—he undertook a "critique of reason" to determine the limits and capacities of rational cognition and action. His project, announced in his 1784 essay "Answering the Question: What Is Enlightenment?", was to vindicate the authority of reason by first subjecting it to a critique that would establish its proper boundaries. This required the "courage" to "think for oneself" rather than deferring to external authority. To address the problem of metaphysics, Kant developed a new "transcendental" approach to philosophy, which investigated the conditions of knowledge itself rather than making claims about objects. He thus sought to re-establish metaphysics as a "science of reason", and to "establish criticism without skepticism, and naturalism without materialism". The resulting philosophy, which he called transcendental idealism, launched the German idealist movement.

=== The "Copernican Revolution" in epistemology ===
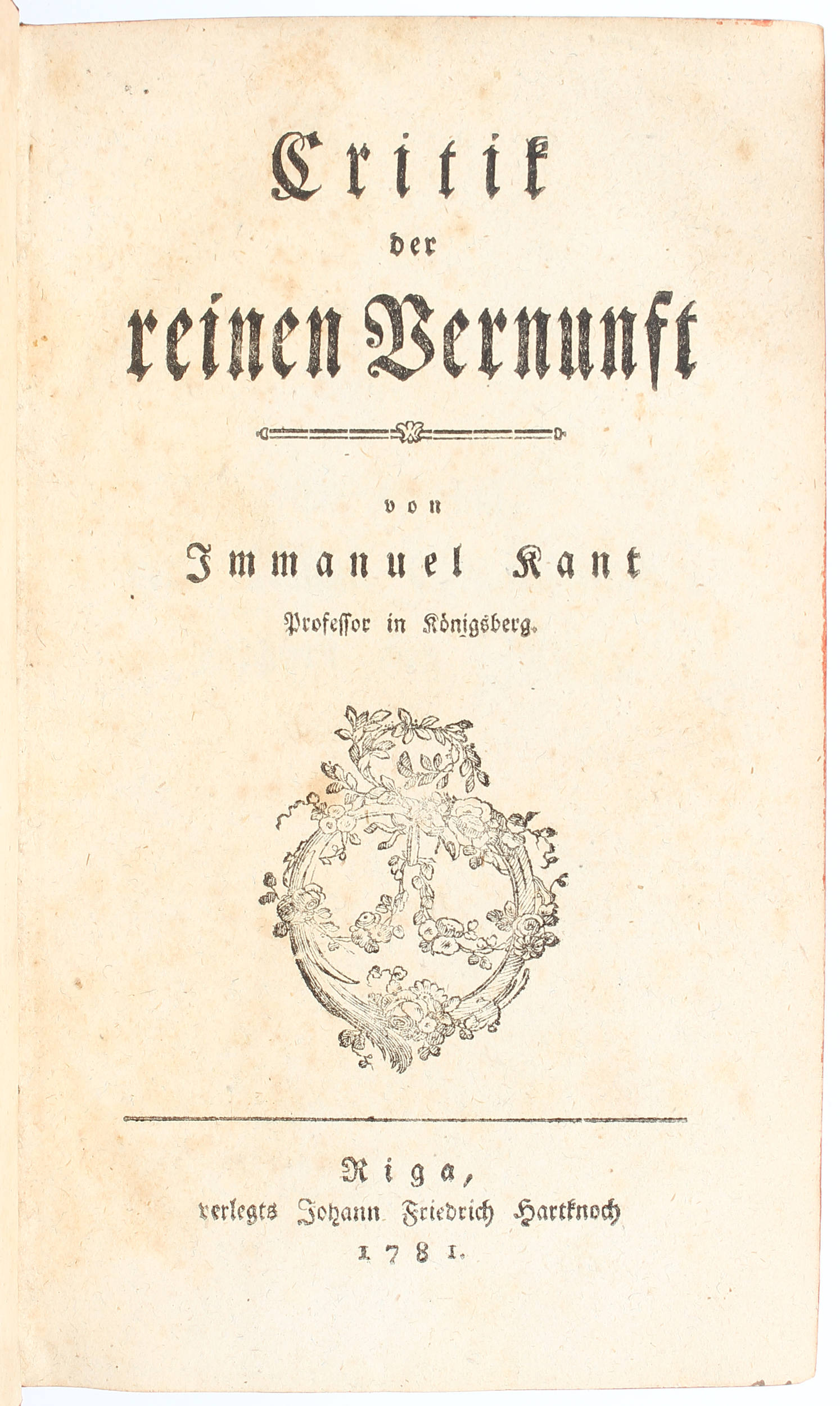
Title page of the Critique of Pure Reason (1781)

Kant's central innovation was what he called a "Copernican Revolution" in epistemology. Previous philosophy had assumed that for knowledge to be possible, the knowing subject must conform their mental representations to the object being known. Kant argued that this assumption led inevitably to Humean skepticism, since experience can only provide provisional generalizations, not the necessary and universal truths required by metaphysics.

Kant proposed reversing this assumption: for metaphysical knowledge to be possible, the objects of experience must conform to the structure of the knowing subject's mind. This would allow for knowledge of features that apply necessarily and universally to all possible objects of experience, because these features would be contributed by the mind itself. This knowledge would be synthetic (informative about the world) and a priori (independent of any particular experience). He argued that experience is a joint product of a receptive faculty of sensibility (which provides intuitions) and a spontaneous faculty of understanding (which provides concepts). The task of Kant's Critique of Pure Reason was to identify and describe these "transcendental" conditions of the possibility of experience.

To do this, Kant distinguished between "phenomena" (appearances, or objects as they are experienced by us) and "noumena" (things-in-themselves, or objects as they are independent of our experience). He argued that synthetic a priori knowledge is possible, but it is strictly limited to phenomena. We can know, for example, that every event in our experience will have a cause, because causality is a structural condition imposed by our understanding. However, we can know nothing whatsoever about things-in-themselves.

=== Freedom and morality ===
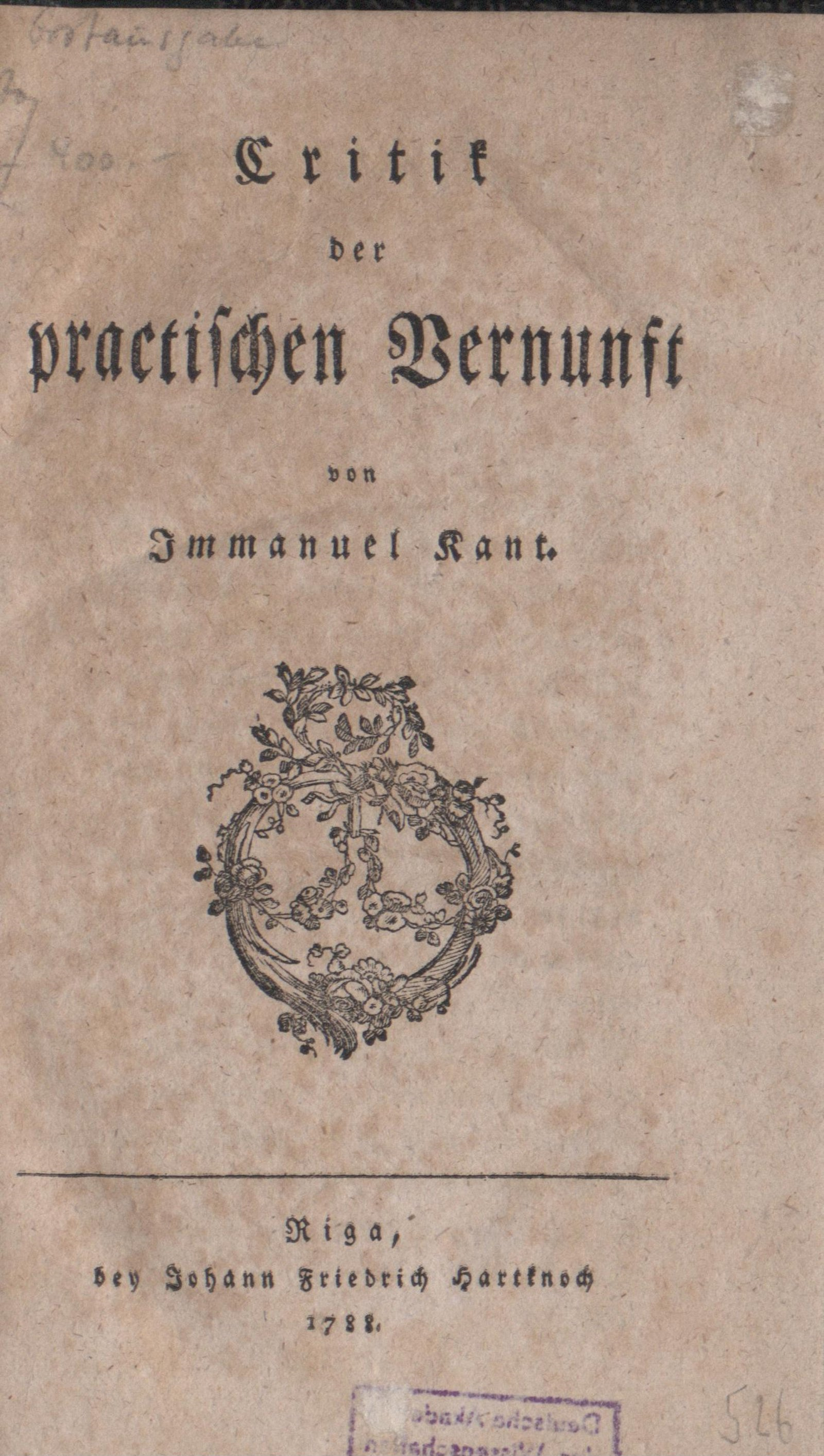
Title page of the Critique of Practical Reason (1788)

Kant's limitation of knowledge to appearances was crucial for his defense of freedom. Although every event in the phenomenal world must be experienced as causally determined, this does not apply to the noumenal world. Therefore, it remains possible that human actions, considered as noumenal events, are free. Kant famously stated he had to "limit knowledge to make way for faith".

In the first Critique, Kant argued that morality was "foreign to transcendental philosophy", as the problem of a priori reference to objects does not arise in practical contexts. However, a 1782 review by Christian Garve forced him to reconsider. Garve's critique led Kant to see that moral laws themselves were synthetic a priori propositions, the possibility of which required a philosophical defense. He addressed this in his Groundwork of the Metaphysics of Morals (1785) and the Critique of Practical Reason (1788). In these works, Kant argued that our status as rational animals with both moral obligations and natural desires leads us to hope for a future in which happiness is proportional to moral worth. While theoretical reason cannot prove their existence, practical reason requires us to postulate the existence of God and the immortality of the soul to sustain our "rational faith" that the highest good is possible.

Our experience of moral obligation, expressed in the word "ought", only makes sense if we are free to act in accordance with it. As Kant declared, "ought implies can". For Kant, freedom is not the ability to act according to one's desires, but the capacity for autonomy: the ability to act according to the moral law that reason gives to itself. A moral act is one performed not from inclination or desire, but out of pure respect for the moral law, which is formulated in the categorical imperative: "I ought never to act except in such a way that I could also will that my maxim should become a universal law". This capacity for self-legislation implies that all rational agents are "ends in themselves" who must be treated with "dignity". This leads to the idea of a moral community, a "Kingdom of Ends", in which all individuals are both authors and subjects of the universal law. Subsequent reception of Kant's ethics, particularly by the German idealists, has often overemphasized this formalistic aspect of his theory at the expense of his later writings, which explore the application of moral principles to the empirical and historical nature of human beings.

== Post-Kantian idealism ==
The reception of Kant's philosophy was profoundly shaped by the French Revolution. The "all-destroying" Kant was seen as the philosophical equivalent of the Jacobins, and his call for autonomy was understood as a call for a political and social revolution in Germany. His philosophy provided a new vocabulary for expressing the "dual consciousness" of the modern subject, torn between a deterministic empirical self and a free, noumenal self. However, Kant's philosophy also left behind a crucial dualism between the phenomenal world of appearances and the unknowable noumenal world of things-in-themselves. This distinction became a central point of contention for his successors, who felt that Kant's critique was "not critical enough". If the thing-in-itself is truly unknowable, skeptics argued, then one cannot even claim that it exists or that it "affects" the senses to produce our experience. This problem threatened to collapse transcendental idealism back into a form of subjective idealism, where only minds and their ideas exist.

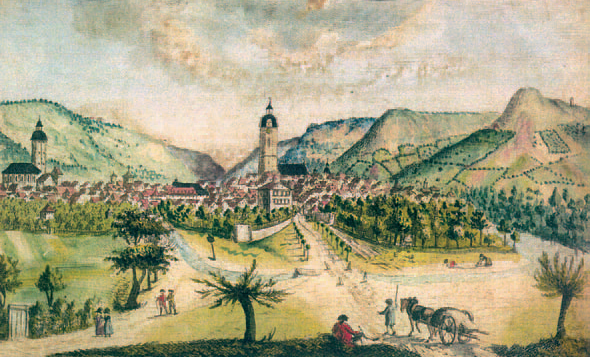
Depiction of Jena in 1790

The major figures after Kant—Johann Gottlieb Fichte, Friedrich Wilhelm Joseph Schelling, and Georg Wilhelm Friedrich Hegel—all sought to overcome this dualism while preserving the modern commitment to freedom and rationality. Their different responses to the problem of the thing-in-itself defined the development of German idealism. The period between Kant's Critique of Pure Reason (1781) and Hegel's Phenomenology of Spirit (1807) was marked by a remarkable intensity of intellectual exchange and rapid conceptual development, as each thinker built upon and challenged the work of their predecessors. The movement was centered in a few key cities, particularly the university town of Jena, which in the 1790s became the site of an "unprecedented cultural revolution" that brought together the leading idealist philosophers with a generation of literary figures who gave birth to German Romanticism.

=== Skeptical challenges and the turn to system ===
The idealists' ambition to construct a complete philosophical system was a response to the profound skeptical challenges of the era. The ancient problem of justification known as the Agrippan trilemma—which argues that any attempt at justification leads to an infinite regress, a vicious circle, or an arbitrary assumption—threatened to undermine the entire Enlightenment project. The philosopher Friedrich Heinrich Jacobi argued that the consistent pursuit of rational justification would lead to a deterministic, fatalistic system like Baruch Spinoza's, which he termed "nihilism"—the annihilation of individual freedom and the meaningfulness of everyday life. The post-Kantian idealists, therefore, saw the task of philosophy as constructing a system that could defeat skepticism and nihilism by providing an absolute, self-grounding foundation for knowledge and freedom. Their "all or nothing" approach was rooted in the conviction that only a complete, systematic philosophy derived from a single principle could provide such a foundation.

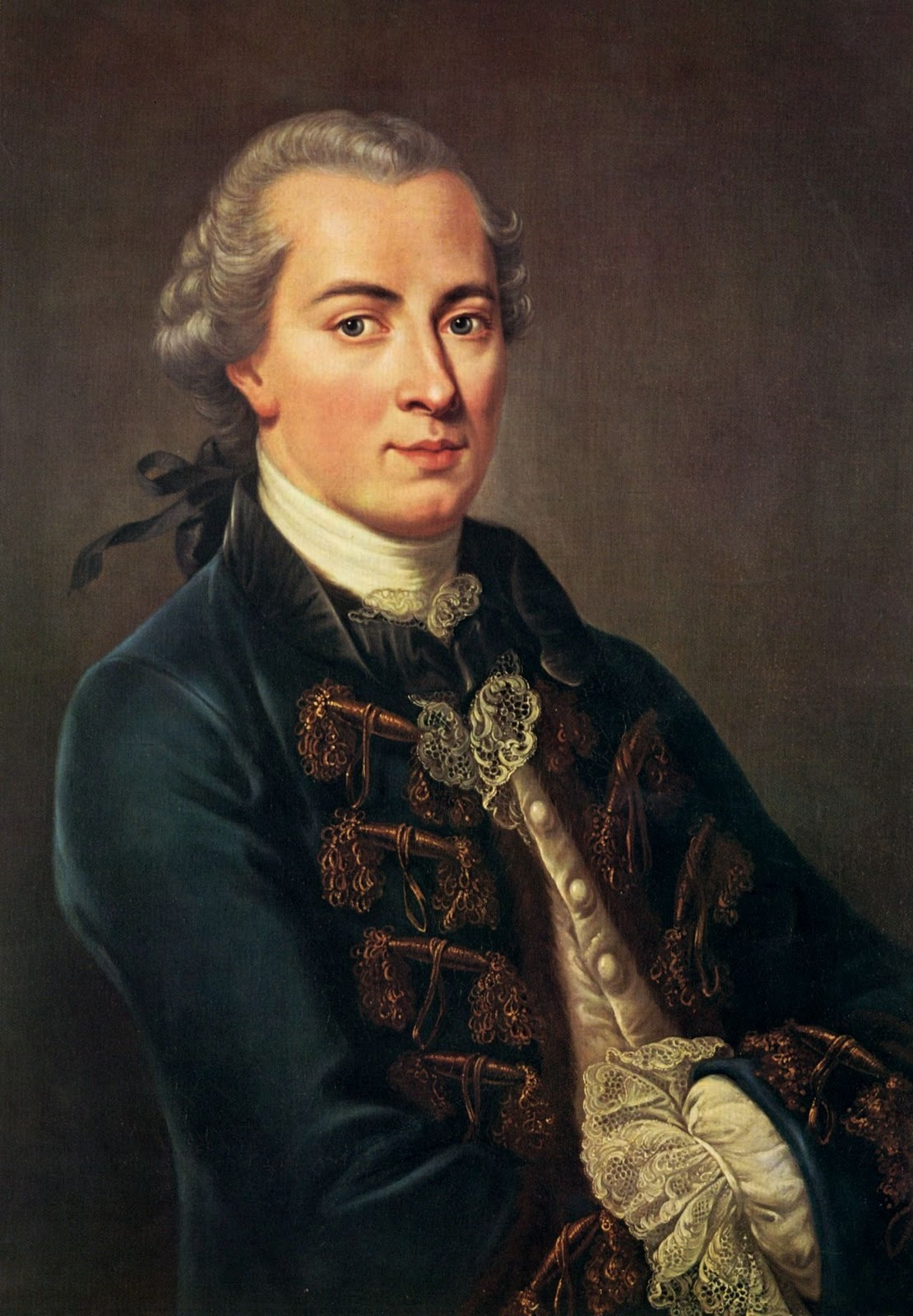
Friedrich Heinrich Jacobi

Jacobi's critique of Kant was particularly influential. He argued that Kant's position was internally contradictory: to enter Kant's system, one must presuppose that unknowable things-in-themselves cause our sensory impressions; but once inside the system, one must deny this, since the category of causality can only be applied to objects of experience (phenomena), not to things-in-themselves. As he famously put it, "without that presupposition I could not enter into the system, but with it I could not stay within it". Jacobi concluded that Kant's philosophy was a form of subjective idealism that could not justify belief in an external world, and that the only alternative to nihilism was a non-rational "leap of faith" (salto mortale) in the existence of things, oneself, and God. Gottlob Ernst Schulze (writing anonymously as "Aenesidemus") launched a similar attack, arguing that Kant had failed to refute Humean skepticism. Schulze contended that his "critical" philosophy still made dogmatic claims about the structure of the mind that could not be justified.

A third skeptical voice was that of Salomon Maimon, a Lithuanian-Jewish philosopher whose work Kant himself highly esteemed. Maimon raised what he called the "quid facti" question: while Kant had asked "quid juris" (by what right do we apply pure concepts to experience?), Maimon questioned whether we, in fact, ever do. He argued that Kant had failed to prove that we actually have "experience" in the strong sense of cognition involving the necessary and universal application of categories. Our judgments, Maimon contended, might be nothing more than Humean psychological associations. Maimon also proposed a "general antinomy of thinking": the irresolvable conflict between the demand for a complete, intellectual form and the reality of a given, sensible matter. This "actuality problem" was a profound challenge that later idealists, particularly Fichte, took as a central task to overcome.

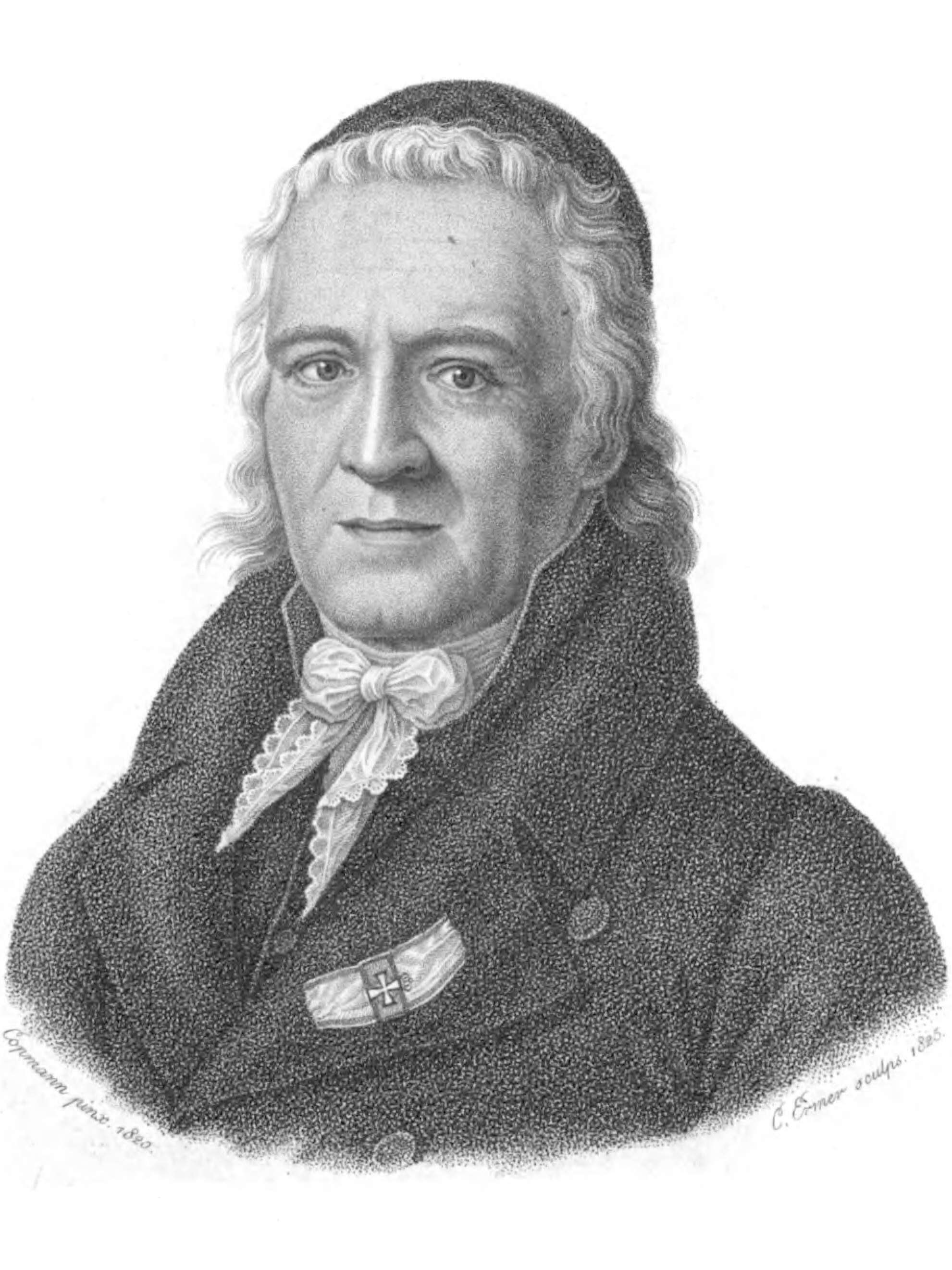
Karl Leonhard Reinhold

In response to these skeptical challenges, Kant's supporter Karl Leonhard Reinhold argued that the solution was to make Kant's philosophy truly scientific and systematic. He introduced a demand for "premises that were absolutely certain; arguments that were absolutely unified, comprehensive, and rigorously deduced; and conclusions that absolutely excluded unknowable transcendent features". To do this, he proposed a single, unassailable foundational principle from which the entire system of knowledge could be rigorously deduced: a "principle of consciousness" in which "representation is distinguished through the subject from both object and subject and is referred to both". Fichte, agreeing with Schulze's critique that this principle was unjustified, developed a more radical approach.

=== Fichte's Wissenschaftslehre ===
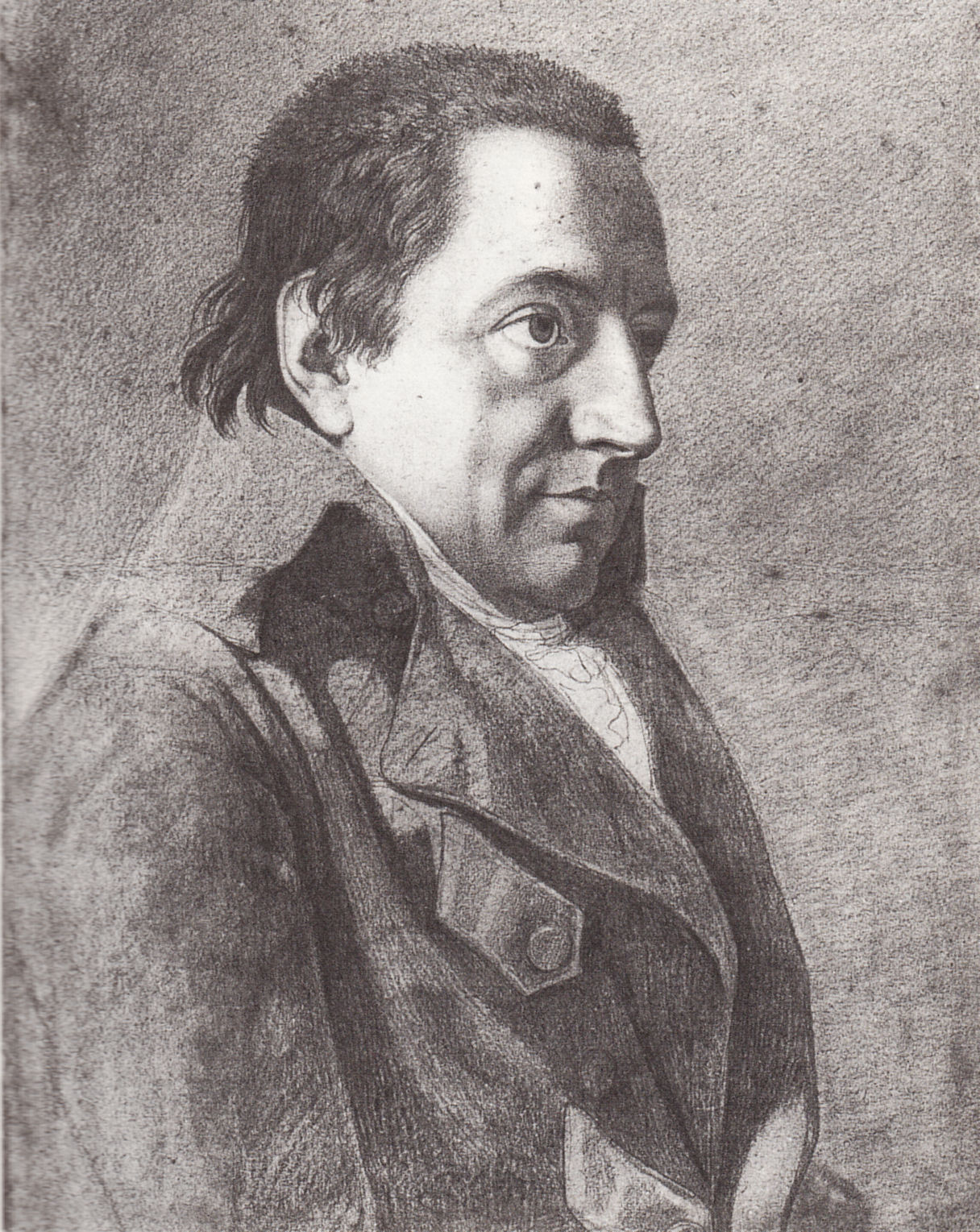
Johann Gottlieb Fichte sought to systematize Kant's philosophy by deriving all of experience from a single foundational principle: the self-consciousness of the "I".

Johann Gottlieb Fichte (1762–1814) sought to "complete and perfect" Kant's project by placing it on what he believed was a more secure foundation. Rejecting Kant's dualism and the thing-in-itself as a "piece of whimsy", Fichte developed a form of idealism centered on the "I" or self-consciousness. He argued that the most certain, immediate reality is not a given fact (Tatsache), but a "deed-act" (Tathandlung), accessible only through a non-sensible "intellectual intuition": the free, spontaneous activity of the self-conscious subject. Fichte understood this intellectual intuition not as a mystical insight, but as the immediate, first-personal self-awareness that is a necessary condition for any rational deliberation or action, which could serve as the "unassailable first principle" for all philosophy.

In his major work, the Wissenschaftslehre (Science of Knowledge, 1794/1795), Fichte argued that self-consciousness is an act of "self-positing". The "I posits itself". For the I to posit itself, however, it must posit a limit to itself, something that it is not: the "Not-I". This Not-I is not a mind-independent reality, but a "check" (Anstoß) posited by the I's own activity. This posited Not-I is what we experience as the external world. Thus, Fichte's system explains all essential features of experience, including the natural world, as necessary conditions for the possibility of self-consciousness.

Fichte defined freedom as the ability of the I to be an active, rational agent, striving to overcome the limits of the Not-I. His philosophy is best described as an "ethical idealism" in which the world ought to be ideal, a goal for moral activity. Idealism becomes a ceaseless striving (Streben) to make the world conform to the demands of reason. This freedom, he argued, is not an individual possession but a communal achievement. Self-consciousness is only possible through a "summons" from another free being, which requires a community of rational agents who recognize each other (Anerkennung) and respect each other's rights. Fichte's insistence on a radical, anti-clerical interpretation of this philosophy in his public lectures led to the Atheism Controversy of 1798–1799, which resulted in his dismissal from the University of Jena.

=== Schelling's philosophy of identity ===
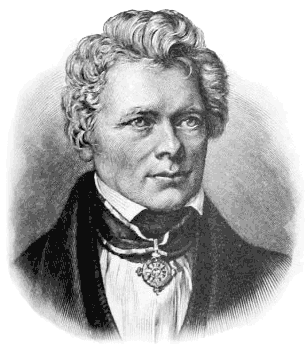
Friedrich Wilhelm Joseph Schelling complemented transcendental idealism with a "philosophy of nature," viewing mind and nature as manifestations of a single "Absolute".

Friedrich Wilhelm Joseph Schelling (1775–1854) was initially a follower of Fichte but soon developed his own distinctive system. He criticized Fichte's "subjective idealism" as one-sided, arguing that its exclusive focus on the self-conscious subject made the "lack of a well-founded philosophy of nature" apparent. Fichte's philosophy, Schelling argued, accounted for the relationship between subjectivity and objectivity, but not for their ultimate origin. Schelling proposed that philosophy needed to complement Fichte's transcendental idealism (which explains the objective from the subjective) with a Naturphilosophie (which explains the subjective from the objective), as developed in works such as First Outline of a System of the Philosophy of Nature (1799). His project was directly inspired by section 76 of Kant's Critique of Judgment, which he interpreted as revealing Kant's proximity to Spinoza's view of an underlying unity of nature and spirit.

Schelling's "philosophy of identity" posited a single, underlying, monistic reality which he called "the Absolute". The Absolute is neither subject nor object, but the undifferentiated identity of both. From this Absolute, both the conscious subject and the objective natural world emerge as two distinct but related "poles" or manifestations. Unlike Fichte's passive Not-I, Schelling's nature is a dynamic, organic, and self-organizing process, a "self-moving whole" that gives rise to mind and self-consciousness. Schelling's "absolute idealism" thus sought a synthesis of idealism and realism, a union of Fichte and Spinoza, asserting an "underlying identity of nature as implicit rationality and of mind as explicit rationality".

Schelling argued that this Absolute identity could not be grasped by conceptual philosophy, but could be directly experienced through "intellectual intuition" and, most importantly, through art. The work of art, for Schelling, is a concrete embodiment of the reconciliation of the conscious and the unconscious, freedom and necessity, subject and object. Like Fichte, Schelling also struggled to reconcile his monism with human freedom, which he saw as necessary to explain the existence of evil. In his later work, he located this freedom in a timeless, "initial choice of character" made by each individual.

=== Hegel's absolute idealism ===
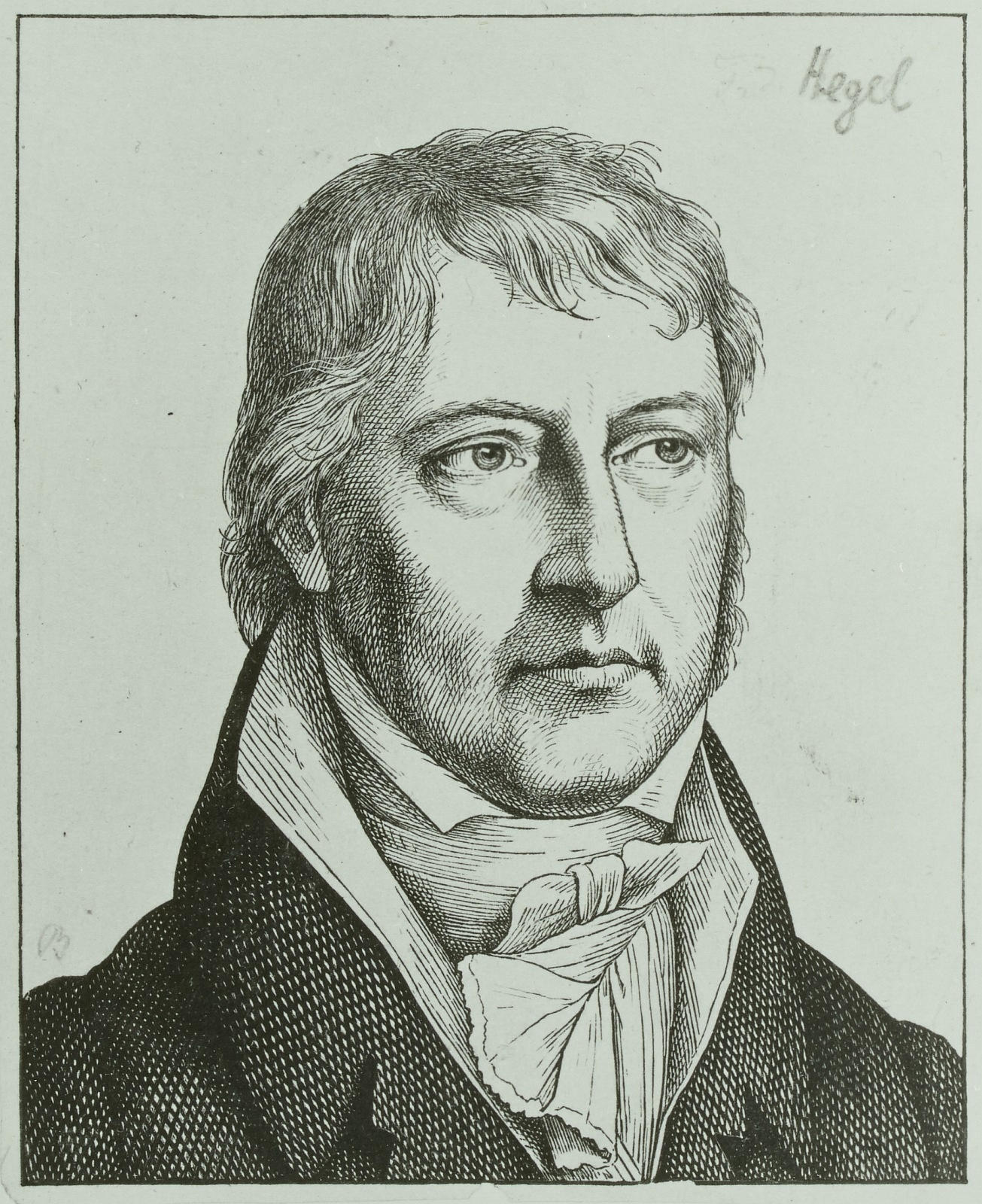
Georg Wilhelm Friedrich Hegel is considered the culminating figure of the movement. His system aimed to overcome all dualisms through a presuppositionless, dialectical science.

Georg Wilhelm Friedrich Hegel (1770–1831) is the most influential figure of German idealism. He argued that his predecessors—Kant, Fichte, and the skeptics—had all failed to be sufficiently critical because they uncritically presupposed a fundamental dualism between the subject and the object. Hegel's project was to overcome all such dualisms by developing a "presuppositionless" philosophy. Drawing on Friedrich Hölderlin's critique of Fichte, Hegel reconceptualized the primordial unity of being not as an unknowable ground, but as an intersubjective unity constituted by patterns of mutual recognition. Inspired by Goethe's work on metamorphosis, Hegel reconceived the absolute not as a foundational principle, but as a result: a self-developing whole that only becomes what it is through a historical process of self-articulation. A key part of his approach was to confront the problem of "historical relativity" by assimilating it: Hegel argued that by understanding the historical development of thought, philosophy could remove the contingency of its own historical standpoint and arrive at an absolute perspective.

Hegel's first major work, The Phenomenology of Spirit (1807), is an introduction to his system. It traces the development of "consciousness" through a series of "shapes" or self-understandings. Each shape of consciousness (e.g., sense-certainty, master-slave dialectic, unhappy consciousness) discovers internal contradictions between its claim to knowledge and its actual experience, which logically compels it to move to a more sophisticated shape. This dialectical process culminates in "absolute knowing", the standpoint at which consciousness recognizes that the distinction between thought and being is overcome, and that the rational structure of thought is the rational structure of reality itself. The dialectical progression of the Phenomenology can be seen as an elaborate response to skepticism, which Hegel called a form of "thoroughgoing nihilism".

Diagram illustrating Hegel's system, which includes philosophies of logic, nature, and spirit

At this point, systematic philosophy can begin. In developing his system, Hegel took "Schelling's philosophy of identity a step further by presenting detailed arguments, with a more intricate dialectical structure, for each of the stages in the development of nature and history". The system, outlined in Hegel's Encyclopedia of the Philosophical Sciences (1817), has three parts:

1. The Science of Logic articulates the purely conceptual structure of being itself, the "determinations of thought" or categories that are also the fundamental determinations of actuality. It begins with the most indeterminate concept, "being", and dialectically unfolds into a comprehensive system of categories.
2. The Philosophy of Nature examines the actualization of this conceptual structure in the spatiotemporal world. For Hegel, nature is "the concept" in its externality, and he distinguishes his a priori philosophy of nature from empirical science, which studies the contingent aspects of the natural world.
3. The Philosophy of Spirit traces the emergence of free, thinking beings from nature. Hegel defines freedom not as transcendence of nature, but as reconciliation with it, achieved through a process of social and historical self-development. This reconciliation is achieved progressively through "subjective spirit" (the individual mind), "objective spirit" (social and political institutions like the family, civil society, and the state), and "absolute spirit" (art, religion, and philosophy), where Spirit comes to fully comprehend its own freedom.

Hegel argued that "what is rational is actual; and what is actual is rational". His philosophy aimed to demonstrate the rational necessity underlying history and actuality, and to provide a comprehensive understanding of freedom as realized within modern ethical and political life. The "actuality" of a concept, for Hegel, is not a matter of its having instances, but of the concept "giving itself actuality" through a process of self-determination, an idea that radicalizes Kant's notion of the "fact of reason".

=== The broader movement and Romanticism ===
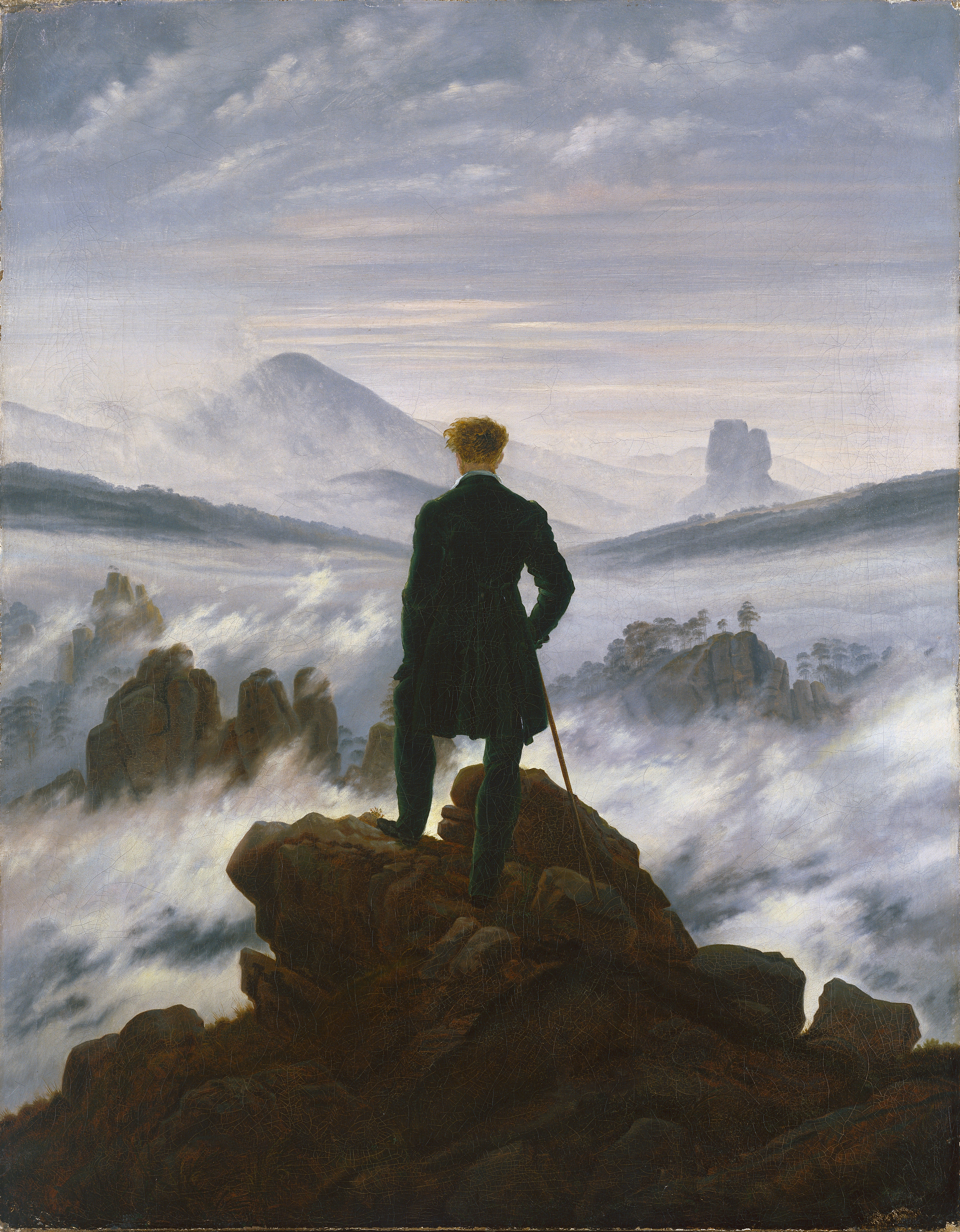
Wanderer above the Sea of Fog (1818), by Caspar David Friedrich. German Romantic philosophy explores the modern experience of alienation and the longing for a reconciliation of freedom and unity.

The period of German idealism was not limited to the major philosophers, but was part of a broader cultural and intellectual movement that included the literary figures of Weimar Classicism and the German Romantics. The cultural ferment of the late 18th century, centered in the university town of Jena, saw an "unprecedented cultural revolution" fueled by the collaboration of Johann Wolfgang von Goethe and Friedrich Schiller, the birth of German Romanticism, and the rapid development of post-Kantian philosophy. The literary giants of the era—Schiller, Friedrich Hölderlin, Friedrich Schlegel, and Novalis—developed their own philosophical views in intense dialogue with the idealists.

A key development was the emergence of Frühromantik or Early Romanticism, a movement associated with the Schlegel brothers, Novalis, Hölderlin, and Friedrich Schleiermacher. The early romantics shared the idealists' desire to overcome Kantian dualisms, but many were critical of the systematic and foundationalist ambitions of Reinhold, Fichte, and Hegel. They developed an "antisystematic" strand of thought that emphasized the limits of reason and the role of feeling and irony in pointing toward an absolute that could not be fully captured by philosophy. They often expressed their ideas in non-technical forms such as poems, novels, dialogues, and aphorisms, in an attempt to develop a "new kind of philosophy and antiphilosophy" that made a point of emphasizing "the limits of philosophic systems as such and of rationality in general." This movement is distinct from the later, often more conservative and nationalistic, Late Romanticism.

A distinct approach was also developed by Goethe, who sought to adapt Spinoza's philosophy to empirical science. Inspired by Kant's Critique of Judgment, he developed a methodology for a non-discursive, "intuitive understanding" of nature, which he applied in his scientific work on botany and optics.

== Legacy ==
German idealism effectively ended with Hegel's death in 1831, but its influence on subsequent philosophy was immense. Hegel's system was widely seen as the culmination of the movement, and much of 19th-century philosophy was defined by reactions to it. The "collapse" of idealism gave rise to two main streams of thought: philosophies of praxis that focused on political and social transformation, and philosophies of science that aligned with positivism and the empirical sciences. Paradoxically, both of these new directions were "fed by ideas that had grown in the very lap of idealism". The turn to praxis extended the Hegelian system's all-embracing claims beyond theory, while the renewed focus on empirical science was a return to the premises of Kant's critique. Hegel's claim that the history of philosophy had reached its end with his system was often interpreted as a claim to have exhausted all philosophical possibility. However, it can also be understood as the claim that philosophy had completed a historical cycle by overcoming the subject-object dualism that had structured modern thought, thereby opening a new field for philosophical inquiry.

=== Critiques and alternatives ===
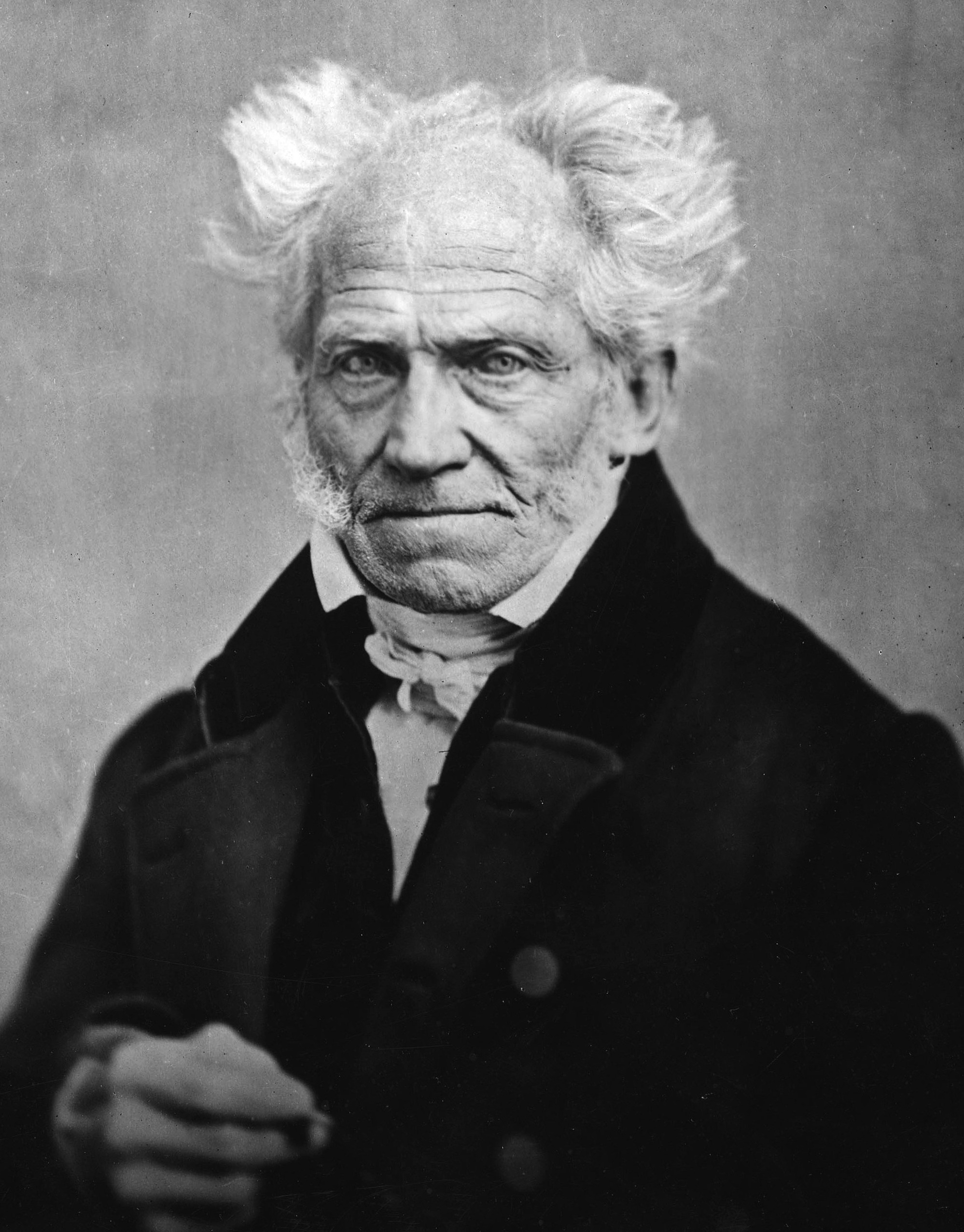
Arthur Schopenhauer

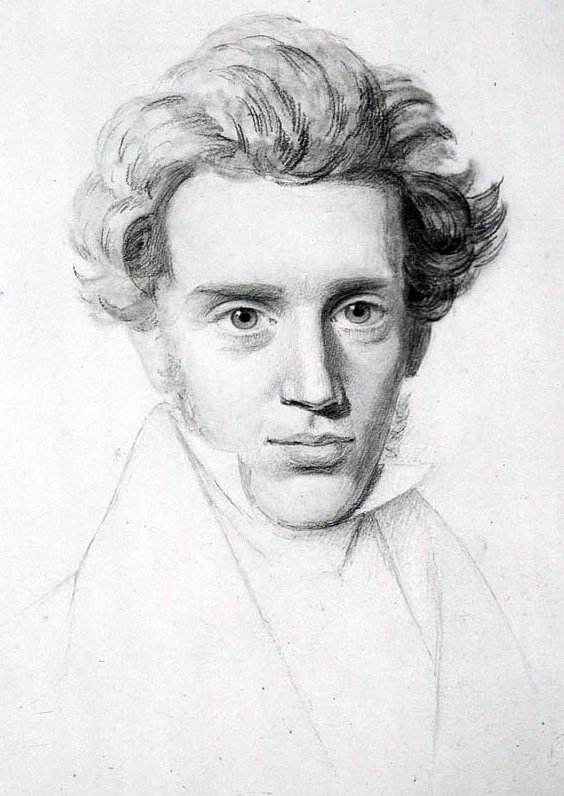
Søren Kierkegaard

Ludwig Feuerbach

Karl Marx

- Early Romanticism: Figures like Schiller, Schlegel and Novalis, who were influential on the young Schelling, developed a critique of philosophy's ability to grasp the absolute. They argued that the absolute truth was a sublime, transcendent ground that could not be captured by literal, conceptual prose. They elevated art and poetry above philosophy as a means of indirectly evoking this truth, and championed a stance of "Romantic irony" toward all finite commitments.
- Arthur Schopenhauer: Schopenhauer's philosophy was a pessimistic alternative to the idealism of his contemporaries. He accepted Kant's distinction between the phenomenal world and the noumenal, but argued that the thing-in-itself was not unknowable. Instead, he identified it with the "will"—a blind, irrational, and ceaseless striving that underlies all of reality. This pessimistic metaphysics led him to reject the optimistic rationalism of Hegel and to propose an ethic of resignation and aesthetic contemplation as the only escape from suffering.
- Schelling's late philosophy: In the 1840s, a decade after Hegel's death, an older Schelling was invited to Berlin to combat the influence of Hegelianism. He argued that Hegel's "negative" philosophy, which dealt only with conceptual essences, was incapable of accounting for the contingent fact of existence. He called for a "positive" philosophy, grounded in religious mythology and revelation, to explain the creation of the world. Schelling's final critique, which argued that Hegel's system could not account for the possibility of evil, marked a significant break. For Schelling, the free creation of the world also implied the freedom to repudiate that freedom—the freedom for evil—which could not be comprehended within a rational system oriented toward the good.
- Post-Hegelian thinkers: Schelling's critique, though not his proposed solution, proved highly influential. Thinkers in his Berlin audience, such as Søren Kierkegaard and Friedrich Engels, rejected Hegel's a priori system in favor of approaches centered on individual existence and empirical facts. Despite their critiques, these thinkers remained profoundly shaped by Hegel's dialectical method and his account of historical self-realization.
  - Ludwig Feuerbach and David Strauss transformed the study of religion into an anthropological inquiry into human self-projection, a project that took its cues from Hegel's analysis of the "unhappy consciousness".
  - Karl Marx inverted Hegel's idealism, replacing the dialectic of concepts with a "dialectical materialism" that focused on the development of economic forces of production. His theory of "historical materialism" adopted the fundamental dialectical structure of Hegel's philosophy of history, reinterpreting it in economic terms. He famously declared, "Philosophers have only interpreted the world in various ways; the point is to change it."
  - Kierkegaard rejected the universalism of Hegel's system, emphasizing the personal, subjective, and non-rational "leap of faith" required for religious existence and authentic individuality. His analysis of the "stages on life's way" (aesthetic, ethical, religious) parallels the dialectical progression of Hegel's Phenomenology, but concludes in the irreducible paradox of faith rather than the reconciliation of reason.

=== Twentieth-century reception ===
Despite these critiques, the influence of German idealism persisted. In the 1860s, the neo-Kantian movement emerged with the slogan "Back to Kant!", seeking to return to a more modest, epistemological role for philosophy in grounding the empirical sciences. At the end of the 19th century, British idealism became a dominant force in Britain and America, and Hegel's philosophy of history profoundly affected political theory.

In the 20th century, German idealism, and especially Hegel, became a crucial point of origin for many schools of thought in continental philosophy. The phenomenologist Maurice Merleau-Ponty noted that "All the great philosophical ideas of the past century – the philosophies of Marx and Nietzsche, phenomenology, German existentialism, and psychoanalysis – had their beginnings in Hegel". The French reception of Hegel in the 1930s and 1940s, particularly through the lectures of Alexandre Kojève and the work of Jean Hyppolite, established a "Hegelian paradigm" that shaped much of post-war thought. Kojève's interpretation of the Phenomenology as a narrative of human history culminating in the "end of history" was highly influential, but his focus on the master-slave dialectic led to a reading of Hegel that emphasized conflict, negation, and death. This, combined with the historical experience of totalitarianism, led to an association of Hegel's philosophy with the logic of totalizing state power, a view articulated in different ways by Emmanuel Levinas, Georges Bataille, and Jean-Paul Sartre.

Post-structuralist thinkers of the 1960s and beyond developed their theories in a complex and often critical engagement with this Hegelian legacy. Jacques Derrida's method of deconstruction sought to expose the "logocentric" and totalizing tendencies in the philosophical tradition, with Hegel serving as its ultimate representative. At the same time, this critique was accompanied by an intensive re-reading of Hegel's texts, as seen in Derrida's Glas, as well as in the work of Catherine Malabou, who developed the concept of plasticity from Hegel's philosophy. Other thinkers turned to different figures in the idealist tradition as alternatives to what they saw as Hegel's suffocating system. In the 1980s, a "return to Kant" was notable in the work of Derrida, Jean-François Lyotard, and Michel Foucault, who engaged with Kant's theories of critique, the sublime, and the nature of the Enlightenment.

More recently, Schelling has experienced a resurgence, with his philosophy of nature and his critique of Hegelian rationalism providing resources for contemporary movements such as speculative realism and the work of thinkers like Slavoj Žižek and Iain Hamilton Grant. In the English-speaking world, the influence of idealism has become increasingly widespread in analytic philosophy, with figures such as Pittsburgh Hegelians Robert Brandom and John McDowell engaging with idealist concepts. This enduring engagement demonstrates that interest in German idealism, far from diminishing, has "grown exponentially in recent years", as its concepts continue to inform contemporary debates.

== See also ==
- Right Hegelians / Left Hegelians
- Speculative philosophy
- St. Louis Hegelians
- Teleological idealism
- Timeline of German idealism
- Transcendentalism
