= Pantheism controversy =

1780s religious debates in Germany

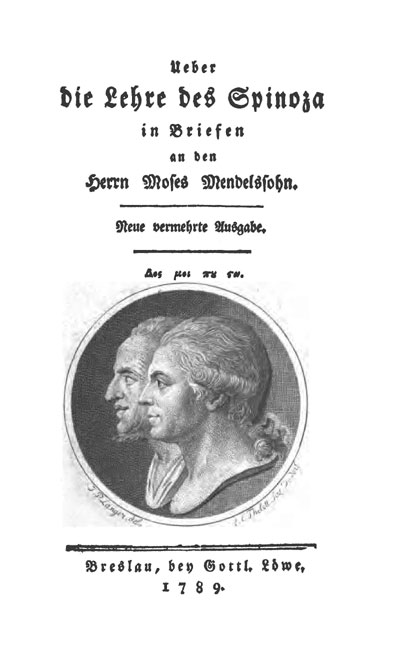
Über die Lehre des Spinoza, 2nd ed. (1789)

The pantheism controversy (German: Pantheismusstreit), also known as Spinozismusstreit or Spinozastreit, refers to the 1780s debates in German intellectual life that discussed the merits of Spinoza's "pantheistic" conception of God. This began as a disagreement between Friedrich Heinrich Jacobi and Moses Mendelssohn over their understanding of Gotthold Ephraim Lessing's Spinozist beliefs. Their personal disagreement became a wider public controversy when, in 1785, Jacobi published his correspondence with Mendelssohn. This started a series of public discussions on the matter.

== History ==
A conversation between the German philosopher Friedrich Heinrich Jacobi and the German dramatist Gotthold Ephraim Lessing in 1780 led Jacobi to a protracted study of Baruch Spinoza's works. Lessing had avowed that he knew no philosophy, in the true sense of that word, save Spinozism.

Jacobi's Über die Lehre des Spinozas (1st ed. 1785, 2nd ed. 1789) expressed sharply and clearly his strenuous objection to a dogmatic system in philosophy and drew upon him the vigorous enmity of the Berlin group, led by Moses Mendelssohn. Jacobi claimed that Spinoza's doctrine was pure materialism, because all Nature and God are said to be nothing but extended substance. This, for Jacobi, was the result of Enlightenment rationalism and it would finally end in absolute atheism. Mendelssohn disagreed with Jacobi, saying that there is no actual difference between theism and pantheism. The entire issue became a major intellectual and religious concern for European civilization at the time, which Immanuel Kant rejected, as he thought that attempts to conceive of transcendent reality would lead to antinomies in thought.

== Aftermath ==
Jacobi was ridiculed for trying to reintroduce into philosophy the antiquated notion of unreasoning belief, was denounced as an enemy of reason, as a pietist, and as a Jesuit in disguise, and was especially attacked for his use of the ambiguous term Glaube (German: "belief, faith").

Willi Goetschel argues that Jacobi's publication significantly shaped the reception of Spinoza's doctrine for centuries following its publication, obscuring the nuance of Spinoza's philosophic work.

Jacobi's next important work, David Hume on Faith, or Idealism and Realism (David Hume über den Glauben oder Idealismus und Realismus, 1787), was an attempt to show not only that the term Glaube had been used by the most eminent writers to denote what he had employed it for in the Letters on Spinoza, but that the nature of the cognition of facts, as opposed to the construction of inferences, could not be otherwise expressed. In this writing, and especially in the appendix, Jacobi came into contact with Kant's critical philosophy, and subjected the Kantian view of knowledge to searching examination.

== See also ==
- Atheism dispute
