= Atheism dispute =

Significant German cultural history event

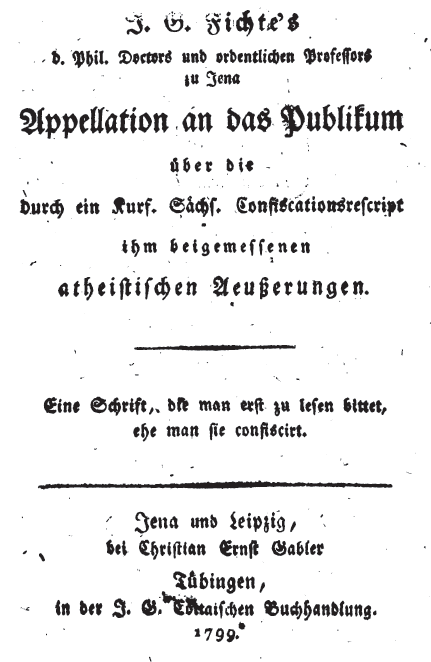
Fichte's "Appeal to the Public" ("Appellation an das Publikum über die durch Churf. Sächs. Confiscationsrescript ihm beigemessenen atheistischen Aeußerungen. Eine Schrift, die man zu lesen bittet, ehe man sie confiscirt," 1799)

The atheism dispute (German: Atheismusstreit) was an event in German cultural history that lasted between 1798 and 1800 and had an effect on the German philosophy in the late 18th and the early 19th centuries.

== History ==
In 1798, Johann Gottlieb Fichte was accused of atheism after he had published that year his essay Ueber den Grund unsers Glaubens an eine göttliche Weltregierung ("On the Ground of Our Belief in a Divine World-Governance"), which he had written in response to Friedrich Karl Forberg's essay "Development of the Concept of Religion" in his Philosophical Journal. Forberg had claimed that unbelievers could be moral if they act as if an all-seeing and punishing God exists. In his brief essay, Fichte attempted to sketch some of his preliminary ideas on philosophy of religion formulated within his Wissenschaftslehre (doctrine of science). He characterised God as the living moral order of the world.

"On the Ground of Our Belief in a Divine World-Governance" provoked the publication of an anonymous essay that accused both Fichte and Forberg of atheism and called for Fichte's dismissal from his post at the University of Jena, in the Duchy of Saxe-Weimar. In the wake of the dispute, many essays were published supporting and opposing Fichte and a defence by Fichte himself.

Friedrich Heinrich Jacobi eventually published his famous open letter to Fichte, in which he equated philosophy in general and Fichte's transcendental philosophy in particular with "nihilism".

Fichte was forced to resign his position at Jena and to flee to Berlin, nominally as a result of statements in which he had threatened to resign if he was subjected to official government reprimand. Fichte, however, wrote later: "It is not my atheism which they are persecuting, it is my democratism. The former only provided the excuse". The documents confirm that: The Weimar minister Christian Gottlob Voigt wrote to his colleague, Johann Wolfgang Goethe that the letter in which Fichte threatened to resign if he were reprimanded by Duke Carl August had given only the "pretense" that the ministers had sought to "get rid of" Fichte. Saxony and Prussia had threatened to prohibit their subjects from enrolling at the University of Jena if Fichte continued teaching there, and Russia and Austria had already introduced such a boycott. The real reason for those governments' continuing unhappiness was his two 1793 anonymously-published books in which he had shown sympathy with the French Revolution, Zurückforderung der Denkfreiheit von den Fürsten Europens, die sie bisher unterdrückten and Beiträge zur Berichtigung der Urteile des Publikums über die Französische Revolution. Goethe later retrieved his letters to Voigt regarding Fichte's dismissal and destroyed them. The University of Jena suffered the loss of many students and some academics after Fichte's dismissal.

== See also ==
- Age of Enlightenment
- Pantheism controversy

== Bibliography ==
- J. G. Fichte: "On the Ground of Our Belief in a Divine World-Governance"
- F. K. Forberg: "Development of the Concept of Religion"
- Anonymous: "A Father's Letter to his Student Son about Fichte's and Forberg's Atheism
- Frederick Augustus I of Saxony: "Saxon Letter of Requisition to the Weimar Court"
- Karl August, Grand Duke of Saxe-Weimar-Eisenach: "Weimar Rescript to the University of Jena"
- J. G. Fichte: "Appeal to the Public" ("Appellation an das Publikum über die durch Churf. Sächs. Confiscationsrescript ihm beigemessenen atheistischen Aeußerungen. Eine Schrift, die man zu lesen bittet, ehe man sie confsicirt"), 1799
- K. L. Reinhold: "Letter to Fichte"
- J. G. Fichte: "Juridical Defense"
- Ernst Ludwig II, Duke of Saxe-Meiningen: "Gotha Rescript to the University of Jena"
- Students of the University of Jena: "First Petition to Karl August of Saxony–Weimar–Eisenach"
- Karl August: "First Reply to the University of Jena"
- Students of the University of Jena: "Second Petition to Karl August of Saxony–Weimar–Eisenach"
- Karl August: "Second Reply to the University of Jena"
- J. G. Fichte: "From a Private Letter"
- F. H. Jacobi: "Letter on Fichte"
