= Foundations of the Science of Knowledge =

Book by Johann Gottlieb Fichte

- Author: Johann Gottlieb Fichte
- Original title: Grundlage der gesammten^{a} Wissenschaftslehre
- Language: German
- Subject: Epistemology
- Publication date: 1794/1795
- Publication place: Germany
- Media type: Print
- Pages: 324 (1982 Cambridge University Press edition)
- ISBN: 978-0521270502
- ^{a} Gesamten in contemporary German.

Foundations of the Science of Knowledge (German: Grundlage der gesammten Wissenschaftslehre) is a 1794/1795 book by the German philosopher Johann Gottlieb Fichte.

Based on lectures he had delivered as a professor of philosophy at the University of Jena Fichte created his own system of transcendental philosophy in this book.

== Overview ==
Science of Knowledge first established Fichte's independent philosophy. The contents of the book, divided into eleven sections, were crucial in the way the thinker grounded philosophy as – for the first time – a part of epistemology. In this book Fichte also claimed that an "experiencer" must be tacitly aware that he is experiencing in order to lead to "noticing". This articulated his view that an individual's experience is essentially the experiencing of the act of experiencing so that his so-called "Absolutely Unconditioned Principle" of all experience is that "the I posits itself".

== Translations ==
An incomplete English translation by Adolph Ernst Kroeger was first published in 1868 as The Science of Knowledge. The first complete English translation, by Peter Heath, was published in 1970. A new English translation by Daniel Breazeale, accompanied by an extensive introduction, scholarly annotations, and related texts, was published in 2021.

== Reception ==
In 1798 the German Romantic thinker Friedrich Schlegel identified the Wissenschaftslehre together with the French Revolution and Johann Wolfgang von Goethe's Wilhelm Meister's Apprenticeship, as "the most important trend-setting events (Tendenzen) of the age."

Michael Inwood believes that the work is close in spirit to the works of Edmund Husserl, including Ideas (1913) and Cartesian Meditations (1931).

The Wissenschaftslehre has been described by Roger Scruton as being both "immensely difficult" and "rough-hewn and uncouth".

== See also ==
- Foundationalism
