= Schlegel =

Schlegel is a Swiss and German occupational surname. The Swiss Schlegel's are heavily clustered in the eastern parts of Switzerland, including canton's of St. Gallen and near the border of Lichtenstein. Notable people with the surname include:

- Anthony Schlegel (born 1981), American football player
- August Wilhelm Schlegel (1767–1845), German poet, brother of Friedrich
- Brad Schlegel (born 1968), Canadian ice hockey player
- Bernhard Schlegel (born 1951), German-Canadian chemist
- Carmela Schlegel (born 1983), Swiss swimmer
- Catharina von Schlegel (1697 – 1777), German hymn writer
- Christoph Schlegel (1613 - 1678) German theologian
- Dorothea von Schlegel (1764–1839), German novelist and translator, wife of Friedrich
- Dorothee Schlegel (born 1959), German politician
- Elfi Schlegel (born 1964), Canadian gymnast and sportscaster
- Friedrich Schlegel (1772–1829), German literary critic, philosopher and Indologist
- Frits Schlegel (1896–1965), Danish architect
- Gustaaf Schlegel (1840–1903), Dutch sinologist and field naturalist
- Hans Schlegel (born 1951), German astronaut
- Helmut Schlegel (born 1943), German Franciscan, priest, author, meditation instructor, songwriter
- Hermann Schlegel (1804–1884), German ornithologist and herpetologist
- Johan Frederik Schlegel (1817–1896), Danish civil servant and Governor-General of the Danish West Indies
- Johann Adolf Schlegel (1721–1793), German poet and clergyman, father of August
- Johann Elias Schlegel (1719–1749), German critic and dramatic poet, brother of Johann Adolf
- John P. Schlegel (1943–2015), President of Creighton University and Jesuit
- Karl Schlegel (aviator) (1893–1918), German World War I flying ace
- Lynda Schlegel-Culver (born 1969), American politician from Pennsylvania
- Margarete Schlegel (1899–1987), German actress
- Martin Schlegel (born 1976), Swiss economist
- Martin Schlegel (theologist) (1581–1640), German Lutheran theologian
- Marvin Schlegel, German athlete
- Norbert Schlegel (born 1961), German football player and coach
- Paul Marquard Schlegel 1605–1653), German anatomist
- Richard Schlegel, American pathologist
- Richard L. Schlegel (1927–2006), American LGBT rights activist
- Rodrigo Schlegel (born 1997), Argentine footballer
- Victor Schlegel (1843–1905), German mathematician

== See also ==
- Karl Schlögel (born 1948), German historian
