= List of translators of William Shakespeare =

This is a list of translators of one or more works of William Shakespeare from Early Modern English into respective languages.

Translator	Target language
A. de Herz	Romanian
Ádám Nádasdy	Hungarian
August Wilhelm Schlegel	German
Avraham Shlonsky	Hebrew
Barbu Solacolu	Romanian
Boris Pasternak	Russian
Cankurd	Kurdish
Carl Abel	German
Carl August Hagberg	Swedish
D. Nanu	Romanian
Dan Duțescu	Romanian
Daniel Efrat	Hebrew
Dmytro Pavlychko	Ukrainian
Dorothea Tieck	German
Eduard Wilhelm Sievers	German
François-Victor Hugo	French
František Doucha	Czech
Friedrich Schiller	German
Gala Galaction	Romanian
Grigore H. Grandea	Romanian
Haralamb Lecca	Romanian
Ioan Barac	Romanian
Ion Vinea	Romanian
Ivane Machabeli	Georgian
Jabra Ibrahim Jabra	Arabic
János Arany	Hungarian
Jaroslav Vrchlický	Czech
Johann Heinrich Voss	German
Johann Joachim Eschenburg	German
Johannes Sløk	Danish
Josef Jiří Kolár	Czech
Josef Kajetán Tyl	Czech
Laxmi Prasad Devkota	Nepali
Leon Levițchi	Romanian
Lucia Demetrius	Romanian
Ludovic Dauș	Romanian
Ludwik Lejzer Zamenhof	Esperanto
Ludwig Berger	German
Maciej Słomczyński	Polish
Maksym Rylsky	Ukrainian
Mărgărita Miller-Verghy	Romanian
Maria Banuș	Romanian
Mark O'Connor	Modern English
Martin Hilský	Czech
Mikhail Lozinsky	Russian
Miroslav Macek	Czech
Mykhailo Starytsky	Ukrainian
Mykola Bazhan	Ukrainian
Mykola Lukash	Ukrainian
Mykola Voronyi	Ukrainian
Panteleimon Kulish	Ukrainian
Păstorel Teodoreanu	Romanian
Paul Celan	German
Petre P. Carp	Romanian
Rainis	Latvian
Ramachandra Deva	Kannada
Salvador Oliva i Llinàs	Catalan
Samuil Marshak	Russian
Stefan George	German
Suman Pokhrel	Nepali
Thomas Brasch	German
Torkom Manoogian	Armenian
Tsubouchi Shōyō	Japanese
Tsuneari Fukuda	Japanese
Tudor Vianu	Romanian
Valeri Petrov	Bulgarian
Vasyl Barka	Ukrainian
Wolf Heinrich Graf von Baudissin	German
Yurii Andrukhovych	Ukrainian
Yuriy Fedkovych	Ukrainian
Zoe Verbiceanu	Romanian

== See also ==
- List of translations of works by William Shakespeare
