= List of translations of works by William Shakespeare =

This is a list of translations of works by William Shakespeare. Each table is arranged alphabetically by the specific work, then by the language of the translation. Translations are then sub-arranged by date of publication (earliest-latest). Where possible, the date of publication given is the date of the first edition by that translator. More modern editions/versions may be available.

== Complete/Selected works ==
Language	Title of Translation	Translator(s)	Place of Publication	Date of Publication	ISBN	WorldCat OCLC	Notes
Albanian	[Works]	Margalina Sina [series editor]	Tirana	1981		82548386	
Armenian	Ընտիր երկեր: երեք հատորով / Ěntir erker: erekʻ hatorov	Khachʻik Dashtentsʻ, Hovhannēs Masēhean	Yerevan	1951		30489507	
Dutch	Tooneelspelen	Bernard Brunius, Albrecht Borchers (publisher)	Amsterdam	1778-82		976703593	
Dutch	Shakespeare's Dramatische werken	Abraham Seyne Kok	Amsterdam	1880		833035215	Utrecht University
Dutch	De werken van William Shakespeare	Leendert Alexander Johannes Burgersdijk	Leiden	1886-1888		781906011	HaithiTrust
Estonian	Kogutud teosed seitsmes köites	Georg Meri	[Tallinn?]	1959-1975		503857461	
French	Œuvres complètes de W. Shakespeare	François-Victor Hugo	[Paris?]	1859-66		191715303	Oxford
German	Shakespeare's dramatische Werke	August Wilhelm Schlegel, Ludwig Tieck		1797–1833			HathiTrust

== Plays ==
Original Specific Work	Language	Title of Translation	Translator(s)	Place of Publication	Date of Publication	ISBN	WorldCat OCLC	Notes
Anthony and Cleopatra	Estonian	Antonius ja Kleopatra	Georg Meri	Tallinn	1946			With: Julius Caesar; Coriolanus
As You Like It	Welsh	Bid Wrth Eich Bodd	J. T. Jones	Caernarfon (2007 reprint)	1983 (published)		12520327	NLW
Coriolanus	Estonian	Coriolanus	Georg Meri	Tallinn	1946			With: Julius Caesar; Antonius ja Kleopatra
Coriolanus	Irish	Coriolanus	Liam Ó Briain	Dublin	1945		18955001	
Cymbeline	Dutch	Cymbeline van Shakspere	Leendert Alexander Johannes Burgersdijk	Utrecht	1878		47793372	HaithiTrust
Cymbeline	Hebrew	סימבלין [Simbelin]	Meir Wieseltier	Tel Aviv	2006	9655121135 9789655121131	234740683	
Hamlet	Afrikaans	Hamlet, prins van Denemarke	L. I. Coertze	Cape Town	1945		7799155	
Hamlet	Afrikaans	Hamlet	Eitemal (Professor W. J. du P. Erlank)	Cape Town	1973	9780624004400 0624004406	79457647	
Hamlet	Albanian	Hamleti, princ i Danemarkes	Fan Stylian Noli	Pristina	1952		863482651	
Hamlet	Arabic	رواية هملت: تمثيلية ذات خمسة فصول [Riwāyat Hamlit: tamthīlīyah dhāt khamsat fuṣūl]	Ṭānyūs ʻAbduh	Cairo	1902		122878679	
Hamlet	Chinese	哈姆莱特 [Hamulaite]	Zhengkun Gu	Beijing	2015	9787513560474	950467481	
Hamlet	Dutch	Hamlet	Peter Verstegen	Amsterdam	2018	9789025370527, 9025370527	1079229341	
Hamlet	Esperanto	Hamleto, Reĝido de Danujo	L.L. Zamenhof		1894			
Hamlet	Estonian	Taani Prints Hamlet	A.F. Tombach-Kaljuvald	Tartu	1930		924373442	
Hamlet	Finnish	Hamlet	Paavo Cajanderin	Charleston	2014	9781502465009		
Hamlet	German	Hamlet	Norbert Greiner	Tübingen	2006	9783860575673	214348716	
Hamlet	Haitian Creole	Hamlèt (Prens Denmak)	Nicole Titus	Cambridge	2014	9781936431199	947047286	
Hamlet	Hindi	Hamlet	Rangeya Raghav	Delhi	2020	9789350642085		
Hamlet	Klingon	The Klingon Hamlet: The Restored Klingon Version	Nick Nicholas Andrew Strader	New York	2000	9780671035785	43443445	Based on the fictional Klingons from Star Trek media.
Hamlet	Korean	햄릿 [Hamlet]	Shin Jeong-ok	Yongin-si	2011	9788979241136	947109703	
Hamlet	Romanian	Tragedia lui Hamlet, prinţ de Danemarca	Vladimir Streinu	Bucharest	1965		935396590	
Hamlet	Russian	Трагическая история Гамлета [Tragicheskaya istoriya Gamleta]	A. Korchevskiĭ	Moscow	2019 [reprinted]	9785751615185	1239954723	
Hamlet	Russian	Гамлет [Gamlet]	Alexey Tsvetkov		2010	9785983791374		With: Macbeth
Hamlet	Spanish	Hamlet	Luis Astrana Marín	Madrid	2011	9788420651415	804915312	
Hamlet	Tamil	ஹாம்லெட் [Hamlet]	Dr. Justice S. Maharajan	Chennai	2020	9789390053049		
Hamlet	Welsh	Hamlet, Tywysog Denmarc: cyfieithiad	D. Griffiths	Wrexham	1864		45657627	NLW
Hamlet	Welsh	Trasiedi Hamlet, Tywysog Denmarc	J. T. Jones	Aberystwyth	1960		30254777	NLW
Hamlet	Welsh	Hamlet	Gareth Miles and Michael Bogdanov	Cardiff	2004			NLW
Julius Caesar	Albanian	Jul Qesari	Fan Stylian Noli	Pristina	1968		503879169	
Julius Caesar	Dutch	Julius Cæsar	Karel ten Bruggencate	Groningen	1919		901022209	
Julius Caesar	Estonian	Julius Caesar	Georg Meri	Tallinn	1946			With: Antonius ja Kleopatra; Coriolanus
Julius Caesar	Hausa	Jarmai Ziza	Mahmoon Baba-Ahmed		2016	9781541182530		
Julius Caesar	Latin	Julius Cæsar	Henry Denison	Oxford	1856		8973465	Google Books
King Lear	Afrikaans	Koning Lear	Uys Krige	Cape Town	1971	9780798600040 0798600047	749989388	
King Lear	Afrikaans	Koning Lear	Deryck Uys	[Johannesburg?]	2023[?]	9780639734750		TCC Press
King Lear	Arabic	مأساة الملك لير / Maʼsāt al-Malik Līr	Jabrā Ibrāhīm Jabrā	Beirut	1968		863269869	
King Lear	Arabic	الملك لير / al-Malik Līr	Muḥammad Muṣṭafá Badawī, Muḥammad Ismāʿīl al-Muwāfī	Kuwait	1976		122864360	
King Lear	Dutch	Koning Lear, treurspel	M.G. de Cambon	S-'Gravenhague	1786		458827860	Early Dutch Books Online
King Lear	Estonian	Kuningas Lear: draama viies aktis	Mihkel Jürna	Tartu	1926		77979828	
King Lear	Galician	Rei Lear	Eduardo Alonso, Cándido Pazó	Vigo	1998	8483023180	317393647	
Macbeth	Afrikaans	Macbeth	Eitemal (Professor W. J. du P. Erlank)	Cape Town	1965		236076023	
Macbeth	Afrikaans	Macbeth	Deryck Uys	[Johannesburg?]	2023[?]	9780639734736		TCC Press
Macbeth	Albanian	Makbethi	Fan Stylian Noli	Pristina	1968		503891951	
Macbeth	Dutch	Macbeth. Treurspel.	Pieter Boddaert	Amsterdam	1800		558130563	Early Dutch Books Online
Macbeth	Dutch	Macbeth : treurspel in vijf bedriven	Leendert Alexander Johannes Burgersdijk	S-'Gravenhague	1882		47793313	HaithiTrust
Macbeth	Estonian	Macbeth	Ants Oras	Tartu	1929		924542477	
The Merchant of Venice	Māori	Te Tangata Whai-rawa o Wēniti	Pei Te Hurinui Jones	Palmerston North	1946		154127770	
The Merchant of Venice	Swahili	Mabepari wa Venisi	Julius K. Nyerere	Nairobi	1981	9780195721706	630305188	
Julius Caesar	Swahili	Juliasi Kaizari	Julius K. Nyerere	Nairobi	1985	9780195721690	475077976	
The Merry Wives of Windsor	Catalan	Les alegres comares de Windsor	Josep Carner		1909			Gutenberg
A Midsummer Night's Dream	Afrikaans	Midsomernagdroom	Eitemal (Professor W. J. du P. Erlank)	Cape Town	1974	9780798104340 0798104341	749902101	Sol Plaatje Archive
A Midsummer Night's Dream	Dutch	Een Midzomernachtdroom	Leendert Alexander Johannes Burgersdijk	Antwerp	1908		746981168	Project Gutenberg
A Midsummer Night's Dream	Dutch	A midsummer night's dream : a comedy in five acts	Willem van Doorn	Groningen	1942		64486686	
A Midsummer Night's Dream	Estonian	Suveöö-Unenägu	Anna Haava	Tallinn	1924		82155974	
A Midsummer Night's Dream	Estonian	Suveöö unenägu	Ants Oras	Tartu	1937		753187071	E-kataloog ESTER With: Sonette; Othello
A Midsummer Night's Dream	French	Le songe d'une nuit d'été	Jean-Louis Supervielle, Jules Supervielle	Paris	1959		13439423 1231955560	
A Midsummer Night's Dream	French	Le songe d'une nuit d'été	Nicolas Briançon	Paris	2011	9782749812014	759590560	
Much Ado About Nothing	Mauritian French Creole	Enn Ta Senn Dan Vid	Dev Virahsawmy	Port Louis	1995	9789990333053	40200789	
Macbeth	Russian	Макбет [Makbet]	Vladimir Gandelsman		2010	9785983791374		With: Hamlet
Othello	Albanian	Tragjedia e Othello's Arapit te Venetikut	Fan Stylian Noli	Pristina	1916		1061925229	LC
Othello	Dutch	Othello, de Moor van Venetië	Jurriaan Moulin	Kampen	1836		47795568	HaithiTrust
Othello	Dutch	Othello	Willy Courteaux	Amsterdam	1960		863301150	
Othello	Estonian	Othello	Ants Oras	Tartu	1937		753187071	E-kataloog ESTER With: Suveöö unenägu; Sonette
Richard III	Afrikaans	Koning Richard III	Deryck Uys	[Johannesburg?]	2022	9780639734712		TCC Press
Richard III	Dutch[?]	Koning Richard III	Abraham Seyne Kok	Amsterdam	1861		752892745	HaithiTrust
Romeo and Juliet	Afrikaans	Romeo en Juliet	Deryck Uys	[Johannesburg?]	2024	9780639734774		TCC Press
Romeo and Juliet	Arabic	روميو وجوليت [Rūmiyū wa-Jūliyit	Muḥammad Muḥammad ʻInānī	Cairo	1986	9789771721444	36655993	
Romeo and Juliet	Dutch	Roméo en Julia, tooneelspel	B. Fremerij	Dordrecht	1786		1395280042	Early Dutch Books Online
Romeo and Juliet	Estonian	Romeo ja Julia	Ants Oras	Tartu	1935		503905700	E-kataloog ESTER
Romeo and Juliet	Haitian Creole	Romeo ak Jilyèt	Nicole Titus	Cambridge	2019	9781936431335	1405851643	
Romeo and Juliet	Tagalog	Ang Sintang Dalisay ni Julieta at Romeo	G. D. Roke	Manila	1901 (published)			Gutenberg
Romeo and Juliet	Welsh	Romeo a Juliet	J. T. Jones	Carmarthen (2005 reprint); Caernarfon (2007 reprint)	1983 (published)		12520327	NLW; NLW
The Taming of the Shrew	Dutch	De Dolle Bruyloft: Bly-eyndend'-Spel	Abraham Sybant	Amsterdam	1654		459165796	MDZ
The Taming of the Shrew	Dutch	De getemde feeks	Leendert Alexander Johannes Burgersdijk	Leiden	1923		68715228	Project Gutenberg
The Taming of the Shrew	Dutch	De feeks wordt getemd	Willy Courteaux	Amsterdam	1956		668412499	
The Tempest	Nepali	Aandhibehari	Suman Pokhrel	Kathmandu	2018	9789937723084		OL
The Tempest	Estonian	Torm	Ants Oras	Tartu	1935		753190521	E-kataloog ESTER
The Tempest	Welsh	Y dymestl	Gwyn Thomas	Denbigh	c. 1996 (published)	9780707402789 0707402786	59583839	NLW
The Tempest	Welsh	Y Storm	Gwyneth Lewis	Bala	2012	9781906396497 1906396493	810425251	
Titus Andronicus	Afrikaans	Titus Andronicus	Breyten Breytenbach	Cape Town	1970		377538676	
Twelfth Night	Afrikaans	Twaalfde nag	Uys Krige	Cape Town	1967	9780798601078 0798601078	105647293	
Twelfth Night	American Sign Language	William Shakespeare's Twelfth Night [Performance; DVD]	The Amaryllis Theater Company	Philadelphia	2006	9781563683541 1563683547	1001832940	See also: ASL Shakespeare
Twelfth Night	Welsh	Nos Ystwyll	J. T. Jones	Aberystwyth	1970	9780901410092 0901410098	16191944	NLW
The Winter's Tale	Afrikaans	Die Wintersprokie	Eitemal (Professor W. J. du P. Erlank)	Cape Town	1975	9780624006268 0624006263	4224776	

== Poems ==
Original Specific Work	Language	Title of Translation	Translator(s)	Place of Publication	Date of Publication	ISBN	WorldCat OCLC	Notes
Sonnets	Dutch	Shakespeare's sonnetten	W. van Elden	S-'Gravenhague	1959		83307694	
Sonnets	Estonian	Sonette	Ants Oras	Tartu	1937		753187071	E-kataloog ESTER With: Suveöö unenägu; Othello
Venus and Adonis	Dutch	Venus & Adonis	Hafid Bouazza	Amsterdam	2019	9789025310202, 9025310206	1090690424	

== See also ==
- List of translators of William Shakespeare
