= Johann Gottlieb Fichte =

German philosopher (1762–1814)

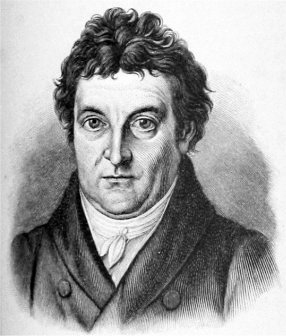
- Born: 19 May 1762; Rammenau, Saxony
- Died: 29 January 1814 (aged 51); Berlin, Prussia
- Spouse: Johanna Maria Rahn (m. 1793)
- Children: I. H. Fichte

Education
- Education: Schulpforta; University of Jena (1780; no degree); Leipzig University (1781–1784; no degree)
- Academic advisor: Ernst Platner

Philosophical work
- Era: 18th-century philosophy
- Region: Western philosophy
- School: German idealism Jena Romanticism; German nationalism
- Institutions: University of Jena; University of Erlangen; University of Berlin
- Notable students: See list: J. F. Fries; J. F. Herbart; Friedrich Hölderlin; Karl Krause
- Main interests: Ethics; Metaphysics; Philosophy of mind; Philosophy of self; Political philosophy
- Notable ideas: See list: Absolutes Bewusstsein (absolute consciousness); Anstoß (impulse); Aufforderung (summons); Facticity; Gegenseitige Anerkennung (mutual recognition); Nicht-Ich (not-I); Philosophical reflection as intellectual intuition (intellectuelle Anschauung); Philosophy as pragmatic history of the human mind; Primacy of the practical; Principle of reciprocal determination; Productive imagination as an original power of the mind; Self-awareness preceding explicit self-reflection (Fichte's original insight); Schöne Kunst (fine art) as access to the transcendental standpoint; Streben (striving); Tathandlung (fact-act); Thesis–antithesis–synthesis; Urtrieb (original drive); Weltanschauung (worldview); Wissenschaftslehre (doctrine of science) as Real-Idealismus/Ideal-Realismus (real-idealism/ideal-realism)

Johann Gottlieb Fichte (Note: /ˈfɪxtə/; German: [ˈjoːhan ˈɡɔtliːp ˈfɪçtə]) (19 May 1762 – 29 January 1814) was a German philosopher, and a founding figure of German idealism, which developed from the theoretical and ethical writings of Immanuel Kant.

Fichte is an important philosopher in his own right due to his original insights into the nature of self-consciousness or self-awareness. Fichte was also the originator of thesis–antithesis–synthesis, an idea that is often erroneously attributed to Hegel.

Like Descartes and Kant before him, Fichte was motivated by the problem of subjectivity and consciousness. Fichte also wrote works of political philosophy; he has a reputation as one of the fathers of German nationalism.

== Biography ==
=== Origins ===
Fichte was born in Rammenau, Upper Lusatia, Saxony, and baptized a Lutheran. The son of a ribbon weaver, Fichte was born into a pious family that had lived in the region for generations. Christian Fichte (1737–1812), Johann Gottlieb's father, married Maria Dorothea Fichte, née Schurich (1739–1813) somewhat above his class. It has been suggested that a certain impatience which Fichte himself displayed throughout his life was an inheritance from his mother.

He received a rudimentary education from his father. He showed remarkable ability from an early age, and it was owing to his reputation among the villagers that he gained the opportunity for a better education than he otherwise would have received. The story runs that the Freiherr Ernst Haubold von Miltitz, a country landowner, arrived too late to hear the local pastor preach. He was, however, informed that a lad in the neighborhood would be able to repeat the sermon almost verbatim. As a result, the baron took Fichte into his protection and paid for his tuition.

=== Early schooling ===
Fichte was placed in the family of pastor Gotthold Leberecht Krebel in Niederau near Meissen, and there received a thorough grounding in the classics. From this time onward, Fichte saw little of his parents. In October 1774, he attended the celebrated foundation school at Pforta near Naumburg. The Pforta school is associated with the names of Johann Elias Schlegel, Johann Adolf Schlegel, Heinrich von Hardenberg, Anton von Hardenberg, and Friedrich Nietzsche. The spirit of the institution was semi-monastic and, while the education was excellent, it is doubtful whether there was enough social life and contact with the world for Fichte. Freiherr von Miltitz had continued to support Fichte financially, but died on 6 March 1774. Following his death, his widow, Baroness Henriette Luise von Miltitz, continued to provide Fichte with financial support from 1774 to 1784, enabling him to complete his pre-university education and subsequently study theology at the universities of Jena and Leipzig. However, growing increasingly dissatisfied with Fichte’s waning interest in becoming a clergyman, she eventually withdrew all financial support sometime in 1784.

=== Theological studies and private tutoring ===
In 1780, Fichte began study at the University of Jena's Lutheran theological seminary. He was transferred a year later to study at the Leipzig University. Fichte seems to have needed to start supporting himself during this period of poverty and struggle. Following Baroness von Miltitz's complete withdrawal of financial support in 1784, Fichte was forced to abandon his university studies abruptly without completing his degree.

Consequently, from 1784 to 1788, he was forced to support himself through precarious employment as a tutor for various Saxon families. In early 1788, he returned to Leipzig in the hope of finding a better form of employment, but eventually he had to settle for a less promising position with the family of an innkeeper in Zürich. He lived in Zürich for the next two years (1788–1790), where he met his future wife, Johanna Maria Rahn (1755–1819), and Johann Heinrich Pestalozzi. He also became, in 1793, a member of the Freemasonry lodge "Modestia cum Libertate", with which Johann Wolfgang Goethe was also connected. In the spring of 1790, he became engaged to Johanna. Fichte began to study the works of Kant in the summer of 1790. This occurred initially because one of Fichte's students wanted to know about Kant's writings. They had a lasting effect on his life and thought. However, while Fichte was studying Kantian philosophy, the Rahn family suffered financial setbacks. His impending marriage to Johanna had to be postponed.

=== Immanuel Kant ===
From Zürich, Fichte returned to Leipzig in May 1790. In early 1791, he obtained a tutorship in Warsaw in the house of a Polish nobleman. The situation, however, quickly proved disagreeable and he was released. He then got a chance to see Kant in Königsberg. After a disappointing interview with Kant on 4 July of the same year, he shut himself in his lodgings and threw all his energies into the composition of an essay which would attract Kant's attention and interest. This essay, completed in five weeks, was the Versuch einer Critik aller Offenbarung (Attempt at a Critique of All Revelation, 1792). In this book, according to Dieter Henrich, Fichte investigated the connections between divine revelation and Kant's critical philosophy. The first edition was published without Kant's or Fichte's knowledge and without Fichte's name or signed preface. It was thus believed by the public to be a new work by Kant.

When Kant cleared the confusion and openly praised the work and author, Fichte's reputation skyrocketed. In a letter to Karl Leonhard Reinhold, Jens Baggesen wrote that it was "...the most shocking and astonishing news... [since] nobody but Kant could have written this book. This amazing news of a third sun in the philosophical heavens has set me into such confusion." Kant waited seven years to make a public statement about the incident; after considerable external pressure he dissociated himself from Fichte. In his statement, he inscribed, "May God protect us from our friends. From our enemies, we can try to protect ourselves."

=== Jena ===
On 22 October 1793, Fichte married Johanna in Baden near Zürich. He remained in Zürich for the rest of the year. Stirred by the events and principles of the French Revolution, he wrote and anonymously published two pamphlets which led to him being seen as a devoted defender of liberty of thought and action, and an advocate of political changes. In December 1793, he received an invitation to fill the position of extraordinary professor of philosophy at the University of Jena. He accepted and began his lectures in May 1794. With extraordinary zeal, he expounded his system of "transcendental idealism". His success was immediate. He excelled as a lecturer due to the earnestness and force of his personality. These lectures were later published under the title The Vocation of the Scholar (Einige Vorlesungen über die Bestimmung des Gelehrten). He gave himself up to intense production, and a succession of works soon appeared.

=== Atheism dispute ===
Fichte was dismissed from the University of Jena in 1799 for atheism. He had been accused of this in 1798 after publishing the essay "Ueber den Grund unsers Glaubens an eine göttliche Weltregierung" ("On the Ground of Our Belief in a Divine World-Governance"), written in response to Friedrich Karl Forberg's essay "Development of the Concept of Religion", in his Philosophical Journal. For Fichte, God should be conceived primarily in moral terms: "The living and efficaciously acting moral order is itself God. We require no other God, nor can we grasp any other" ("On the Ground of Our Belief in a Divine World-Governance"). Fichte's intemperate "Appeal to the Public" ("Appellation an das Publikum", 1799) provoked F. H. Jacobi to publish an open letter in which he equated philosophy in general and Fichte's transcendental philosophy in particular with nihilism.

=== Berlin ===
Since all the German states except Prussia had joined the cry against Fichte, he was forced to go to Berlin. There he associated himself with Friedrich and August Wilhelm Schlegel, Schleiermacher, Schelling, and Tieck. In April 1800, through the introduction of Hungarian writer Ignaz Aurelius Fessler, he was initiated into Freemasonry in the Lodge Pythagoras of the Blazing Star, where he was elected minor warden. At first Fichte was a warm admirer of Fessler, and was disposed to aid him in his proposed Masonic reform. But later he became Fessler's bitter opponent. Their controversy attracted much attention among Freemasons. Fichte presented two lectures on the philosophy of Masonry during the same period as part of his work on the development of various higher degrees for the lodge in Berlin. Johann Karl Christian Fischer, a high official of the Grand Orient, published those lectures in 1802/03 in two volumes under the title Philosophy of Freemasonry: Letters to Konstant (Philosophie der Maurerei. Briefe an Konstant), where "Konstant" referred to a fictitious non-Mason.

In 1800, Fichte published The Closed Commercial State: A Philosophical Sketch as an Appendix to the Doctrine of Right and an Example of a Future Politics (Der geschlossene Handelsstaat. Ein philosophischer Entwurf als Anhang zur Rechtslehre und Probe einer künftig zu liefernden Politik), a philosophical statement of his property theory, a historical analysis of European economic relations, and a political proposal for reforming them. In 1805, he was appointed to a professorship at the University of Erlangen. The Battle of Jena-Auerstedt in 1806, in which Napoleon defeated the Prussian army, drove him to Königsberg for a time, but he returned to Berlin in 1807 and continued his literary activity.

Fichte published the essay "On Machiavelli, as an Author, and Passages from His Writings" ("Ueber Machiavell, als Schriftsteller, und Stellen aus seinen Schriften") in June 1807. On 11 January 1809, Carl von Clausewitz wrote an anonymous letter to Fichte in response to his essay on Niccolò Machiavelli.

After the collapse of the Holy Roman Empire, when German southern principalities resigned as member states and became part of a French protectorship, Fichte delivered the famous Addresses to the German Nation (Reden an die deutsche Nation, 1807-1808), which attempted to define the German Nation and guided the uprising against Napoleon. He became a professor at the new University of Berlin, founded in 1810. By the votes of his colleagues Fichte was unanimously elected its rector in the succeeding year. But, once more, his temperament led to friction, and he resigned in 1812. The campaign against Napoleon began, and the hospitals at Berlin were soon full of patients. Fichte's wife devoted herself to nursing and caught a virulent fever. Just as she was recovering, he became sick with typhus and died in 1814 at the age of 51.

His son, Immanuel Hermann Fichte (1796–1879), also made contributions to philosophy.

== Philosophical work ==
Fichte's critics argued that his mimicry of Kant's difficult style produced works that were barely intelligible. On the other hand, Fichte acknowledged the difficulty, but argued that his works were clear and transparent to those who made the effort to think without preconceptions and prejudices.

Fichte did not endorse Kant's argument for the existence of "things in themselves", the supra-sensible reality beyond direct human perception. Fichte saw the rigorous and systematic separation of "things in themselves" and things "as they appear to us" (phenomena) as an invitation to skepticism. Rather than invite skepticism, Fichte made the radical suggestion that we should throw out the notion of a world-in-itself and accept that consciousness does not have a grounding. In fact, Fichte achieved fame for originating the argument that consciousness is not grounded in anything outside of itself. The phenomenal world as such, arises from consciousness, the activity of the I, and moral awareness.

=== Central theory ===
In Foundations of Natural Right (1797), Fichte argued that self-consciousness is a social phenomenon. For Fichte, a necessary condition of every subject's self-awareness is the existence of other rational subjects. These others call or summon (fordern auf) the subject or self out of its unconsciousness and into an awareness of itself as a free individual.

Fichte proceeds from the general principle that the I (das Ich) must posit itself as an individual in order to posit (setzen) itself at all, and that in order to posit itself as an individual, it must recognize itself to a calling or summons (Aufforderung) by other free individual(s) — called to limit its own freedom out of respect for the freedom of the others. The same condition applies to the others in development. Mutual recognition (gegenseitige Anerkennung) of rational individuals is a condition necessary for the individual I. The argument for intersubjectivity is central to the conception of selfhood developed in the Foundations of the Science of Knowledge (Grundlage der gesammten Wissenschaftslehre, 1794/1795).

According to Fichte, consciousness of the self depends upon resistance or a check by something that is not self, yet is not immediately ascribable to a particular sensory perception. In his later 1796–99 lectures (his Nova methodo), Fichte incorporated this into his revised presentation of the foundations of his system, where the summons takes its place alongside original feeling, which takes the place of the earlier Anstoss (see below) as a limit on the absolute freedom and a condition for the positing of the I.

The I posits this situation for itself. To posit does not mean to 'create' the objects of consciousness. The principle in question simply states that the essence of an I lies in the assertion of self-identity; that is, consciousness presupposes self-consciousness. Such immediate self-identity cannot be understood as a psychological fact, or an act or accident of some previously existing substance or being. It is an action of the I, but one that is identical with the very existence of this same I. In Fichte's technical terminology, the original unity of self-consciousness is an action and the product of the same I, as a "fact and/or act" (Thathandlung; Modern German: Tathandlung), a unity that is presupposed by and contained within every fact and every act of empirical consciousness, although it never appears as such.

The I can posit itself only as limited. It cannot even posit its own limitations, in the sense of producing or creating these limits. The finite I cannot be the ground of its own passivity. Instead, for Fichte, if the I is to posit itself, it must simply discover itself to be limited, a discovery that Fichte characterizes as an "impulse," "repulse," or "resistance" (Anstoss; Modern German: Anstoß) to the free practical activity of the I. Such an original limitation of the I is, however, a limit for the I only insofar as the I posits it as a limit. The I does this, according to Fichte's analysis, by positing its own limitation, first, as only a feeling, then as a sensation, next as an intuition of a thing, and finally as a summons of another person.

The Anstoss thus provides the essential impetus that first posits in motion the entire complex train of activities that finally result in our conscious experience both of ourselves and others as empirical individuals and of the world around us. Although Anstoss plays a similar role as the thing in itself does in Kantian philosophy, unlike Kant, Fichte's Anstoss is not something foreign to the I. Instead, it denotes the original encounter of the I with its own finitude. Rather than claim that the not-I (das Nicht-Ich) is the cause or ground of the Anstoss, Fichte argues that not-I is posited by the I in order to explain to itself the Anstoss in order to become conscious of Anstoss. The Wissenschaftslehre demonstrates that Anstoss must occur if self-consciousness is to come about but is unable to explain the actual occurrence of Anstoss. There are limits to what can be expected from an a priori deduction of experience, and this, for Fichte, equally applies to Kant's transcendental philosophy. According to Fichte, transcendental philosophy can explain that the world must have space, time, and causality, but it can never explain why objects have the particular sensible properties they happen to have or why I am this determinate individual rather than another. This is something that the I simply has to discover at the same time that it discovers its own freedom, and indeed, is a condition for the latter.

Dieter Henrich (1966) proposed that Fichte was able to move beyond a "reflective theory of consciousness". According to Fichte, the self must already have some prior acquaintance with itself, independent of the act of reflection ("no object comes to consciousness except under the condition that I am aware of myself, the conscious subject"). This idea is what Henrich called Fichte's original insight.

=== Views on women ===
Fichte has been criticized by modern scholars for his views on women. Christopher Clark, in his book Iron Kingdom: The Rise and Downfall of Prussia, 1600-1947, makes the following claim: "The patriot philosopher Fichte had been arguing since the late 1790s that active citizenship, civic freedom and even property rights should be withheld from women, whose calling was to subject themselves utterly to the authority of their fathers and husbands." Clark here does not quote Fichte directly or in paraphrase and provides no primary or secondary sources for his claim. Additionally, Marion Heinz criticizes Fichte's view in her chapter "Love and Recognition in Fichte and the Alternative Position of de Beauvoir", published in the 2013 anthology The Impact of Idealism: The Legacy of Post-Kantian German Thought. She argues, "If the measures developed to defend the value and dignity of woman require their sexual, legal and political subjection, then we are dealing with sheer hypocrisy, for the fundamental postulate of equality has been violated both in the exposition of the problem and in the proposed solution."

Fichte states that women cannot hold public office. He gives two possible reasons. First, she would not be fully subjugating herself to her husband, which "is contrary to her female dignity." Second, she is sufficiently devoted to her husband, in essence, making him the public official instead of her.

=== Nationalism ===
Between December 1807 and March 1808, Fichte gave a series of lectures concerning the "German nation" and its culture and language, projecting the kind of national education he hoped would raise it from the humiliation of its defeat at the hands of the French. Having been a supporter of Revolutionary France, Fichte became disenchanted by 1804 as Napoleon's armies advanced through Europe, occupying German territories, stripping them of their raw materials and subjugating them to foreign rule. He came to believe Germany would be responsible for carrying the virtues of the French Revolution into the future. Disappointed in the French, he turned to the German nation as the instrument of fulfilling it.

These lectures, entitled the Addresses to the German Nation, coincided with a period of reform in the Prussian government under the chancellorship of Baron vom Stein. The Addresses display Fichte's interest during that period in language and culture as vehicles of human spiritual development. Fichte built upon earlier ideas of Johann Gottfried Herder and attempted to unite them with his approach. The aim of the German nation, according to Fichte, was to "found an empire of spirit and reason, and to annihilate completely the crude physical force that rules of the world." Like Herder's German nationalism, Fichte's was cultural, and grounded in aesthetic, literary, and moral principles.

The nationalism propounded by Fichte in the Addresses would be used over a century later by the Nazi Party in Germany, which saw in Fichte a forerunner to its own nationalist ideology. As with Nietzsche, the association of Fichte with the Nazi regime came to color readings of Fichte in the post-war period. This reading of Fichte was often bolstered through reference to an unpublished letter from 1793, Contributions to the Correction of the Public's Judgment concerning the French Revolution, in which Fichte expressed anti-Semitic sentiments, such as arguing against extending civil rights to Jews and calling them a "state within a state" that could "undermine" the German nation.

However, attached to the letter is a footnote in which Fichte provides an impassioned plea for permitting Jews to practice their religion without hindrance. Furthermore, the final act of Fichte's academic career was to resign as rector of the University of Berlin in protest when his colleagues refused to punish the harassment of Jewish students. While recent scholarship has sought to dissociate Fichte's writings on nationalism with their adoption by the Nazi Party, the association continues to blight his legacy, although Fichte, as if to exclude all ground of doubt, clearly and distinctly prohibits, in his reworked version of The Science of Ethics as Based on the Science of Knowledge (see § Final period in Berlin) genocide and other crimes against humanity:

If you say that it is your conscience's command to exterminate peoples for their sins, [...] we can confidently tell you that you are wrong; for such things can never be commanded against the free and moral force.

=== Economics ===
Fichte's 1800 economic treatise The Closed Commercial State had a profound influence on the economic theories of German Romanticism. In it, Fichte argues the need for the strictest, purely guild-like regulation of industry.

The "exemplary rational state" (Vernunftstaat), Fichte argues, should not allow any of its "subjects" to engage in this or that production, failing to pass the preliminary test, not certifying government agents in their professional skills and agility. According to Vladimir Mikhailovich Shulyatikov, "this kind of demand was typical of Mittelstund, the German petty middle class, the class of artisans, hoping by creating artificial barriers to stop the victorious march of big capital and thus save themselves from inevitable death. The same demand was imposed on the state, as is evident from Fichte's treatise, by the German "factory" (Fabrike), more precisely, the manufacture of the early 19th century".

Fichte opposed free trade and unrestrained capitalist industrial growth, stating: "There is an endless war of all against all ... And this war is becoming more fierce, unjust, more dangerous in its consequences, the more the world's population grows, the more acquisitions the trading state makes, the more production and art (industry) develops and, together with thus, the number of circulating goods increases, and with them the needs become more and more diversified."

The only means that could save the modern world, which would destroy evil at the root, is, according to Fichte, to split the "world state" (the global market) into separate self-sufficient bodies. Each such body, each "closed trading state" will be able to regulate its internal economic relations. It will be able to both extract and process everything that is needed to meet the needs of its citizens. It will carry out the ideal organization of production. Fichte argued for government regulation of industrial growth, writing "Only by limitation does a certain industry become the property of the class that deals with it".

== Final period in Berlin ==
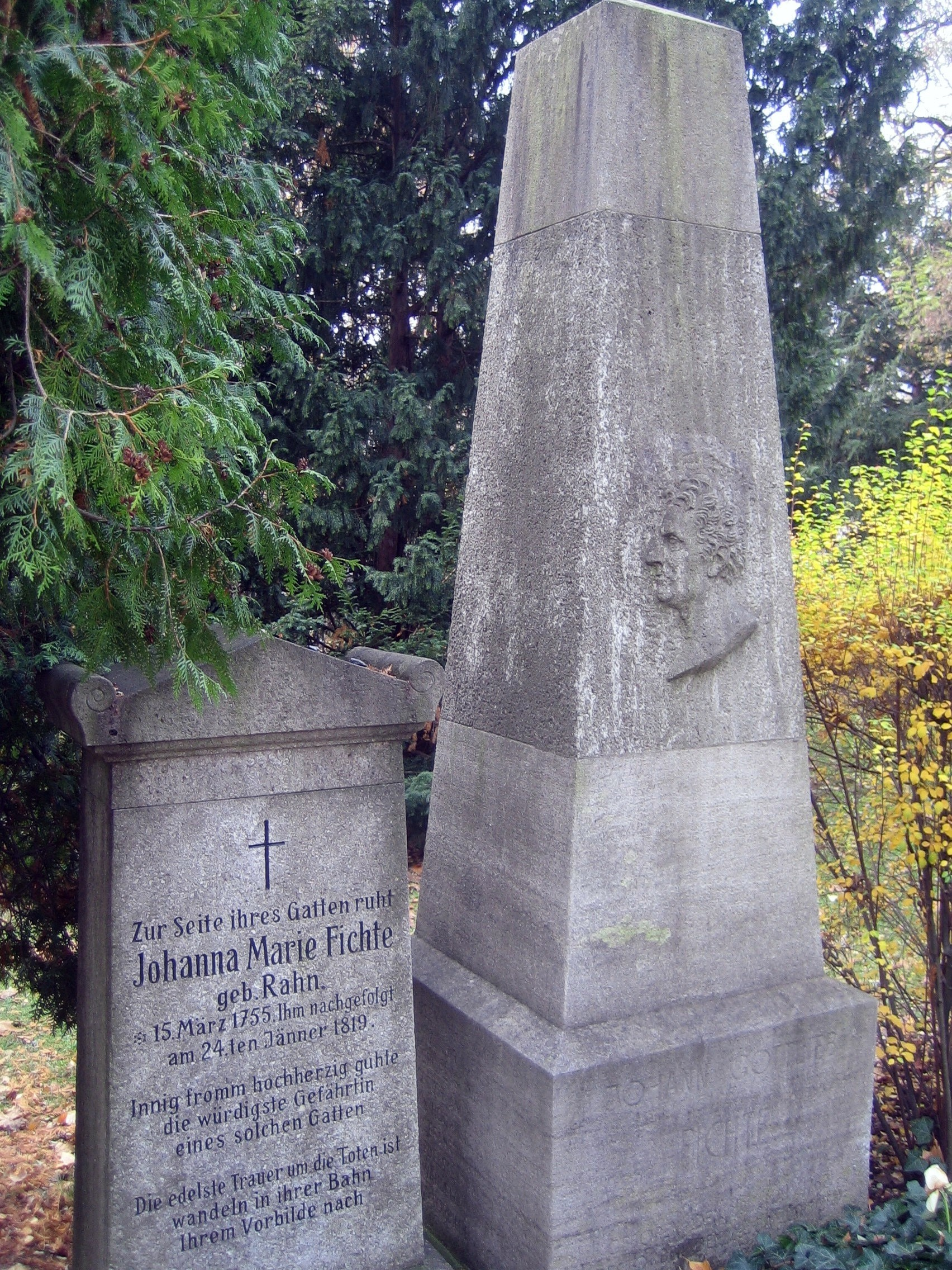
Tombs of Johann Gottlieb Fichte and his wife Johanna Marie, Dorotheenstaedtischer Friedhof (cemetery), Berlin

Fichte gave a wide range of public and private lectures in Berlin in the last decade of his life. These form some of his best-known work and are the basis of a revived German-speaking scholarly interest in his work.

The lectures include two works from 1806. In The Characteristics of the Present Age (Die Grundzüge des gegenwärtigen Zeitalters), Fichte outlines his theory of different historical and cultural epochs. His mystical work The Way Towards the Blessed Life (Die Anweisung zum seligen Leben oder auch die Religionslehre) gave his fullest thoughts on religion. In 1807–08, he gave a series of speeches in French-occupied Berlin, Addresses to the German Nation.

In 1810, the new University of Berlin was established, designed along ideas put forward by Wilhelm von Humboldt. Fichte was made its rector and also the first Chair of Philosophy. This was in part because of educational themes in the Addresses, and in part because of his earlier work at Jena University.

Fichte lectured on further versions of his Wissenschaftslehre. Of these, he only published a brief work from 1810, The Science of Knowledge in its General Outline (Die Wissenschaftslehre, in ihrem allgemeinen Umrisse dargestellt; also translated as Outline of the Doctrine of Knowledge). His son published some of these thirty years after his death. Most only became public in the last decades of the twentieth century, in his collected works. This included reworked versions of the Doctrine of Science (Wissenschaftslehre, 1810–1813), The Science of Rights (Das System der Rechtslehre, 1812), and The Science of Ethics as Based on the Science of Knowledge (Das System der Sittenlehre nach den Principien der Wissenschaftslehre, 1812; 1st ed. 1798).

== Bibliography ==
=== Selected works in German ===
==== Wissenschaftslehre ====
- Ueber den Begriff der Wissenschaftslehre oder der sogenannten Philosophie (1794)
- Grundlage der gesammten Wissenschaftslehre (1794/1795)
- Wissenschaftslehre nova methodo (1796–1799: "Halle Nachschrift," 1796/1797 and "Krause Nachschrift," 1798/1799)
- Versuch einer neuen Darstellung der Wissenschaftslehre (1797/1798)
- Darstellung der Wissenschaftslehre (1801)
- Die Wissenschaftslehre (1804, 1812, 1813)
- Die Wissenschaftslehre, in ihrem allgemeinen Umrisse dargestellt (1810)

==== Other works in German ====
- Versuch einer Critik aller Offenbarung (1792)
- Beitrag zur Berichtigung der Urteile des Publikums über die französische Revolution (1793)
- Einige Vorlesungen über die Bestimmung des Gelehrten (1794)
- Grundlage des Naturrechts (1796)
- Das System der Sittenlehre nach den Principien der Wissenschaftslehre (1798)
- "Ueberden Grund unsers Glaubens an eine göttliche Weltregierung" (1798)
- "Appellation an das Publikum über die durch Churf. Sächs. Confiscationsrescript ihm beigemessenen atheistischen Aeußerungen. Eine Schrift, die man zu lesen bittet, ehe man sie confsicirt" (1799)
- Der geschlossene Handelsstaat. Ein philosophischer Entwurf als Anhang zur Rechtslehre und Probe einer künftig zu liefernden Politik (1800)
- Die Bestimmung des Menschen (1800)
- Friedrich Nicolais Leben und sonderbare Meinungen (1801)
- Philosophie der Maurerei. Briefe an Konstant (1802/03)
- Die Grundzüge des gegenwärtigen Zeitalters (1806)
- Die Anweisung zum seligen Leben oder auch die Religionslehre (1806)
- Reden an die deutsche Nation (1807/1808)
- Das System der Rechtslehre (1812)

==== Correspondence ====
- Jacobi an Fichte, German Text (1799/1816), with Introduction and Critical Apparatus by Marco Ivaldo and Ariberto Acerbi (Introduction, German Text, Italian Translation, 3 Appendices with Jacobi's and Fichte's complementary Texts, Philological Notes, Commentary, Bibliography, Index): Istituto Italiano per gli Studi Filosofici Press, Naples 2011, ISBN 978-88-905957-5-2.

=== Collected works in German ===
The new standard edition of Fichte's works in German, which supersedes all previous editions, is the Gesamtausgabe ("Collected Works" or "Complete Edition", commonly abbreviated as GA), prepared by the Bavarian Academy of Sciences: Gesamtausgabe der Bayerischen Akademie der Wissenschaften, 42 volumes, edited by Reinhard Lauth, Hans Gliwitzky, Erich Fuchs and Peter Schneider, Stuttgart-Bad Cannstatt: Frommann-Holzboog, 1962–2012.

It is organized into four parts:

- Part I: Published Works
- Part II: Unpublished Writings
- Part III: Correspondence
- Part IV: Lecture Transcripts

Fichte's works are quoted and cited from GA, followed by a combination of Roman and Arabic numbers, indicating the series and volume, respectively, and the page number(s). Another edition is Johann Gottlieb Fichtes sämmtliche Werke (abbrev. SW), ed. I. H. Fichte. Berlin: de Gruyter, 1971.

=== Selected works in English ===
- Concerning the Conception of the Science of Knowledge Generally (Ueber den Begriff der Wissenschaftslehre oder der sogenannten Philosophie, 1794), translated by Adolph Ernst Kroeger. In The Science of Knowledge, pp. 331–336. Philadelphia: J.B. Lippincott & Co., 1868. Rpt., London: Trübner & Co., 1889.
- Attempt at a Critique of All Revelation. Trans. Garrett Green. New York: Cambridge University Press, 1978. (Translation of Versuch einer Critik aller Offenbarung, 1st ed. 1792, 2nd ed. 1793.)
- Early Philosophical Writings. Trans. and ed. Daniel Breazeale. Ithaca: Cornell University Press, 1988. (Contains Selections from Fichte's Writings and Correspondence from the Jena period, 1794–1799).
- Foundations of the Entire Science of Knowledge. Translation of: Grundlage der gesammten Wissenschaftslehre (1794/95, 2nd ed. 1802), Fichte's first major exposition of the Wissenschaftlehre. In: Heath, Peter; Lachs, John, eds. (1982). The Science of Knowledge. With the First and Second Introductions (reissued; first published by Meredith Corporation 1970). Texts in German Philosophy. Translated by Heath, Peter; Lachs, John. Cambridge University Press. ISBN 978-0-521-27050-2.
- Foundations of Natural Right. Trans. Michael Baur. Ed. Frederick Neuhouser. Cambridge: Cambridge University Press, 2000. (Translation of Grundlage des Naturrechts, 1796/97.)
- Foundations of Transcendental Philosophy (Wissenschaftslehre) Nova Methodo [FTP]. Trans. and ed. Daniel Breazeale. Ithaca, NY: Cornell University Press, 1992. (Translation of Wissenschaftslehre nova methodo, 1796–1799.)
- The System of Ethics according to the Principles of the Wissenschaftslehre (translation of Das System der Sittenlehre nach den Principien der Wissenschaftslehre, 1798). Ed. and trans. Daniel Breazeale and Günter Zöller. Cambridge University Press, 2005.
- Introductions to the Wissenschaftslehre and Other Writings. Trans. and ed. Daniel Breazeale. Indianapolis, and Cambridge: Hackett, 1994. (Contains mostly writings from the late Jena period, 1797–1799.)
- The Vocation of Man, 1848. Trans. Peter Preuss. Indianapolis. (Translation of Die Bestimmung des Menschen, 1800.)
- The Vocation of the Scholar, 1847. (Translation of Einige Vorlesungen über die Bestimmung des Gelehrten, 1794.)
- The Closed Commercial State: J G Fichte (with an interpretive essay by the translator, and with a German-English glossary). SUNY series in Contemporary Continental Philosophy. Translated by Adler, Anthony Curtis. Albany, New York: State University of New York Press. 2013. ISBN 978-1-4384-4021-7.
- A Crystal Clear Report to the General Public Concerning the Actual Essence of the Newest Philosophy: An Attempt to Force the Reader to Understand. Trans. John Botterman and William Rash. In: Philosophy of German Idealism, pp. 39–115. (Translation of Sonnenklarer Bericht an das grössere Publikum über das Wesen der neuesten Philosophie, 1801.)
- The Science of Knowing: J.G. Fichte's 1804 Lectures on the Wissenschaftslehre (with an introduction by the translator and a German-English glossary). SUNY series in Contemporary Continental Philosophy. Translated by Wright, Walter E. Albany, New York: State University of New York Press. 2005. ISBN 978-0-7914-6449-6.
- Outline of the Doctrine of Knowledge, 1810 (Translation of Die Wissenschaftslehre, in ihrem allgemeinen Umrisse dargestellt published in From The Popular Works of Johann Gottlieb Fichte, Trubner and Co., 1889; trans. William Smith.)
- On the Nature of the Scholar, 1845 (Translation of Ueber das Wesen des Gelehrten, 1806.)
- Characteristics of the Present Age (Die Grundzüge des gegenwärtigen Zeitalters, 1806). In: The Popular Works of Johann Gottlieb Fichte, 2 vols., trans. and ed. William Smith. London: Chapman, 1848/49. Reprint, London: Thoemmes Press, 1999.
- Addresses to the German Nation (Reden an die deutsche Nation, 1808), ed. and trans. Gregory Moore. Cambridge University Press, 2008.
- The Philosophical Rupture Between Fichte and Schelling: Selected Texts and Correspondence (1800–1802). Trans. and eds. Michael G. Vater and David W. Wood. Albany, NY: State University of New York Press, 2012. Includes the following texts by Johann Gottlieb Fichte: Correspondence with F.W.J. Schelling (1800–1802); "Announcement" (1800); extract from "New Version of the Wissenschaftslehre" (1800); "Commentaries on Schelling's System of Transcendental Idealism and Presentation of My System of Philosophy" (1800–1801).

=== Works online in English ===
- J.G. Fichte. "The Wissenschaftslehre is Mathematics" ("Announcement", 1800/1801)
- Addresses to the German Nation (1922). (Trs. R. F. Jones and G. H. Turnbull.)
- The Destination of Man (1846). Alternative translation of The Vocation of Man]. (Tr. Mrs. Percy Sinnett.)
- Doctrine de la science (Paris, 1843). French translation of Foundations of the Entire Science of Knowledge.
- Johann Gottlieb Fichte's Popular Works (1873). (Tr. William Smith.)
- New Exposition of the Science of Knowledge (1869). Translation of Versuch einer neuen Darstellung der Wissenschaftslehre. (Tr. A. E. Kroeger.)
- On the Nature of the Scholar (1845). Alternative translation of The Vocation of the Scholar. (Tr. William Smith.)
- The Popular Works of Johann Gottlieb Fichte (1848–49). (Tr. William Smith.)
  - Volume 1, 1848. Google (Oxford) IA (UToronto) 4th ed., 1889. IA (UIllinois) IA (UToronto)
  - Volume 2, 1849. IA (UToronto) 4th ed., 1889. Google (Stanford) IA (UIllinois) IA (UToronto)
- The Science of Ethics as Based on the Science of Knowledge (1897). (Tr. A. E. Kroeger.) Google (UMich) IA (UToronto)
- The Science of Knowledge (1889). Alternative translation of Foundations of the Entire Science of Knowledge. (Tr. A. E. Kroeger.) IA (UToronto)
- The Science of Rights (1889). (Tr. A. E. Kroeger.) IA (UCal)
- (German) Versuch einer Critik aller Offenbarung (Königsberg, 1792; 2nd ed. 1793). Gallica Google (Oxford) Google (Oxford)
- The Vocation of Man (1848). (Tr. William Smith.) Google (Oxford) 1910. Google (UCal)
- The Vocation of the Scholar (1847). (Tr. William Smith.) IA (UCal)
- The Way Towards the Blessed Life (1849). (Tr. William Smith.) Google (Oxford)
- "On the Foundation of Our Belief in a Divine Government of the Universe"; alternative translation of "On the Ground of Our Belief in a Divine World-Governance" (anon. trans.; n.d.).

== Sources ==
- Daniel Breazeale. "Fichte's Aenesidemus Review and the Transformation of German Idealism" The Review of Metaphysics, 34 (1980–81): 545–68.
- Daniel Breazeale and Tom Rockmore (eds.). Fichte: Historical Contexts/Contemporary Controversies. Atlantic Highlands: Humanities Press, 1994.
- Daniel Breazeale and Tom Rockmore (eds.), Fichte, German Idealism, and Early Romanticism, Rodopi, 2010.
- Daniel Breazeale. Thinking Through the Wissenschaftslehre: Themes from Fichte's Early Philosophy. Oxford: Oxford University Press, 2013.
- Ezequiel L. Posesorski. Between Reinhold and Fichte: August Ludwig Hülsen's Contribution to the Emergence of German Idealism. Karlsruhe: Karlsruher Institut für Technologie, 2012.
- Sally Sedgwick. The Reception of Kant's Critical Philosophy: Fichte, Schelling, and Hegel. Cambridge: Cambridge University Press, 2007.
- Violetta L. Waibel, Daniel Breazeale, Tom Rockmore (eds.), Fichte and the Phenomenological Tradition, Berlin: Walter de Gruyter, 2010.
- Günter Zöller. Fichte's Transcendental Philosophy: The Original Duplicity of Intelligence and Will. Cambridge: Cambridge University Press, 1998.
