= Veit Hanns Schnorr von Carolsfeld =

German portraitist

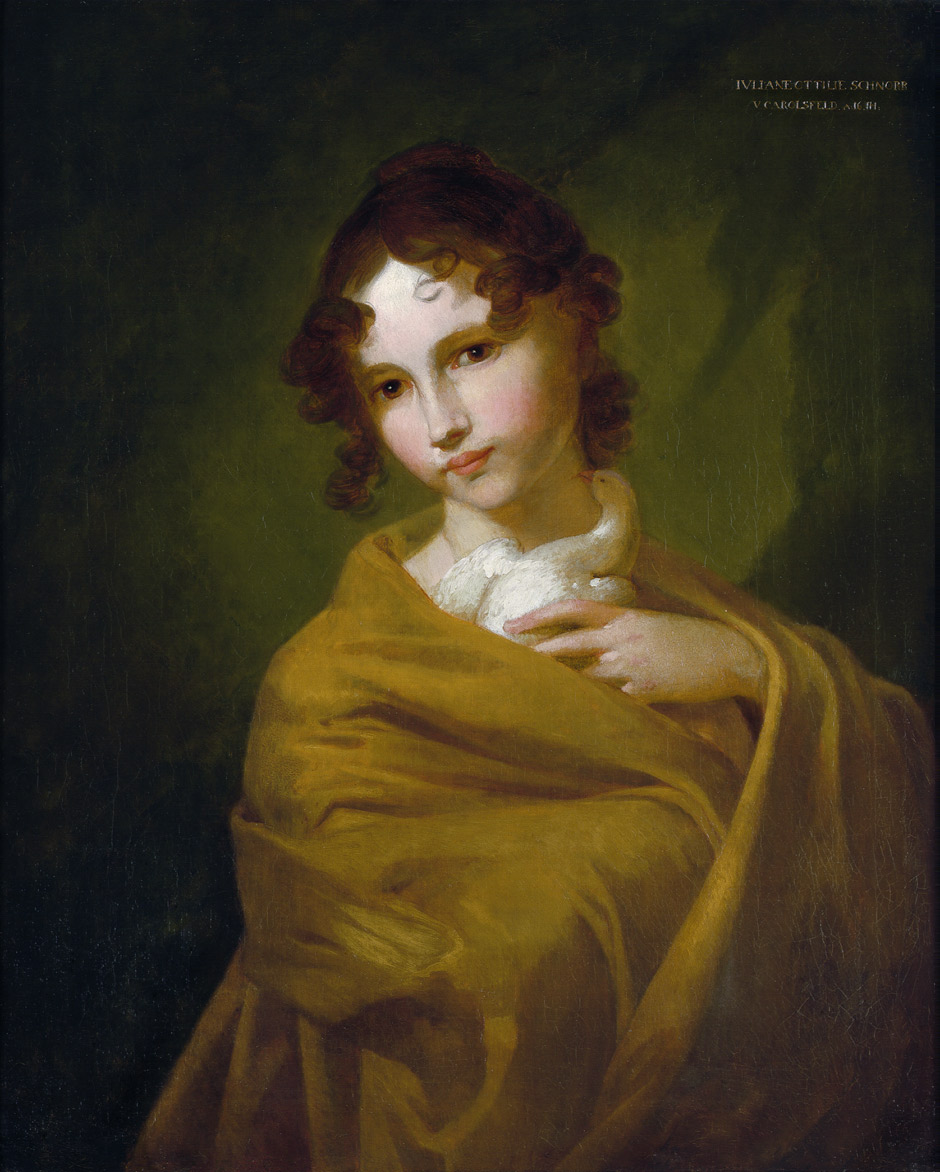
Portrait of the artist's daughter, Juliane Ottilie, c1808

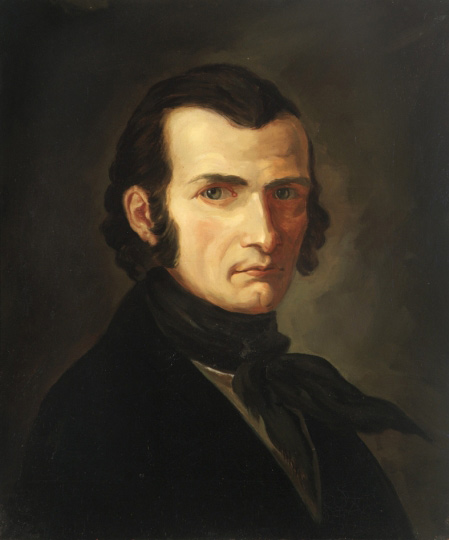
Portrait of the poet Seume

Veit Hanns Friedrich Schnorr von Carolsfeld (11 May 1764 – 30 April 1841) was a German portraitist.

== Life ==
Schnorr was born in Schneeberg, to Councillor and excise inspector in Schneeberg Johann Gottlob Schnorr von Carolsfeld (1713–1788) and his wife Charlotte Sophia Schnorr von Carolsfeld, nee Laurentius (1720–1798), he was he was the eighth of 16 children. His paternal great-grandfather was iron and cobalt magnate Veit Hans Schnorr von Carolsfeld (1644–1715). He was a friend of the poet Johann Gottfried Seume, whom he set out to accompany in 1801 on a journey to Syracuse, Sicily, but separated from him after travelling no further than Vienna.

In 1803 he returned to Leipzig and became an assistant teacher at the Leipzig Academy of Art. In 1814, after the death of Johann Friedrich August Tischbein, he became director, which he remained until 1841.

Schnorr was a significant portraitist. His works include, among many others, portraits of Seume and Friedrich Rochlitz.

== Family ==
Veit Hanns Schnorr von Carolsfeld was twice married. His first wife was Juliane Christiane Lange (1766–1815). After his first wife in 1797 he remarried Eleonore Wilhelmine Irmisch (1773–1851), daughter of Classical philologist and school principal in Plauen (Vogtland) Gottlieb Wilhelm Irmisch (1732–1794) and his wife Friederike Henriette Eleonore Schlegel (1748–1825), daughter of Johann Lebrecht Schlegel (1717–1754) and niece of poet and clergyman Johann Adolf Schlegel (1721–1793), who was a father of brothers August Wilhelm Schlegel (1767–1845) and Friedrich Schlegel (1772–1829).

Two of his sons also became prominent painters:

- Julius Schnorr von Carolsfeld and
- Ludwig Ferdinand Schnorr von Carolsfeld

At Veit Hanns Schnorr von Carolsfeld was also daughter of second marriage:

- Charlotte Schnorr von Carolsfeld (1806–1877), in 1833 got married lawyer August Otto Krug (1805–1867)

== Works ==
- Briefe über Zeichenkunst und Malerei, in: Zweites Toilettengeschenk für Damen, Leipzig 1806
- Unterricht in der Zeichenkunst als ein Gegenstand der seineren Erziehung zur Bildung des Geschmacks für die höheren Stände, Leipzig 1810
- Anmerkungen und Zusätze zur 3. Auflage des Spazierganges nach Syrakus (in the third part of Seume's book, published in 1811)
- Meine Lebensgeschichte, zugleich als ein Sonst und Jetzt in einem Zeitraum von 55 Jahren, ed. Otto Werner Förster, Leipzig: Taurus Verlag, 2000

== Literature ==
- Franz Schnorr von Carolsfeld (1891). "Schnorr von Carolsfeld, Veit Hans Friedrich" . Allgemeine Deutsche Biographie (in German). Vol. 32. Leipzig: Duncker & Humblot. pp. 191–193.
