= August Ferdinand Bernhardi =

German linguist and writer (1769-1820)

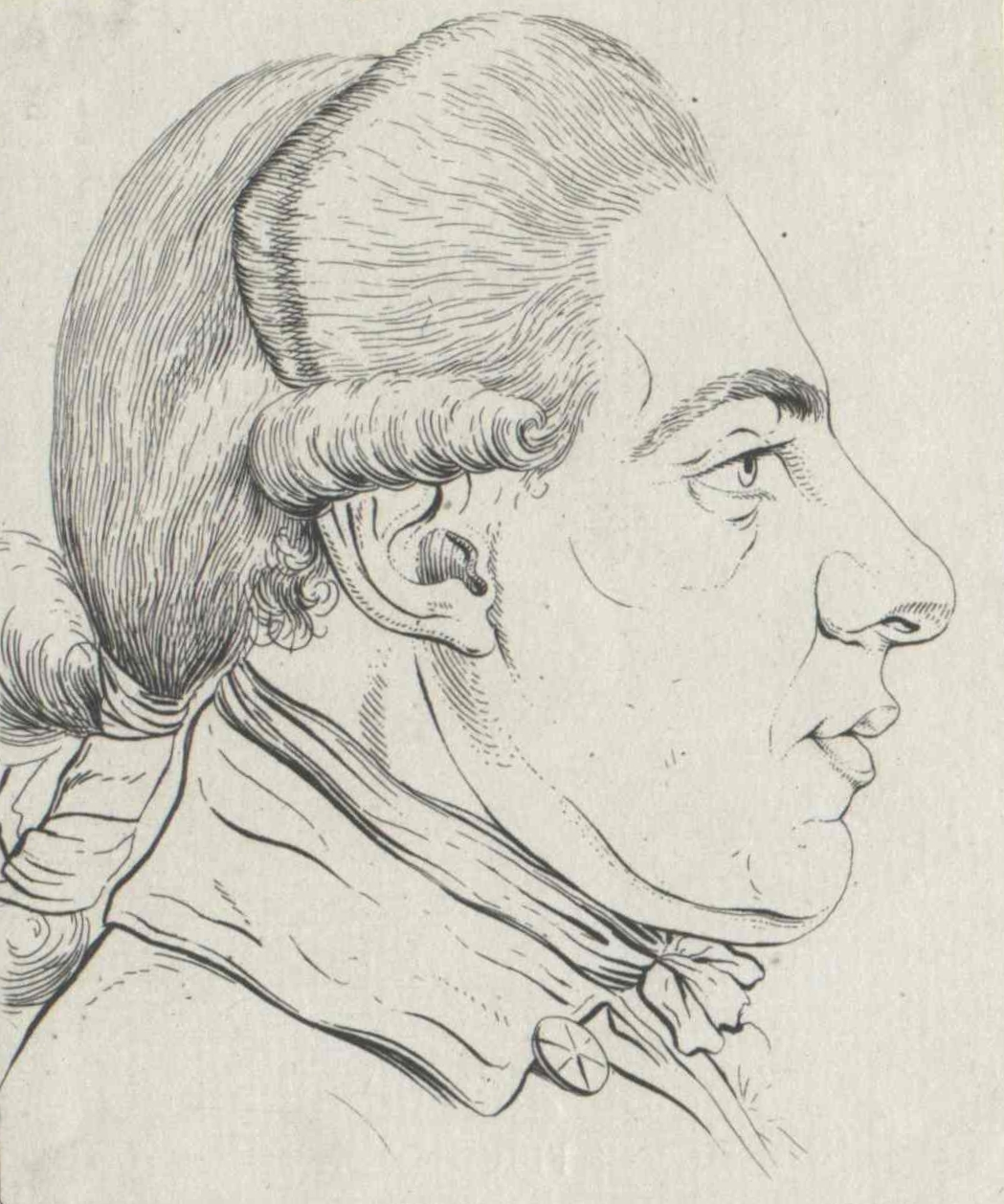
Photo of August Ferdinand Bernhardi

August Ferdinand Bernhardi (24 June 1769 in Berlin – 1 June 1820 in Berlin) was a German linguist and writer.

After studying philosophy in Halle an der Saale, in 1791 Bernhardi became a teacher at the Friedrichwerderschen Gymnasium in Berlin and in 1808 became the institution's headmaster. In 1815 he joined the Marcher Consistory and the Academic Examination Committee. Shortly before his death he was named the headmaster of the Friedrich Wilhelms Gymnasium.

In 1799 Bernhardi married Sophie Tieck, the younger sister of Ludwig Tieck, however, the marriage broke down in 1805. This relationship brought him into Romantic circles, associated with people such as Friedrich and August Wilhelm Schlegel, Ludwig Tieck and others. This prompted him to write and publish works on linguistics, as well as satirical writings about Berlin society and literary life. Bernhardi also contributed to literary journals and almanacs (such as Athenäum and Europa), and wrote some stories and poems in the romantic style, the most well-known of which is Der Löwe in Florenz (The Lion in Florence).

Bernhardi, however, achieved renown and recognition first and foremost through his linguistic research and had significant influence on famous linguists such as Wilhelm von Humboldt and Franz Bopp.

He was the father of the historian Theodor von Bernhardi and grandfather of the Prussian general Friedrich von Bernhardi.

== Works ==
- Vollständige lateinische Grammatik (Complete Latin Grammar) 1795-1797
- Vollständige griechische Grammatik (Complete Greek Grammar) 1797
- Bambocciaden (Bambocciatas) 1797-1800
- Sprachlehre (Grammar) 1801-1803
- Anfangsgründe der Sprachwissenschaft (Fundamentals of Linguistics) 1805
- Die Versuche und Hindernisse Karls (The Trials and Tribulations of Karl) 1808
- Ansichten über die Organisation der gelehrten Schulen (Observations on the Organisation of Academic Schools) 1818

== Literature ==
- Bräuer, Joachim (1921): August Friedrich Bernhardi, der Sprachphilosoph der älteren Romantik (August Friedrich Bernhardi, the Linguistic Thinker of the Early Romantics)
- Blücher, Max (1923): A. F. Bernhardis Leben und Schriften (A. F. Bernhardi's Life and Works)
- Horstmann, Wilhelm (1926): August Ferdinand Bernhardi 1769–1820 als Pädagoge (August Ferdinand Bernhardi 1769-1820 as a Pedagogue)
- Fiesel, Eva (1927): Die Sprachphilosophie der deutschen Romantik (The Linguistics Thoughts of the German Romantics)
- Wild-Schedlbauer, Roswitha (1990): Einleitung zu A. F. Bernhardi (Introduction to A. F. Bernhardi) ISBN 3-7728-0786-0
- Hurch, Bernhard (2000): Bernhardi und Humboldt und die Asymmetrie der Prosodie (Bernhardi and Humboldt and the Asymmetry of Prosody)
