= Sophie Tieck =

German writer (1775–1833)

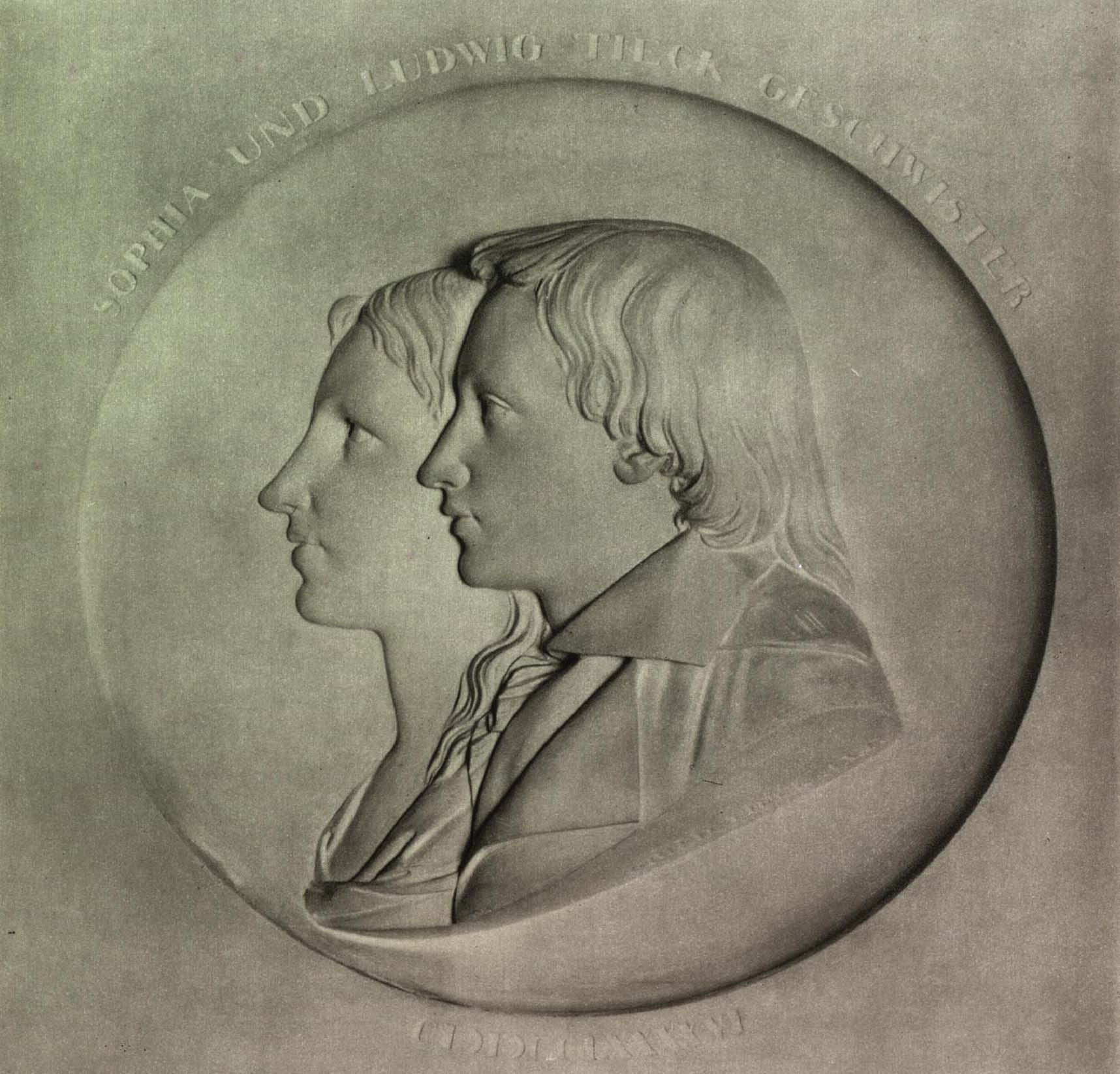
- Sophie Tieck with her brother Ludwig Tieck
- Born: 28 February 1775; Berlin, Kingdom of Prussia, Holy Roman Empire
- Died: 1 October 1833 (aged 58); Reval (now Tallinn), Governorate of Estonia, Russian Empire
- Spouse: August Ferdinand Bernhardi

Sophie Tieck (28 February 1775 – 1 October 1833), later known as Sophie Bernhardi or Sophie von Knorring, was a German Romantic writer and poet. Her role as a writer of the Romantic period was overshadowed by her brother Ludwig and her first husband, August Ferdinand Bernhardi. She was only really appreciated as an important writer when her letters were published in the 1960s.

== Life ==
Tieck was born in Berlin in 1775 to Ludwig and Ann Sophie Tieck. Her father was a rope maker. She was the middle child of three and, unlike her two brothers, she was educated at home by her mother. Her elder brother was Ludwig Tieck, also a notable writer, whilst her younger brother Friedrich was a successful sculptor.

Sophie and Ludwig worked closely together particularly in the period 1795–96, when they worked on stories for Friedrich Nicholai's Ostrich Feathers. Ludwig submitted sixteen stories but eight (or nine) of these were from the pen of Sophie. It has been said that their relationship was "too close" and may have been incestuous, with literary criticism later identifying the character Bertha (the main character's wife, who is revealed to be his half-sister) in Ludwig's "Der blonde Eckbert" as being based on Sophie. They wrote and performed plays, translated Shakespeare and read the works of the Enlightenment. When the Shakespeare translations were published it was Ludwig who took the credit. This was not an oversight, as when Ludwig's daughter Dorothea Tieck also translated Shakespeare's other works her father forgot to credit her too.

In 1799 Sophie married a fellow writer and translator, August Ferdinand Bernhardi, who had taught her brother. Bernhardi also published stories and he collaborated with Sophie. He continued Ludwig's habit and did not credit his wife. He published a three-volume work, the last volume of which is thought to have been written almost entirely by Sophie, although she was not acknowledged. The marriage was not happy and she had an affair with the poet and translator August Wilhelm Schlegel. Sophie left with her two children. There was a legal fight over the custody of the children whilst the divorce in 1807 caused a stir. Sophie went travelling with her brother Ludwig to Rome where she met the Baltic German Karl Gregor von Knorring from Reval, Estonia. The three of them went on a grand tour of Munich, Prague and Vienna, before Sophie and von Knorring set up house together in Munich.

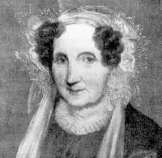
Sophie Tieck

Tieck married von Knorring in 1810 and converted to Catholicism on account of him, provoking considerable comment. They moved in 1812 to his estate in Erwita and von Knorring supported his wife well. They lived in Heidelberg in 1820 and then in Estonia until she died in 1833 in Reval (Tallinn), where she was buried in the now-destroyed Kopli Cemetery.

== Legacy ==
Her novel was not published until 1836, three years after her death. Her son William also published three volumes of his parents' stories in 1847; in these it is clear which parent wrote which story. Her letters were not available until the 1960s but she is now well regarded as a result. Her works are confused with those of her brother and her first husband. For example, eight or nine of the sixteen stories submitted by Ludwig for Straußfedern (1787–1798) were by Sophie.

== Work ==
- Bambocciaden. vol. 2, co-author: August Ferdinand Bernhardi, Berlin 1799
- Bambocciaden. vol. 3, co-author: August Ferdinand Bernhardi, Berlin 1800
- Lebensansicht. In: Athenaeum, vol. 3, Berlin 1800
- Ballade. S. 64–78, Bilder der Kindheit. pp. 129–132 In: Musen-Almanach für das Jahr 1802, ed.: August Wilhelm Schlegel, Ludwig Tieck Tübingen 1802
- Wunderbilder und Träume in eilf Mährchen. Königsberg 1802
- Dramatische Fantasien. Berlin 1804
- Egidio und Isabella. Ein Trauerspiel in drei Aufzügen. In: Dichtergarten, Würzburg 1807, p. 183–334
- Klagen I–IV. In: Dichtergarten, Würzburg 1807, pp. 167–170
- Flore und Blanscheflur. Berlin 1822
- Evremont. vol. 3, Breslau 1836
- Reliquien: Erzählungen u. Dichtungen. co-author: August Ferdinand Bernhardi, Altenburg 1847
