= Christoph Schlegel =

German Lutheran theologian

Christoph Schlegel (also known as von Gottleben, von Gottlieben; January 1, 1613 – July 2, 1678) was a German Lutheran theologian.

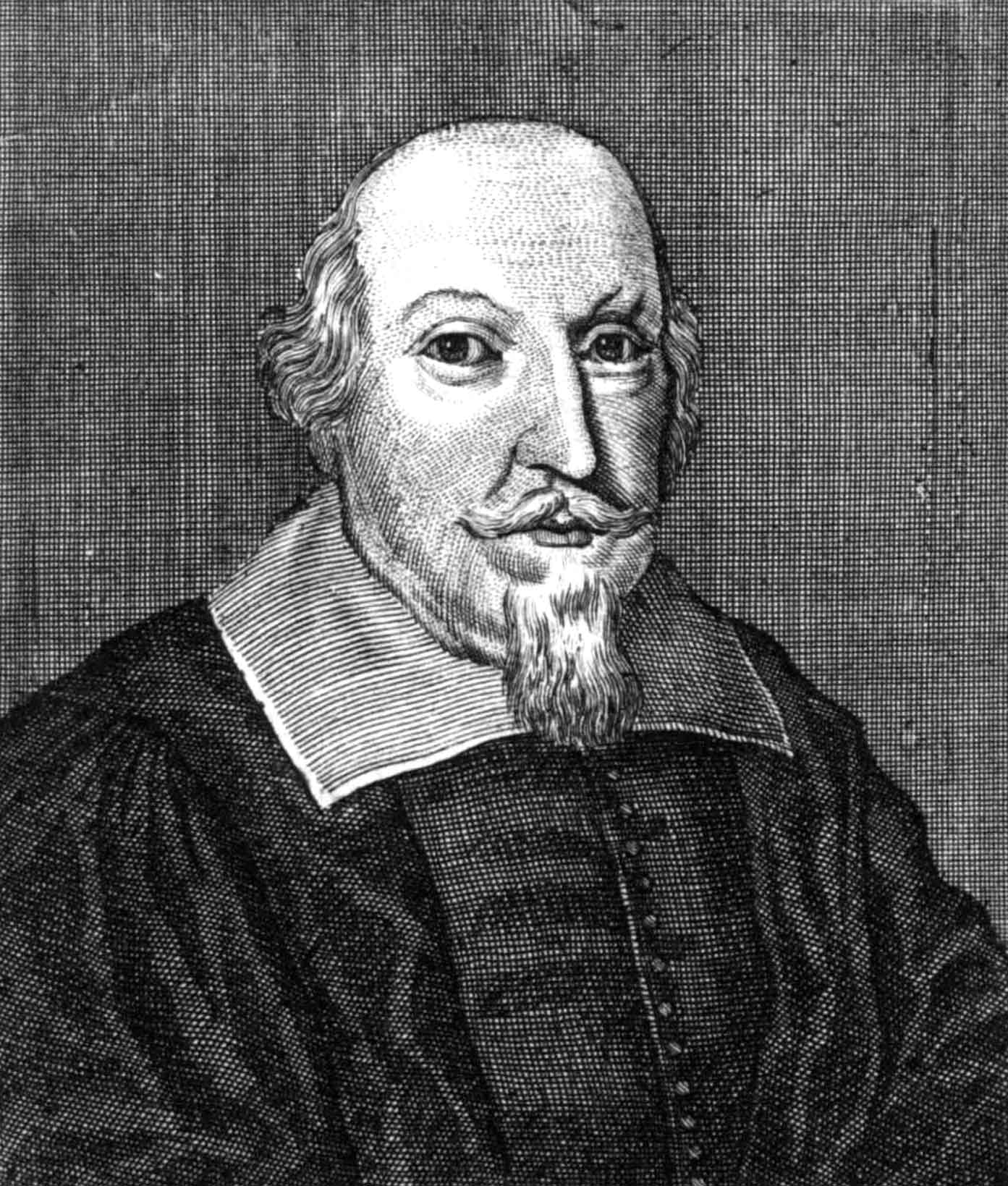
Christoph Schlegel (1613–1678)

== Early life and education ==
Christoph was the son of Martin Schlegel, the Saxon court preacher and superintendent in Weißensee, and his wife Maria Faber (October 3, 1586 – October 6, 1676), who was the daughter of Pastor Zachäus Faber. He received his initial education starting in 1618 at the Kreuzschule in Dresden. In the summer semester of 1627, he enrolled at the University of Leipzig, where he initially pursued studies in philosophy. He earned his Bachelor of Philosophy degree on March 22, 1628, and his Master of Philosophy on January 28, 1630. During his studies, he attracted attention for his poetry and was awarded a poet's crown by Matthias Hoë von Hoënegg.

He then turned to theological studies, enrolling in the summer semester of 1631 at the University of Jena, where he especially attended the lectures of Johann Gerhard. On May 18, 1633, he continued his studies at the University of Wittenberg under Wilhelm Leyser and Johann Hülsemann.

== Career ==
In 1633, he was appointed court preacher and tutor to the children of the widowed Princess Magdalene of Anhalt-Zerbst (1585–1657) in Coswig (Anhalt). He assumed this role following his ordination at Wittenberg in 1634. Continuing his theological education, he earned a licentiate in theology from the University of Wittenberg on February 22, 1638.

On May 17, 1638, he moved to Breslau (now Wrocław) as a deacon (midday preacher) at the Elisabeth Church, where he also became a consistorial assessor and a professor of religion and literature at the Elisabeth Gymnasium.

On November 10, 1644, he was appointed provost of the collegiate churches of the Holy Cross and St. Bartholomew. The following year, on October 14, 1645, he received his Doctor of Theology degree from the University of Wittenberg.

In 1647, he accepted a call as superintendent and senior pastor in Leutschau, Hungary (now Levoča, Slovakia). During this time, on August 14, 1651, Emperor Ferdinand III ennobled him into the Hungarian nobility, granting him the name addition “von Gottleben.” Subsequently, he adopted a coat of arms depicting a miner wielding a hammer. However, since he could not tolerate the climate in Leutschau and fell ill, he resigned from his position there in 1656.

He returned to his native region and spent some time as a private scholar in Lauban (now Lubań, Poland) and Pirna. In 1660, he became senior pastor and superintendent in Herzberg, and on June 6, 1662, he took up the same position in Grimma, where he died a few years later.

== Family ==
Christoph Schlegel was an ancestor of the poets August Wilhelm Schlegel and Friedrich von Schlegel. He was married twice.

His first marriage (September 12, 1639, in Breslau) was to Magdalene Tilisch (1621–1646), daughter of Hieronymus Tilisch, a legal official in Breslau, and Magdalene Thiel. They had five children—two sons and three daughters.

After Magdalene's death, Schlegel married Rosina Gloger (1623–1682) on October 5, 1648, in Leutschau. She was the daughter of a merchant, Christoph Gloger, and Rosina Kretschmer.

=== Children from first marriage (to Magdalene Tilisch) ===
- Christoph Gottlieb Schlegel (May 30, 1640 – June 19, 1697)
- Magdalena Dorothea Schlegel (July 10, 1641 – July 5, 1642)
- Christoph Schlegel Jr. (January 10, 1643 – November 16, 1691)
- Maria Dorothea Schlegel (November 23, 1644 – January 6, 1706)
- Unnamed daughter (stillborn on January 16, 1646) (Note: Aus der Ehe Schlegel/Hertel kennt man: So. Christoph Friedrich Schlegel (* 26. Oktober 1676 in Grimma; † 1772 York County (Pennsylvania)), Wintersemester 1683 Uni. Leipzig, To. Magdalena Dorothea Schlegel (* 2. Mai 1678 in Grimma; † 22. Dezember 1743 ebenda) verh. mit dem Materialisten in Grimma Johann Georg Naumann, So. Johann Gottlieb Schlegel (* 3. September 1680 in Grimma), So. Gottfried Schlegel (* 23. Oktober 1683 in Grimma) So. Christian Reinhard Schlegel (* 11. Dezember 1688 in Grimma) (Translation: From the marriage of Schlegel and Hertel, the following children are known: Son Christoph Friedrich Schlegel (* October 26, 1676 in Grimma; † 1772 in York County, Pennsylvania), enrolled at the University of Leipzig in the winter semester of 1683; Daughter Magdalena Dorothea Schlegel (* May 2, 1678 in Grimma; † December 22, 1743 in Grimma), married to the merchant Johann Georg Naumann in Grimma; Son Johann Gottlieb Schlegel (* September 3, 1680 in Grimma); Son Gottfried Schlegel (* October 23, 1683 in Grimma); Son Christian Reinhard Schlegel (* December 11, 1688 in Grimma).))

=== Children from second marriage (to Rosina Gloger) ===
- Rosine Magdalene Schlegel (April 13, 1650 – October 9, 1701)
- Polykarp Schlegel (January 16, 1652 – June 13, 1670)
- Anna Susanna Schlegel (March 30, 1653 – date unknown)
- Sophie Christiane Schlegel (April 3, 1655 – June 21, 1670)
- Ernst Friedrich Schlegel (August 13, 1657 – May 17, 1727)
- Jacob Reinhard Schlegel (August 9, 1662 – 1686)
- Gottfried Siegmund Schlegel (February 9, 1662 – November 18, 1727)
- Johannes Elias Schlegel (September 25, 1664 – September 20, 1718)

== Work and literature ==
In addition to lay sermons, Schlegel authored several scholarly and theological works, including:

- A dissertation on human understanding (Leipzig, 1630)
- A theological disputation on the universality of grace (Wittenberg, 1638)
- A commentary on Psalm 110 titled The Royal Priesthood of Christ (published in Breslau, Leipzig, and London)
- A theological explanation of Matthew 27 (Hakeldama)
- A treatise on the miraculous conception of Christ (Breslau, 1638)
