= Johann Adolf Schlegel =

German poet and clergyman (1721–1793)

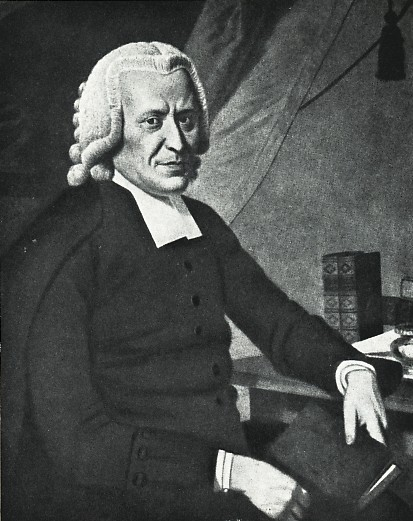
Johann Adolf Schlegel

Johann Adolf Schlegel (17 September 1721 – 16 September 1793) was a German poet and Lutheran pastor.

== Biography ==
Schlegel was born in Meißen, Saxony on 17 September 1721, and was the brother of poet Johann Elias Schlegel (1719–1749) and Johann Heinrich Schlegel (1726–1780).

His parents were Collegiate Syndicate Johann Friedrich Schlegel (1689–1748) and his wife Maria Rebecca Schlegel, nee Wilcke (1695–1736), daughter of Superintendent Georg Leberecht Wilcke. His paternal grandfather was Appellationsrat Johann Elias Schlegel (1664–1718). His paternal grandmother Johanna Dorothea Schlegel (1670–1726) was a daughter of the Saxon chief clerk Paul Andreas Vockel (1623–1684) and Christine Marie Sultzberger (born 1640).

He was a greatgrandson of Superintendent Christoph Schlegel (1613–1678) and greatgreatgrandson of Theologian Martin Schlegel (1581–1640). After finishing his studies in Leipzig, he became a deacon and teacher at Pforta in 1751. In 1754, he became a pastor and professor in Zerbst, before moving to become a pastor in Hannover at the Marktkirche in 1759. He rose to the consistory of the Hanoverian Lutheran Church and the deanship at the Neustädter Kirche in 1775, dying in Hanover in 1793.

He was a noted contributor to the Bremer Beiträge, a literary journal popular at the time. Despite his active work in literary circles, only one hymn has survived to the present day out of all his poetry and musical works. He also published a commentary on Charles Batteux's Les beaux-arts réduits à un même principe, translating it into German.

Schlegel died in Hanover, Brunswick-Lüneburg.

== Family ==
Johann Adolf Schlegel was married to Johanna Christiane Erdmuthe Hübsch (1735–1811), daughter of math teacher Johann George Gotthelf Hübsch (1689–1773) and his wife Johanna Sophie Hübsch, nee Walter (1710–1768).

They had ten children. His youngest sons, writer and literary historian August Wilhelm Schlegel (1767–1845) and philosopher and literary historian Friedrich Schlegel (1772–1829), were influential early members of the Romantic movement. The other children were:

- Gotthelf Adolph Friedrich Schlegel (1753–1766),
- Georg Adolph Bonaventura Schlegel (1755–1782),
- General Superintendent Karl August Moritz Schlegel (1756–1826), Consistorial Councillor and member of the Assembly of Estates for the Kingdom of Hanover Johann Carl Fürchtegott Schlegel (1758–1831),
- Erdmuthe Charlotte Friederike Schlegel (1759–1826), who was married to Ludwig Emmanuel Ernst (1756–1826),
- Henriette Wilhelmine Schlegel (1761–1801), who was married to Johann Sigismund Ernst (1760–1834),
- Cartographer Carl August Schlegel (1762–1789),
- Friedrich Anton Heinrich Schlegel (1764–1784).

Johann Adolf Schlegel's niece Friederike Henriette Eleonore Schlegel (1748–1825), was married classical philologist and school principal in Plauen Gottlieb Wilhelm Irmisch (1732–1794) and was mother of Eleonore Wilhelmine Irmisch (1773–1851), who married portraitist Veit Hanns Schnorr von Carolsfeld (1764–1841), and others nephew was Danish jurist Johan Frederik Vilhelm Schlegel (1765–1836), who was a son of his brother Johann Heinrich Schlegel.
