= Foundations of Natural Right =

1797 text by Johann Gottlieb Fichte

Foundations of Natural Right (German: Grundlagen des Naturrechts nach Prinzipien der Wissenschaftslehre) is a philosophical text by the German philosopher Johann Gottlieb Fichte and it was first published in 1797. The book is one of Fichte's most important and one of his broadest books in terms of subjects covered.

The book begins with the subject of self-consciousness. Fichte believes that self-consciousness requires resistance from exterior objects, but this resistance can only come from other rational beings, making consciousness a social phenomenon. Because of this, people are inevitably involved in relations with others that Fichte calls a 'relation of right.' The relation of right relies on mutual recognition of rationality and consciousness by all parties involved. Each conscious agent, Fichte thinks, should retain their own 'sphere of freedom' in which they are free from outside forces.

As the text continues, Fichte uses the idea of the 'sphere of freedom' to establish what he calls 'original right.' Original right is a fictitious concept in which a being can exist only as a cause, and never be caused or effected by exterior forces. To violate one's original right is to violate one's freedom and to commit coercion.

To combat coercion, Fichte suggests taking away any incentive to commit such a crime. Namely, there must be a society that, whenever one attempts to commit a crime, the exact opposite of the criminal's intention will occur. He then concludes that a society such as this could only exist in a commonwealth, and goes on to discuss the exact nature of such a commonwealth.
