= An Attempt at a Critique of All Revelation =

Work by Johann Gottlieb Fichte

An Attempt at a Critique of All Revelation (German: Versuch einer Critik aller Offenbarung; 1792) was the first published work by Johann Gottlieb Fichte. Fichte went to visit Immanuel Kant on 4 July 1791 and his first interview did not go well, so he wrote An Attempt at a Critique of All Revelation in order to impress him. An impressed Kant then asked his publisher to print it. It was briefly mistaken by the public to be a fourth Critique by Kant, as the work was initially published with no author or preface. After Fichte was revealed as the book's author, Fichte received praise and attention in the world of German philosophy.

In this work, Fichte argued that any revelation in relation to God must be consistent with morality, which was against many aspects of orthodox Christian belief at the time.

== Notes and references ==
Fichte, in Stanford Encyclopedia of Philosophy: https://plato.stanford.edu/entries/johann-fichte/
