= Bremer Beiträge =

German literary magazine (1744–1759)

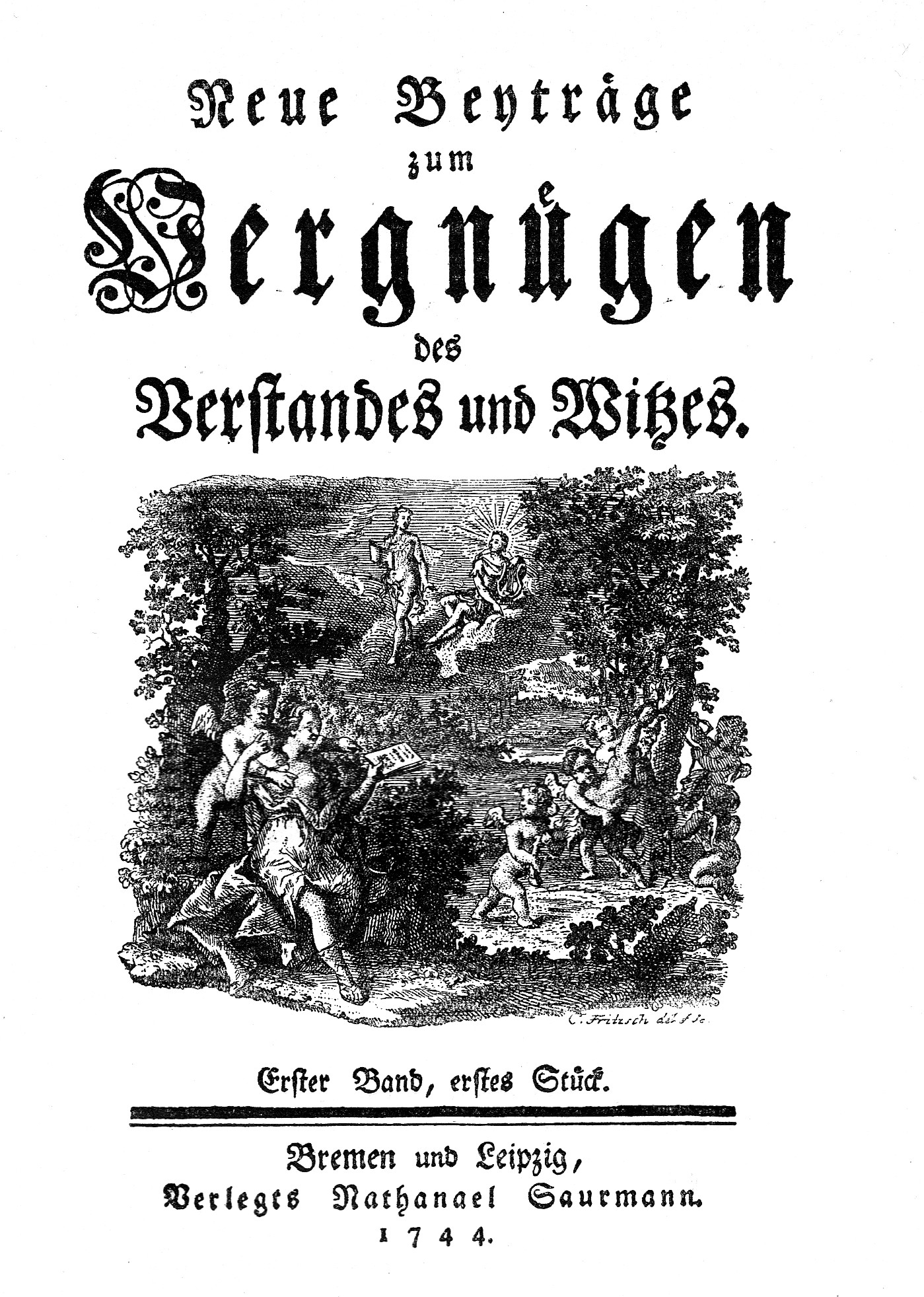
Front of first issue of the Bremer Beiträge, 1744

Bremer Beiträge was the designation for the weekly magazine Neue Beyträge zum Vergnügen des Verstandes und Witzes ("New contributions to the pleasure of the mind and wit"). It was published from 1744 to 1759 during the Age of Enlightenment.

== History ==
The magazine was founded in Bremen in 1744 by the writer Karl Christian Gärtner. It was published by Nathanael Saurmann and was considered a mouthpiece of the Saxon school of poetry. Together with Gärtner, Johann Andreas Cramer, Johann Arnold Ebert, Gottlieb Wilhelm Rabener, Johann Adolf Schlegel, and Konrad Arnold Schmid worked since the founding of the magazine.

Later contributors included Christian Fürchtegott Gellert, Nikolaus Dietrich Giseke, Friedrich Gottlieb Klopstock, Christlob Mylius, and Justus Friedrich Wilhelm Zachariae. It was here that Klopstock published the first cantos of his epic poem Der Messias.

== See also ==
- Johann Christoph Gottsched

== Edition ==
- Neue Beyträge zum Vergnügen des Verstandes und Witzes. Hildesheim: Olms, 1978. (Microfiche edition, reprint of Bremen, 1744−1759.
