= Zachäus Faber the Elder =

German Lutheran theologian (1554–1628)

Zachäus Faber the Elder (1554–1628) was a German Lutheran clergyman, theologian, and hymn writer who played a prominent role in the spiritual and intellectual life of Saxony during the late 16th and early 17th centuries.

== Life ==
Faber was born in 1554 in Beucha. After attending the University of Leipzig in 1573 and the University of Wittenberg in 1574, he began working in 1576, first as a teacher and then as rector of the municipal school in Torgau. He matriculated at the University of Wittenberg on 22 August 1581 and earned the academic degree of Master of Philosophy there on 9 September 1581. Following his ordination at the town church of Wittenberg on 18 March 1584, he took up the position of pastor in Plossig. In 1593, he transferred to a pastorate in Röcknitz; in the same capacity, he briefly moved to Prettin in 1609 and later that year became pastor in Hohenleina. Faber married Dorothea Gentzsch (buried 4 February 1630 in Torgau), the daughter of Martin Gentzsch, pastor in Elsnig. The marriage produced several children:

- Zachäus Faber the Younger
- Maria Faber, who married Martin Schlegel in 1606 and, in 1645, Martin Uthmann, mayor of Weißensee
- Barbara Faber, who married Jerimias Hickmann, deacon in Frauenprießnitz

== Work and Literature ==
- Fröhlich wir nun all fangen an den Gottesdienst mit Schalle. In: Evangelisches Gesangbuch. Nr. 159, 1601.
- Albert Fischer: In: . C. Bertelsmann, Gütersloh 1904, S. 57–62 (Textarchiv – Internet Archive – Lieder Nr. 75 bis 82, hier ist Chemnitz als Geburtsort angegeben).
- Faber, (Zach.). In: Johann Heinrich Zedler: Grosses vollständiges Universal-Lexicon Aller Wissenschafften und Künste. Band 9, Leipzig 1735, Blatt 27.
- . In: Christian Gottlieb Jöcher (Hrsg.): . Band 2: D–L. Johann Friedrich Gleditsch, Leipzig 1750, Sp. 474 (books.google.de).
- Verfasserverzeichnis des evangelischen Gesangbuchs; Nummer 159, S. 1095.
- Dietmar Pistorius: Faber (der Ältere), Zachäus.In: Wolfgang Herbst: Wer ist wer im Gesangbuch? Vandenhoeck und Ruprecht, Göttingen, 2001, ISBN 3-525-50323-7, S. 87, (books.google.de Leseprobe).
- Hans-Joachim Böttcher: Faber (der Ältere), Zachäus. In: Bedeutende historische Persönlichkeiten der Dübener Heide. AMF, Nr. 237, 2012, S. 24.

== Memorial ==
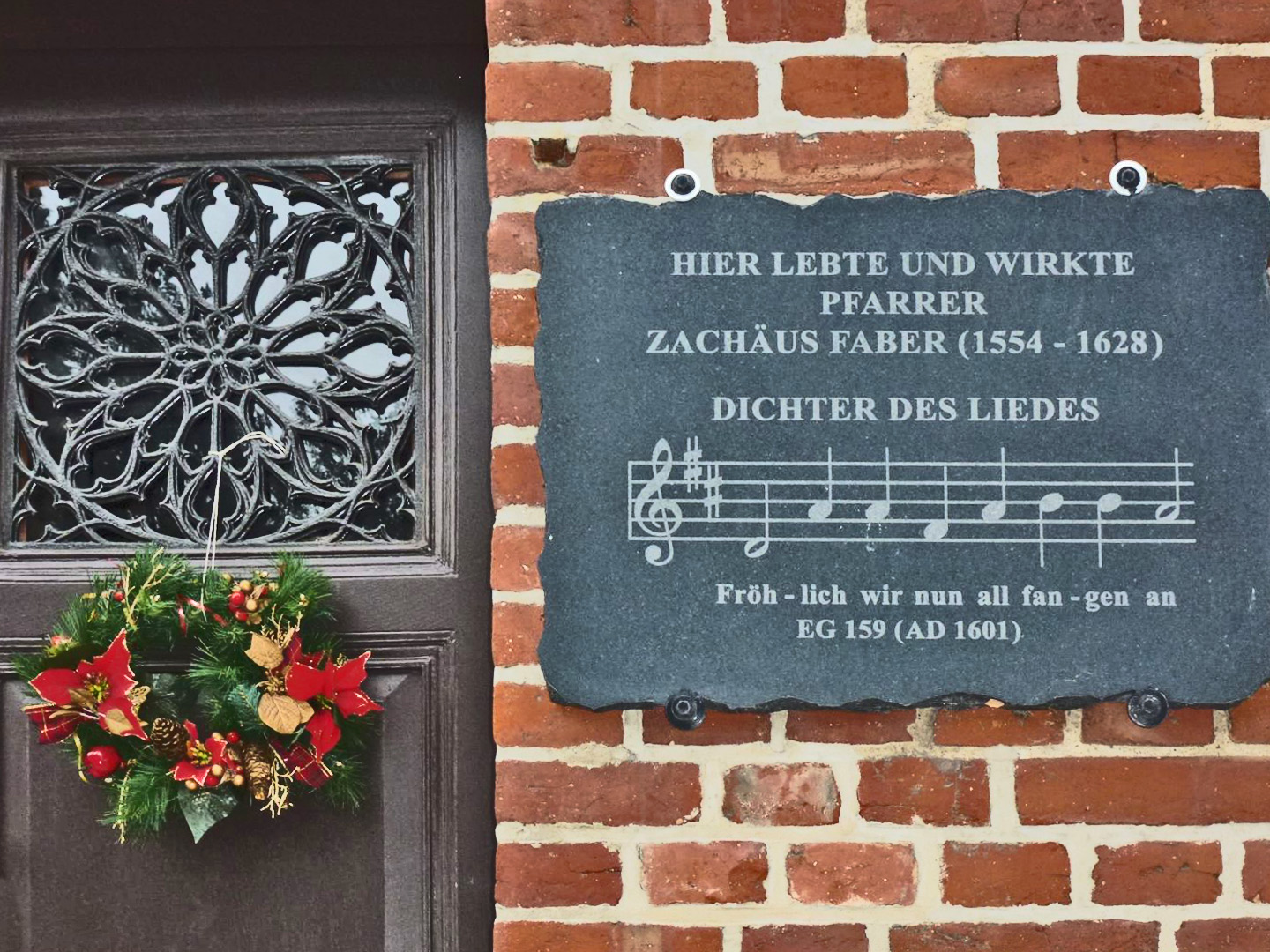
Memorial plaque in honor of Pastor Faber

A plaque at the rectory in Krostitz honors Zachäus Faber, who was a pastor at St. Laurentius Church.
