= Georg Meri =

Estonian diplomat and translator (1900–1983)

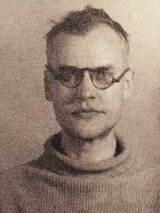
Meri following his arrest by the NKVD in 1941

Georg-Peeter Meri (7 October 1900 – 10 June 1983) was an Estonian diplomat, literary scholar and translator.

He took part in Estonian War of Independence, belonging to Tallinn Defence Battalion.

From 1934 to 1938, he was a diplomat of Estonia to Germany.

In 1938, he was awarded with Order of the White Star, III class.

His son was Estonian president Lennart Meri.
