= Martin Schlegel (theologian) =

German Lutheran theologian

Martin Schlegel (1581 - August 4, 1640) was a German Lutheran theologian. He served as the third court preacher in Dresden, the capital of the Electorate of Saxony, and later as superintendent in Weißensee, Thuringia. He was the direct ancestor of the literary and linguistic scholars August Wilhelm Schlegel and Friedrich von Schlegel.

== Life ==
Schlegel originated from the Ore Mountains (Erzgebirge) region and bore a surname typical for mining families. His father was Paul Schlegel, a citizen of Dippoldiswalde. On June 14, 1596, he enrolled at the Gymnasium in Freiberg, later continuing his studies at the University of Leipzig. He first served as a deacon in Kmehlen, and in 1615 became the Protestant pastor of the St. George Church in Zabeltitz. Beginning in 1618, he was appointed as the third court preacher at the Dresden court under Elector John George I of Saxony. In 1623, he was named in the Thuringian administrative town of Weißensee, a position he held until his death, serving throughout the years of the Thirty Years' War.

Among his publications is a sermon titled Kurtze Christliche Trawung und Hochzeitspredigt, Bey dem Adelichen Beylager des Edlen [...] Hanniball von Lüttichaw uff Zschorna [...] und auch der Edlen [...] Catharinen, des [...] Heinrich von Ende [...] (Dresden, 1614).

== Family ==
In 1606, Martin Schlegel married Maria Faber (1586–1676) in Röcknitz. She was the daughter of pastor and hymnwriter Zachäus Faber. After Schlegel's death in 1640, she remarried in 1645, becoming the wife of Martin Uthmann (d. 1673), mayor of Weißensee.

Of Schlegel's three sons—who all entered the clergy—and three daughters, Christoph Schlegel von Gottleben (1613–1678) survived him. Christoph later served as superintendent in Grimma and was ennobled in 1651. Another son, Gottlieb Schlegel (1611–1636), served as praepositus in Leitmeritz (Bohemia) and became pastor in Marlishausen in 1632. He married Sophie Blanckenberger in 1633. A third son, Magister Christian Schlegel, was pastor in Greiffstadt and Rüthen.

His daughter Dorothea Schlegel married Magister Otto Wilibald Hoffmann (1600–1666), pastor in Kindelbrück. Another son, Friedrich Freudenreich Schlegel, was born in 1622.

== Literature ==
- Johann Andreas Gleich: Annales Ecclesiastici, Oder: Gründliche Nachrichten der Reformations-Historie Chur-Sächß. Albertinischer Linie ... Dritter Theil / Jn sich fassend Die Lebens-Beschreibungen und mancherley glaubwürdige Nachrichten, Derer übrigen Churfürstl. Sächßischen Herrn Hoff-Prediger, Von Anno 1613. biß zu unsern Zeiten. Dresden; Leipzig 1730 S. 638–651 (Digitalisat).
- Unschuldige Nachrichten von alten und neuen theologischen Sachen, 1719, S. 1127.
- Pfarrerbuch der Kirchenprovinz Sachsen, Bd. 7, Leipzig 2008, S. 464.
