= Johann Elias Schlegel =

German poet and critic (1719–1749)

Johann Elias Schlegel (January 17, 1719 – August 13, 1749) was a German critic and dramatic poet.

== Life ==
Schlegel was born in Meissen. He was educated at Schulpforta and at the University of Leipzig, where he studied law. In 1743, he became private secretary to his relative, von Spener, the Saxon ambassador at the Danish court. In 1748, he was made professor extraordinary at the Sorø Academy. He died on August 13, 1749 in Sorø. He is buried in the graveyard of Sorø Abbey Church.

== Works ==
Schlegel was a contributor to the Bremer Beiträge and for some time, while he was living in Denmark, edited a weekly periodical, Der Fremde. With his dramas, as well as with his critical writings he did much to prepare the way for Lessing, by whom his genius was warmly appreciated. He wrote two lively and well-constructed comedies, Der Triumph der guten Frauen and Die stumme Schönheit, the former in prose, the latter in alexandrines. Hermann and Canut (both in alexandrines) are generally considered his best tragedies.

His works were edited (in 5 vols., 1761–1770) by his brother, J. H. Schlegel (1724–1780), who had a considerable reputation as a writer on Danish history. Another brother, Johann Adolf Schlegel, an eminent preacher, and author of some volumes of verse, was the father of August Wilhelm and Friedrich von Schlegel.

== Bibliography ==
J. E. Schlegel's Asthetische und dramaturgische Schriften have been edited by J. von Antoniewicz (1887), and a selection of his plays by F. Muncker in Bremer Beiträge, vol. ii. (Kürschner's Deutsche Nalionalliteratur, vol. xliv., 1899). See, besides the biography by his brother in the edition of his works, E. Wolff, Johann Elias Schlegel (1889); and J. Rentsch, Johann Elias Schlegel als Trauerspieldichter (1890).

- Elizabeth Mary Wilkinson, Johann Elias Schlegel: A German Pioneer in Aesthetics (Oxford, 1945)
- Country Pastors by J.C. Kruger and Good Women Triumphant by J.E. Schlegel: Two Comedies of the Early Enlightenment. Translated by John W. Van Cleve. Mellen: 2019
