= Wolf Heinrich Graf von Baudissin =

Wolf Heinrich Friedrich Karl Graf von Baudissin
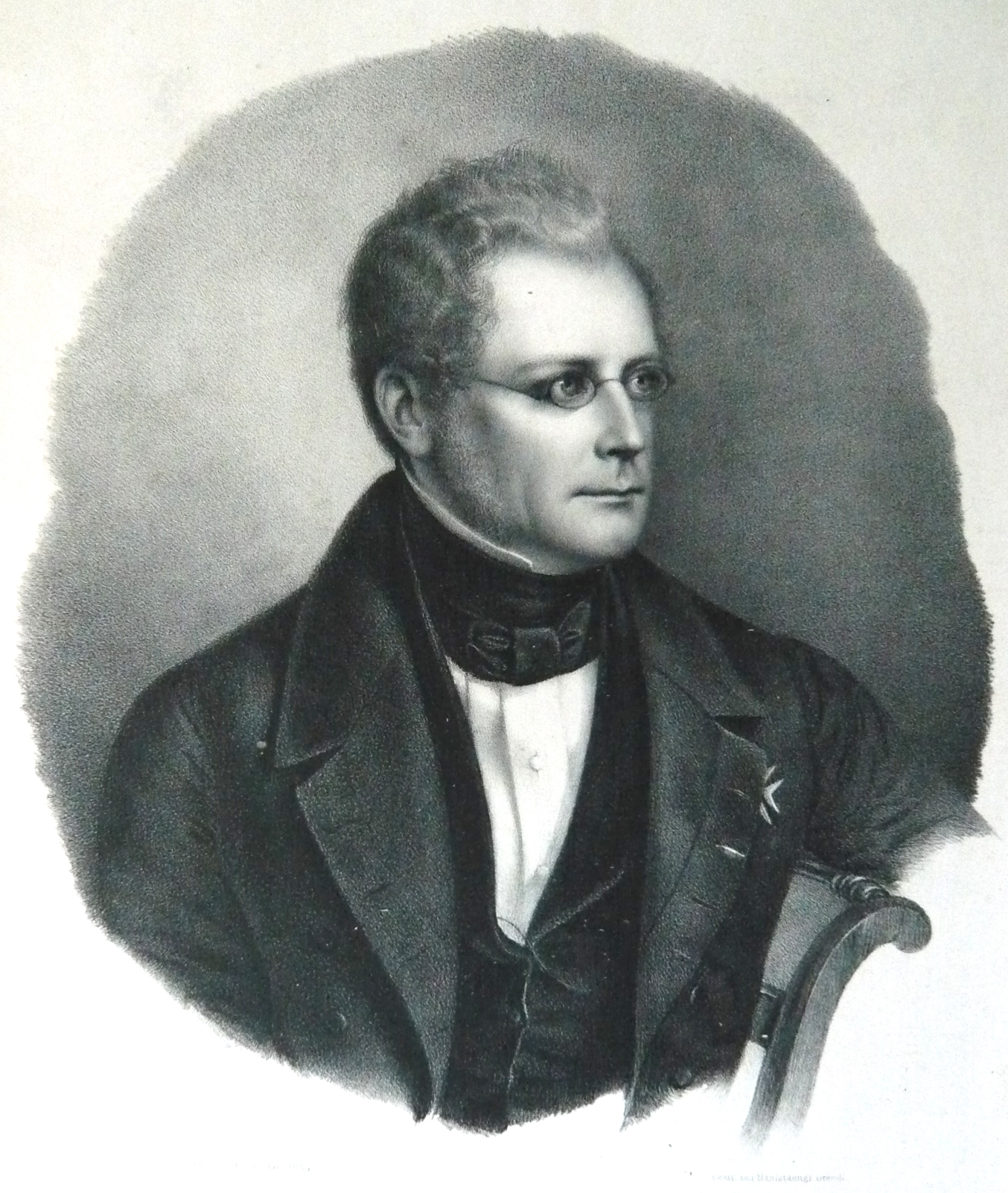
- Born: 30 January 1789; Rantzau, Holstein
- Died: 4 April 1878 (aged 89)
- Occupations: Diplomat, writer, translator
- Notable work: Translations of William Shakespeare, Molière

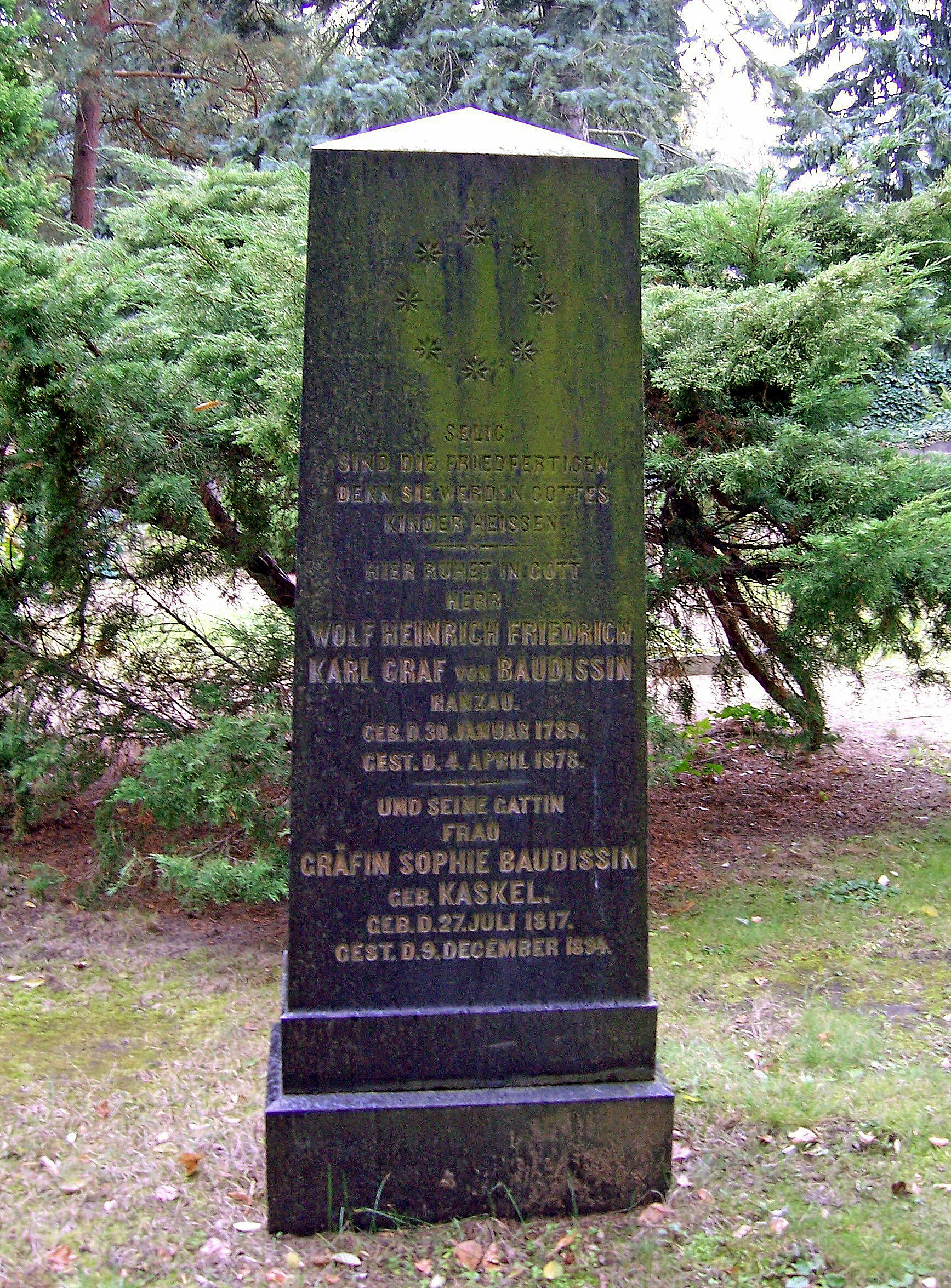
Memorial marker at Trinitatis graveyard in Dresden

Wolf Heinrich Friedrich Karl Graf von Baudissin (30 January 1789 – 4 April 1878) was a German diplomat, writer, and translator. Born in Rantzau, Holstein, in 1810 Baudissin entered the diplomatic service of the Danish government serving as secretary of legation successively in Stockholm, Vienna, and Paris. After 1827, he lived and worked in Dresden. There he collaborated on translations of William Shakespeare with August Wilhelm Schlegel, Ludwig Tieck and Dorothea Tieck. Independently, he translated Molière, Carlo Goldoni, Carlo Gozzi, and others.

== Translations ==
- Wirnt von Grafenberg, Wigalois.
- Hartmann von Aue, Iwein, 1845.
- Ben Jonson und seine Schule (Ben Jonson and his school, selected works and contextual materials), 1836.
- Molière, Complete Comedies, 1865-1867.
- William Shakespeare translations he contributed to:
  - All's Well That Ends Well
  - Antony and Cleopatra
  - Comedy of Errors
  - The Merry Wives of Windsor
  - King Lear
  - Henry VIII
  - Love's Labor's Lost
  - Measure for Measure
  - Othello
  - Taming of the Shrew
  - Titus Andronicus
  - Troilus and Cressida
  - Much Ado about Nothing
