= Dorothea Tieck =

German translator of Shakespeare

Dorothea Tieck.

Dorothea Tieck (March 1799 – 21 February 1841) was a German translator, known particularly for her translations of William Shakespeare. She was born in Berlin to Ludwig Tieck and Amalie Alberti. She collaborated with her father and his Romantic literary circle, including August Wilhelm Schlegel and Wolf Heinrich Graf von Baudissin. She completed the translation of Shakespeare's works, which her father had begun with Schlegel and Baudissin, and worked also on Miguel de Cervantes and other Spanish writers.

== Macbeth translation ==
Tieck's translation of Macbeth is particularly noted and has frequently been republished alone. Her translation of one of the play's best-known speeches follows:

Tomorrow, and tomorrow, and tomorrow,
Creeps in this petty pace from day to day,
To the last syllable of recorded time;
And all our yesterdays have lighted fools
The way to dusty death. Out, out, brief candle!
Life's but a walking shadow, a poor player
That struts and frets his hour upon the stage
And then is heard no more. It is a tale
Told by an idiot, full of sound and fury
Signifying nothing.

Morgen, und morgen, und dann wieder morgen,
Kriecht so mit kleinem Schritt von Tag zu Tag,
Zur letzten Silb auf unserm Lebensblatt;
Und alle unsre Gestern führten Narren
Den Pfad zum staubigen Tod. Aus, kleines Licht!
Leben ist nur ein wandelnd Schattenbild,
Ein armer Komödiant, der spreizt und knirscht
Sein Stündchen auf der Bühn und dann nicht mehr
Vernommen wird; ein Märchen ists, erzählt
Von einem Blödling, voller Klang und Wut,
Das nichts bedeutet.
