= The Princesses and the Frog =

- Gossip Girl episode
- Serena holds back an unstable Chuck
- Episode no.: Season 4 Episode 20
- Directed by: Andrew McCarthy
- Written by: Leila Gerstein
- Production code: 420
- Original air date: May 2, 2011

Guest appearances
- Connor Paolo as Eric van der Woodsen; Tika Sumpter as Raina Thorpe; Kaylee DeFer as Charlie Rhodes; Hugo Becker as Louis Grimaldi; Joanne Whalley as Sophie Grimaldi

Episode chronology
← Previous "Petty in Pink"	Next → "Shattered Bass"
- Gossip Girl season 4

"The Princesses and the Frog" is the 85th episode of the CW television series, Gossip Girl and the 20th episode of the show's fourth season. The episode was written by Leila Gerstein and directed by Andrew McCarthy. It originally aired on Monday, May 2, 2011 on the CW.

"The Princesses and the Frog" follows Blair Waldorf (Leighton Meester) as she pursues a relationship with Louis Grimaldi (Hugo Becker) and tries to win the approval of Princess Sophie (Joanne Whalley). Serena van der Woodsen (Blake Lively) attempts to ruin Blair by airing out every scandal she can draw out and Chuck Bass (Ed Westwick) slowly devolves into a downward spiral by investigating the disappearance of Avery Thorpe. Nate Archibald (Chace Crawford) finds himself torn between his relationship with Raina Thorpe (Tika Sumpter) and his friendship with Chuck. Vanessa Abrams (Jessica Szohr) befriends Charlie Rhodes (Kaylee DeFer) for reasons that revolve around Dan Humphrey (Penn Badgley).

The episode received mixed reviews from critics, who argued Chuck and Blair's relationship was abusive, but series executive producer Joshua Safran stated the episode did not intend to depict any abuse.

== Plot ==
Chuck (Ed Westwick) informing his P.I that he doesn't believe his father is responsible for the murder of Avery Thorpe - Raina's mother - and for him to drop the case.

Serena, on the phone to Blair, finds that her attempt to break up Louis and Blair has only made them stronger thus far. She fakes being happy for them, and afterwards explains to Eric that she is trying to break them up because Blair crossed "sacred territory" when she kissed Dan. Eric tells her off, saying that acting like Blair is no way to go on. However, Serena still seems determined to break them up.

Back in the apartment, Rufus announces that the meeting with the band went well, and he has invited them round for dinner. Eric mocks him on his 'street cred', so Rufus moves the dinner from the penthouse to his apartment back in Brooklyn.

Blair arrives at Chuck's, where he tells her that he needs her now more than before, because the only thing that's been real in his life has been her. Blair tells him about Louis' proposal, and that even though she wanted to be Chuck's for so long, she can't be anymore. In a fit of rage, Chuck punches a glass wall which in turn cuts Blair's face. Blair flees, and a watching Nate realises the extent of Chuck's problem, and calls Raina to tell him he chooses her.

At the same time, Raina is on the phone to Jack Bass, hoping to get his help with dealing with Chuck. Chuck is seen sitting alone, holding his engagement ring. Blair, still at odds with Serena, calls her mother, to tell her she's engaged.

== Production ==
The Borgias actress Joanne Whalley had been cast in an episode of Gossip Girl following a Screen Actors Guild casting notice. Whalley was rumoured to play an adversarial role to Kelly Rutherford's Lily van der Woodsen but turned out to be that of Princess Sophie, Louis Grimaldi's mother. The party at the Monégasque Embassy was filmed in the Ukrainian Institute of America on Fifth Avenue.

== Reception ==
"The Princesses and the Frog" was watched by 1.27 million live viewers and achieved a 1.5 rating in The CW's target audience of Women 18-34 and received mixed to negative reviews. The episode received negative remarks following a controversial scene of Chuck Bass subjecting what many perceived to be domestic violence to Blair Waldorf.

The Los Angeles Times' Judy Berman praised the direction of the episode, ""Gossip Girl" is finally fun to watch again. The writers pulled out all the stops this week: Glass shatters! Blood spills! Engagement rings gleam! Friends and near-strangers double-cross each other! A disastrously drunk Chuck Bass revives his catchphrase, "I'm Chuck Bass"! Even Nate earns his screen time." Steve Marsi of TV Fanatic however, had mixed reviews regarding the episode, stating the overall narrative "felt sorely lacking." and that the plot lines "became really twisted and confusing and the relationships too tangential." Serena's actions throughout the episode were called out, followed by Chuck's slow downward spiral that culminated in forcing himself on Blair. Marsi continued his review on Chuck, stating that his behavior "leaves little room for redemption". The sudden absence of Dan and Blair's relationship was panned by Marsi, who disapproved of the lack of interaction between the two characters. New York Magazine hailed the return of Nate and Chuck's "bromance", praised the change of direction for the character of Charlie, and Blair dating prince but generally panned the episode for its shortcomings and the closing scene. Chris Rovar and Jessica Pressler hoped that the show "could make it up in the coming weeks."

Charlie Rhodes became the subject of praise with her successful integration into the Upper East side. Marsi praised her choosing to confront Vanessa alone, calling her "a natural" at schemes and that "even an outsider can thoroughly outshine an outcast." TV Guide praised the ousting of Vanessa by Charlie, stating that "it didn't take her long to cross over to "the other side"".

Serena van der Woodsen's actions throughout the episode received negative reviews. New York Magazine called out her character inconsistency and Serena's actions against Blair, "as much as this show has tried to teach us that nobody can be trusted and any friend will turn on another at the drop of the hat, we really don’t believe that Serena would go so far out of her way to ruin Blair’s chance to be a princess just because Blair once kissed Dan (whom Serena isn’t dating and is related to). It just doesn’t make sense." Berman noticed her abrupt change in character, stating "It's a pretty evil, slightly out-of-character move, and S spends most of the episode looking conflicted over what she's done."

=== Controversy ===
Following the 20th episode of Season 4, Safran spoke on Chuck's violence in the episode:

The way we viewed [the violence], I think it's very clear that Blair is not afraid in those moments. [She and Chuck] have a volatile relationship but I do not believe it is abuse [because] Chuck has never, and will never, hurt Blair. He knows it and she knows it, and I feel it's very important to know that she is not scared—if anything, she is scared for Chuck—and what he might do to himself, but she is never afraid of what he might do to her.

In response to these comments, Carina MacKenzie of Zap2it stated, "We're left wondering if Safran missed the part where she went home bleeding because Chuck was using physical intimidation to release his own emotions." PerezHilton.com also disagreed with the show's decision to rationalize Chuck's behavior as "passion". The site further stated, "Is this what the writers and crew want to showcase to their audience? That it's okay to treat the supposed love of your life like this because you're going through 'issues?' "

While reviewing the episode, Tierney Bricker of Zap2it remarked that there were "really no excuses for Chuck Bass anymore." MacKenzie concluded that Chuck's behavior throughout Season 4 fit the signs of an abusive relationship, citing examples from HelpGuide.org, a non-profit health resource. She noted Chuck's public humiliation of Blair, his attempt to pawn her during a business deal, and his use of physical intimidation. MacKenzie also called the show's explanation "disturbing, particularly given the young, female target demographic of Gossip Girl and The CW."

Berman later addressed Safran's description of the controversial scene. "Considering how terrified Blair looked at the end of their encounter, and how quickly she got out of there, the show is sending a mixed message at best." She went on to state, "We have no right to expect Gossip Girl to be a paragon of morality, or even realism, but the idea that true love requires taking a shard of glass to the face is disturbing even in this alternate, soap-opera dimension."
