= Yes, Then Zero =

- Gossip Girl episode
- Episode no.: Season 5 Episode 1
- Directed by: Mark Piznarski
- Written by: Joshua Safran
- Production code: 501
- Original air date: September 26, 2011 (The CW)

Guest appearances
- Zuzanna Szadkowski as Dorota Kishlovsky; Margaret Colin as Eleanor Waldorf Rose; Hugo Becker as Louis Grimaldi; Joanne Whalley as Princess Sophie Grimaldi; Ethan Peck as man on the bench; Elizabeth Hurley as Diana Payne; Jay McInerney as Jeremiah Harris; Michael Michele as Jane; Brian J. Smith as Max Harding; Simon Miller as Patrick Roberts; Jenny Lewis as herself; Johnathan Rice as himself; Zoë Bell as herself

Episode chronology
← Previous "The Wrong Goodbye"	Next → "Beauty and the Feast"
- Gossip Girl season 5

"Yes, Then Zero" is the 88th episode of the CW television series, Gossip Girl, as well as the first episode of the show's fifth season. The episode was written by executive producer Joshua Safran and directed by Mark Piznarski. It aired on Monday, September 26, 2011 on the CW.

"Yes, Then Zero" opens the fifth season with most of the cast settled in Los Angeles for the summer. Serena van der Woodsen (Blake Lively) has found a job working for a production company but finds herself at odds with a co-worker. Chuck Bass (Ed Westwick) and Nate Archibald (Chace Crawford) spend the summer together as Chuck adopts a new philosophy that could potentially endanger him while the mysterious Diana Payne (Elizabeth Hurley) takes an interest in Nate. Dan Humphrey (Penn Badgley) asks a favor from an engaged Prince Louis (Hugo Becker) to keep his work from getting published. Blair Waldorf (Leighton Meester) faces tension from Louis' mother regarding the wedding preparations and her relationship with Louis. Ivy Dickens (Kaylee DeFer) is forced to reprise her role as Charlie Rhodes when she runs into Serena in Los Angeles.

== Plot ==
Serena finds a job as a production assistant while spending her summer in L.A. Nearing the end of the shoot of David O. Russell’s adaptation of The Beautiful and the Damned, Marshall, her supervisor, assigns her to complete his to-do list. Serena successfully completes the tasks, including picking up medical marijuana for the star of the movie, a task Marshall has added to get Serena fired since the star must remain sober during production. Serena takes responsibility for almost shutting down production and is offered a job by Jane, the movie’s producer. At a restaurant, Serena bumps into Ivy Dickens who ditches her job waitressing and her boyfriend Max to leave with Serena as Charlie Rhodes.

Nate and Chuck also arrive in Los Angeles, where Nate meets an older woman at a house party and Chuck starts making increasingly reckless decisions. Nate pretends to own the house where he, Chuck, and Serena attend a party to see how it feels to be someone else. Nate has sex with the unnamed older woman who then reveals herself to be the real owner of the house and kicks Nate out. After receiving his save-the-date for Blair and Louis’ wedding, Chuck jumps out of a building on to a stunt pad on the set of the film where Serena is working and crashes his motorcycle by driving too fast on a dangerous winding road, sustaining a large bruise to his torso.

Meanwhile, after spending the summer in Monaco, Blair returns to New York with Louis to hasten the preparation of her wedding while trying to conceal that she is pregnant. She battles with Louis’ mother Sophie about her wedding dress and bouquet. Blair is frustrated that Louis is not standing up to his mother.

Dan learns a chapter of his book about the Upper East Side that will embarrass Blair has been leaked to Vanity Fair and asks Louis for help preventing its publication. Louis stands up Blair for their date to a UN gala to go kill the story. Blair takes this as the last straw and visits Dan in Brooklyn, asking him to take her away to the Hamptons so she can break off her engagement to Louis. Before they can leave together, Louis arrives and explains what he was doing and Dan confirms the story. Blair is hurt and confused about why Dan would let her walk away from Louis when Dan knew Louis was protecting her. Gossip Girl comments in voiceover, "Lonely boy learning three words, eight letters don’t come out right when no one wants to hear them.”

== Production ==
Blair (Leighton Meester) wore an Oscar de la Renta dress, while Serena (Blake Lively) wore a Catherine Malandrino dress. Diana Payne (Elizabeth Hurley) wore dresses designed by Dolce & Gabbana and Herve Leger.

=== Casting ===
American musicians, Jenny Lewis and Johnathan Rice made a cameo portraying themselves throughout the episode.

=== Music ===
The song "Kinda Outta Luck" by Lana Del Rey is used in promo video from episode. The episode features the single "My Pet Snake" from the first studio album of Jenny and Johnny, entitled I'm Having Fun Now. It also features song Bad Karma by "Ida Maria"

== Reception ==
"Yes, Then Zero" received mixed reviews and was watched by 1.37 million viewers. TV Fanatic gave the episode positive reviews opening the show's return to creative form. "The question heading into Season Five of Gossip Girl is whether the show will return to what made it great - humor, heart and a healthy dose of scandal - or continue on the path last season went down, with convoluted, over-the-top stories and, worse yet, our beloved characters not even acting like themselves. So, did tonight offer fans reason for hope? Yes is most definitely the word. Between the pregnancy reveal - so surprising I really didn't think Gossip Girl of all shows would go there - the tie-in with Daniel's novel, Nate's latest liaison and Chuck channeling his inner James Dean, "Yes, Then Zero" was a resounding success. We can only hope future episodes build on this and don't fizzle out."
