= Raiders of the Lost Art =

Raiders of the Lost Art may refer to:

- "Raiders of the Lost Art" (Gossip Girl), episode 109 of Gossip Girl
- "Raiders of the Lost Art" (Legends of Tomorrow), episode 25 of Legends of Tomorrow

== See also ==
- Raiders of the Lost Ark
