= The Backup Dan =

- Gossip Girl episode
- Episode no.: Season 5 Episode 14
- Directed by: David Warren
- Written by: Matt Whitney
- Original air date: February 6, 2012 (The CW)
- Running time: 42 minutes

Guest appearances
- Michelle Trachtenberg as Georgina Sparks; Zuzanna Szadkowski as Dorota Kishlovsky; Hugo Becker as Prince Louis Grimaldi; Joanne Whalley as Princess Sophie Grimaldi; Margaret Colin as Eleanor Waldorf Rose; Ella Rae Peck as Charlotte "Lola" Rhodes

Episode chronology
← Previous "G.G."	Next → "Crazy, Cupid, Love"
- Gossip Girl season 5

"The Backup Dan" is the fourteenth episode of the fifth season of the American television teen drama, Gossip Girl and the show's 101st episode overall. The episode was written by Matt Whitney and directed by David Warren. It premiered on The CW in the United States on February 6, 2012.

The episode received mixed reviews, with critics praising the scenes between Penn Badgley's Dan Humphrey and Leighton Meester's Blair Waldorf as entertaining but noting the uncomfortable pattern of Blair continuing to be bought and sold by her love interests.

The episode was viewed by 1.25 million people and earned a 0.6/2 Nielsen rating/share in the 18–49 demographic.

== Plot ==
The wedding reception of Blair (Leighton Meester) and Prince Louis (Hugo Becker) continues from the previous episode. Serena (Blake Lively), Chuck (Ed Westwick), Nate (Chace Crawford) and Lola (Ella Rae Peck) search for Blair who has disappeared from the reception. The gang gets a tip that Blair is at the Empire Hotel but when they arrive, they find Georgina (Michelle Trachtenberg) instead.

Meanwhile, Dan (Penn Badgley) drives Blair to JFK so she can try to fly to the Dominican Republic, where Blair believes it will be possible to divorce Louis without his consent, just like Elizabeth Taylor. Blair reveals she wants a divorce because Louis revealed himself to be a different person after Gossip Girl posted the video of Blair professing her love to Chuck. Still in her wedding dress, Blair starts to attract attention from passersby in the airport so she claims she and Dan are royal decoys.

Serena calls Dan to ask if he knows where Blair is. Dan lies and tells her Blair left the reception with Louis. Blair tries to buy a ticket to the Dominican Republic but realizes she does not have her passport. She asks Dorota (Zuzanna Szadkowski) to bring the passport to the airport. Louis gives a press conference asking for the public's help finding Blair so she and Dan decide to wait for Dorota at a hotel.

Georgina leaves the Empire and intercepts Dorota in Blair's apartment to prevents her from delivering Blair's passport. Serena and Chuck arrive, free Dorota, and take Blair's passport to the hotel.

At the same time at the Waldorf apartment, Princess Sophie (Joanne Whalley) tries to get Eleanor (Margaret Colin) to tell her where Blair is by reminding her of the dowry in the prenuptial agreement.

Back at the Empire, Nate and Lola talk.

At the airport hotel, Serena and Chuck find Dan and Blair. Georgina, having followed Serena and Chuck from Blair's apartment, arrives and snaps a photo of the four. Surprised, Serena drops her bag, revealing the camera with the video of Blair professing her love to Chuck. Serena confesses she is the one who sent the video in to Gossip Girl to help Blair and Chuck be together.

Chuck offers to charter a plane to the Dominican Republic for Blair but Sophie arrives. She reminds Blair that her family will be responsible for paying her dowry if she defaults on her marriage to Louis. In order to afford the dowry, Eleanor will likely have to sell her company. Chuck offers to pay the dowry but Blair refuses.

In the hotel bar, Serena is angry with Dan for not telling her the truth about where Blair was. Serena is also angry that Dan chose to help Blair after she told him how she felt about him at the reception.

Blair finds Dan at the bar and apologizes for how she has treated him. She thanks him for helping her escape the reception and for caring about her as a friend. Blair returns to her apartment to leave on her honeymoon with Louis.

Georgina returns home and discusses the evening's events with Philip, revealing that she has only been posting as Gossip Girl since it was abandoned, confirming she is not the real Gossip Girl.

Chuck and Serena see the Gossip Girl blast about Blair leaving on her honeymoon with Louis. Serena reveals she only admitted to sending in the video of Blair professing her love to Chuck to Gossip Girl to cover for Chuck sending it in so Chuck and Blair could be together. Chuck is adamant he did not send the video and the scene cuts to Dan intently watching Blair and Louis leave, implying it was Dan who sent the video.

== Production ==
Music featured in the episode included Future This by The Big Pink, Like a Virgin by Madonna, New York City by In Waves, Try by JoAnna James, Wait by M83, and War by The Temporary Thing.

== Reception ==
=== Ratings ===
"The Backup Dan" was broadcast on February 6, 2012 in the United States on The CW. The episode was watched by 1.25 million people and earned a 0.6/2 Nielsen rating/share in the adults among the 18–49 demographic, a 10% decrease from the previous episode's season high.

=== Critical reception ===
The episode received mixed reviews from critics. Huffington Post's Laura Prudom thought the episode was not as successful as the previous one, calling the story "choppy and strangely paced" as the action jumped around between characters in different locations. She also expressed disappointment with the writers building another storyline where Blair is essentially bought by a love interest, referring to Chuck exchanging Blair for a hotel and now Louis exchanging a year of marriage for waiving the dowry. Steve Marsi at TVFanatic praised the "classic" scenes between Dan and Blair at the airport, calling them "highly entertaining" and noting how it was clear Penn Badgley and Leighton Meester enjoyed portraying Dan and Blair's relationship.
