= Gossip Girl season 5 =

Gossip Girl
- Season 5
- DVD cover art
- Showrunner: Joshua Safran
- Starring: Blake Lively; Leighton Meester; Penn Badgley; Chace Crawford; Ed Westwick; Kaylee DeFer; Kelly Rutherford; Matthew Settle
- No. of episodes: 24

Release
- Original network: The CW
- Original release: September 26, 2011 – May 14, 2012

Season chronology
- ← Previous; Season 4 Next → Season 6

The fifth season of the American teen drama television series Gossip Girl premiered on The CW on September 26, 2011, and concluded on May 14, 2012, consisting of 24 episodes. Based on the novel series, that consists of twelve titles, including one prequel, of the same name by Cecily von Ziegesar, the series was developed for television by Josh Schwartz and Stephanie Savage. The CW officially renewed the series for a fifth season on April 26, 2011.

== Synopsis ==
The season premiere (Yes, Then Zero) was set in Los Angeles, California, where Serena has a job on a film set. Nate Archibald begins an affair with Diana Payne, an older woman with many secrets, and begins working at The New York Spectator. Still posing as Charlie Rhodes, Ivy Dickens also begins working there. Dan Humphrey's first book, Inside, is published. Blair Waldorf receives life-changing news and is still stuck in the love triangle between Chuck Bass and Louis Grimaldi, and begins seeking comfort from the unlikeliest of people, Dan Humphrey. Serena van der Woodsen's family have multiple bombshells uncovered after one of their own dies. Charlie's real identity is revealed to everyone, as is who put her up to it and why. Serena and Nate make it their mission to uncover who is behind Gossip Girl once and for all. Everyone is rocked by the return of Bart Bass to the Upper East Side. Serena and Blair face problems in their friendship because Blair is dating Dan who Serena still loves.

== Cast and characters ==
It was later announced that Taylor Momsen, who played Jenny Humphrey since the pilot, and Jessica Szohr, who joined the series as Vanessa Abrams in season one, would not be returning for the fifth season as regulars. Kaylee DeFer was upgraded to a series regular status in her roles as Serena's cousin, Charlie Rhodes, and aspiring actress/con artist Ivy Dickens. Hugo Becker also reprises his role as Blair's love interest, Prince Louis Grimaldi of Monaco. With the confirmation of the 2011–12 schedule, The CW announced that Gossip Girl would be returning to Mondays at 8:00pm as a lead-in to Hart of Dixie.

=== Main ===
- Blake Lively as Serena van der Woodsen
- Leighton Meester as Blair Waldorf
- Penn Badgley as Dan Humphrey
- Chace Crawford as Nate Archibald
- Ed Westwick as Chuck Bass
- Kaylee DeFer as Ivy Dickens
- Kelly Rutherford as Lily van der Woodsen
- Matthew Settle as Rufus Humphrey
- Kristen Bell as the voice of Gossip Girl (uncredited)

=== Recurring ===
- Hugo Becker as Prince Louis Grimaldi
- Margaret Colin as Eleanor Waldorf
- Elizabeth Hurley as Diana Payne
- Michael Michele as Jane Bettinger
- Brian J. Smith as Max Harding
- Zuzanna Szadkowski as Dorota Kishlovsky
- Joanne Whalley as Princess Sophie Grimaldi
- Roxane Mesquida as Princess Beatrice Grimaldi
- Sheila Kelley as Carol Rhodes
- Marina Squerciati as Alessandra Steele
- Wallace Shawn as Cyrus Rose
- Alice Callahan as Jessica Leitenberg
- Amanda Setton as Penelope Shafai
- Nan Zhang as Kati Farkas
- James Naughton as William van der Bilt
- Caroline Lagerfelt as CeCe Rhodes
- Aaron Tveit as Tripp van der Bilt III
- Ella Rae Peck as Lola Rhodes
- Michelle Trachtenberg as Georgina Sparks
- William Baldwin as William van der Woodsen
- Aaron Schwartz as Vanya
- Desmond Harrington as Jack Bass
- Robert John Burke as Bart Bass

=== Guest ===
- Zoë Bell as Ally
- David Patrick Kelly as Noah Shapiro
- John Shea as Harold Waldorf
- St. Vincent as herself

== Episodes ==
No. overall	No. in season	Title	Directed by	Written by	Original release date	U.S. viewers (millions)
88	1	"Yes, Then Zero"	Mark Piznarski	Joshua Safran	September 26, 2011	1.37
Serena finds a job as a production assistant while spending her summer in L.A, but her work is quickly jeopardized when she tries to impress her new employer in order to be promoted. Nate and Chuck also arrive in Los Angeles, where Nate meets an older woman and Chuck starts making increasingly reckless moves. Meanwhile, after spending the summer in Monaco, Blair returns to New York to hasten the preparation of her wedding, while concealing a secret that could wreck it all. Meanwhile, Dan seeks Louis' help in preventing the publication of a revealing article on Blair written in the spring. Title reference: The 1987 film Less than Zero.
89	2	"Beauty and the Feast"	Mark Piznarski	Sara Goodman	October 3, 2011	1.34
Blair tries to conceal the news of her recent pregnancy from Louis as the arrival of her future sister-in-law Beatrice (Roxane Mesquida) nears. Nate reconnects with the mysterious Diana Payne (Elizabeth Hurley), a woman whom he had a fling with in Los Angeles who offers him a job opportunity to work at her newspaper, The New York Spectator. Meanwhile, Dan is desperately in need of help from Chuck to stop his novel from being published, but finds out that Chuck is hiding a secret. Ivy, still in character as Charlie, tries to hide her real identity from an unsuspecting Serena but her plans affects her life in Los Angeles with her unsuspecting boyfriend Max. Blair's plan does not go accordingly since Beatrice overhears her tell Dan that she is pregnant, not bulimic. Title reference: The 1991 film Beauty and the Beast.
90	3	"The Jewel of Denial"	Larry Shaw	Amanda Lasher	October 10, 2011	1.27
Serena and Charlie return to New York. Worrying that her identity will be revealed, Ivy decides to start forging her own path by becoming a part of New York's social scene as Charlie. Meanwhile, Dan learns that his former mentor, Noah Shapiro, is responsible for publishing his novel. After his attempts at stopping Noah fail, Dan soon ends up in the spotlight. Chuck tries to break through his emotional block. Unknowingly, Nate is persuaded by the ruthless maneater Diana to cross moral lines while interviewing a couple at the Jenny Packham fashion show. Lily is finally released from house arrest and attends the fashion show with Rufus, despite the fact that her social life is in shambles. After learning that Ivy stole some of Charlie's trust fund money for herself, Carol Rhodes tracks down Ivy to New York where Ivy threatens to reveal their scam, as well as implicate Serena and the entire Van Der Woodsen family, if Carol does not back away. Elsewhere, a very reluctant Blair decides she does not want to learn who the father of her unborn child is, but is later seen telling Chuck that she is pregnant with Louis' baby, but adds "Part of me wished it was yours". He is both amazed and hurt. When Blair tells Louis that she is pregnant, he is ecstatic, but at the end Blair is seen hiding the paternity test results in a drawer. Also, Nate finds Ivy's missing cell phone with her text messages from her boyfriend Max, but does not make the connection that Ivy and Charlie are one and the same. Title reference: The 1985 film The Jewel of the Nile.
91	4	"Memoirs of an Invisible Dan"	Tate Donovan	Amy B. Harris	October 17, 2011	1.16
Dan is about to be announced as author of Inside so he gives copies of the book to Blair, Serena, Nate, Chuck, and Rufus, hoping they will be supportive at his upcoming book party. In the book, Dan described Serena as the "old Serena": drinking, dating teachers, being shallow, partying, and reckless. Nate does not receive a character description, but is merged with Eric (a younger, gay character with political relatives). Chuck is described as being lonely, cynical and without any friends or family. The book talks about Blair and Dan having sex, and when Louis reads it he says he cannot trust Blair anymore. Blair is afraid she will have to raise the baby on her own if he leaves her. In the end, Louis apologizes for his behavior and agrees to trust Blair. Even Rufus becomes angry and alienated with Dan when he says he had never regretted leaving the music industry to have a family, until upon reading the book, which portrays him as marrying Lily just for money. Meanwhile, Diana makes the connection of Ivy and Charlie being the same person and forces Charlie to work for her at The Spectator. Also, Serena's boss tells her to get the film rights for Inside and that she has only one week, forcing Serena to choose between Dan and her career. Title reference: The 1992 film Memoirs of an Invisible Man.
92	5	"The Fasting and the Furious"	Joe Lazarov	Peter Elkoff	October 24, 2011	1.36
Louis' mother Princess Sophie and his sister Beatrice pay another visit to New York where Blair announces her pregnancy to everyone. While her stepfather and mother, Cyrus and Eleanor, decide to throw a Yom Kippur dinner party to celebrate, Sophie and Beatrice try to get Blair to accept a series of conditions following the marriage. Blair naturally refuses, and Louis must choose between standing beside Blair or his mother. Meanwhile, Serena tries to get back into Dan's good graces after her boss tells her to ask Dan to gain the movie rights to his book. Charlie asks Nate for help after Diana gives her a difficult assignment to find more dirt on the Van der Woodsen family kept in the family safe. As Rufus and Lily continue to avoid talking with Dan over his book, Chuck connects with an attractive therapist who rebuffs his advances and seems to see right through his character for who he really is. Title reference: The 2001 film The Fast and the Furious.
93	6	"I Am Number Nine"	Andy Wolk	Jake Coburn	November 7, 2011	1.26
Blair tries out three of her former minions to see if they are worthy to be her bridesmaids, and Charlie willingly teams up with the group in order to seek out a story, where she proves herself to be more than a match for the mean girls. Nate becomes frustrated that Diana refuses to publicly speak about their romance. Nate tries to make Diana jealous by asking Charlie to accompany him to Diana's party celebrating the opening of her new gossip blog at The Spectator. Meanwhile, Serena is forced by her boss, Jane, to secure the screenwriting rights for Dan's book, who quickly realizes that Jane wants someone else to write the screenplay in order to make the movie more marketable. Also, Chuck discovers that his therapist, Dr. Eliza Barnes, has been recruited by Louis in order to dissuade Chuck from pursuing Blair any further. Title reference: The 2011 film I Am Number Four.
94	7	"The Big Sleep No More"	Vince Misiano	Dan Steele	November 14, 2011	1.24
Several of the group attend a performance of Punchdrunk's provocative theater experience, "Sleep No More", which involves masks, anonymity and some surprising romantic twists by the end of the evening. Dorota follows Blair to the performance to stop her from trying to prove that Chuck's attempts to reform himself into a better man are a scam. Meanwhile, Diana sets her sights to snag Serena a job at The Spectator as part of her twisted quest to ruin Gossip Girl's website. Charlie/Ivy's ex-boyfriend, Max, arrives in town to look for her, and ends up as Serena's date to the performance. Diana sets about manipulating Max, Serena, Charlie, and Nate, hoping to cause a major confrontation for her own deranged enjoyment. Elsewhere, Dan sets out on his book tour, but Rufus and Lily discover that he is not exactly having the experience that he claims. At the end, more shocking twists are revealed as the evil Diana and Nate's crooked grandfather, William van der Bilt, are revealed to have been working together to orchestrate Nate's employment with Diana as part of sinister grand plan for Nate, while Max, sent away by Diana on a ruse, accidentally discovers Ivy's double life of impersonating Serena's cousin Charlie. Title reference: The 1946 film The Big Sleep and the 2011 theatrical production Sleep No More.
95	8	"All the Pretty Sources"	Cherie Nowlan	Austin Winsberg	November 21, 2011	1.35
Serena is hard at work planning a dream bridal shower for Blair, but it is no surprise that Serena has to plant some false information about the shower in order to keep Blair from finding out all the details. Meanwhile, Chuck and Dan decide to spend the day together to distract themselves from the fact that they did not make the invite list for Blair's shower. Nate and Serena find a silver bullet in Diana's war against Gossip Girl when they uncover a list of all of Gossip Girl's contacts, but struggle about whether to use it or not. When the list is leaked anyway, Nate and Serena accuse each other. Nate also accuses Diana, but Blair finds out that the culprit is Louis. Elsewhere, Max confronts Ivy about her double life of impersonating Charlie. Max quickly sees through Ivy's lies and, instead of informing Lily or Serena or the authorities with what he knows, he blackmails Ivy for a large sum of money. Also, William van der Bilt forces Diana to quit as editor-in-chief of The Spectator so that Nate can take her place. Chuck tells Dan that he (Dan) is in love with Blair. The episode ends with Blair visiting Chuck at the Empire after she learns from Serena that Chuck really has changed. Title reference: The 2000 film All the Pretty Horses.
96	9	"Rhodes to Perdition"	Andrew McCarthy	Natalie Krinsky	November 28, 2011	1.32
CeCe Rhodes arrives back in New York where Lily and Serena are planning to throw her a Studio 54 party in her honor. Serena continues dating Max who begins blackmailing Charlie. Meanwhile, Dan meets with his publicist Alessandra where they create rival "Dan fan" and "Dan hater" accounts on Twitter in order to create online buzz for his book. Blair attempts to figure out how to make Louis more like the "new" Chuck by spending the day with Chuck. She accompanies him to therapy and demands to know how he has improved himself only to find out that he has let her go. Upset, she runs home and later reveals to Chuck that she is afraid that she is the one that brings the dark side out in him and Louis. Chuck assures her that she is "the lightest thing that ever came into my life" and tells her he let her go because she asked him to. He just wants her to be happy. Also, as Nate becomes the new boss of The Spectator, one of his employees finds out that his cousin Tripp's wife, Maureen, might be having an affair. He soon figures out, however, that Maureen is faking an affair in order to create a sympathetic image for Tripp in the public eye before the upcoming election. Serena learns the truth about Ivy and Max and breaks up with him. Carol Rhodes visits to help find a cover story to get "Charlie" her trust fund and to help keep her there where she is loved. In the final confrontation, everyone believes Ivy's false story that she really is Charlie and pretended to be Ivy when she was with Max, even though he calls her a liar and says otherwise. Ivy also finds out that CeCe is sick, but keeps it a secret. The episode ends with Max reaffirming his threats to Ivy to expose her scam, Chuck telling Nate that he still loves Blair, and Blair looking despondent in her bedroom, refusing to talking to Louis who is out of the country. Title reference: The 2002 film Road to Perdition.
97	10	"Riding in Town Cars with Boys"	Vince Misiano	Amanda Lasher	December 5, 2011	1.28
Serena and Lily prepare Charlie for her first debutante ball to welcome her into New York high society, but the vindictive Max is determined to reveal Charlie/Ivy's secret by any means necessary. Meanwhile, Blair must choose where she stands with both Louis and Chuck as she hides out at the Humphrey loft in Brooklyn from the press. Dan realizes that it is time to tell Blair the truth about his feelings for her. Louis returns to New York where he meets with Serena and confides in her about his fears about his future with Blair. Nate learns that his grandfather, William van der Bilt, owns the majority of stock shares at The Spectator and he influenced Diana to hire him. William invites Nate to an upstate retreat, but Nate's cousin, Tripp, has been excluded. After Dan sacrifices his own love for Blair for her happiness, Chuck and Blair are hurried into a car from Charlie's debutante ball. Their car is tailed by vicious paparazzi (Charlie sent a blast to Gossip Girl and tipped them off in order to keep them away from her) who cause them to crash, leaving Chuck fighting for his life and the pregnant Blair fighting to keep her baby. After Max's pleas to both Serena and Nate about Charlie's real identity fall on deaf ears, he runs into Tripp van der Bilt, whom he tells Ivy’s story to. Charlie calls Carol Rhodes to tell her that she is leaving New York City after she tells Rufus that she is a fraud. Also, Diana is called by Jack Bass and informed about Chuck and Blair's car accident; she is somehow involved. Title reference: The 2001 film Riding in Cars with Boys.
98	11	"The End of the Affair?"	Michael Grossman	Sara Goodman	January 16, 2012	1.29
Through a series of emotional flashbacks, Blair reveals to Serena what really happened in the aftermath of her car crash with Chuck. Dan tries to help Blair recover, while both Chuck and Louis mistake their bonding as an affair. Meanwhile, Nate discovers information about the accident that suggests possible foul play. Having successfully shut down Gossip Girl's website, Serena is reluctant to become the next Gossip Girl as her work at The Spectator takes off. Elsewhere, Lily is worried by Charlie's long absence and decides to hire a private detective to track her down despite Rufus' objections. Vera Wang makes a cameo as herself at Blair's dress fitting. Title reference: The 1999 film of the same name.
99	12	"Father and the Bride"	Amy Heckerling	Peter Elkoff	January 23, 2012	1.11
Blair decides to throw herself a bachelorette party, but shady enemies who include Beatrice (Roxane Mesquida) and her co-conspirator cousin Father Cavette, scheme to ruin and humiliate Blair, with an unknowing Chuck as their patsy, in order to prevent Blair's upcoming marriage by any means necessary. Meanwhile, Nate, with the distant assistance of Gossip Girl, finally discovers that Tripp was responsible for the car accident that hurt Blair and Chuck and he contacts William van der Bilt for help to expose Tripp's scheme. Also, Serena and Dan continue their fake relationship to protect Blair while Dan becomes uncertain about writing again. Title reference: The 1991 film Father of the Bride.
100	13	"G.G."	Mark Piznarski	Joshua Safran	January 30, 2012	1.39
In the 100th episode, Blair's wedding day finally arrives, along with a vengeful Georgina Sparks and her co-conspirator husband who are determined to ruin Blair's wedding by any means necessary. Meanwhile, Serena decides that she has to tell Dan how she feels while Nate unknowingly meets the real Charlie Rhodes working as a waitress at the reception. Elsewhere, Chuck struggles with deciding whether or not to make a final grand gesture to show Blair how he feels until Blair's mother, Eleanor, approaches him to persuade him to stop the wedding. Blair's estranged father Harold and her stepfather Cyrus try to get Blair to choose one of them to escort her down the aisle, while Louis' mother, Sophia, again tries to tell Louis that Blair is not, and never will be, trustworthy. During the wedding, Gossip Girl leaks a video which shows Blair confessing her love for Chuck. However, the interrupted wedding continues and Blair is officially declared the Princess of Monaco. However, at the reception, Louis reveals to Blair that the wedding stands is just for show and their love does not exist anymore, to which Blair reacts in distress and runs away with Dan. The identity of Gossip Girl's successor is revealed at the end of the episode. Title reference: The 1958 film Gigi.
101	14	"The Backup Dan"	David Warren	Matt Whitney	February 6, 2012	1.25
Following the wedding, Blair tries to leave for the Dominican Republic, with the help of Dan, to get a divorce from Louis without his consent due to a loophole in the Dominican Republic's law. However, she realizes that she forgot her passport and so asks Dorota for help. Serena, Chuck, and Nate reluctantly team up with Georgina to find Blair, until Georgina gets a tip from one of her sources and leaves. Georgina, as Gossip Girl, then reveals Blair’s location to Louis and Sophia. Nate, Serena, and Chuck eventually find Blair in a hotel room with Dan. Sophia finds Blair and threatens to sell Eleanor's company if Blair chooses not to return, on which Blair reluctantly decides to go back. Elsewhere, Nate has another meeting with the real Charlie Rhodes, who goes by the name of Lola. At the end, it is revealed that neither Chuck nor Serena, who takes the blame, leaked the video of Blair confessing her love for Chuck, and it is implied instead that Dan is the one who sent it in to Gossip Girl. It is revealed that Georgina is simply filling in for Gossip Girl ever since she abandoned the blog after Chuck and Blair's car accident. Title reference: The 2010 film The Back-up Plan.
102	15	"Crazy, Cupid, Love"	Matt Penn	Austin Winsberg	February 13, 2012	1.13
It is Valentine's Day and Blair cannot resist acting as Cupid as she tries to get Serena and Dan back together. Georgina is intent on stirring up more trouble since taking over Gossip Girl's website. With the help of a group of informants, Georgina decides to crash Nate's Valentine's Day party which is being held at the Empire Hotel, while Chuck does not feel in the holiday spirit and falls into his old habits. Meanwhile, Ivy returns to New York for a quick visit, but has a run-in with the real Charlie Rhodes, whom Nate is still pining for. Serena is shocked by something she witnesses at the party. Georgina figures out that Dan was the one who leaked the video of Blair confessing her love for Chuck at her wedding, but keeps silent when Dan discovers her own secret of being Gossip Girl. Charlie discovers that Ivy, whom she used to know from acting school, has been impersonating her but remains quiet as she sets out to investigate her. Ivy is also revealed to have spent the last three months hiding out in the Hamptons where she keeps a bedside vigil at a local hospice for a terminally sick CeCe Rhodes. Title reference: The 2011 film Crazy, Stupid, Love.
103	16	"Cross Rhodes"	John Terlesky	Amy B. Harris	February 20, 2012	1.00
Dan feels honored when he learns that Upright Citizen’s Brigade theater troupe is performing excerpts from his book, Inside. Meanwhile, Blair tries to prove Serena's suspicions about her feelings for Dan are wrong, in order to save their relationship. A jealous and vindictive Chuck maliciously plots to sabotage Dan's writing career. On her way out of town, Ivy Dickens ends up on a collision course with the Van der Woodsens as she continues to look after the cancer-stricken CeCe. Charlie/Lola continues to investigate Ivy's origins. Carol Rhodes also arrives back in New York after learning from Lily and Serena about Cece's medical turn for the worse. At the hospital, Ivy and Charlie run into each other once again. Charlie finally reveals to the whole Van der Woodsen family that Ivy (whom they still know as Charlie) is an impostor. Carol, unable to lie any more, tells the truth about Ivy and their scheme. Blair admits to her feelings for Dan. At the end of the episode CeCe dies. Title reference: The 1986 film Crossroads.
104	17	"The Princess Dowry"	Andrew McCarthy	Jake Coburn	February 27, 2012	1.11
Blair thinks her stepfather may have found a potential loophole in her prenuptial agreement that would allow her to escape her marriage to Louis. CeCe Rhodes, before her death, arranged for a secret Irish-themed wake to take place at Van der Woodsen penthouse. Georgina Sparks decides to leave her post at Gossip Girl to her loyal but incompetent husband, Phil, and crash the wake to stir up more trouble. Chuck learns that Dan was the one who sent the video of him and Blair at her wedding ceremony and sends a blast to Gossip Girl. However, Phil inadvertently leaves Chuck's name in the blast. William Van der Woodsen (William Baldwin) returns to the Upper East Side for the wake, as he is the executor of CeCe's estate. Ivy Dickens is announced as CeCe's heir and it is revealed that CeCe was aware the whole time of Ivy's real identity. Ivy evicts both Lily and Rufus from the Van der Woodsen penthouse. Carol Rhodes also reveals the identity of Charlie's father as William Van der Woodsen. The real Charlie 'Lola' Rhodes continues her affair with Nate but has little interest in getting to know her family until Georgina suggests to her there may be another reason why her mother hid her from them. Blair's personal accountant, Estée, is in love with Louis, and she convinces Blair to agree to having her marriage annulled as long as she does not say a word to the media, including Gossip Girl. However, this is all a ruse perpetrated by Georgina herself, who sends a photo of Blair and Dan kissing to Gossip Girl and the Waldorfs are once again threatened with responsibility of paying the dowry and declaring bankruptcy. Blair tells Chuck that she will always love him but is not in love with him anymore. Georgina no longer wants to act as Gossip Girl after revealing to everyone that she has been filling in for the real Gossip Girl. She sends her computer to Serena and leaves for Monaco to help annul Blair's marriage, in exchange for a favor down the road. Blair tells Dan that he is the one who has her heart and they begin a relationship. Title reference: The 2001 film The Princess Diaries.
105	18	"Con Heir"	Joe Lazarov	Annemarie Navar-Gill	April 2, 2012	0.97
Chuck invites his uncle, Jack, back to New York to thank him for saving his life in the car accident by donating blood, but starts to doubt Jack's story when Chuck investigates and learns that Jack was recently diagnosed positive with Hepatitis C, and a test on Chuck for hepatitis turns out to be negative. Meanwhile, Blair and Dan attempt to consummate their new relationship, but unexpected roadblocks get in their way. Serena takes over the role of Gossip Girl after receiving Georgina's package, but learns that the job is trickier than she thought. Elsewhere, Ivy believes she has found an ally in William in her quest to be accepted into high society on the Upper East Side. Lily tries to adjust to living in Brooklyn at the Humphrey loft with Rufus until the war against Ivy is settled. Lola decides to help her family, seeing as they are all she has left. Also, Nate is hopeful that a new investor will save The Spectator. The episode concludes with the real Gossip Girl ready to resume her post, and requesting that Serena give the site back. Chuck discovers that it is his mother who donated the blood. Title reference: The 1997 film Con Air.
106	19	"It Girl, Interrupted"	Omar Madha	Amanda Lasher	April 9, 2012	0.98
Serena is determined to turn Lola into the next "it-girl" of the Upper East Side, starting with trying to persuade Lola to model at a Kiki de Montparnasse lingerie show. Meanwhile, Chuck reaches out to Blair for advice about his past but is rejected as she believes he has a hidden agenda. Diana Payne's return to The Spectator starts a power struggle with Nate for control, while Lola reacts with jealousy; but everything is not what it appears. It is discovered that Chuck paid Blair's dowry to get rid of Louis' family. Also, Rufus and Lily have a falling out after Lily goes behind Rufus' back to play a simple scheme to remove Ivy from their penthouse. Title reference: The 1999 film Girl, Interrupted.
107	20	"Salon of the Dead"	Norman Buckley	Natalie Krinsky	April 16, 2012	1.06
Blair and Dan throw a salon as a way of coming out as a couple, but drama caused by their friends derail the night. Lola finds out Serena is posing as Gossip Girl but does not tell Nate, knowing he would be hurt by the revelation. Lily cuts off Rufus' debit card after she finds out he has been paying for a hotel for Ivy. It is revealed at the end that Diana is really Chuck's mother: she was too young to raise a baby and gave him to Elizabeth to look after. Title reference: The 2004 film Shaun of the Dead.
108	21	"Despicable B"	David Warren	Austin Winsberg	April 23, 2012	0.99
Blair feels like her Upper East Side status might be slipping away and devises a plan to assure that does not happen by upstaging Dan at a publishers’ gathering. Meanwhile, Lily throws a family gathering including William, Carol, and Lola in an attempt to prove the van der Woodsen family is as united as ever, but Lily has an ulterior motive. Finally, Nate digs into Diana's past and is surprised by what he discovers. Title reference: The 2010 film Despicable Me.
109	22	"Raiders of the Lost Art"	Bart Wenrich	Jake Coburn	April 30, 2012	1.02
Chuck, Nate, Blair, Serena, and Lola team up to uncover what they think is an explosive secret between Diana and Jack. Meanwhile, Dan is offered a prestigious fellowship in Rome for the summer, but turns it down for his relationship with Blair. Dan tells Blair he loves her, but she does not say it back. Nate and Lola team up with Gossip Girl to take back the site from Serena, leaving her hopeless. Diana is seen to be running a high class brothel service. At the end of the episode Chuck finds out his father Bart Bass is still alive. Title reference: The 1981 film Raiders of the Lost Ark.
110	23	"The Fugitives"	Andy Wolk	Matt Whitney	May 7, 2012	0.83
Blair enlists Serena to be her stand-in at an important meeting when Blair finds herself needing to be in two places at the same time as Dan seeks to meet with a college rep from Italy for his overseas summer stay in Italy. Meanwhile, Ivy and Lola team up to help Chuck with a personal vendetta against an old enemy of Bart Bass. Also, Nate makes a decision about the future with Diana. Title reference: The 1993 film The Fugitive.
111	24	"The Return of the Ring"	J. Miller Tobin	Sara Goodman	May 14, 2012	1.14
When Gossip Girl begins to upload excerpts from Blair's diary, her love life begins to unravel, causing her to choose between Dan and Chuck. Serena is banished from the Waldorf apartment for her part in the reveal of Blair's diary. She then retaliates by trying to seduce Dan with the help of Blair's minions. Nate asks Lola to move in with him, but she turns him down when she tells him that her acting group is going on tour. At the Shephard divorce party, Serena and Dan have sex, but when Dan learns she videotaped their encounter just to hurt Blair, he furiously leaves. Elsewhere, Lily chooses to annul her marriage to Rufus, since her marriage to Bart is still valid. Lola receives her share of the van der Woodsen estate from her biological father, William, and also learns that Lily intentionally sabotaged Carol's defense in court to keep her imprisoned as well as destroyed Ivy's case in order to keep Cece's wealth all for herself. Blair accepts an offer from her mother to take over her fashion company. Following a Bass Industries press conference, Blair chooses Chuck over Dan, but Chuck rebuffs her as he is preoccupied with his father's return as head of Bass Industries and he ousts Chuck to reclaim his former position as CEO. One week later, Lola hands over her inheritance share to Ivy, who in return promises to help her bring down their common enemy: Lily. Lola leaves town to go on tour with her acting troupe, while Ivy returns to Florida to plot her revenge against Lily. The disgraced Serena leaves town and reverts to her old self by taking drugs and sleeping with her dealer, while the alienated Dan leaves for Rome and prepares to write another tell-all book about the Upper East Side with the help of Georgina. Nate receives CCTV footage from Diana Payne of the real Gossip Girl (a hooded masked figure) stealing Serena's laptop on the night of Bart's return. While in Monte Carlo, Blair goes to a casino where Chuck and Jack are scheming to bring down Bart Bass and tells Chuck it is now her turn to fight for him. Title reference: The 2003 film The Lord of the Rings: The Return of the King.

== Production ==
The CW officially renewed the series for a fifth season on April 26, 2011.

On May 19, 2011, with the reveal of The CW's 2011–12 television schedule, Gossip Girl stayed on Monday night and moved to the 8:00 pm Eastern/7:00 pm Central timeslot as a lead-in to Hart of Dixie, which is produced by Gossip Girl's executive producers Josh Schwartz and Stephanie Savage. The fifth season premiered on Monday, September 26, 2011.

Filming for the season began on July 7, 2011. On August 3, 2011, The CW ordered two additional episodes for the fifth season, which will now total at 24. Executive producer Joshua Safran announced that he would be "pulling out all the stops" to make the 100th episode of the show special, which is expected to air in January. On the date of the season premiere, the show used footage of the New York cityscape that showed the World Trade Center before the September 11 attacks. Footage containing the World Trade Center have been omitted by films and TV shows such as Sex and the City and The Sopranos to honor individuals who died in the attacks. The network has not responded to criticism regarding the usage of the footage.

Despite dwindling ratings, series executives were confident the show will be renewed for a sixth season. Head of Warner Bros. Television, Peter Roth was also confident that the show will return, stating, "I can't really say at this point, but I would hope and expect that there would be at least another year—if not years—to come." Later on, executive producer Stephanie Savage hinted that a sixth and final season was likely. "We're not writing a series finale this year," said Savage. She added "I checked in with the bosses to make sure we're not shooting ourselves in the foot" and said the cast contracts run out at the end of the next season so "that feels like probably an organic ending point".

St. Vincent performed "Cruel" and "Cheerleader" from her Strange Mercy album during the Valentine's Day episode.

=== Cast ===
Diana's entrance on the Upper East Side will change the lives of all our characters—including and especially, Gossip Girl herself.

— Stephanie Savage and Joshua Safran on Liz Hurley's introduction

Blake Lively, Leighton Meester, Penn Badgley, Chace Crawford, and Ed Westwick all returned as series regulars. Kaylee DeFer was upgraded to series regular status, while Taylor Momsen and Jessica Szohr exited the show, though they were both invited back as guest stars. Kelly Rutherford and Matthew Settle also returned as regulars.

On April 6, 2011, 10 Things I Hate About You star Ethan Peck landed a guest-starring role on the show. Peck made his debut in the fourth season finale and was in talks with producers for a recurring role for the fifth season. Peck would later film his scenes with Lively for the season premiere. French actress and model Roxane Mesquida was cast as Beatrice, Louis' sister and Blair's nemesis in a recurring role for the fifth season. Actress Elizabeth Hurley was cast as media mogul Diana Payne and starred in a multi-episode arc, with the character being described as "a sexy, smart, self-made media mogul and an all-around force to be reckoned with." Former Lost actor Marc Menard joined the cast in the role of Father Cavalia, a handsome priest from Monaco who will preside over Blair's wedding.

Brian J. Smith, known for his role on Stargate Universe, had been cast as a love interest for Serena while she is in Los Angeles and would appearing on the show as Max, an aspiring chef. Connor Paolo, who went on to become a regular on ABC's Revenge, did not return to the show as Eric van der Woodsen stating, "I'm done. You should never go back in life. Only forward." In an interview with Elle magazine on August 16, 2011, Momsen stated that she had quit the series to focus fully on her music career. Hollywood stuntwoman Zoë Bell was slated to appear on the show and made her debut in the season premiere. New York magazine noted the appearance of American novelist Jay McInerney, who reprised his role as writer Jeremiah Harris. Aaron Tveit, who previously portrayed Nate's cousin Tripp van der Bilt in the third season, returned to the show for a multi-episode arc.

Michelle Trachtenberg reprised her role as Georgina Sparks, who was last seen in the fourth season finale. She made her first appearance during the show's 100th episode. Also returning was William Baldwin as Serena and Eric's father, William van der Woodsen, for the season's 17th episode, which aired in February 2012. It was also reported that Desmond Harrington, who made a cameo appearance in the fall finale, would return as Chuck's uncle, Jack Bass. Also guest starring was One Life to Live's alum David A. Gregory as a friend of the real Charlie Rhodes (Ella Rae Peck). Cobra Starship's Gabe Saporta made a cameo in season 5 finale.

=== Plot ===
I feel like if you're a fan of the show and you've been watching from the beginning, you're going to feel rewarded. But I also feel like if you're tuning in after a long time, I think you may feel like you've missed a lot, but we really try to hit on everything that's happened since [early on]. I'm very proud of it.

— Joshua Safran on the series' 100th episode milestone

Season five opens in Los Angeles, where a vacationing Chuck and Nate decide to visit Serena, who is working on a film set. Back in New York, Blair learns that planning a royal wedding can be stressful, especially with a baby on the way, and Dan discovers the consequences of writing candidly about his closest friends. Also, the surprise return of cousin Charlie will threaten to destroy the van der Woodsen family.

Confused about Chuck's sudden change, Blair is determined to prove his behaviour is an act to win her back.

The series' 100th episode focused on Blair's wedding to prince Louis. "I think it's our biggest episode since the pilot", said executive producer Joshua Safran.

During this season, production knew who was going to be Gossip girl along, however, it got changed many times throughout the entire show. There are hints showing the different characters it could have been, but in the end, they decided on a completely different character that was originally planned on.

== Release ==
With the move to 8:00pm, The CW charged $50,304 for a 30-second advertising slot before the fifth season began airing.

=== Ratings ===
The show actually began with little recognition from the public. The season premiere was watched by 1.37 million viewers and received a 0.7 rating in the Adults 19–49 demo, down 0.3 compared to last season's premiere. Episode 23 hit a new series low, hitting for the fourth time a total viewership below the one-million-viewer mark, to 869,000 viewers and a 0.4 in the 18-49 demographic.

== DVD Release and more ==
Gossip Girl: The Complete Fifth Season
Set Details		Special Features	
24 Episodes; 5-Disc Set; English (Dolby Digital 5.1); French (Dolby Surround 2.0); Subtitles in English SDH, Spanish, French, Portuguese, Chinese and Indonesian; Runtime: 1010 minutes		Gossip Girl Turns 100!: The milestone event sparks a journey through the seasons, including interviews old and new, plus juicy dish on the Gossip Girl experience.; 5 Years of Iconic Style: Cast, crew and guests stars reveal their favorite fashion moments.; Gag Reel; Unaired Scenes	
Release Dates
Region 1	Region 2	Region 3	Region 4
September 25, 2012	September 3, 2012	October 12, 2012	September 12, 2012

Gossip Girl along with season 5 can be found on the following streaming services:

Netflix, Prime Video, Apple TV, Google Play, Max, and Tubi
