= Ivy Dickens =

Fictional character from Gossip Girl

- Gossip Girl character
- Kaylee DeFer as Ivy Dickens
- First appearance: "The Kids Stay in the Picture" (episode 4.18)
- Last appearance: "New York, I Love You XOXO" (episode 6.10)
- Portrayed by: Kaylee DeFer

In-universe information
- Full name: Ivy Dickens
- Aliases: former: Charlotte "Charlie" Rhodes
- Occupation: Actress; Beneficiary and socialite Con artist (former); Waitress (former)
- Family: as Charlie Rhodes: Carol Rhodes (mother); Lillian "Lily" Humphrey (maternal aunt); Rufus Humphrey (maternal uncle); Serena van der Woodsen (cousin); Eric van der Woodsen (cousin); Scott Rosson (cousin); Richard "Rick" Rhodes (maternal grandfather); Celia "CeCe" Rhodes (maternal grandmother; deceased)

Ivy Dickens (former alias: Charlotte "Charlie" Rhodes) is a fictional character who exclusively appears in the Gossip Girl television adaptation, portrayed by Kaylee DeFer. She first appears in "The Kids Stay in the Picture," initially appearing as Serena's estranged cousin, Charlie Rhodes, whom Serena takes under her wing and introduces to the Upper East Side. The fourth season finale "The Wrong Goodbye," reveals her true identity as Ivy Dickens, a struggling actress and con artist hired by Carol Rhodes to pose as her daughter in order to gain access to the real Charlie Rhodes' trust fund.

DeFer was promoted to series regular for the fifth season in light of cast members Taylor Momsen and Jessica Szohr's departure. She is the newest addition to the female cast of Gossip Girl villains, joining the likes of Georgina Sparks and Juliet Sharp.

== Television series ==
=== Casting and characterization ===
Introduced in the fourth season, DeFer was set to join the cast as Carol's daughter and Serena and Eric's cousin, Charlie Rhodes. DeFer's contract with the show also included the possibility of her becoming a series regular for the fifth season. She first auditioned for the role of Raina Thorpe. However, that role went to Tika Sumpter. DeFer was called back for the role of Charlie Rhodes, with the show's writers stating that they were writing something new for her character. DeFer had also previously worked with Gossip Girl executive producers, Stephanie Savage and Joe Lazarov as well as Penn Badgley in The Mountain.

Executive producer Joshua Safran later commented on her introduction and the perception that the character brought to the show. "We always like it when we have new people who are witnessing this world for the first time...For Charlie, it’s like trial by fire. From reading Gossip Girl for the first time or going to your first event, all that stuff we get to do over again in a new way."

Charlie's integration also made her a voice for the audience and critics of Gossip Girl. TV Fanatic warmly welcomed her character, stating that she "good-naturedly mocked the show and its often convoluted plot lines." DeFer would later reveal details behind her character's involvement in the fourth season finale, "As far as I know I’m just in the next five episodes until the season finale, and then I have no idea. But I really hope we get the opportunity to finish what Charlie started as I think it’s going to be a story-line that people will really want to follow." DeFer also states that Charlie is more relatable in comparison to other characters that have appeared in the show. "She is such a real person, not being from that life and what not..."

=== Season 4 ===
The character is first introduced in the second half of season four as Charlotte "Charlie" Rhodes, the estranged cousin of Serena and Eric van der Woodsen. Under the guise of Charlie Rhodes, she experiences the world of the Upper East Side, becoming particularly close with Dan Humphrey, though Dan puts a stop to the budding relationship because of his history with Serena. However, upon learning that Vanessa Abrams had intentionally sabotaged a meeting Charlie had organized, Dan allows himself to become closer to Charlie while severing his ties with Vanessa.

The two then begin an awkward relationship which concludes in the season's penultimate episode when Charlie, dressed like Serena, demands that Dan call her by Serena's name. It is later revealed that Charlie suffers from bi-polar disorder and she has stopped taking her medication. She leaves the Upper East Side and meets up with her mother, Carol. In the season's final moments, "Charlie Rhodes" is revealed to be Ivy Dickens, an aspiring actress that Carol hired to gain access to her daughter's trust fund. In her final scene she puts a napkin with Georgina's number in her bag which hints that the two will team up in the fifth season.

With regard to her involvement in the finale, DeFer discussed her character's involvement. "Charlie has a great deal to do with the season finale...but what I am allowed to say is that Charlie does mix it up with every character."

=== Season 5 ===
In between the fourth and fifth seasons, after returning to Miami, Ivy moved to Los Angeles with her boyfriend, Max, in order to become an actress. Ivy later runs into Serena at a restaurant that she and her boyfriend both work at and Serena, under the impression that Ivy is Charlie, offers to have Ivy move in with her. Ivy declines, looking for several ways to get out of the situation, but Serena convinces her to move back to New York with her.

After she and Serena return to New York, Charlie overhears that Carol is returning to New York and that Lily refuses to deceive her and she tells Serena that she is leaving. Serena, however, has seen this coming and asks her to return her tickets to a fashion show. When Charlie arrives, she discovers that Serena actually had her take her place as a model. After a conversation with Blair, she decides to stay. Her excitement does not last as she runs into Carol with Lily and Rufus, who had no idea that she had returned. After a confrontation with Carol, Ivy states that the family that Carol hates has been kinder to her than her own and that everything in New York 'sparkles' and she refuses to give that up and that the van der Woodsens would have a problem should it ever come out that Carol had hired her to impersonate Charlie in order to gain access to her trust fund. After this conversation, Carol tells Ivy that she is on her own and that Carol will not help Ivy any more should her real identity ever be discovered before returning to Miami.

Ivy later panics when she learns that she has left her cell phone at the fashion show, as she believes her true identity will be discovered. She is unaware, however, that her phone, along with several others, had been stolen by Nate Archibald and his shrewd boss Diana. After a conversation with Nate about the phone, she offers to help him find the owner in attempt to retrieve it. After she has accomplished this, however, Diana has discovered the connection between Ivy and Charlie and agrees to keep silent as long as Ivy works for her. Under Diana's control, Ivy is forced to procure gossip for Diana's use. She later finds the files that Bart Bass kept on Serena, Lily, Eric and himself, while Nate convinces her to leave them, she does not and in turn hands them over to Diana.

Ivy later competes to become a bridesmaid for Blair in order to get the scoop on her wedding for Diana, where her final task is to secure a kiss from Nate. They later attend the launch party of Diana's revamped 'Spectator' where they use each other to reach their own ends; Ivy to win Blair's bridesmaid spot and Nate to make Diana jealous, unknown to the other. Diana later confronts Ivy and threatens to reveal her secret, while Ivy is adamant that she had no idea that she was the one Nate wanted to make jealous. Diana later reveals to Nate and Ivy that they had been deceiving each other, leaving them angry at one another.

Although Ivy has developed feelings for Nate, Diana has threatened her to stay away from him. This changes, however, when she finds out that Ivy's ex-boyfriend, Max, is in town looking for her and sets up an elaborate plot that very nearly causes her secret to be revealed. Max finds Gossip Girl's website, along with a picture of Ivy under 'Charlie Rhodes'. He tracks Ivy down at the Van der Woodsen loft and Ivy is backed into a corner where she tells Lily and Max that her mother made her change her name to Ivy in order to avoid being used for her money. While discussing this later, Ivy offers Max money to leave town and start his restaurant in Portland, Oregon. When he finds out that Ivy is actually impersonating Charlie Rhodes, he blackmails Ivy into giving him more money than she had originally offered before deciding to stay in town. When Carol and CeCe return to town however, Carol tries to help Ivy out of her trouble with Max by getting CeCe to unlock the rest of Charlie's trust fund, which she does. After Ivy convinces Serena to drop her date with Max on Carol's advice, Max shows up to the party and attempts to out Charlie as Ivy to the rest of the Rhodes/Van der Woodsen family. It is Carol, however, that convinces the family that Max is lying, later telling Ivy that if the family found out what has happened to the real Charlie Rhodes, Ivy wouldn't be the only one out. Carol tells Ivy that she may now leave New York and start a new life with the wealth she now possesses. Ivy, however, tells her that she doesn't care about the wealth and luxury of being a part of the family, and that Carol can have the trust fund, since all she really wants is a family to call her own.

Max continues to threaten Ivy, taking her story to Nate, who has already been warned by the Van der Woodsens. When this fails, Max takes his story to Nate's cousin Trip who is a congressman, on the eve of Charlie's debut into the Upper East Side society. When Max shows up at her party, Ivy sends a blast to Gossip Girl about Blair and Chuck being there as well, sending the paparazzi into the party as well. When Blair and Chuck get into a life-threatening car accident after being tailed by the paparazzi, Ivy confesses to Rufus that she is a fraud, but before he can respond, Lily arrives with news that Blair is awake and responding, but Chuck is not. Overwhelmed with guilt, Ivy calls Carol and asks her to help her leave the Upper East Side for good.

A few weeks later, concerned by Charlie's long absence, Lily hires a private investigator to find her, but the private investigator instead finds the real Charlie Rhodes, who is attending school at Juilliard. When Lily and the "real Charlie" meet, they do not recognize each other and nor do they seem to be aware of each other's existence.

Ivy returns briefly, looking for Lily. She finds Rufus instead, but is told where Lily can be found. Georgina discovers that Ivy is back and blackmails her into attending Nate's party. While at Nate's party, Ivy runs into the real Charlie Rhodes, who goes by the alias 'Lola' and it is revealed that they took the same acting class where they grew up in Florida. Ivy attempts to leave again, but is spotted by Nate, still not knowing the truth about either of them. Nate makes a comment to Charlie about Ivy leading Charlie to get suspicious. When Ivy can finally leave, it is revealed that she has been visiting CeCe the whole time she was away.

CeCe's condition worsens and Ivy is forced to take her to the hospital, where she has a run in with the Van der Woodsens and Carol. When Charlie arrives, Ivy and Carol finally tell the truth about Carol's scheme and Ivy's role in it. Ivy is turned away by the Van der Woodsens. Following this, Ivy turns to Georgina and the two later crash CeCe's wake, during which, through the reading of CeCe's will, Ivy is left everything under her legal name instead of her alias Charlie Rhodes, revealing that CeCe knew about the fact that Ivy isn't her real granddaughter. After this revelation, Ivy kicks Lily and Rufus out of the apartment as it had been paid for by CeCe and was now hers. Ivy throws a party to commemorate the Celia Rhodes Foundation and to gain acceptance in the Upper East Side. She believes she has found an ally in William van der Woodsen after he agrees to persuade people to attend the party in exchange for money, however, it is later revealed he is working with Lily to gather evidence against Ivy to take her to court and contest CeCe's will.

After a courtroom hearing, Ivy loses all of her inheritance after Lily bribes CeCe's nurse to testify against Ivy so she can re-claim Ivy's share of the inheritance. Rufus takes pity on Ivy being without a home and family, and pays for her stay at a hotel. Lily finds this out later on and they fight, and Rufus returns to Brooklyn. Ivy later visits Lily and tries to seek her acceptance, confessing that she really wanted to be part of her family. Lily rejects her but offers her a cheque of 1 million dollars, asking her to leave and never return. Ivy leaves the apartment and tears up the cheque, revealing her confession was genuine. Later, Lily has Carol Rhodes arrested and charged with fraud in order to acquire her share of CeCe's estate for herself. After William van der Woodsen takes pity on Charlie 'Lola' Rhodes, he gives her Carol's share of CeCe's wealth so she can live on.

In the final episode of the season, Lola signs over her entire half of Cece's estate to Ivy and asks her to do one favor in return: Take Lily down in revenge for Carol's imprisonment and her manipulation of events. Ivy accepts, more than happy to help after her rejection.

=== Season 6 ===
Ivy looks in on Rufus after Lily annuls their marriage and the two soon become lovers. However, Ivy is actually sleeping with Lily's ex-husband William and using Bart in a plot to take down Lily. When Rufus sees the two kissing (although not seeing William's face), he breaks up with Ivy. Ivy helps Blair in her plans to try and take down Chuck's father and when the man dies, she believes it's finally time she and William come out in public as a couple. However, when she meets William, he is with Lily and claims to have never met Ivy before. Ivy tries to tell Lily of their relationship but Lily doesn't believe her. After Lily leaves, William informs Ivy he was using her all along to break up Lily and Rufus so he could finally have Lily to himself. He coldly informs Ivy nobody wants her around and she should just take her money and leave. In the final scene (set five years later) Ivy has written a book about her experiences that's being made into a movie, starring Olivia Burke and Lola Rhodes.

== Reception ==
The critical reception of the character had been positive until the start of Season 5. During the series fourth season, Charlie became the subject of praise with her successful integration into the Upper East Side. TV Fanatic praised and welcomed her presence on the show. In the episode The Princesses and the Frog, Steve Marsi praised her choice of confronting Vanessa alone, calling her "a natural" at schemes and that "even an outsider can thoroughly outshine an outcast." TV Guide praised the ousting of Vanessa by Charlie, stating that "it didn't take her long to cross over to "the other side"".

Beginning in the fifth season, however, her character began to receive less than favorable reviews. NY Mag and The Baltimore Sun referred to the Charlie/Ivy plot as "ridiculous". The Wall Street Journal suggested that the storyline was repetitive, baring too much of a resemblance to the Juliet and Vanessa plot in the previous season. Sharon Tharp of Ology wrote that the Charlie/Ivy plot was predictable and earned "too much screentime".
