= Lola Rhodes =

Fictional character from Gossip Girl

- Gossip Girl character
- Ella Rae Peck as Charlotte Rhodes
- First appearance: "The End of the Affair?" (episode 5.11)
- Last appearance: "New York, I Love You XOXO" (episode 6.10)
- Created by: Joshua Safran
- Portrayed by: Ella Rae Peck

In-universe information
- Alias: Charlotte Rhodes
- Nickname: Lola; Charlie (former)
- Occupation: Actress; College student (at Juilliard; departed)
- Family: William van der Woodsen (father); Carol Rhodes (mother); Scott Rosson (cousin); Serena van der Woodsen (older three-quarter sister); Eric van der Woodsen (younger three-quarter brother); Richard "Rick" Rhodes (maternal grandfather); Celia "CeCe" Rhodes (maternal grandmother; deceased)
- Relatives: Lillian "Lily" Humphrey (maternal aunt); Bartholomew "Bart" Bass (maternal step-uncle) Rufus Humphrey (maternal ex-uncle); Charles "Chuck" Bass (adoptive stepcousin); Daniel "Dan" Humphrey (ex-stepcousin); Jennifer "Jenny" Humphrey (ex-stepcousin)

Charlotte "Lola" Rhodes is a recurring character who exclusively appeared in the Gossip Girl television adaptation. Created by series producer Joshua Safran, Lola Rhodes is portrayed by actress Ella Rae Peck. The character of Charlotte "Charlie" Rhodes was initially introduced in the second half of season four, though this was later revealed to be Ivy Dickens, a struggling actress paid to impersonate her so that her mother, Carol Rhodes, could gain access to Lola's trust fund. Ella Rae Peck later appeared during the second half of the fifth season to portray the role. Lola is the cousin and biological half sister, technically three-quarter sister, of Serena van der Woodsen (Blake Lively) as a result of William van der Woodsen's (William Baldwin) affair with Lily Humphrey's sister, Carol Rhodes (Sheila Kelley).

== TV series ==
=== Season 5 ===
Lola first appeared in "The End Of The Affair?" in a chance meeting with Rufus and Lily Humphrey. She later reappeared as a caterer at the wedding of Blair Waldorf to Louis Grimaldi. During this job she meets Nate Archibald where, despite his insistence for a romantic relationship, she declines. Catering Nate's party for The Spectator, Lola bumps into Ivy Dickens, whom unbeknownst to her has spent the past year posing as her. The two chat about their acting until Nate interrupts and upon Ivy leaving he tells Lola that Ivy is called Charlie Rhodes. Baffled by this new information, she searches for her online and discovers that Ivy has been posing as her.

Lola becomes determined to discover Ivy's intentions and later runs into her mother and the rest of her family at the hospital and discovers that her mother paid Ivy to impersonate her.

In the final episode of the season, Lola signs over her entire half of Cece's estate to Ivy and asks her to do one favor in return: Take Lily down in revenge for Carol's imprisonment and her manipulation of events.

=== Season 6 ===
In season 6, it's revealed Lola is working hard on her acting career but still making sure Ivy is taking Lily down for her. Five years later, Lola is starring in a new film which is based on the autobiography that Ivy wrote; while in hair & makeup for filming, she receives the mass text revealing the true identity of Gossip Girl, something she finds hard to believe.

== Reception ==
Critics have been generally ambivalent towards the character of Lola but have been positive about her relationship with Nate.

Negative reviews of Lola and her relationship with Nate came from Television Without Pity's Jacob Clifton, who wrote that their "entire relationship was based on lies."
