= Kaylee DeFer =

American actress

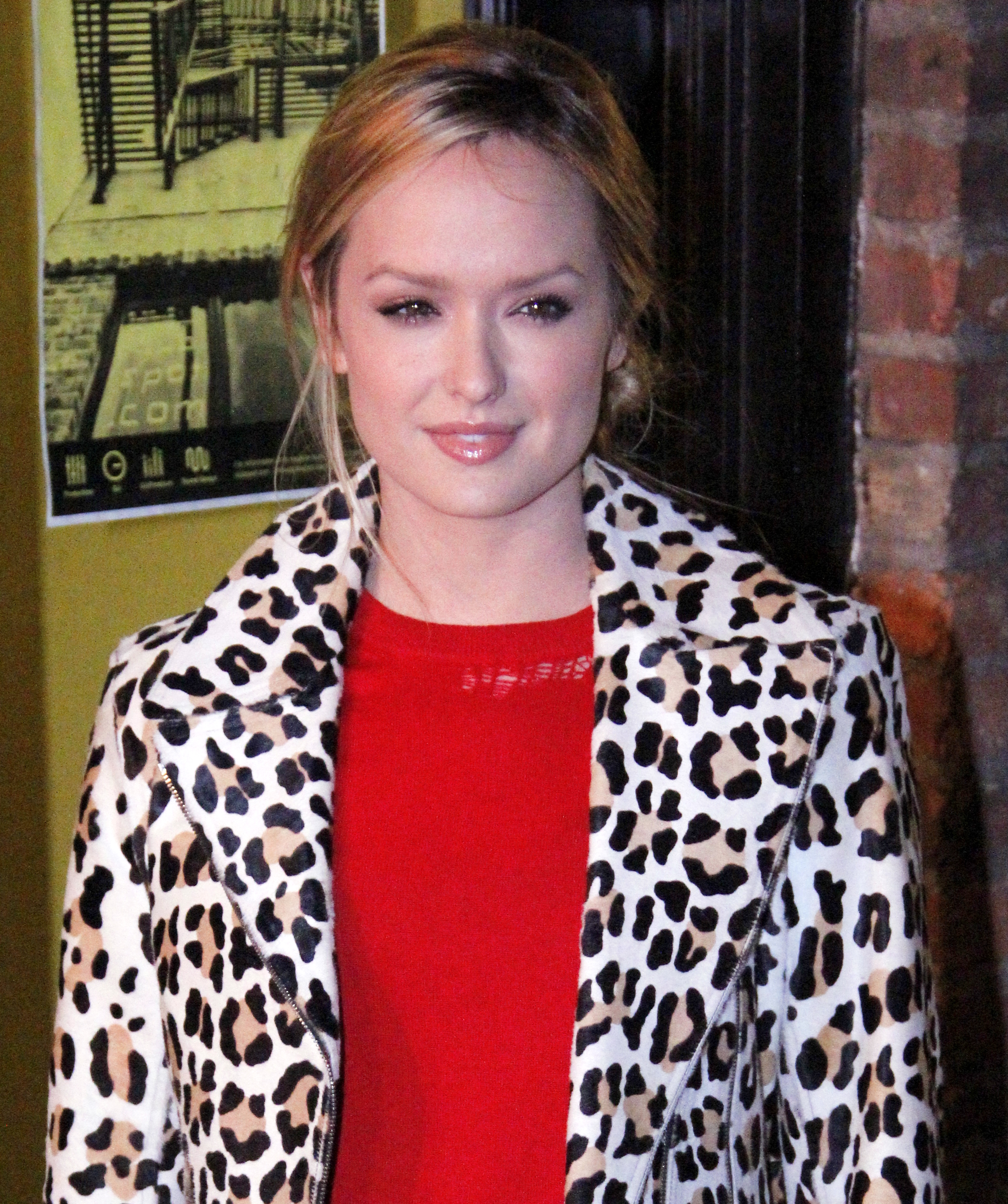
- DeFer at the Denim Habit grand opening in New York City, October 2011
- Born: Tucson, Arizona, U.S.
- Occupation: Actress
- Years active: 2003–2013
- Spouse: Michael Fitzpatrick (m. 2015)
- Children: 3

Kaylee DeFer is an American actress. She is best known for her portrayals of Hillary Gold in The War at Home and Charlie Rhodes in Gossip Girl.

== Early life ==
DeFer was born in Tucson, Arizona. In 2003, she moved to Los Angeles to pursue a career in acting.

== Career ==
DeFer made her acting debut in a March 2004 episode of the Nickelodeon sitcom Drake & Josh. She has since made a number of guest appearances on television shows such as Quintuplets, Ghost Whisperer, CSI: Miami, and How I Met Your Mother. DeFer appears on the cover of Reeve Oliver's second album, Touchtone Inferno (2007).

In May 2004, DeFer was cast as Scarlett on The WB's drama series The Mountain. The series follows the personal lives of the staff and friends at a remote ski resort. The series premiered on September 22, 2004, but was cancelled after four months.

In April 2005, DeFer landed a role on the Fox sitcom The War at Home. The series centers on the day-to-day life of Gold family who reside on Long Island, New York. DeFer portrayed teenager Hillary Gold, the eldest child who frequently misbehaves. The series premiered on September 11, 2005, to 7.2 million viewers, but received generally negative reviews from critics. The series ran for two seasons.

DeFer starred in her theatrical film debut Flicka, released in October 2006. DeFer portrayed the film's antagonist, Miranda Koop. In 2011, DeFer starred in the low-budget Western film Mattie, which was released on DVD under the title Renegade.

In April 2011, The CW announced DeFer would have a major recurring arc in both the fourth and fifth seasons of Gossip Girl. DeFer had previously auditioned for the role of Raina Thorpe, but she did not receive the part. DeFer portrayed the role of Ivy Dickens, a con artist who pretends to be Charlotte "Charlie" Rhodes in order to get access to the latter's trust fund. DeFer was reunited with The Mountain castmate Penn Badgley. She reprised her role of Ivy in the series' sixth and final season and was listed as a main cast member. In May 2013, DeFer announced plans to take a break from acting after the birth of her first son.

== Personal life ==
In January 2012, DeFer called off her engagement to jewelry designer Michael Raymond Pereira, whom she had been dating on and off since 2002.

DeFer subsequently began dating Michael Fitzpatrick, lead vocalist for the band Fitz and the Tantrums, and in May 2013, she announced that they were expecting a child together. Their first son was born in 2013. The couple got married on July 25, 2015. Their second son was born in 2017, followed by their third son in 2019.

== Filmography ==
=== Film ===
Year	Title	Role	Notes
2005	Underclassman	Des	
2006	The Powder Puff Principle	Young school board president	Short film
2006	Flicka	Miranda Koop	
2011	In My Pocket	Molly	
2011	Renegade	Mattie Springer	
2011	Red State	Dana	
2013	Darkroom	Michelle	

=== Television ===
Year	Title	Role	Notes
2004	Drake & Josh	Cute girl	Episode: "Guitar"
2004	North Shore	Emily	Episode: "Secret Service"
2004	Quintuplets	Stephanie	2 episodes
2004–2005	The Mountain	Scarlett	6 episodes
2005	Listen Up	Brooke	Episode: "Inky Dinky Don't"
2005–2007	The War at Home	Hillary Gold	Main role; 44 episodes
2007	Shark	Katie Dobbs	Episode: "Shaun of the Dead"
2008	Family Guy	Dakota (voice)	Episode: "Tales of a Third Grade Nothing"
2009	Ghost Whisperer	Angie Halsenback	Episode: "This Joint's Haunted"
2009	Bones	Tory Payne	Episode: "The Gamer in the Grease"
2010	CSI: Miami	Valerie Metcalf	Episode: "Getting Axed"
2010, 2013	How I Met Your Mother	Casey	2 episodes
2011–2012	Gossip Girl	Ivy Dickens/Charlotte "Charlie" Rhodes	Guest role (season 4); main role (seasons 5–6); 30 episodes
2011	Friends with Benefits	Mary Webber	Episode: "The Benefit of Mentors"
2012	Layover	Rebecca White	Television film
