= List of Gossip Girl characters =

The following is a list of characters for The CW teen television drama series, Gossip Girl (2007–2012) and its standalone sequel series of the same name (2021–2023). The series is based on the popular book series of the same name written by author Cecily von Ziegesar. Both series follow the lives of privileged high school students who attend the fictional Constance Billard School for Girls and St. Jude's School for Boys.

The original series starts with nine regular characters: it girl of the UES Serena van der Woodsen (Blake Lively); school queen bee Blair Waldorf (Leighton Meester); Serena's new love interest Dan Humphrey (Penn Badgley); golden boy Nate Archibald (Chace Crawford); Dan's sister Jenny Humphrey (Taylor Momsen); Nate's billionaire best friend Chuck Bass (Ed Westwick); Dan's best friend and ex-lover, the creative Vanessa Abrams (Jessica Szohr); Serena's mother, a socialite and philanthropist Lily van der Woodsen (Kelly Rutherford); and Dan Humphrey's father, former rock star turned art gallery owner, Rufus Humphrey (Matthew Settle). A tenth recurring later in the series is Serena's cousin who turns out to be a con artist, Ivy Dickens (Kaylee DeFer).

The standalone sequel series, meanwhile, features sixteen regular characters and follows the lives of a ring of teachers in addition to the students: famous influencer, it girl, and queen bee Julien Calloway (Jordan Alexander); Julien's morally-upstanding half-sister Zoya Lott (Whitney Peak); English teacher Kate Keller (Tavi Gevinson); guilty rich Otto "Obie" Bergmann IV (Eli Brown); pansexual flirt Max Wolfe (Thomas Doherty); avid literature reader Audrey Hope (Emily Alyn Lind); movie enthusiast and bisexual skateboarder Akeno "Aki" Menzies (Evan Mock), Zoya's father and lawyer Nick Lott (Johnathan Fernandez); computer science teacher Jordan Glassberg (Adam Chanler-Berat); personal stylist and trendsetter Luna La (Zión Moreno); the intimidating and powerful billionaire Monet de Haan (Savannah Lee Smith); gay classics teacher Rafa Caparros (Jason Gotay); gay theatre impresario & Max's dad, Gideon Wolfe (Todd Almond); divorced athleisure wear designer and Audrey's mother, Kiki Hope (Laura Benanti); Zoya's new troublemaker friend, Shan Barnes (Grace Duah); and Kate's friend, Wendy (Megan Ferguson)

Both series are narrated by the seemingly omniscient "Gossip Girl" (voiced by Kristen Bell); within the original series, Gossip Girl is a single character whose true identity is never fully revealed until the series finale, while in the sequel series, the Gossip Girl mantle is shared by different characters.

== Cast ==
=== Main ===
- The cast should be organized according to the series' original broadcast credits, with new cast members being added to the end of the list. Please keep in mind that main cast status is determined by the series producers, not by popularity or screen time.

| Actor | Character | Gossip Girl (2007–12) | | | | | | Gossip Girl (2021–23) | |
| Actor | Character | Season 1 | Season 2 | Season 3 | Season 4 | Season 5 | Season 6 | Season 1 | Season 2 |
| Actor | Character | 2007–08 | 2008–09 | 2009–10 | 2010–11 | 2011–12 | 2012 | 2021 | 2022–23 |
|---|---|---|---|---|---|---|---|---|---|
| Blake Lively | Serena van der Woodsen | Main | Main | Main | Main | Main | Main | | |
| Leighton Meester | Blair Waldorf | Main | Main | Main | Main | Main | Main | Photographs | |
| Penn Badgley | Dan Humphrey | Main | Main | Main | Main | Main | Main | | |
| Chace Crawford | Nate Archibald | Main | Main | Main | Main | Main | Main | | |
| Taylor Momsen | Jenny Humphrey | Main (Note: Momsen only appears as Jenny in four episodes of season 4, although she is credited as a main cast member.) | Main | Main | Main | | Special Guest | | |
| Ed Westwick | Chuck Bass | Main | Main | Main | Main | Main | Main | | |
| Kelly Rutherford | Lily van der Woodsen | Main | Main | Main | Main | Main | Main | | |
| Matthew Settle | Rufus Humphrey | Main | Main | Main | Main | Main | Main | | |
| Jessica Szohr | Vanessa Abrams | Main (Note: Originally only a guest star, Szohr gained a contract to the main cast list in the fourteenth episode of season one.) | Main | Main | Main | | Special Guest (Note: Uncredited) | | |
| Kristen Bell | Gossip Girl | Main (Note: Voice only) | Main | Main | Main | Main | Main | Main | Main |
| Kaylee DeFer | Ivy Dickens | | | | Recurring | Main | Main | | |
| Jordan Alexander | Julien Calloway | | | | | | | Main | Main |
| Whitney Peak | Zoya Lott | | | | | | | Main | Main |
| Tavi Gevinson | Kate Keller | | | | | | | Main | Main |
| Eli Brown | Otto "Obie" Bergmann IV | | | | | | | Main | Main |
| Thomas Doherty | Maximus "Max" Wolfe | | | | | | | Main | Main |
| Emily Alyn Lind | Audrey Hope | | | | | | | Main | Main |
| Evan Mock | Akeno "Aki" Menzies | | | | | | | Main | Main |
| Johnathan Fernandez | Nick Lott | | | | | | | Main | Main |
| Adam Chanler-Berat | Jordan Glassberg | | | | | | | Main | Main |
| Zión Moreno | Luna La | | | | | | | Main | Main |
| Savannah Lee Smith | Monet de Haan | | | | | | | Main | Main |
| Jason Gotay | Rafa Caparros | | | | | | | Main | |
| Todd Almond | Gideon Wolfe | | | | | | | Main | Main |
| Laura Benanti | Kiki Hope | | | | | | | Main | Main |
| Grace Duah | Shan Barnes | | | | | | | Guest | Main |
| Megan Ferguson | Wendy | | | | | | | Recurring | Main |

=== Recurring ===
| Actor | Character | Gossip Girl (2007–12) | | | | | | Gossip Girl (2021–23) | |
| Actor | Character | Season 1 | Season 2 | Season 3 | Season 4 | Season 5 | Season 6 | Season 1 | Season 2 |
| Actor | Character | 2007–08 | 2008–09 | 2009–10 | 2010–11 | 2011–12 | 2012 | 2021 | 2022–23 |
|---|---|---|---|---|---|---|---|---|---|
| Zuzanna Szadkowski | Dorota Kishlovsky | Recurring | Recurring | Recurring | Recurring | Recurring | Recurring | Guest | |
| Michelle Trachtenberg | Georgina Sparks | Recurring | Recurring | Recurring | Recurring | Recurring | Recurring | Photographs | Guest |
| Margaret Colin (Note: In the pilot episode, Eleanor Waldorf was portrayed by Florencia Lozano.) | Eleanor Waldorf-Rose | Recurring | Recurring | Recurring | Recurring | Recurring | Guest | Guest | Guest |
| Connor Paolo | Eric van der Woodsen | Recurring | Recurring | Recurring | Recurring | | Special Guest | | |
| Amanda Setton | Penelope Shafai | Recurring | Recurring | | Recurring | Recurring | | | |
| Robert John Burke | Bart Bass | Recurring | Recurring | Guest | | Guest | Recurring | | |
| Yin Chang | Nelly Yuki | Recurring | Recurring | | | | Recurring | Guest | Guest |
| Sam Robards | Howard "The Captain" Archibald | Recurring | Guest | | Recurring | | Guest | | |
| Sebastian Stan | Carter Baizen | Guest | Recurring | Recurring | | | | | |
| Caroline Lagerfelt | Celia "CeCe" Rhodes | Guest | Recurring | Recurring | Guest | Guest | | | |
| Aaron Schwartz | Vanya | | Recurring | Recurring | Recurring | | | Guest | |
| Desmond Harrington | Jack Bass | | Recurring | Recurring | Guest | Recurring | Guest | | |
| Wallace Shawn | Cyrus Rose | | Recurring | Guest | Guest | Guest | Guest | Guest | Guest |
| Sheila Kelley (Note: In the season 2 episode "Valley Girls", Carol Rhodes was portrayed by Krysten Ritter.) | Carol Rhodes | | Guest | | Guest | Recurring | | | |
| Chris Riggi | Scott Rosson | | Guest | Recurring | | | | | |
| Kevin Zegers | Damian Daalgard | | | Recurring | Recurring | | | | |
| Hilary Duff | Olivia Burke | | | Recurring | | | | | |
| William Baldwin | William van der Woodsen | | | Recurring | Guest | Recurring | Guest | | |
| Azhy Robertson (Note: This character was introduced in the 2007 series played by uncredited child actors named Samuel and Marcus Rose. Robertson plays Milo in the standalone sequel (2021).) | Milo Sparks | | | | Recurring | Recurring | | Special Guest | Special Guest |
| Hugo Becker | Louis Grimaldi | | | | Recurring | Recurring | | | |
| Katie Cassidy | Juliet Sharp | | | | Recurring | | Special Guest | | |
| David Call | Ben Donovan | | | | Recurring | | | | |
| Michael Boatman | Russell Thorpe | | | | Recurring | | | | |
| Tika Sumpter | Raina Thorpe | | | | Recurring | | | | |
| Elizabeth Hurley | Diana Payne | | | | | Recurring | | | |
| Ella Rae Peck | Charlotte "Lola" Rhodes | | | | | Recurring | Special Guest | | |
| Barry Watson | Steven Spence | | | | | | Recurring | | |
| Sofia Black-D'Elia | Sage Spence | | | | | | Recurring | | |
| Luke Kirby | Davis Calloway | | | | | | | Recurring | Recurring |
| Elizabeth Lail | Lola Morgan | | | | | | | Recurring | |
| John Benjamin Hickey | Roy Sachs | | | | | | | Recurring | Recurring |

== Recurring characters ==
=== Family members ===
Recurring characters who are family to one or more main character. Names are listed alphabetically.

==== Anne Archibald ====
Portrayed by Francie Swift in seasons one, two and four, Anne Archibald (née van der Bilt) is the mother of Nate Archibald. During the events of the first season, she aids her husband in dealing with Eleanor Waldorf's accounts. She once promised to Eleanor Waldorf to give Blair her Cornelius Vanderbilt engagement ring should Nate and Blair ever be engaged but when Blair witnesses Nate's troubles with his father she ends the relationship. By the second season, Nate's mother whose financial assets have been frozen since her husband's guilty departure have caught up with her and their house in Manhattan is seized, leaving Nate to lodge in temporarily with the Humphreys. Anne Archibald's reputation was also in danger during her financial situation with Chuck giving her loan after selling his club, Victrola but this causes Nate to end his friendship with Chuck. Her financial troubles come to an end when Nate convinces his father to come clean to the FBI and she sheds tears for the arrest of her husband. A short while before her husband is released from prison however she files for divorce.

==== Howard Archibald ====
Portrayed by Sam Robards in seasons one, two, four and six. Howard "The Captain" Archibald is the father of Nate Archibald. Howard is a white-collar criminal and a recovering cocaine addict. He leaves to escape arrest, still addicted to cocaine and Nate punches his father before the Captain could get into his limo and flee to Dominica. In the second season, when he returned to New York, to take Nate and his mother with him, Nate gave him a choice. Either go back to Dominica and never speak to his family again or turn himself in to the police. Howard decided to do the right thing and chose to turn himself in. In the fourth season, Howard later receives a file for divorce while in jail, a few months before his release from prison. When he is paroled, Howard soon takes a job with Russell Thorpe.

==== Bart Bass ====
Portrayed by Robert John Burke in season one, two, five and six, Bartholomew "Bart" Bass, whose birthday is always on Columbus Day, is Chuck's billionaire father, founder of Bass Industries and was married to Lily van der Woodsen and eventually became the main antagonist of the series. His family lived at the New York Palace Hotel, which he owned. His money was self-made, as opposed to inherited like most Upper East Side families. He was controlling with his family, ruthless in business and demonstrated little affection for Chuck, and it's revealed that this is because he holds his son responsible for his late wife's death (Chuck's mother died while giving birth to him.) At times Bart appears to care about his son, and asked him to be his best man at the wedding. Bart complimented Chuck on his speech, and said he was proud of his commitment to Blair. In season 2, with Dan's help, he and Chuck try to mend their relationship, but he suddenly dies in a limo accident. In season 3, he reappears as a "ghost" on the anniversary of his death. In season 5, Diana Payne claims that she is Chuck's biological mother, conceiving him after she and Bart had an affair, but it is revealed to be untrue. When looking for Diana's secret, he is discovered alive. Chuck discovers how his father pays associates to stage fatal “accidents” for anyone possessing damaging evidence about him. As Chuck and Blair investigating Bart’s crimes, Bart has Nate imprisoned. He makes a deal for Chuck to permanently leave the country in exchange for freeing Nate and keeping Blair safe. Behind his back, Bart arranges for Chuck to be killed on his flight to Moscow. During Bart’s “Man of the Year” gala, news breaks that a Bass Industries private jet, presumably carrying Chuck, has crashed. Dan, who was supposed to reveals it was actually for Chuck, just as Chuck steps onto the stage and publicly reveals his father’s assassination attempt. Bart smoothly dismisses Chuck’s claims as the erratic ravings of a drug-addicted son, and the crowd believes him. Bart lures Chuck up to the building’s rooftop, where Chuck confronts him about the plane plot and lifelong abuse. During the ensuing physical altercation, Bart falls over the edge of the roof and hangs onto the ledge, begging for help as Blair arrives. Chuck refuses to help, and Bart loses his grip and falls to his death while Blair watches in horror.

==== Jack Bass ====
Portrayed by Desmond Harrington in seasons two through six. Jack Bass is Chuck's uncle who comes to New York upon hearing of his brother, Bart Bass' death, and slept with Blair on New Year's. Jack headed Bass Industries in Australia and served as Chuck's legal guardian when Bart died. He then plots to take Bass Industries from Chuck and sets him up by having the Board of Bass Industries to witness his debauchery and inebriation. Chuck turns to Lily to remove Jack from Bass Industries due to his incompetence at handling the assets of Bass Industries causes the business to become stagnant. Jack loses hold of Bass Industries when Lily decides to become Chuck's new legal guardian, thereby transferring a significantly large power of the company to her. Jack then confronts Lily while he is high and attempts to rape her until Chuck has him kicked out of the opera. Jack is then sent back to Sydney. By the third season, during Chuck's opening of his new hotel, Blair aids him in getting a liquor license for Chuck by contacting Jack. Chuck confronts Blair for contacting Jack and Blair receives flowers and a note stating that the liquor license is fake. Blair and Chuck eventually allow the police to end the opening party and therefore receive enough press and publicity for future clients for a genuine speakeasy that Chuck has been planning. Chuck goes to find Jack, whom could maybe help him take back Bass Industries from Lily, who is going to sell it. Jack returned to help Chuck in season four. in season 5, Jack, back to New York to thank him for saving his life in the car accident by donating blood, but starts to doubt Jack's story when Chuck investigates and learns that Jack was recently diagnosed positive with Hepatitis C, and a test on Chuck turns to be negative. At the end of episode, Chuck finds out that it wasn't Jack who saved his life and assumes it was Elizabeth Fisher, Jack appears to verify his story by saying that she didn't want him to know. Although, near the end, there is a scene with Jack in his limo calling someone and telling her that Chuck knows that Jack didn't donate him the blood, and that she should come. In prior episodes to episode 22 "Raiders of the Lost Ark", Chuck begins to believe that Jack Bass is more than an uncle and is actually his biological father, but this isn't proved in the episode previously stated. In the series finale, he is shown to be in a relationship with Georgina Sparks.

==== Alison Humphrey ====
Portrayed by Susan Misner. Alison is Rufus's estranged wife and Dan and Jenny's mother. She had an affair while living and working as an artist in Hudson, and Rufus cannot forgive her for the transgression. She returns for the holidays during the first season, but Rufus asks her to leave after a former lover attempts to contact her at the Brooklyn loft. She and Rufus ultimately end their marriage.

==== CeCe Rhodes ====
Portrayed by Caroline Lagerfelt in seasons one, two, three, four and five, Celia Catherine "CeCe" Rhodes is Lily and Carol's mother and Scott, Chuck, Serena, Lola and Eric's grandmother. She is the ex-wife of Rick Rhodes. She lives in Montecito, California and visits Lily, Serena and Eric in New York City a few times every year. She is portrayed as a very wealthy, highly conservative, uptight, selfish, intimidating, snobbish, and impassive socialite who looks down and scorns at all people who are of middle or lower classes. She caused the breakup of Rufus and Lily by making Lily choose between her family inheritance and Rufus. Intimidated, Lily chose her inheritance. CeCe also tried to break up Serena and Dan to no avail by inviting Carter Baizen (who comes from a wealthy family) to the cotillion. During the first season, CeCe manipulated her daughter and granddaughter by declaring that she had a terminal illness, claiming that the doctors found 'something' in her lungs. Although she later admitted that this was a lie to gain sympathy, she was later seen taking pills. Her cold and manipulative personality changes in the second season when she lets Dan into the White party by making him her escort, seeing that he still has feelings for Serena. After Bart Bass' funeral, she reveals the reason why Lily was in a sanatorium. During the events of Serena's arrest, Lily and CeCe resume their mother-daughter fight but later patch up their problems before CeCe leaves. CeCe's supposed sudden illness in the third season causes Lily to leave Manhattan to take care of her in California for a couple of months, with CeCe returning for an appearance on the Thanksgiving episode. CeCe returned to Manhattan in season four to support Lily's impending jail sentence along with Lily's estranged sister, Carol. In the second season episode "Valley Girls", a younger CeCe is portrayed by Cynthia Watros. In Season 5, CeCe Rhodes arrives back in New York where Lily and Serena are planning to throw her a Studio 54 party on her birthday. There's a scheme at the party about her granddaughter Charlie Rhodes who is revealed as Ivy Dickens because Ivy's ex-boyfriend came to CeCe's party by invitation of Serena. After that CeCe knew all of her fake granddaughter, Ivy Dickens', story to herself but still love Ivy because of her kindness and CeCe knew about Carol and William's affair. Ivy also finds out that CeCe is sick, but keeps it a secret. In episode 16 "Cross Rhodes", it revealed that Charlie/Ivy is caring for CeCe in the hospital and is concerned about her condition as Ivy is the only person that makes CeCe feel safe. At the end of the episode CeCe dies. Ivy Dickens is announced as CeCe's heir and we learn that CeCe was apparently aware the whole time of Ivy's real identity.

==== Cyrus Rose ====
Portrayed by Wallace Shawn in seasons two, three, four, five and six. Cyrus Rose is Eleanor Waldorf's divorce attorney and an entertainment lawyer, who becomes her new love interest in season 2. Cyrus is also the father of Aaron Rose, from a previous marriage. Blair is excited to meet him at first, as she believes her mother to have the best taste in men. She is shocked to find that he is old, bald, 5 feet tall, with a crude, jolly personality, and is a 'hugger'. Blair describes meeting him as "expecting Cary Grant and getting Danny DeVito" He also has a catchphrase, "Not enough!", once using the catchphrase to comment on Blair's pumpkin pie during Thanksgiving, and on hugs and other occasions. During Blair's eighteenth birthday, she and Cyrus have a conversation about Mei Li, the 'golden lion', a Vietnamese woman he met during the Vietnam war that leads him to divorce his first wife. When Mei Li died during the Vietnam war, he didn't find love until he met Eleanor Waldorf. Blair uses this knowledge to separate Cyrus from Eleanor but Cyrus uses the arrival of Cyndi Lauper to prey on Blair's guilt causing Blair to admit her mistake and slowly accept Cyrus. The two return to her eighteenth party to convince Eleanor to take him back. They get engaged the day after and announce it during Thanksgiving, bringing his jolly family with him that irritates Blair. Cyrus and Eleanor get married during the 2nd season. Cyrus returns in the 3rd season and convinces Dorota to get married, buying her and Vanya an apartment in Queens. In Season 4, after Blair and Louis get engaged, Cyrus and Eleanor return to throw them an engagement party. In Season 5, Cyrus hosts a Yom Kippur dinner and the same day he and Eleanor find out about Blair's pregnancy. At the dinner, Blair is presented with a contract about the custody of the baby and Cyrus, being a lawyer, quickly finds all the faults and tight guidelines contained in it. He attends Blair's wedding, and walks her down the aisle with Harold on her other side. Cyrus makes his last appearance in the Season 6 finale when he marries Chuck and Blair at the Bethesda Fountain. In the time jump, he's shown to still be married to Eleanor. Cyrus once again appeared in the tenth episode of the 2021 sequel series as Gideon Wolfe’s lawyer & friend along with his wife, Eleanor.

==== Scott Rosson ====
Scott was portrayed by Chris Riggi in Seasons 2 & 3. Scott Rosson is the biological son of Rufus Humphrey and Lily van der Woodsen. He was born at a French hospital sometime in 1986, whom Lily secretly gave up without Rufus's knowledge. When Rufus discovers this, he decides he wants to locate him. He and Lilly meet with Scott's adoptive parents in Boston, who inform them that he recently died in a boat accident. But it's revealed later on that Scott's younger brother was the one who actually died. In the season finale of season 2, Scott leaves home to go to New York to find Rufus and Lilly while his adoptive parents believe he's in Portland. He pretends to be a student at NYU, and develops a romantic relationship with Vanessa. When she discovers his real identity, she helps him try to connect with Rufus and Dan. His mother reappears right before he is able to tell them the truth. Scott tells her that she had no right to keep his birth parents away from him, but she explains that she and his father were heartbroken after losing his brother, and that they were afraid of losing him too if he met his rich birth parents. He decides to leave, but reappears in the episode "Rufus Getting Married" along with Georgina Sparks. He attempts to talk to a distraught Lily, who, believing him to be a stranger, yells at him to leave her alone. When Georgina tells Lily and Rufus that Scott is their son, they rush to the bus station in order to stop him from leaving. Lily apologizes for her behavior earlier, and says that she always wanted to meet him. The two of them, along with Rufus, embrace together and go to the store.

==== Maureen van der Bilt ====
Portrayed by Holley Fain in seasons two and three, Maureen van der Bilt is Tripp's wife. She reveals her more manipulative side on the 3rd season when she concocts a plan to have Trip win the Congressional seat left by the late Congressman Krueger. She hires someone to purposefully drown himself to be saved by Trip, giving him an advantage to win the election by giving him a heroic image. When Nate and Vanessa discover that the man in the video was hired to help Trip win the election, Nate and Trip accuse William and swear that they will avoid any association with him. William soon discovers Maureen's plot but only after Trip wins the election. Serena then earns her ire when she and Trip start an affair and are discovered by Chuck during Thanksgiving, with Nate revealing the affair to Maureen. An upset Maureen leaves early for Thanksgiving but returns for her jacket, identical to Lily's, and gets Lily's letter from her ex-husband. Maureen uses it to blackmail Serena, but offers her a chance to become Trip's mistress, something she and Trip have agreed on to save his career. She decides to keep her husband from getting into any more trouble and silences him when he tries to justify the accident with Serena to Nate.

==== Trip van der Bilt ====
Portrayed by Aaron Tveit in seasons two, three and five, William "Trip" van der Bilt III is Nate's older, "political minded" cousin, who was getting married in the second season and argues with Vanessa over Nate's future. He then convinces Nate to take the internship at the Mayor's office but Nate does otherwise by traveling to Europe for the summer. In the third season he runs for office, with Nate's help and wins the congressional seat. Trip starts an affair with Serena when he discovers that Maureen created a plot that would win him the election. Their affair ruins his marriage and compromises his career and is discovered during a disastrous Thanksgiving. The following day, Trip and Maureen agree to certain terms concerning Serena and his career. Serena refuses to continue such an agreement of her becoming a mistress and they fight. While on the road back to Manhattan, Trip and Serena collide towards a bridge and Trip places Serena on the driver's seat to remove himself from any implication of arrest. Nate later punches him for getting Serena into an accident. Trip resurfaces in Season 5 when Nate gets a tip that Trip's wife is having an affair. Trip causes Chuck and Blair's car accident, intending to target Nate out of jealousy.

==== William van der Bilt ====
Portrayed by James Naughton in seasons two, three and five, William van der Bilt is Nate Archibald's grandfather through his mother Anne Archibald and the patriarch of the powerful van der Bilt family. William is very proud of his family's political heritage and tries to convince Nate to follow the family business, having already convinced his cousin Tripp to do so. William appears to care for his family, but is not above manipulating them to further his own agendas, such as when he asks Blair to "talk" to Nate about going to Yale instead of Columbia. Previously, he had refused to help Nate's mother when the Captain was charged with embezzlement, leading to a falling-out between his grandson and himself. In "The Grandfather" Nate reconnects with his mother's family and his grandfather exerts his considerable influence over him, contributing to tensions with Vanessa and Blair. So far Nate has resisted William's suggestions regarding his future political career.

==== Eric van der Woodsen ====
Portrayed by Connor Paolo since the pilot, Eric van der Woodsen is the troubled younger brother of Serena and heir to the Van Der Woodsen fortune, his suicide attempt becomes the catalyst for Serena's homecoming. Revealed his homosexuality later on in season one to everyone, after his boyfriend Asher pretends to have a relationship with Jenny Humphrey. His friendship with Jenny is repaired after she apologizes in the beginning of the second season. They soon become best friends through the second season. This once again falls apart during Season 3 after Jenny accepts her role as Queen Bee but soon, Eric makes amends with her after Serena's accident. He then begins to date Jonathan Whitney but their relationship falls apart due to Eric's once obsessive need to "teach Jenny a lesson". In the next season, he begins dating a bisexual man named Elliot. In the reboot/sequel, it is revealed that Eric and Jonathan got back together and married.

==== William van der Woodsen ====
Dr. William van der Woodsen, portrayed by William Baldwin in seasons three, four, five and six, is Lily's first husband and the father of Serena and Eric. Lily hides the fact that she has cancer from her family except her mother and goes to her ex-husband for treatment. When Rufus finds out, it causes a strain in their marriage. Meanwhile, Serena is angry with Lily for concealing this from her since Serena had been searching for her father for these past 3 years. When William comes back to the Upper East Side, he is met with hostility from his family. Lily decides that she needs him; Eric is cautious about his agenda, Serena decides she wants to get to know her father; and Rufus is angry at his intrusion. Although William really had been treating Lily, he continues to keep her just sick enough for him to be needed because he had fallen in love with her again and misses his family. Jenny wanted her Humphrey family back and the rest of the family finds out William's plot to separate Lily and Rufus. When Serena finds out, she is especially devastated, and William leaves town as the police closes in on him. He returns in season four when Lily is arrested to support his family. He also makes amends with Rufus. In Season 5, William van der Woodsen returns to the Upper East Side for the wake, and is the executor of CeCe's estate. Ivy Dickens is announced as CeCe's heir and we learn that CeCe was apparently aware the whole time of Ivy's real identity. Carol Rhodes also reveals the identity of Charlie's father as William Van der Woodsen. In season 6, it is shown that William is in a relationship with Ivy, the two seemingly working together for a plot to take Lilly down. When Bart Bass dies, William consoles Lilly about it and the two rekindle their old love. Ivy is confused when she is ready to tell Lilly about them and William claims to have never met Ivy before. In private, William reveals to Ivy that he was using her all along in a plan to get back with Lilly and coldly dismisses her. The final moments of the series reveal that William and Lilly have remarried.

==== Eleanor Waldorf ====
Portrayed by Florencia Lozano in the pilot and Margaret Colin since episode four, Eleanor Waldorf is the fashion designer mother of Blair Waldorf. Her decades-long marriage to Blair's father, Harold Waldorf, ended when Harold left her to pursue a relationship with a French male model, Roman. It is implied through flashbacks that Eleanor knew about Harold's sexuality. Her clothing line 'Eleanor Waldorf Designs' is being distributed by Barney's and Bendel's. She once employed Jenny as an overworked intern. She later marries her divorce attorney, Cyrus Rose. In the 2021 sequel series, Eleanor made an appearance along with her husband, Cyrus, as they host a Hanukkah dinner attended by Gideon & Max Wolfe and Kiki & Audrey Hope. She later gave advice to Kiki, as both are designers who got cheated by their husbands.

==== Harold Waldorf ====
Portrayed by John Shea in seasons one, two and five. Harold Waldorf is Blair's father who went to France to live with his male lover Roman. He traditionally makes pumpkin pie during Thanksgiving but hasn't made it since Blair's last Thanksgiving with him, before he came out and left for Europe. He returns for the holidays with his partner, Roman, a model once used by Harold's ex-wife, Eleanor. Roman earns Blair's spite during Christmas by breaking his leg, inviting an old flame of Roman's that frustrates Harold. Harold speaks with Blair about the incident and then shows her his life in France through a video. He now lives in France, tending a vineyard and has a cat named Cat, the same name as the cat in Blair's favorite movie, Breakfast at Tiffany's. He returns in the second season during Thanksgiving when Blair first thought that her mother didn't invite him. He and Blair share a pie during thanksgiving. He gives Blair a bulldog named Handsome Dan whom Blair renames Handsome. During Blair's hazing incident that sparked a controversy with Miss Carr and Dan and the almost removal of Gossip Girl's blog, Blair convinces her father and the parent's council of Constance-St.Jude's by showing a picture of Dan in a compromising position with Miss Carr, thus securing her admission to Yale. When he overhears Blair's conversation about the picture only being eerily prophetic and untrue, Harold speaks with Blair and tells her that he saw a different side of her and is disappointed that he lied for her indirectly. He then tells Blair that the college she is admitted to doesn't matter and that the person she becomes matters more.

== Other characters ==
=== Georgina Sparks ===
Portrayed by Michelle Trachtenberg in seasons one till six, Georgina Sparks is a ruthless, manipulative girl from Serena's past who returns to New York City in the final episodes of season one after escaping drug treatment in Utah. Before that, she was supposed to be at an Equestrian circuit but sold her show pony for cocaine, prompting her parents to send her to rehab. Being Serena's friend, she wants Serena to be back to her old self and join her in doing things they used to do together. Her sudden return causes Serena to relapse into her old habits and even fixes Serena's drink which causes her to wake up late for her SATs. After Serena asks that she leave Manhattan, she becomes even more determined to ruin her life. Georgina persuades Dan to almost sleep with her, but this leads to a confrontation with Serena. Blair, taking matters into her own hands, informs her parents of her location, persuades Dan to make Georgina fall for Blair's trap and is sent to a reform school recommended by Blair herself. She reappears late in the second season where Georgina is at a church camp and appears to be a completely reformed "saved" Christian. That is, until Blair persuades her to help them in a plot to take down Poppy. After which, Georgina goes back to her old scheming ways. At the end of the second season, she is about to attend NYU and requests Blair as her roommate. She reappears in the first few episodes of the third season and surprises Blair Waldorf when she shows up as her lovely roommate. After her relationship with Dan is once again thwarted, followed by blackmailing Vanessa and ruining Rufus and Lily's wedding, she gets tricked and sent away with a Russian prince, a plan to get rid of her set by Blair and with the assistance of Dorota, by exiling her to Europe. At the end of season 3, after a long absence, Georgina returns to New York City from her enforced exile in Belarus disguised by wearing a blonde wig and a large coat, desperately seeking the help of various Upper-East Siders with her "problem". It is revealed that Georgina is pregnant, and claims it is Dan's child. At the start of season 4, she runs off again, leaving Dan with their son Milo but it is later revealed that he is not the father and that it was just another one of Georgina's schemes. Georgina takes Milo back when Dan signs the birth certificate, ending her manipulative plot and leaves Dan. Georgina later returns at the very end of season 4 for the Constance Billiard alumni event in hopes of stirring up drama. She reveals to Serena and others in attendance that she is currently living in Bedford, New York, is married to a young Wall Street stockbroker intern, and is outright bored with her current lifestyle of being a stay-at-home-mother. Georgina accidentally learns the secret behind Serena's cousin Charlie and informs her to keep in touch. In Season 5 at Blair's wedding, it is revealed that Georgina steps in as the 'new' Gossip Girl, the anonymous narrator of the series, as the 'real 'Gossip Girl' abandoned her post following Chuck and Blair's accident. In the season 5 finale, it is revealed that she will help Dan write his follow up to "Inside". Having left him for Chuck, Dan promises to write the book that he should previously published, which Georgina, who has her own score to settle with the Upper East Side, is more than happy to help him with. In the series finale, she is shown to be in a relationship with Jack Bass and helps Blair and Chuck with their problem regarding Bart Bass.

She returns in the 2021 series after discovering Kate's identity behind the new Gossip Girl.

=== Isabel Coates ===
Portrayed by Nicole Fiscella in seasons one, two and four, Isabel Coates is Blair's loyal sidekick, who remains her friend despite her losing rank as Queen Bee. She was best friends with Kati Farkas and tends to match outfits with her. During the first season, she and Kati often appeared in Blair's Audrey Hepburn dreamscapes and at one point she and Kati also appear in Dan's dreams. She is also a concert pianist. Isabel and Penelope contribute to the new rift between Blair and Serena when the position of Queen shifts from Blair to Serena. Her see-through dress that she intended to wear to the Snowflake Ball is used to humiliate Vanessa. Isabel, Penelope and Nelly Yuki are all present when they plan on declaring Emma Boardman as the new Queen, which went to Jenny. Both Isabel and Penelope refuse to have a girl from Brooklyn carry out their legacy but Blair convinces them otherwise. Isabel, together with Kati, returned at the end of season four at a Constance reunion.

=== Kati Farkas ===
Portrayed by Nan Zhang in seasons one, four, five and six, Kati Farkas is Blair's loyal sidekick until she loses her rank as Queen Bee. She was best friends with Isabel Coates and regularly matches outfits with her. During the first season, she and Isabel often appeared in Blair's Audrey Hepburn dreamscapes and at one point she and Isabel also appear in Dan's dreams. Kati's brother owns the apartment that would be the setting place for Blair's Japanese-themed seventeenth birthday, which led to Blair and Chuck's continuing secret relationship during the first season. Her parents move her back to Israel after spring break. Kati returned with Isabel for a Constance event in the penultimate episode of season four and the season finale. In season five, Kati returns to compete with Blair's former minions, Penelope and Jessica, to become Blair's bridesmaid in her upcoming nuptials. In the sixth season, Kati and Jessica still continue being Blair's loyal minions.

=== Dorota Kishlovsky ===
Portrayed by Zuzanna Szadkowski since the second episode, Dorota Kishlovsky is the Waldorfs' maid. Despite often snapping at her in numerous episodes, Blair is shown to see Dorota as a mother figure and her closest confidant. Dorota is also claimed to act as Blair's mother figure. This is even claimed in one of the episodes where the characters stated "Dorota practically raised Blair." In the web-series "Chasing Dorota", it is revealed that Dorota is actually a Polish countess with a secret husband, Stanisław. Dorota and Slainslaw's marriage was actually arranged by their parents. She fled to America to escape her family and began working for the Waldorfs in 2004. She eventually divorces her husband after falling in love with Vanya, the Russian doorman at the van der Woodsens' apartment building. In "The Treasure of Serena Madre" she is revealed to be unexpectedly pregnant. They get married in "The Unblairable Lightness of Being" when she finds out that her family will be visiting her. She gives birth to a daughter named Anastasia in the third season finale, and she and Vanya move into an apartment in Queens, bought for them by Cyrus. In the series finale, we find out the identity of Gossip Girl, but in the same episode it's said by Blair that she thought Dorota was Gossip Girl. It is also claimed in the Cosmopolitan interview, that Zuzanna herself, thought Dorota was Gossip Girl and was shocked that she wasn't.

In the season 5 premiere episode, she finds out that Blair is pregnant and covers it up by announcing her own pregnancy. She later gives birth to a son named Leo.

In the 2021 sequel series, Dorota made an appearance in Cyrus Rose’s annual Hanukkah dinner along with her husband, Vanya (Aaron Schwartz), and their kids, Ana and Leo.

=== Carter Baizen ===
Portrayed by Sebastian Stan in seasons one, two and three, Carter Baizen was a St. Jude's graduate and rival of Nate and Chuck. It is mentioned that he turned his back on his parents and so was left without a trust fund and was forced to take matters into his own hands by shaping his own future, something that Carter reveals to Serena a week before the cotillion. In the second season, Carter resurfaces in New York with the mysterious Elle but ends up being involved with Blair and sleeps with her, contributing to her downward spiral. He soon leaves New York as Serena and Chuck intervene. In the second season finale, Carter returns to New York to tell Serena that he has found her father. During the premiere of season three, it is discovered that he and Serena spent their summer in Europe in pursuit of her father. In light of Serena's failure to capture her father's attention, Carter reveals his feelings to Serena and they share a kiss. Their relationship ends when it is revealed that he left Bree Buckley's cousin at the altar, earning the wrath of the Buckleys as Bree has her cousins called in during Rufus and Lily's wedding to bring Carter to Texas to work in an oil field to pay off his debt. Serena then gambles on a high-stakes poker game for Carter's freedom and fails. She then takes matters into her own hands and has him freed but Carter refuses to resume their relationship, saying that he would have preferred it if Serena didn't save him so that he could make amends and leaves. Carter resumes his habit of lying when he informs Serena of her father's definite location. Serena disappears with him, which creates a strain in her relationship with Nate. Serena later finds out that he had known about where her father was since before they began dating, but had been delaying the information from her in order to get closer to her. She then forces him out of the limo.

=== Headmistress Queller ===
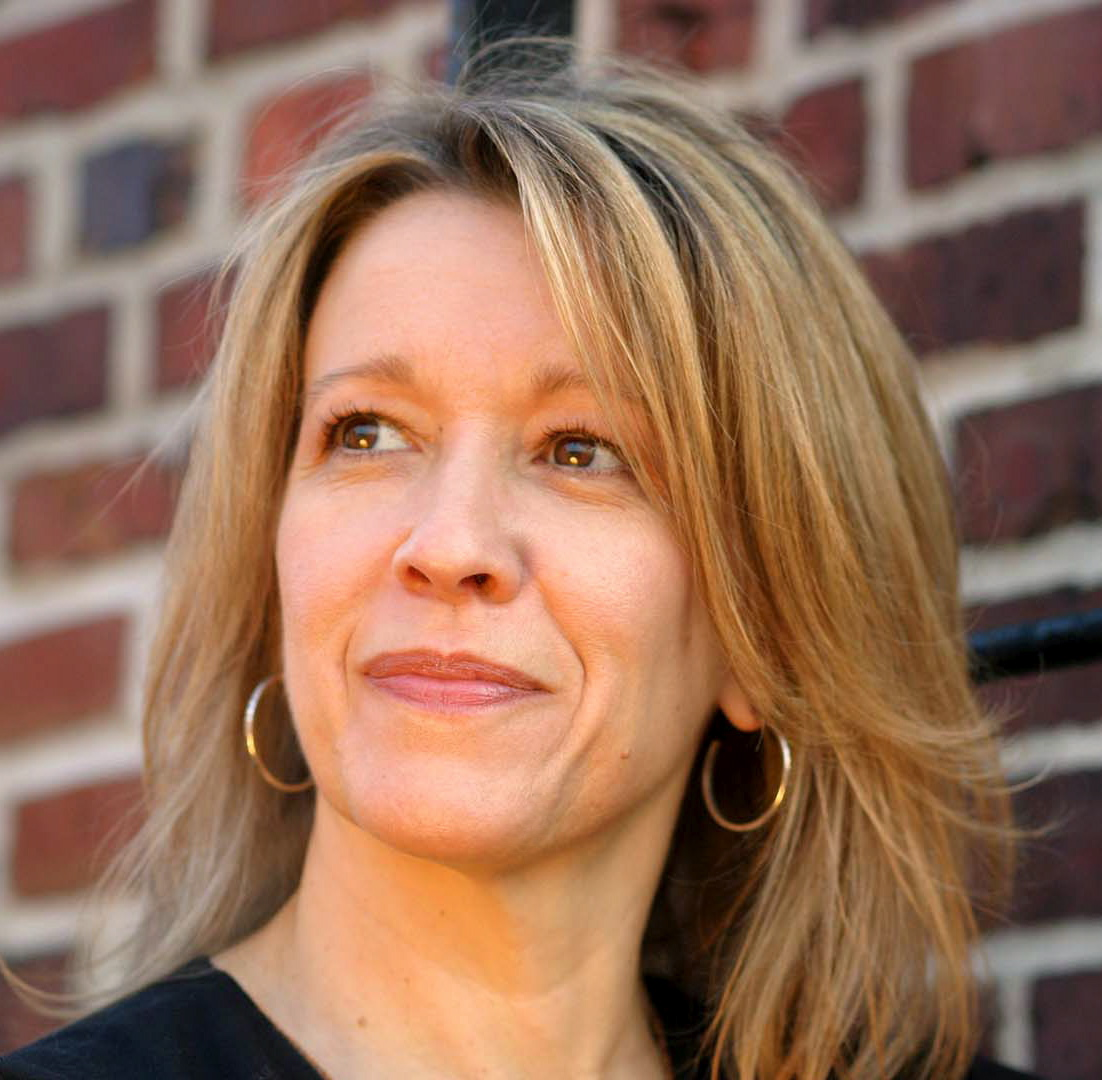
Linda Emond portrayed Headmistress Queller in seasons one and two.

Portrayed by Linda Emond in season one and the beginning of season two and by Jan Maxwell at the end of season two and for one episode in season four, Headmistress Queller is Constance Billiard School for Girls' and St. Jude's School for Boys' headmistress. Blair mentions that she and Headmistress Queller had tea when she first applied to Yale. She is first introduced in the first season as the new Headmistress and immediately faces trouble with the junior class. She pragmatically interrogates Constance Billard and St. Jude's students when an accident in the school swimming pool involving most of the Junior class reaches her ears and threatens expulsion if the perpetrator doesn't come forward. Serena comes forward but doesn't get expelled and instead finds out that Bart Bass paid off her headmistress that earned Serena community service. In the second season, Jenny rejects a meeting with her when she has been skipping school and instead working at Eleanor Waldorf's atelier. Jenny eventually returns to Constance. In the later episodes, Blair seeks advice from her when she discovers that she is waitlisted for Yale and reassures her that all Constance students eventually get accepted as long as their transcripts are untarnished. When Miss Carr informs her of Blair's hazing against her, headmistress Queller gives Blair detention through community service. Blair's hazing incident eventually reaches the ears of Yale and Blair is no longer accepted. Blair eventually attempts to apply to Sarah Lawrence College but has no chance because of her hazing incident and that the dean only spoke with her as a favor from headmistress Queller.

=== Penelope Shafai ===
Portrayed by Amanda Setton in seasons one, two, four and five, Penelope Shafai is a member of Blair's clique until she was dethroned as queen bee; and constantly shifts her allegiance between Blair and Jenny. She makes no secret of her crush on Nate when she aids in Blair's dethroning and Jenny's ascent as Queen with Jenny earning her and Hazel's favor when Jenny salvages herself after Blair attempted to sabotage her birthday. She helps host Jenny's party with Asher and gives the freshman the benefit of the doubt when she lied about having sex with Asher Hornsby, eventually ending her friendship with her when Jenny reveals the truth. She is also a national Merit Scholar. Chuck persuades her to ruin Amanda Lasher's hair which ends up in a fight between Dan and Serena. Isabel and Penelope contribute to the new rift between Blair and Serena when the position of Queen shifts from Blair to Serena. Penelope attempts to get Nate as her date to the Snowflake Ball, planning with the girls and a reluctant Jenny to humiliate Vanessa. Isabel, Penelope and Nelly Yuki are all present when they plan on declaring Emma Boardman as the new Queen, which went to Jenny. Penelope refuses to have a girl from Brooklyn carry out their legacy but Blair convinces them otherwise. Penelope returns in season 4 as she attends Columbia University. She is currently a member of an exclusive club, the Hamilton House. She also continues to be Blair's loyal right-hand woman, and the ring-leader of her sidekicks. The following season, Penelope competes, alongside Blair's former minions Kati and Jessica, for a spot as Blair's bridesmaid in her upcoming wedding.

=== Hazel Williams ===
Portrayed by Dreama Walker in seasons one and two, Hazel Williams is a member of Blair's clique until she was dethroned as queen bee; constantly shifts her allegiance between Blair and Jenny. Jenny steals her mother's Valentino dress during Jenny's birthday. She forgives her right after Jenny impresses Blair's clique by bringing Nate during their dinner at Butter. Like Penelope, she gives Jenny the benefit of the doubt when Jenny lies about having sex with Asher, eventually breaking her friendship with Jenny. Along with Isabel and Penelope, she succeeds in publicly humiliating Vanessa at the Snowflake Ball. Hazel has tendency to be desperate for a boyfriend and Jenny at one point blackmails her to treat Nelly Yuki better by reminding her that she once hooked up with her cousin. She also regularly checks Gossip Girl's blog and once suffered symptoms of withdrawal when Rachel Carr has cellphones banned from Constance premises.

=== Nelly Yuki ===
Portrayed by Yin Chang in seasons one, two and six, Nelly Yuki is Blair's academics rival. Depicted as a bookworm, she's a Merit Scholar, a Peabody Scholar, and an Intel Science Talent Search Finalist. Itzhak Perlman gave her first violin and her parents own a substantial amount of property in Tribeca. Despite being sabotaged by Blair during the SATs, she has a short-lived friendship with her, and sides with Blair (along with Isabel) during Blair's battle for the throne. She also brands Jenny Humphrey a liar, ending Jenny's status as Queen Bee. Nelly is part of Blair's clique in season two. Jenny tries to help her out when she fears the girl is being bullied too much by the other clique members, using Nelly's knowledge to blackmail them into backing off. When Nelly realizes Jenny has no intention of taking over as the new Queen Bee, she reveals she was playing Jenny the whole time to take advantage of a regime change and goes back to the clique. She wins admittance to Yale University over Blair after their long rivalry in the second season. Nelly eventually approves of Jenny becoming Queen at the end of the 2nd season. In Season 5, Nelly, still remaining a student at Yale, is invited to return to tryout to become a bridesmaid at Blair's wedding but doesn't show up because she hates her and is replaced by Charlie instead. In Season 6 episode 2, Nelly Yuki returns as a fashion reporter sent to review Blair's new fashion line. Blair, having bullied Nelly throughout high school, becomes convinced Nelly is working with Poppy Lifton to sabotage her debut and goes to extreme means to stop it only to discover that Nelly just let Blair "implode" as she often does. Nelly also gives Dan advice to stop trying to get into the elite crowd. Nelly later judges Blair's first fashion show, seated next to Serena who assumes Nelly is still one of Blair's minions until the show goes badly, and Nelly writes it up as a disaster. However, she eventually gives a stellar review of Blair's line, contributing to Blair's success in the fashion industry. In Season 6 episode 3, she equivocally displays her affections for Dan at a bar, only to be overlooked for a tall, red-headed woman with whom Dan leaves the bar.

=== Jonathan Whitney ===
Portrayed by Matt Doyle in seasons two, three and four, Jonathan Whitney is Eric's ex-boyfriend and is a member of the prominent Whitney family. In "The Goodbye Gossip Girl", Jonathan was mistakenly identified as "Gossip Girl" when the presiding room was silenced and Serena texted her,"Now I know who you are." It turns out that he had hacked Gossip Girl's website. In season three, Jonathan was absent for a few episodes - he was with his grandparents - when he returned, he and Eric challenged Jenny's authority over the school by sitting higher on "the steps" than her and her cronies, this resulted in Eric being splattered with yogurt. That night, at a party, ("They Shoot Humphreys, Don't They?") Jonathan is egged by Jenny's cronies, angering Eric, who plots to ruin Jenny's Cotillion. But when Jonathan learns of Eric's scheming with Blair, he breaks up with him. In season four, Jonathan tries (unsuccessfully) to reconcile with Eric.

=== Diana Payne ===
Portrayed by Elizabeth Hurley in season five, Diana Payne is a sexy, smart, and manipulative cougar. She first meets Nate Archibald in Los Angeles at a party at her home (while Nate claims the house is his) and end up in bed together. She soon ends up in New York and launches her own online journals: 'The NY Spectator.' We next find out her goal is to take down the infamous blog and media social rumor site in New York - 'Gossip Girl.' Until their secret relationship reaches its breaking point, Nate and Diana find themselves attempting to make each other jealous until Diana decides to go public - via the NY Spectator. Meanwhile, Diana finds out the story of Ivy and Charlie being the same person and forces Charlie to work for her and threatening Ivy Dickens's life. At the end, more shocking twists are revealed as the evil Diana and Nate's crooked grandfather, William van der Bilt, are revealed to have been working together to orchestrate Nate's employment with Diana as part of sinister grand plan for Nate and then she is gone out of town. In episode 19 "It Girl Interrupted" Diana Payne's return to The Spectator starts a power struggle with Nate and Diana meets Nate's new girlfriend, Lola Rhodes. After her return, Lola inadvertently reveals to everyone that Diana is Chuck's biological mother. Trying to find more information about her, Nate finds that Diana Payne may not be her real name.

=== Damien Dalgaard ===
Portrayed by Kevin Zegers in seasons three and four, Damien Dalgaard is a drug dealer and the son of the Belgian ambassador. Later befriends Jenny and uses her as a drug mule and gets her to become a dealer. He begins dating Jenny and wanted to have sex with her, and when she refused he left her. It was revealed in "The Hurt Locket" that he was very intelligent and athletic, and also went to the same boarding school as Serena when she went away. Later on, this is also reaffirmed in "The Townie".

In season 4, Damien tries to help Blair and Dan find Juliet when he finds out that he sold Juliet a large amount of drugs such as cocaine, pills and ether which was used to drug Serena. At one time, he started to sell sleeping pills to Eric. To get revenge on Ben, when the latter has threatened him to stay away from Serena and her family, he befriends Eric and comes up with a scheme to send Ben back to jail, unsuccessfully. As he has used Eric for his intent, he ends his fake friendship with Eric. Dan and Nate, thinking that Eric is in the embassy with Damien, went for him. They did not find them but they have found the ambassador. They told him his son is a drug dealer and he was cut off from his father inheritance. He starts to blackmail Eric with the information he knows about the affidavit Lily forged against Ben. Eric was to deal drugs for Damien, so that the latter could keep a low profile with his father. Damien has acquired a check of $100,000 by Eric. As he exits the Van der Woodsens' building he was stopped and death threatened by Ben to stay away from the Van der Woodsens while gaining the check back.

=== Louis Grimaldi ===
Portrayed by Hugo Becker in seasons four and five, Louis is the nephew of Albert II and the heir to the throne of the principality of Monaco. He meets Blair in Paris at the beginning of season four and begins to fall for her - however, not wanting her to be only interested in him because of his title, he acts as if he is a chauffeur (though Blair later discovers the truth). Blair turns down Louis both to return to Manhattan and because she isn't over Chuck, giving him her shoe so he can find her again. At the end of the season, Louis comes to New York to woo Blair. Blair tells him that she wants a relationship and at first they meet secretly so Louis' mother, Princess Sophie, doesn't discover her son is dating a commoner. Louis asks Blair to marry him after she runs away from a royal event Chuck ruined with his drunken declarations of love, though his mother doesn't think Blair is suited to be a princess of Monaco. Later, with the help of Cyrus, Louis' mother is convinced Blair is worthy enough, and in deference Louis often upholds her wishes over Blair's. Louis, while usually mild-mannered, is intensely paranoid about Blair's previous relationship with Chuck, who often has to cajole him into returning to and trusting her. In Season 5 episode 13, the 100th episode, Louis and Blair's wedding ceremony was interrupted by an explosive Gossip Girl blast, a video of Blair professing her undying love for Chuck, not Louis. Afterwards, Louis forgives Blair and continues the ceremony. However, at the reception, Louis reveals to Blair that the wedding stands as a contract and "a show", but that their love does not exist.

=== Juliet Sharp ===
Portrayed by Katie Cassidy in season four, Juliet Sharp is an intriguing woman that Nate first met in a bar while he's on a date with one of the girls of Chuck's little black book. She knows much more about the gang than what she lets on, and she's the one who advises Vanessa to get back together with Dan, so that Nate can get Serena back. At the end of the third episode, she meets a man in prison, Ben, who is later found out to be her brother. When Nate begins to suspect Juliet's strange behaviour and busy schedule, he asks her to tell him more about her life. She takes him to what appears to be her apartment, but while Nate goes to see the place, she hands some cash to a man who tells that the real owners of the apartment will be back in the next day. Her glamorous, impenetrable façade and dismissive approach to love actually hides a sensitive, caring nature and as the season progresses, she declares to having genuine feelings for Nate. But after her brother attacks Nate's father in jail for Juliet's attempt at forgoing their plans, she calls Nate, and ends their relationship for the sake of Howard's safety. After she hangs up, Serena's professor Colin then enters the room and hands Juliet a cheque, thus making us believe that he is in on her plan to sabotage Serena. We later learn that he is in fact her cousin, and that the cheque was to cover her rent and school fees, he has no idea of her and her brother's plans for Serena. Juliet, Vanessa, and Jenny come together to strike a savage blow against Serena, landing her a place at the Ostroff Center for recovery. Juliet proceeds to blackmail Lily for a monthly cheque by telling that she will reveal one of Serena's other dirty secrets if she does not provide her with cash. To avoid the wrath of Blair and others, Juliet leaves to return to her home town. A while later, Juliet sees Damien, Dan, and Blair getting into a car together, making her assume that they know all about what she's done and bringing her back to Manhattan to tell Serena everything. Serena and Juliet make peace when Juliet finds out that it was really Lily who signed the document that caused her brother sentenced five years in prison. Before she departs for her home town once more, Juliet promises not to cause harm to Serena or anyone else again. However, this does not convince Nate, who rebukes her. This hurts Juliet immensely as she leaves.

=== Ben Donovan ===
Portrayed by David Call in season four, Ben Donovan is Juliet's brother who was in jail. He was Serena's English teacher for a brief time, and having spent some time together they both developed mutual feelings. When Serena returned to Manhattan, Ben was charged with statutory rape and transporting a minor across state lines. A crime of which was signed off by with Serena's very own signature. This caused him to be forced into serving a five-year sentence for a crime that he did not commit. He and Juliet devised a plot to destroy Serena's life permanently, however with no real intent on hurting her physically. In the end it was revealed that Lily, Serena's mother, had him put in jail by faking her daughter's signature so that Serena could return to Constance,

Serena visits Ben to explain everything and to successfully attempt a reconciliation. Ben and Serena started to hang out, later developing into a couple. He has threatened Damien to stay away from the Van Der Woodsens twice, the second being a death threat.

=== Russell Thorpe ===
Portrayed by Michael Boatman in season four, Russell Thorpe was a longtime friend of Bart Bass who started in the real estate market around the same time together. After Bart stole most of his deals and wrecked many of his business plans, Thorpe essentially was run out of town and went to Chicago to build his own empire there. Russell and his daughter Raina returned to the Upper East Side in The Kids Are Not Alright to shake things up for the reigning families and buy Bass Industries. Moreover, he and Lily also shared a sexual past, although she states that it was a very long time ago. He is against the relationship between Raina and Chuck. Later he reveals to Chuck why he wanted to ruin Bass Industries and tells him that Bart Bass killed his wife Avery Thorpe in a fire at one of Barts buildings that was set by Bart himself. In the final episodes of season 4 Chuck discovers that Avery had an affair with his father and that she wrote him a breakup letter which leads Chuck to think that this could be the reason why he wanted her dead. After Russell calls Jack Bass with the intention of ruining Chuck, Chuck, Nate and Jack trick Russell and catch him while stealing one of the videos from the security cameras from the day of the fire. With the help of the video Chuck discovers that not Bart but it was Russell set the fire. Russell than tells them the whole truth and that is that the breakup letter wasn't meant for Bart, but for Russell. Russell didn't know that Avery was in the building and thought that Bart was the only one in it. After the fire he made a deal with Bart and that was that he would flee to Chicago if Bart takes the fault in the fire and never mentions Avery again.

=== Raina Thorpe ===
Portrayed by Tika Sumpter in season four, Raina Thorpe is Russell Thorpe's savvy and candid daughter who also assists her father in his business dealings. Chuck Bass first meets her and assumes that she is his assistant, to which she says that she prefers the term secretary. Later, he finds out that she is in fact his daughter and the vice-president of her father's company. She is involved with her father in buying Bass Industries and later admits to Chuck that it was Russell who tipped off a potential buyer so they could acquire it. She also offers to sleep with Chuck, who takes her up on the offer at the end of "The Kids Are Not Alright". They have a short sexual relationship which ends when Chuck is told by Russell that Bart Bass was responsible for the death of Raina's mother, Avery. He explained that Bart was having an affair with Avery over twenty years ago, and that Bart purposefully trapped her in an apartment fire when she decided to go back to Russell. He tells Chuck that he has led Raina to believe that her mother abandoned them when she was a baby, so she doesn't know about her death. "In Damien Darko", Chuck asks Raina to get Nate's father fired after finding out that he is working for Russell Thorpe. She later develops a romantic relationship with Nate, who tells her the truth about her mother. She tells Russell she wants nothing to do with him, but later helps Blair and Chuck when it's discovered that he was responsible for killing her mother.

== Guest stars ==
Reed Birney portrays Mr. Prescott in seasons one and two, a teacher at Constance Billard and St. Judes. Jill Flint portrays Bex Simon in seasons one and two, Lily's art dealer and a minor love interest for Rufus. Alison Humphrey, Rufus' ex-wife and Dan and Jenny's mother is portrayed in season one by Susie Misner. Mädchen Amick portrays Duchess Catherine Beaton in the second season. She has a short affair with Nate. Her stepson, Lord Marcus Beaton is portrayed by Patrick Heusinger in season two. He has a relationship with Blair. At first he pretends to be a college student called James, but when Blair thinks he is boring, he tells her the truth. When Blair finds out that he is having an affair with his stepmother, she blackmails them into leaving the country. Tamara Feldman portrayed Poppy Lifton in the second and sixth seasons, a friend of Serena's. Her boyfriend, Gabriel Edwards, is portrayed by Armie Hammer in the second season. When Serena comes back from a holiday in Spain with Poppy and Gabriel, she starts a relationship with him. However Poppy and Gabriel are actually still together and use Serena to steal money from Lily. John Patrick Amedori portrays Aaron Rose in season two, an artist who becomes a love interest for Serena. However she leaves him when she realizes she still likes Dan. Willa Holland portrays Agnes Andrews in season two and for one episode in season three. She is a model that befriends Jenny, however when the two become business partners, things go wrong and they become enemies. Andrew Tyler, a detective that works for Bart and Chuck, is portrayed by Kevin Stapleton in seasons two and four. Aaron Schwartz portrays Vanya in seasons two, three and four, the doorman at the building of Lily's apartment, who later marries Dorota. He and Dorota have a daughter in season three and a son in season five. Laura Breckenridge plays Rachel Carr, Dan's romantic love interest and his teacher in Season-2

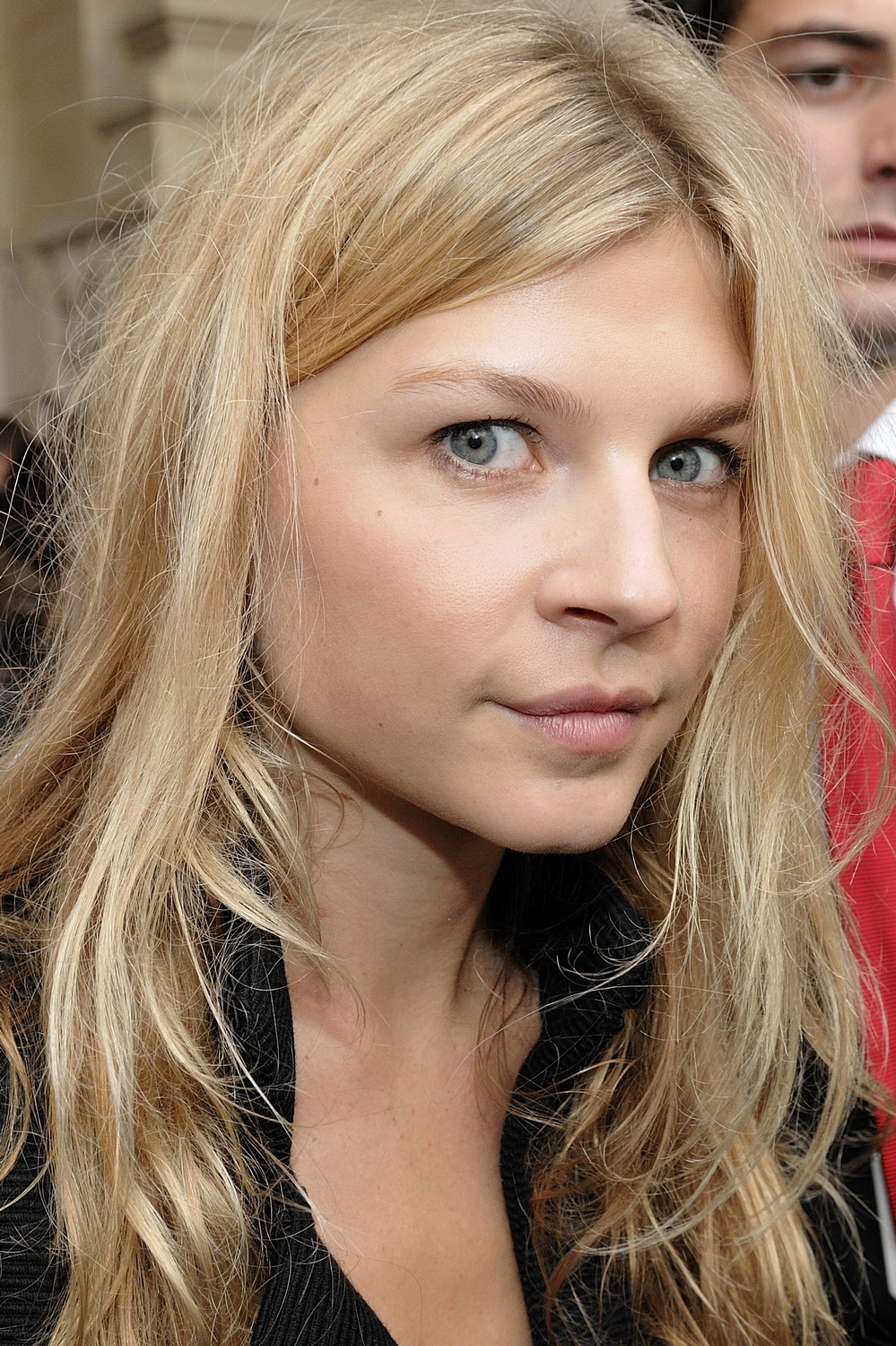
Clémence Poésy portrayed Eva Coupeau in season four.

Joanna Garcia portrays Bree Buckley in the first four episodes of season three. Her and Nate's families are rivals and they begin a "Romeo and Juliet" kind of relationship. When she finds out that her cousin is left at the altar at her wedding to Carter Baizen, she tries to get revenge on him for her family, which leads to her and Nate's break-up. Olivia Burke is portrayed by Hilary Duff in season three. She is a famous movie star that starts a relationship with Dan. They break up when she realizes Dan has feelings for Vanessa. Deanna Russo portrays K.C. Cunningham, Olivia Burke's publicist and Serena's former boss, in season three and for one episode in season four. Laura Harring portrays Elizabeth Fisher in season three. She's Chuck's mother, who was thought to have died when giving birth to Chuck. She reveals to Chuck that she left when he was born, because she was nineteen and had no intentions of marrying Bart. Bart later paid her to stay away from their son. She also dated Chuck's uncle Jack in the past, who she gave Chuck's company to after he had given it to her. Sherri Saum portrays Holland Kemble in season three. She is hired by William van der Woodsen to seduce Rufus in order to break up him and Lily. Luke Kleintank portrays Elliot Leichter, Eric's bisexual love interest, in seasons three and four. Jessica, portrayed by Alice Callahan in seasons three, four and five, is one of Blair's new minions at Columbia.

Clémence Poésy portrays Eva Coupeau in the first four episodes of season four. She saved Chuck from dying when he was shot in Prague. They start a relationship and she changes Chuck into a better more philanthropic person. When Blair tries to break them up, she finds out that Eva was a prostitute, but Chuck forgives Eva for not telling him and dedicates a charity in Eva's name. However Eva dumps Chuck when, after all the good things she has done for him, Chuck is still duped by one of Blair's devious schemes into thinking Eva was only using him. Chuck realizes the error only too late as Eva, heartbroken at Chuck's distrust, flies back to France. Dean Reuther, the dean of Columbia, is portrayed by Jayne Atkinson in season four. Samuel Page portrays Colin Forrester in season four, Juliet's cousin and Serena's college teacher, who she has a short relationship with. Carol Rhodes, portrayed by Sheila Kelley in seasons four and five, is Lily's sister who comes to New York with Ivy, who pretends to be her daughter Charlie, in order to get access to Charlie's trust fund. Brian J. Smith portrays Max Harding in season five, Ivy's ex-boyfriend, who finds out that she is pretending to be someone else and blackmails her. Jane, portrayed by Michael Michele in season five, is a movie producer that hires Serena, but she soon quits. Marina Squerciati portrays Alessandra Steele in season five, a publicist that publishes Dan's book.

During season five, Roxane Mesquida portrays Béatrice Grimaldi, Louis' sister who doesn't approve of her brother's interest in Blair. Marc Menard portrays Father Cavalia, a priest from Monaco with ties to Blair’s fiancé, Louis. Amanda Perez as Tina, Nate's assistant at The Spectator.

== Cameo appearances ==
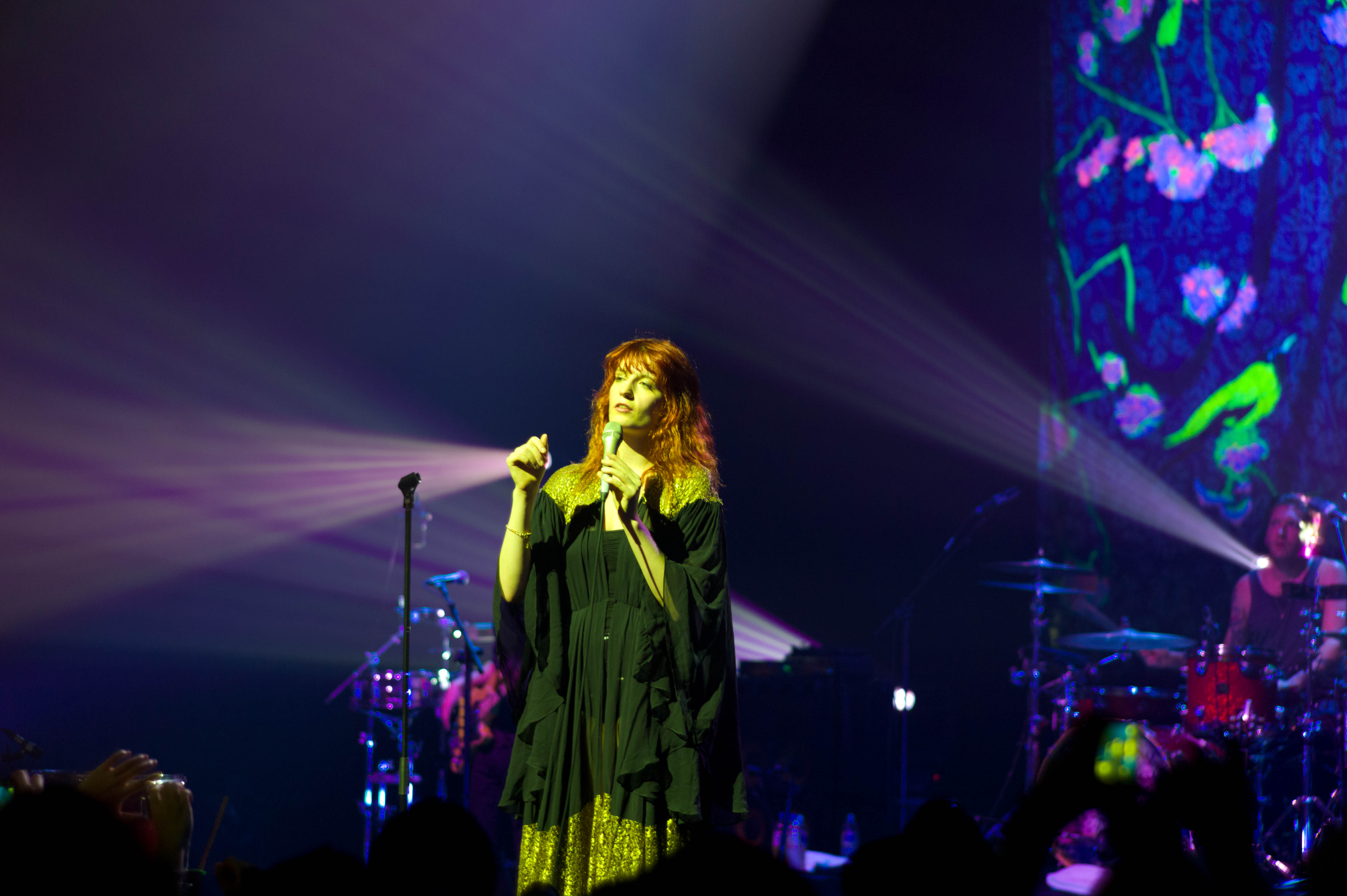
Florence and the Machine performing "Cosmic Love" on the series

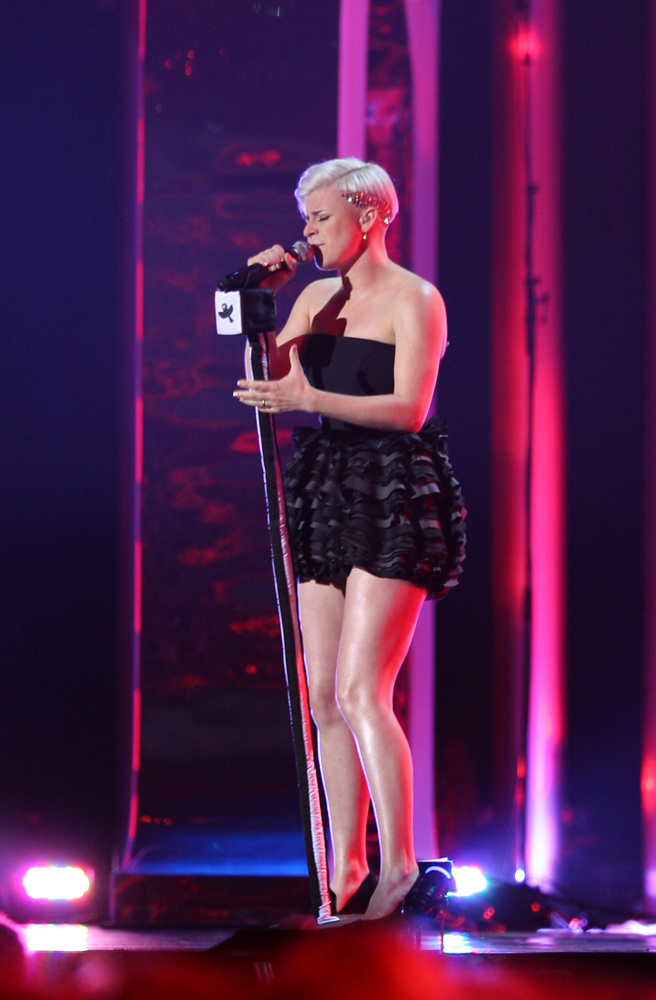
Robyn performing "Hang With Me" on the series

- The Pierces ("Hi, Society")
- Lisa Loeb ("Woman on the Verge", "New York, I Love You XOXO")
- Sylvia Weinstock ("Woman on the Verge", "Rhodes to Perdition")
- Ebony J Lewis ("Much 'I Do' About Nothing")
- Tinsley Mortimer ("Summer Kind of Wonderful", "The Serena Also Rises")
- Cristina Greeven Cuomo ("The Serena Also Rises")
- Michael Kors ("The Serena Also Rises")
- Christian Coulson ("Touch of Eva")
- Honor Brodie ("Chuck in Real Life")
- Ariel Foxman ("Chuck in Real Life")
- Cyndi Lauper ("Bonfire of the Vanity")
- Nastia Liukin ("It's a Wonderful Lie")
- Jennifer Damiano ("It's a Wonderful Lie")
- Charles Isherwood ("The Age of Dissonance")
- Patrick McMullan ("Remains of the J")
- Ashley Hinshaw ("Reversals of Fortune")
- Nacho Figueras ("Reversals of Fortune")
- Alexandra Richards ("Reversals of Fortune")
- Sean MacPherson ("The Lost Boy")
- Tory Burch ("Dan de Fleurette")
- Tyra Banks ("Dan de Fleurette")
- Georgina Chapman ("Dan de Fleurette")
- Kim Gordon ("Rufus Getting Married")
- Jimmy Fallon ("The Grandfather: Part II")
- Plastiscines ("They Shoot Humphreys, Don't They?")
- Lady Gaga ("The Last Days of Disco Stick")
- Alexandra Carl ("The Hurt Locket")
- Deadmau5 ("The Empire Strikes Jack")
- Lou Doillon ("Belles de Jour")
- Karlie Kloss ("Belles de Jour")
- Willy Wong ("Belles de Jour")
- Danielle Billinkoff ("Belles de Jour")
- Meredith Melling Burke ("Belles de Jour")
- Hamish Bowles ("The Undergraduates")
- Charlotte Ronson ("The Undergraduates")
- Diane von Fürstenberg ("The Undergraduates")
- Alessandra Ambrosio ("The Undergraduates")
- Kick Kennedy ("Touch of Eva")
- Tim Gunn ("Easy J")
- Jared Kushner ("Easy J")
- Isaac Mizrahi ("Easy J")
- Ivanka Trump ("Easy J")
- Cynthia Rowley ("War at the Roses")
- Joe Zee ("War at the Roses")
- Rachel Zoe ("War at the Roses")
- Robyn ("War at the Roses")
- Darci Kistler ("Juliet Doesn't Live Here Anymore")
- Peter Martins ("Juliet Doesn't Live Here Anymore")
- Gillian Murphy ("Juliet Doesn't Live Here Anymore")
- Ethan Stiefel ("Juliet Doesn't Live Here Anymore")
- John DeLucie ("The Witches of Bushwick")
- Minnie Mortimer ("The Townie")
- Stefano Tonchi ("Damien Darko")
- Robert Ackroyd ("Panic Roommate")
- Florence and the Machine ("Panic Roommate")
- Cecily von Ziegesar ("The Wrong Goodbye")
- David O. Russell ("The Wrong Goodbye")
- Zoë Bell ("Yes, Then Zero")
- Jenny Lewis ("Yes, Then Zero")
- Johnathan Rice ("Yes, Then Zero")
- Sloane Crosley ("Memoirs of an Invisible Dan")
- Elizabeth Quinn Brown ("Rhodes to Perdition")
- Matthew Lynch ("Riding in Town Cars with Boys")
- Vera Wang ("The End of the Affair")
- Dick Cavett ("Con-Heir")
- Kristen Bell ("New York, I Love You XOXO")
- Rachel Bilson ("New York, I Love You XOXO")
- Michael Bloomberg ("New York, I Love You XOXO")
- Jonathan Karp ("Simon and Schuster- Dan's publisher")
