= Morgan Lily =

American actress and model

- Occupations: Actress, Model
- Years active: 2004–present
- Website: morganlily.com

Morgan Lily is an American actress and fashion model. She started modeling internationally at the age of four years and appeared in more than twenty television commercials and many photoshoots before her role in Henry Poole Is Here as Millie Stupek. Lily had supporting roles in He's Just Not That Into You, and as Matthew Gray Gubler's daughter in Beautiful Girl. Her most notable role has been as Lilly Curtis in the apocalyptic film 2012. She acted as young Julianna Baker in the film Flipped based on the novel with the same name by Wendelin van Draanen and as young Raven Darkhölme in X-Men: First Class. Lily co-starred as Missy in the Hallmark Channel's film Love's Everlasting Courage. Lily's later work includes Joe Bell, where she starred alongside Mark Wahlberg.

== Career ==
Lily began her acting career at an early age. Her early work includes the 2005 drama film Shards where she played Morgan, and a TV movie, Welcome to the Jungle Gym (2006) where she played Kylie. In 2007, she guest-starred in CSI: Crime Scene Investigation as Chloe, which led her to more opportunities such as a co-starring role at the age of 8 years. In her first theatrical film Henry Poole Is Here she portrayed Millie Stupek. Morgan's most notable role so far has been in the 2009 disaster film 2012 as Lilly Curtis alongside young actor Liam James. She has also recurred as Bonnie on Shameless. Morgan's current projects up-to-date include Love's Everlasting Courage alongside high-profile actors Wes Brown and Cheryl Ladd.

== Filmography ==
=== Film ===
Year	Title	Role	Notes
2005	Shards	Morgan	
2008	Henry Poole Is Here	Millie Stupek	
2009	2012	Lilly Curtis	
2009	He's Just Not That Into You	Young Gigi	
2010	Flipped	Young Juli	
2011	X-Men: First Class	Young Raven Darkhölme	
2013	Sticks and Stones	Alice	Short film
2014	Beautiful Girl	Bethany	
2014	Cooties	Tamra	
2018	Juveniles	Corie	
2020	Joe Bell	Marcie	

=== Television ===
Year	Title	Role	Notes
2006	Welcome to the Jungle Gym	Kylie	TV movie
2007	CSI: Crime Scene Investigation	Chloe	Episode: "Living Doll"
2009	Curb Your Enthusiasm	Kid #1	Episode: "Officer Krupke"
2009	The Bonnie Hunt Show	Herself	
2010	Criminal Minds	Jody Hatchett	Episode: "Solitary Man"
2011	Love's Everlasting Courage	Missie	TV movie
2013	Piper's QUICK Picks	Herself	Guest
2013	Deadtime Stories	Chris Parker	Episode: "The Beast of Baskerville"
2014	Shameless	Bonnie	4 episodes
2016	Grey's Anatomy	Jennifer Parker	2 episodes
2017	Chicago Med	Nancy Leigh	Episode: "Prisoner's Dilemma"
2017–2018	Claws	Marnie	Recurring role; 8 episodes

== Awards ==
Award	Year	Category	Nominated work	Result
Young Artist Award	2011	Best Performance in a TV Movie, Miniseries or Special - Leading Young Actress	Love's Everlasting Courage	Nominated
