= Marcy Harriell =

American actress and singer

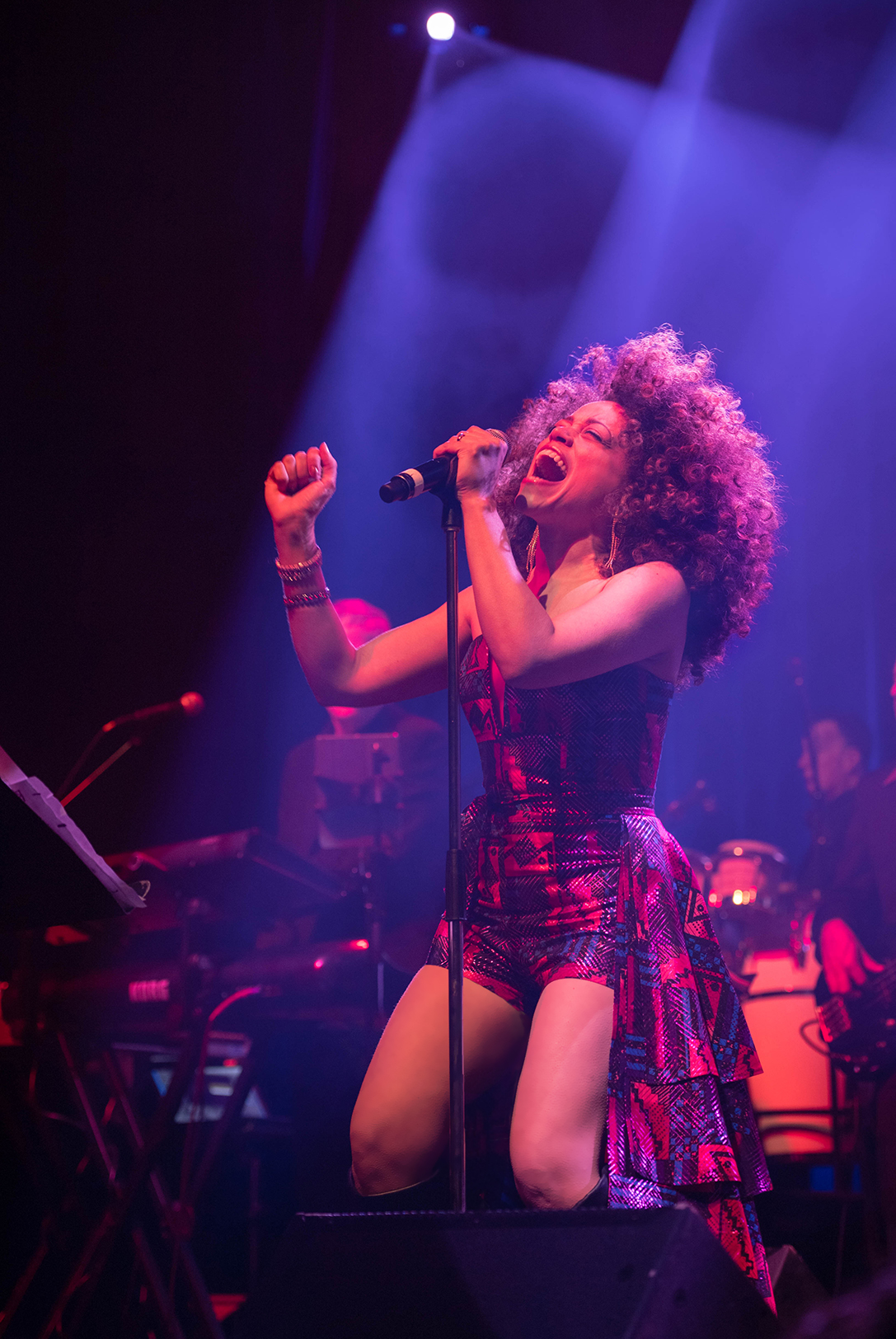
- Harriell at Montclair Film Festival 2019
- Occupations: Actress; singer; show host; fashion designer; writer
- Years active: 1994–present
- Spouse: Robert Harriell
- Website: marcyharriell.com

Marcy Harriell is an American actress, singer and writer. She is best known for her appearances on Broadway, starring in the Tony Award winning musicals In the Heights and Rent, and as the host of the fashion series Re:Fashion on TN Marketing's Craftsy.

== Career ==
After starring as Maria in the 1996 National tour of West Side Story, Harriell made her Broadway debut on April 4, 1997 (after only 4 days of rehearsal) as Mimi in the Pulitzer Prize winning musical, Rent, starring opposite Adam Pascal. She went on to star in the Broadway musical Lennon, featuring the music of former Beatle, John Lennon; written and directed by Don Scardino. On November 11, 2008, she joined the cast of the 2008 Tony Award winning musical In The Heights, starring as Vanessa, opposite Lin-Manuel Miranda.

On television, Harriell has been a Series Regular on NBC's Ed, Showtime's Nurse Jackie and the CBS courtroom dramedy Queens Supreme. She has been a guest star on numerous television programs, including: NCIS, Law & Order, Elementary, Royal Pains, Beauty & the Beast, Gone and Search Party.

In 2006, Harriell auditioned for the Quentin Tarantino film Death Proof (part of the double feature Grindhouse). Mr. Tarantino was so intrigued by Harriell's "southern boy" characterization, that he rewrote the part specifically for her and renamed the character Marcy.

In December 2013, Lin-Manuel Miranda recruited Harriell to help him record demos of his songs for the Disney animated motion picture, Moana. Harriell's outtakes of the songs "More" and "More (Reprise)" were included on the soundtrack.

Harriell plays Molly's mother in the 2019 motion picture Men in Black: International.

In 2022, Harriell was tapped as star vocalist by Mark Morris in his latest evening-length piece "The Look of Love" based on the classic Burt Bacharach, Hal David, Dionne Warwick hit songs. Premiering on the east coast at John F. Kennedy Center for the Performing Arts, The Washington Post noted “Performed by luminous chanteuse Marcy Harriell … Harriell’s voice reaches theater-filling force … Harriell ranges masterfully from hushed intimacy to a desperate, raging plea, making you feel the destruction of a soul.”

Among her many singing engagements, Harriell is a regular with the tribute project Loser's Lounge, created by Joe McGinty. With The Losers, Harriell has performed at The Public Theater, City Winery, Lincoln Center and the Montclair Film Festival.

Harriell is well known in the online sewing community through her popular blog oonaballoona, where she showcases her fashion designs and handmade wardrobe. She is the host of Re:Fashion, a show about sewing and fashion on TN Marketing's Craftsy. She has been a featured writer for magazines threads and Mollie Makes. In 2018, she was a guest on the Canadian sewing podcast Love To Sew where she talked about developing her confidence as a sewist.

== Personal life ==
Harriell has been married to actor/writer/entrepreneur Robert Harriell since 1995.

== Stage performances ==
Sources: Playbill IBDB Broadway World

Year	Title	Role	Theater	Notes
1994-95	Blood Brothers	Linda	multiple	U.S. Tour
1995-96	West Side Story	Maria	multiple	U.S. Tour
1997-99	Rent	Mimi Márquez	Nederlander Theatre	Broadway
2001	Sorrows and Rejoicings	Rebecca	Second Stage Theater	Off-Broadway - Created Role
2002	Company	Marta	Kennedy Center	Stephen Sondheim Celebration
2002	A Sondheim Celebration	Marta	Lincoln Center	Outtakes from Company
2003	Little Fish	Kathy	Second Stage Theater	Off-Broadway
2004	Lucky Duck	Serena	Old Globe Theatre	Created role
2005	Lennon	Elton John, etc.	Broadhurst Theatre	Broadway
2006	Getting Home	Jan	Second Stage Theater	Off-Broadway - Created role
2006	Kismet	Marsinah	Encores!	Off-Broadway
2008	Was	Angel	Lincoln Center	Off-Broadway
2008-11	In the Heights	Vanessa	Richard Rodgers Theatre	Broadway
2019	Promenade	Miss U	Encores!	Off-Broadway
2022	The Look of Love	Star Vocalist	Kennedy Center	World Tour
2023	The Untitled Unauthorized Hunter S. Thompson Musical	Sandy	La Jolla Playhouse	Regional

== Television performances ==
Sources: TV Guide TV.com

Year	Title	Role	Notes
1997	Law & Order	Josette Vega	Guest Star
2002-03	Queens Supreme	Carmen Hui	Series Regular
2003-04	Ed	Jennifer Young	Series Regular
2007	NCIS	Carly Marcano	Guest Star
2009	Legally Mad	Paige	unaired pilot
2011	Royal Pains	Betty	Guest Star
2013	Nurse Jackie	Marta	Series Regular
2015	Elementary	Yolanda Massee	Guest Star
2015	Beauty & the Beast	ER Head Nurse	Guest Star
2016	Search Party	Casey	Guest Star
2017	Gone	Karen Garcia	Guest Star
2018-19	Re:Fashion	Herself	Star/Host (Best Instructional Video - 2019 Cynopsis Awards)

== Film performances ==
Sources: TV Guide

Year	Title	Role	Notes
2007	Death Proof	Marcy	
2007	Freezer Burn	Suzie	
2012	First Kiss	Lover	
2015	Touched with Fire	Elise	Produced by Spike Lee
2016	Moana	Moana	Outtake of More
2019	Men in Black: International	Molly's Mom	
2022	Burst The Silence	Chantelle	
