= Robert Harriell =

American writer, actor and entrepreneur

- Born: Fayetteville, Arkansas, U.S.
- Occupations: Writer; actor; entrepreneur
- Years active: 1999–present
- Spouse: Marcy Harriell (m. 1995)
- Website: robertharriell.com

Robert Harriell is an American writer, actor and entrepreneur. He is best known for his starring roles in the independent films Freezer Burn and The Final Equation, and for appearing alongside his wife, Marcy Harriell, in the fashion entertainment series Re:Fashion on NBCUniversal's Bluprint. He is also the co-founder of the Slammin' Sauce food brand, rude RED.

== Career ==
Harriell made his professional acting debut in 1993 in The Repertory Theatre of St. Louis production of Six Degrees of Separation. Shortly thereafter, he joined his soon-to-be wife, Marcy Harriell in New York, where he went on to perform in numerous Off-Broadway and Off-Off-Broadway productions, along with multiple film & TV roles. He also helped found and was Co-Artistic Director of Blue Sphere East theatre company with actors Christian Campbell and Kim Tobin.

== Rude Red ==
In the late 1990s, Harriell started making his own BBQ sauce, because "I couldn't find anything off the shelf that I liked." In 2016, his best friend from childhood, Chris Dill, tried Rude Red for the first time and was shocked at how different the sauce was from anything he had ever tasted. Dill (a professional chef) convinced Harriell that the sauce was marketable. In 2017, Harriell and Dill incorporated Rude Red LLC and began selling to the public. Recently a second hotter version, Really Rude Red, was launched, and both can be found in Hannaford supermarket chains across New England, and exclusively in New York at Westerly Natural Market.

== Personal life ==
Harriell has been married to actress/singer/writer/show host Marcy Harriell since 1995.

== Filmography ==
Sources: IMDb

- Lord Of The City (1997) - Bobby
- Floating (1997) - Steve
- Celebrity (1998) - Elaine's Book Party Guest
- A Fish in the Bathtub (1998) - Barfly
- Law & Order (2001) - Mark Lawford (1 episode)
- Stuart Little 2 (2002) - Blader
- Frank Bidart, The Maker (2004) - Reader (1 episode)
- Price (2005) Stuart
- Traveler (2005) - The Specialist
- The Orange Bow (2005) - Officer
- Call Me In The Morning (2006)
- Freezer Burn (2007) - Virgil Stamp (Park City Film Music Festival)
- Night Falls Fast (2007) - Vale Trueman (writer) (Nashville Film Festival)
- The Final Equation (2009) - Jack (Philip K Dick Film Festival)
- First Kiss (2012) - Lover
- Re:Fashion (2018–19) - Himself (11 episodes) (writer) (Best Instructional Video - 2019 Cynopsis Awards)
