= Get Big =

Get Big may refer to:

- Get Big (album), 2010 album by Dorrough
- Get Big (film), 2017 American film
