= Flipped (2010 film) =

2010 film by Rob Reiner

- Theatrical release poster
- Directed by: Rob Reiner
- Screenplay by: Rob Reiner; Andrew Scheinman
- Based on: Flipped by Wendelin Van Draanen
- Produced by: Rob Reiner; Alan Greisman
- Starring: Madeline Carroll; Callan McAuliffe; Rebecca De Mornay; Anthony Edwards; John Mahoney; Penelope Ann Miller; Aidan Quinn; Kevin Weisman
- Cinematography: Thomas Del Ruth
- Edited by: Robert Leighton
- Music by: Marc Shaiman
- Production companies: Castle Rock Entertainment; Reiner/Greisman Productions
- Distributed by: Warner Bros. Pictures
- Release date: September 10, 2010
- Running time: 90 minutes
- Country: United States
- Language: English
- Budget: $14 million
- Box office: $4.3 million

Flipped is a 2010 American romantic comedy-drama film co-written and directed by Rob Reiner, and based on Wendelin Van Draanen's 2001 novel of the same name. Starring Callan McAuliffe, Madeline Carroll, Rebecca De Mornay, Anthony Edwards, John Mahoney, Penelope Ann Miller, Aidan Quinn, and Kevin Weisman.

The film tells the story of Juli and Bryce, neighbors since the second grade who are never on the same page with their feelings until six years later (just when she is about to give up) they both start to have feelings for each other, despite being total opposites.

Flipped was released in theaters in the United States on August 6, 2010, by Warner Bros. Pictures. It garnered lukewarm reviews from critics and grossed $4.3 million against a $14 million budget. It has since garnered a greater appreciation for its realistic portrayal of teenagers and a wider viewership via home video and streaming services, so much so that it is now considered a cult favorite.

== Plot ==
In 1957, 7-year-old Bryce Loski moves in next door to Julianna "Juli" Baker. Looking into each other's eyes, Juli knows that it is love, but Bryce is unsettled and avoids her.

Four years later, Juli is still enamored, rarely leaving Bryce alone. Desperate to get rid of her, he pretends to date Sherry Stalls, a popular girl Juli dislikes. Bryce's best friend Garrett tells Sherry the truth, so she dumps him. Embarrassed, Bryce hopes that in the upcoming seventh grade, Juli will finally meet someone else.

The following year, Bryce's grandfather Chet Duncan moves in. Juli adores an old sycamore tree in their neighborhood, so when one day they start to cut it down, she tries to protect it by climbing it, refusing to come down. After much attention from the town, her father Richard talks her down and it is removed. Juli is inconsolable until he gives her a painting of it, which calms her. An article is printed about it in the local paper, which Chet shows Bryce in an attempt to get him to open up his mind. Bryce is not convinced.

Using chicks from her school science fair project, Juli starts raising hens in her backyard. She sells their eggs to her neighbors but gives them to the Loskis as a kind gesture. She is hurt upon discovering Bryce has been throwing them away because his father fears the eggs' quality. When Bryce uses the Bakers' poorly cared for yard as an excuse, Juli gets embarrassed, so she decides to fix it up.

Chet helps Juli with her yard work upon seeing her out working, and they develop a good friendship. When Bryce's father, Steven, criticizes the Bakers' seeming lack of pride in their property, Chet defends them, pointing out that they rent and the landlord should be the one who takes care of it. Additionally, most of their finances go into caring for Juli's mentally disabled uncle Daniel.

Encouraged to broaden her mind by Chet, Juli starts to question if she actually likes Bryce. Afterward, Juli is told by a classmate that he has been admiring her, but she overhears him seemingly agreeing with Garrett as he makes fun of her and Daniel, causing Juli to lose interest. Unbeknownst to her, Bryce is disgusted with Garrett's attitude and distances himself from him, but they remain friendly.

Feeling bad about their apathy towards the Bakers, Bryce's mother Patsy invites them over for a family dinner. Juli confronts Bryce privately and reveals she overheard him, calling him a coward. After dinner, however, Juli apologizes to Bryce for her behavior, but he realizes now she feels indifferent to him, leaving Bryce hurt and thinking more about Juli as a person, not the way she had always acted around him.

As the annual school basket boy auction charity event approaches, Bryce discovers he has been selected as a basket boy so will be auctioned off to the other students along with a homemade lunch. He hears a rumor that Sherry and another girl are going to bid for him but he does not care. Instead, he focuses on Juli, who has her egg money with her, but she bids on the rejected boy Eddie Trulock instead of Bryce. Sherry wins Bryce.

During the lunch, Bryce is uninterested in Sherry's conversation and instead watches Juli with Eddie. Finally realizing his feelings for her, he gets up and tries to kiss her in front of everyone, but she flees, humiliated. Bryce runs after her, and Garrett confronts him for abandoning the prettiest girl in school. When he makes fun of Juli, Bryce ends their friendship. He tries to talk to her and explain, going to great lengths to try and contact her but she will not see or speak to him.

Two days later, with Richard's permission, Bryce plants a sapling sycamore tree in their front yard to show her how he truly feels. When she sees this, she joins him and realizes that after all these years, they had never really talked. As they plant the tree, their hands touch, they look into each other's eyes and smile.

== Cast ==
- Madeline Carroll as Julianna "Juli" Baker
  - Morgan Lily as young Juli
- Callan McAuliffe as Bryce Loski
  - Ryan Ketzner as young Bryce
- Rebecca De Mornay as Patsy Loski
- Anthony Edwards as Steven Loski
- John Mahoney as Chet Duncan. This was Mahoney's final film before his death in 2018.
- Penelope Ann Miller as Trina Baker
- Aidan Quinn as Richard Baker
- Kevin Weisman as Daniel Baker
- Cody Horn as Lynetta Loski
  - Gillian Pfaff as young Lynetta
- Shane Harper as Matt Baker
- Michael Christopher Bolten as Mark Baker
- Stefanie Scott as Dana Tressler
- Israel Broussard as Garrett Einbinder
- Ashley Taylor as Sherry Stalls
- Matthew Gold as Eddie Trulock
- Jake Reiner as Skylers
- Ruth Crawford as Mrs. Steuby

== Closing credits ==
The last line of the closing credits says: "Inspired by Nick Reiner", Rob Reiner's son. Nick was 16 years old when the film was made.

== Reception ==
Flipped has received lukewarm reviews. On review aggregator Rotten Tomatoes, the film has garnered a 54% approval rating based on 76 reviews, with an average rating of 6/10. The consensus reads: "While not without its nostalgic charms, Rob Reiner's sometimes awkward adaptation of Wendelin Van Draanen's childhood novel doesn't reach the heights of the director's earlier work like Stand By Me." On Metacritic, the film holds a rating of 45 out of 100, indicating "mixed or average" reviews.

== Home media ==
Flipped was released on DVD and Blu-ray on November 23, 2010.

== Soundtrack ==
1. "Pretty Little Angel Eyes” – Curtis Lee
2. "One Fine Day" – The Chiffons
3. "He's So Fine" – The Chiffons
4. "Chantilly Lace" – Big Bopper
5. "There Goes My Baby" – The Drifters
6. "You've Really Got a Hold on Me" – The Miracles
7. "Devoted to You" – The Everly Brothers
8. "A Teenager in Love" – Dion and the Belmonts
9. "When" – The Kalin Twins
10. "Let It Be Me" – Phil Everly
11. "What's Your Name" – Rob Reiner, Michael Christopher Bolten, and Shane Harper [Org: Don & Juan]
12. "Flipped Suite" – Marc Shaiman
