= Callan McAuliffe =

Australian actor (born 1994 or 1995)

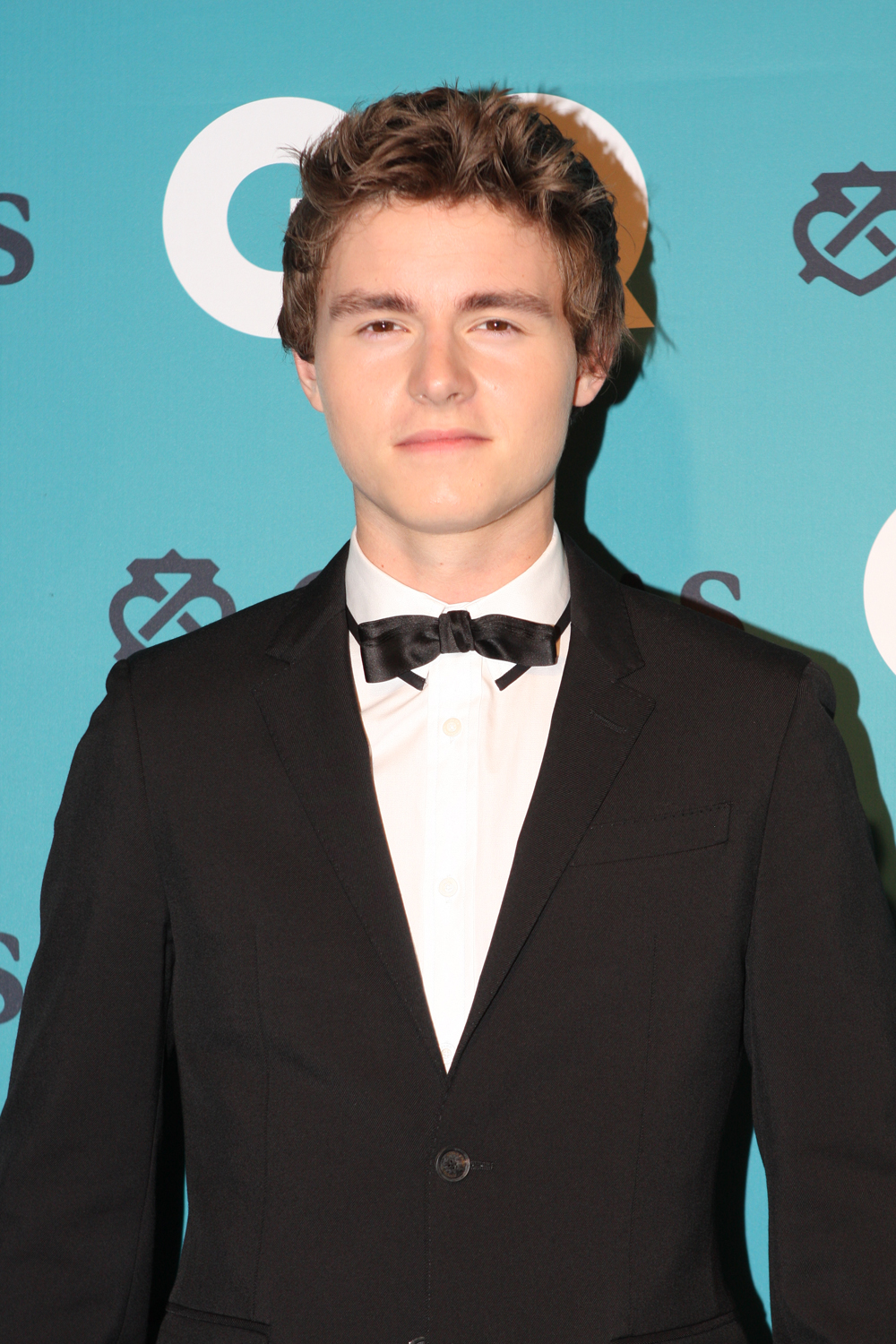
- McAuliffe in November 2012
- Born: Callan Ryan Claude McAuliffe; 24 January 1995 (age 31); Sydney, New South Wales, Australia
- Occupation: Actor
- Years active: 2004–present

Callan Ryan Claude McAuliffe (born 1995) is an Australian actor. He is known for his roles as Bryce Loski in Flipped and Sam Goode in I Am Number Four. He appeared as young Jay Gatsby in the 2013 film The Great Gatsby. From 2017 to 2022 he starred on The Walking Dead as Alden.

== Early life and education ==
Callan Ryan Claude McAuliffe is a native of the Sydney suburb of Clontarf. Born in 1995, he is the son of Claudia Keech and author and journalist Roger McAuliffe. His cousin is actress Jacinta John. Two of his grandparents were Irish.

McAuliffe attended Scots College, an all-boys school in Bellevue Hill. He was the head chorister at the school and topped the London Trinity musical theatre exams, scoring a high distinction in 2008. He was a track athlete until he was injured, leading to a stronger focus on the performing arts.

== Career ==
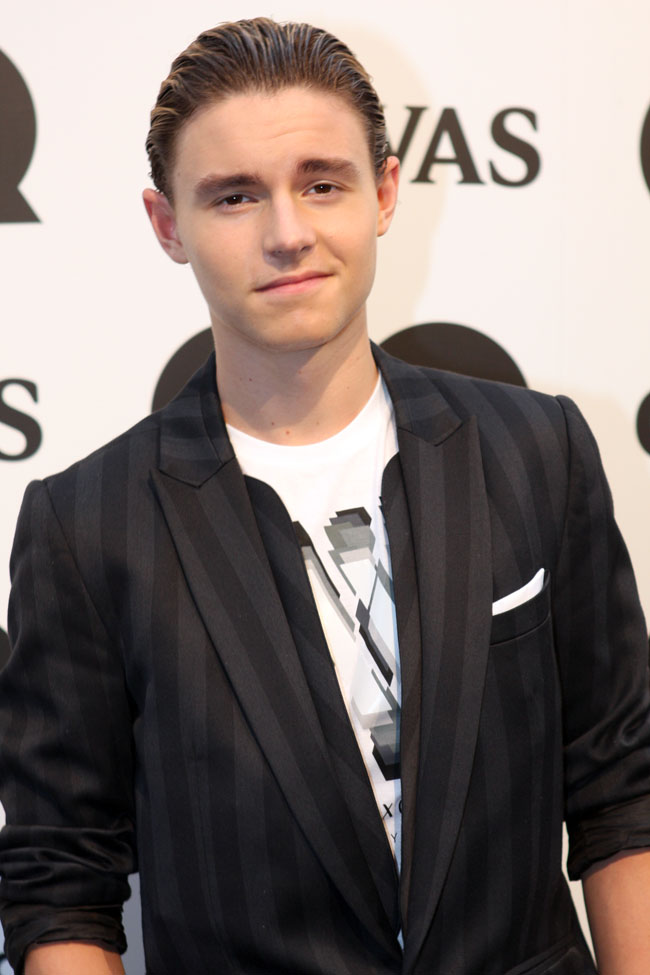
McAuliffe in November 2011

McAuliffe began acting at age eight, appearing in the Australian television series Comedy Inc. and Blue Water High. He then had a recurring role on Packed to the Rafters. He also starred in the Australian independent coming-of-age short film "Franswa Sharl" in 2009, and also had a role in Resistance (2009).

McAuliffe made his American feature debut in Flipped, directed by Rob Reiner. He auditioned for the film while on vacation in the United States and won the role of Bryce, the lead. The film is based on the 2001 novel of the same title by Wendelin Van Draanen.

In May 2010, McAuliffe was cast in a lead role in the science fiction film I Am Number Four based on the novel of the same title by Pittacus Lore, the film is produced by Steven Spielberg and Michael Bay. He played Sam, the best friend of Alex Pettyfer's title character. He then appeared in the Australian miniseries Cloudstreet, based on the novel of the same title by Tim Winton, playing young Quick Lamb. McAuliffe appeared as young Jay Gatsby in the 2013 film adaptation of The Great Gatsby, directed by Baz Luhrmann. McAuliffe subsequently starred in Beneath the Harvest Sky (2013).

McAuliffe was cast as the archangel Uriel alongside Djimon Hounsou in Alex Proyas' action film, Paradise Lost, before the project was suspended. In 2012, he starred in the Australian television film Underground: The Julian Assange Story, as one of the teenage Assange's friends involved in the International Subversives. On 3 February 2013, it was announced that McAuliffe would star alongside Samuel L. Jackson and India Eisley in the live-action film remake of the 1998 Japanese anime Kite. In 2015, McAuliffe joined the cast of The Legend of Ben Hall, an Australian historical epic based on the true story of bushranger Ben Hall, where he portrays real-life gang member Daniel Ryan. In 2018, McAuliffe released his first novel, The Hill Ghost.

== Other activities ==
In November 2011, McAuliffe was a presenter at the final edition of the IF Awards, held at Luna Park Sydney. He was described as IF Magazine as having "already been tipped as the actor to watch", aged just 16.

He was announced as a national ambassador for UNICEF Australia in November 2013.

As of 2013, McAuliffe was the youth ambassador of Wolf Connection, a non-profit organisation based in California which rescues wolves and wolf-dogs, and also has a youth education and empowerment program.

== Filmography ==
=== Film ===
Year	Title	Role	Notes
2004	D.C.	Young Jonathan	Short film
2009	Franswa Sharl	Greg Logan	Short film
2010	Flipped	Bryce Loski	
2011	I Am Number Four	Sam Goode	
2013	The Great Gatsby	Young Jay Gatsby	
2013	Beneath the Harvest Sky	Dominic Roy	
2014	Kite	Oburi	
2014	Robot Overlords	Sean Flynn	
2015	The Stanford Prison Experiment	Henry Ward	
2016	Hacker	Alex Danyliuk	
2017	The Legend of Ben Hall	Daniel Ryan	
2019	Summer Night	Taylor Peters	
2021	Him & Her	Him	
2024	The Duel	Woody	

=== Television ===
Year	Title	Role	Notes
2007	Comedy Inc.	Callum McAuliffe	4 episodes
2008	Blue Water High	Ben	2 episodes
2009	Resistance	Terrance Green	Pilot episode
2009	Packed to the Rafters	Rhys	2 episodes
2011	Cloudstreet	Young Quick Lamb	2 episodes
2012	Underground: The Julian Assange Story	Prime Suspect	Television film
2014	Homeland	Tim Mathison	Episode: "Long Time Coming"
2017–2022	The Walking Dead	Alden	Recurring (Season 8); Also starring (Seasons 9–10); Main cast (Season 11); 27 episodes
2017	Ten: Murder Island	Ben	Television film
2022	Big Sky	Carson Price	Episode: A Thin Layer of Rock
2025	Mayfair Witches	Abel Mayfair	3 episodes

=== Video games ===
Year	Title	Role	Notes
2018	Return of the Obra Dinn	Thomas Lanke, Roderick Andersen, Peter Milroy	

== Accolades ==
Year	Award	Category	Work	Result	Ref
2014	Young Artist Awards	Best Performance in a Feature Film – Supporting Young Actor	The Great Gatsby	Won	
