= The Walking Dead: World Beyond =

American post-apocalyptic drama television series

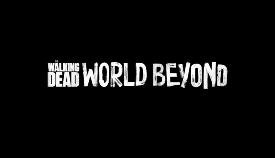
- Genre: Horror; Drama; Zombie apocalypse
- Created by: Scott M. Gimple; Matthew Negrete
- Based on: The Walking Dead by: Robert Kirkman; Tony Moore; Charlie Adlard
- Showrunner: Matthew Negrete
- Starring: Aliyah Royale; Alexa Mansour; Hal Cumpston; Nicolas Cantu; Nico Tortorella; Annet Mahendru; Julia Ormond; Joe Holt; Natalie Gold; Jelani Alladin; Ted Sutherland; Pollyanna McIntosh
- Composer: The Newton Brothers
- Country of origin: United States
- Original language: English
- No. of seasons: 2
- No. of episodes: 20

Production
- Executive producers: Scott M. Gimple; Matthew Negrete; Robert Kirkman; Gale Anne Hurd; David Alpert; Brian Bockrath
- Production location: Hopewell, Virginia
- Camera setup: Single-camera
- Running time: 42–52 minutes
- Production companies: Idiot Box Productions; Circle of Confusion; Skybound Entertainment; Valhalla Entertainment; AMC Studios

Original release
- Network: AMC
- Release: October 4, 2020 – December 5, 2021

Related
- The Walking Dead (franchise); Talking Dead

The Walking Dead: World Beyond is an American post-apocalyptic horror drama television limited series created by Scott M. Gimple and Matthew Negrete that premiered on AMC on October 4, 2020. It is a spin-off to The Walking Dead, which is based on the comic book series of the same name, and the third television series within The Walking Dead franchise. Matthew Negrete, who previously wrote for The Walking Dead, is the showrunner.

The series' two seasons consist of 10 episodes. The second and final season premiered on October 3, 2021, and the final episode aired on December 5, 2021. The series received mixed reviews from critics.

== Premise ==
The series, set in Nebraska ten years after the zombie apocalypse, features four teenage protagonists and focuses on "the first generation to come-of-age in the apocalypse as we know it. Some will become heroes. Some will become villains. In the end, all of them will be changed forever. Grown-up and cemented in their identities, both good and bad."

The series begins in a college town in Nebraska, which is a reference to the season 2 episode of the original series. That episode, titled "Nebraska", mentions that Nebraska was well-poised to resist the zombie apocalypse because of their low human population density and high level of firearms.

In World Beyond, the "Campus Colony" comes into being when the Nebraska State University campus is declared a safe zone at the beginning of the zombie outbreak. Civilians flee to the campus, which is protected by U.S. military personnel. As the rest of the world descends into chaos, the enclave at Nebraska State University survives and thrives to enable a generation of children to grow up in relative safety. Thus the main characters of World Beyond have lived a very sheltered existence and at the start of the series have rarely left the safety of the campus. It is eventually revealed that Omaha is part of the "Alliance of Three", which is an association of three survivor cities: Portland, Omaha and the Civic Republic. In this confederation, the Campus Colony with about 10,000 residents is viewed as a mere satellite branch of the larger Omaha community, which has about 100,000 inhabitants.

== Cast and characters ==
=== Main ===
- Aliyah Royale as Iris Bennett: A smart high school student and aspiring scientist
- Alexa Mansour as Hope Bennett: Iris' adoptive, rebellious and intellectual sister
- Hal Cumpston as Silas Plaskett: A shy teenager who was transferred to the Campus Colony after committing a violent offense
- Nicolas Cantu as Elton Ortiz: An analytical and intellectual fifteen-year-old
- Nico Tortorella as Felix Carlucci: The head of security at the Campus Colony, who was kicked out of his home for coming out as gay
- Annet Mahendru as Jennifer "Huck" Mallick: A security officer at the Campus Colony and Elizabeth's daughter
- Julia Ormond as Elizabeth Kublek: The lieutenant colonel of the Civic Republic Military (CRM)
- Joe Holt as Leopold "Leo" Bennett (season 2; recurring season 1): The adoptive father of Iris and Hope, who is a scientist that is being held by the CRM
- Natalie Gold as Lyla Belshaw (season 2; recurring season 1): A scientist working for the CRM, who is one of Leo's colleagues
- Jelani Alladin as Will Campbell (season 2; guest season 1): A former security officer at the Campus Colony, who is Felix's boyfriend and later husband
- Ted Sutherland as Percy (season 2; recurring season 1): A traveling magician who befriends Iris. As a young child, he was abandoned by his mother and left to his uncle, Tony.
- Pollyanna McIntosh as Jadis Stokes / Anne (season 2): The warrant officer of the CRM who disappeared along with Rick Grimes on board a CRM helicopter in The Walking Dead

=== Recurring ===
- Christina Marie Karis as Kari Bennett (season 1): The adoptive mother of Iris and Hope, who was killed by Amelia at the beginning of the zombie apocalypse
- Scott Adsit as Tony Delmado (season 1): A traveling magician from Las Vegas and Percy's uncle
- Robert Palmer Watkins as Frank Newton (season 2; guest season 1): A loyal and sadistic lieutenant of the CRM
- Anna Khaja as Indira (season 2): The leader of the Perimeter, a small community of artists in contact with the Civic Republic
- Lee Spencer as Brody (season 2): A resident of the Perimeter often opposed to Indira's leadership
- Madelyn Kientz as Asha (season 2): Indira's generous and brave daughter who develops a close bond with Elton
- Abubakr Ali as Dev (season 2): Indira's son and Asha's older brother who is a trusted member of their community
- Maximilian Osinski as Dennis Graham (season 2): A once dedicated and disciplined master sergeant of the CRM who is now trying to pick up the pieces of his life. He is also Huck's husband.
- Will Meyers as Mason Beale (season 2): An intelligent student who befriends Hope at the CRM's research facility. He is also the son of the CRM's leader.
- Gissette Valentin as Diane Pierce (season 2): A smart, driven corporal of the CRM who commands the respect of someone in a much higher position of authority
- Allan Edwards as Terry Ellis (season 2): The head professor at the CRM's research facility who works with Leo and Lyla

=== Guest ===
- Christina Brucato as Amelia Ortiz (season 1): Elton's pregnant mother, who killed Kari at the beginning of the zombie apocalypse, and was then killed by Hope
- Al Calderon as Barca: A sergeant major of the CRM and one of Elizabeth's bodyguards
- Reece Rios as Isaac Ortiz (season 1): Elton's father and a university professor
- Gil Perez-Abraham as Drake (season 1): A soldier in the U.S. Marines and part of Huck's squad
- Paul Teal as Walter (season 1): A desperate survivor seeking revenge on the CRM
- Kai Lennox as Gary Plaskett (season 1): Silas' abusive father
- Jesse Gallegos as Webb (season 2): A CRM worker under Dennis' command
- Noah Emmerich as Edwin Jenner (season 2): A CDC virologist who investigated the zombie outbreak. Emmerich reprises his role after having previously appeared in the episodes "Wildfire" and "TS-19" from the first season of The Walking Dead.

== Episodes ==
Season	Episodes	Originally released	
Season	Episodes	First released	Last released
1	10	October 4, 2020	November 29, 2020
2	10	October 3, 2021	December 5, 2021

=== Season 1 (2020) ===
No. overall	No. in season	Title	Directed by	Written by	Original release date	U.S. viewers (millions)
1	1	"Brave"	Magnus Martens	Scott M. Gimple & Matthew Negrete	October 4, 2020	1.595
Ten years after the world ended, the Campus Colony, Omaha, Nebraska, Portland, Oregon, and the mysterious Civic Republic are allied together in the Alliance of the Three. Hope and Iris Bennett are a pair of highly-intelligent sisters living in the Campus Colony whose father Leo was taken to the CR months ago and who has been communicating with his daughters in secret. As the ten year anniversary approaches, Leo sends two distress messages to his daughters who are divided on what to do while their friend Felix, who is dating Will, the head of Leo's security detail, refuses to do anything as it would involve leaving behind Hope and Iris for whom he is acting as guardian. Lieutenant Colonel Elizabeth Kublek of the Civic Republic Military (CRM) provides the sisters with a coded map to the research facility where Leo is working in New York State. Concerned for their father's safety, Hope and Iris decide to go after him with two other teenagers, Elton Ortiz and Silas Plaskett, Elton wanting to find his mother who has been missing for years while Silas wants to get a fresh start from the rumors about his violent past. However, a flashback reveals that on the Night the Sky Fell, Elton's pregnant mother had killed Hope and Iris' mother in a moment of panic and was then accidentally killed by Hope, something that she has been hiding from her sister. After discovering that the teenagers are gone, Felix follows them with his friend Huck, convinced that they will only get themselves killed. After the group is gone, the Campus Colony is overrun by a herd and destroyed due to Kublek and the CRM. Sergeant Major Barca reports that they cannot find "her" which Kublek is left pleased by.
2	2	"The Blaze of Gory"	Magnus Martens	Ben Sokolowski	October 11, 2020	1.040
Iris proves to be unable to put down a walker that the group encounters, even after it is impaled upon a fallen tree in the struggle. As the group continues on with their journey, Hope begins leaving clues behind for Felix and Huck, losing faith in their plan but being continually outvoted by the others. An encounter with a second walker leaves it chasing the group before Hope, unable to put it down, traps the walker in an abandoned swimming pool. In order to avoid a costly detour, the group, which is dubbed the Endlings by Hope, is forced to go through the Blaze of Gory, a massive perpetual fire that has drawn a massive horde of walkers to it. The Endlings are able to get through part of the Blaze, but become stranded in a tire junkyard containing most of the fire. After the others go to sleep, Hope takes off alone into the Blaze. At the same time, Felix and Huck follow their trail while Felix is haunted by memories of his parents who had kicked him out after discovering that Felix was gay as a teenager. At night, Felix sneaks off and returns home, only to discover that his parents have died and reanimated, but he is unable to bring himself to put them down. Felix and Huck close in on the Endlings thanks to Hope's trail of clues and Felix puts down the walker that has been continually stalking them after it escapes from the swimming pool.
3	3	"The Tyger and the Lamb"	Sharat Raju	The Farahanis	October 18, 2020	1.040
Hope contacts the others and reveals that she has set off into the Blaze of Gory to sound an old tornado siren in order to lure the herd away from them. The others make their way to an office near the factory containing the siren where they are reunited with Felix and Huck. Silas is haunted by flashbacks to a violent altercation of some kind for which he was arrested and has made people fearful of him, calling Silas a monster, causing him to hesitate to put down walkers, admitting to Iris that he's afraid of himself. After some trouble, Hope manages to use the siren to lure most of the herd away, but she injures her foot while making her own escape. Rescuing her sister, Iris puts down her first walker and Hope puts down her first while saving Iris in turn. The Endlings manage to escape the Blaze of Gory and a falling rack of tires keep the herd from following them any further. In the aftermath, the Endlings all refuse to abandon their mission and go home, and Felix and Huck reluctantly agree to join them, although Felix makes it clear that he intends to keep trying to change their minds. Hope finally opens up to Iris and reveals her role in their mother's death and how she had accidentally killed the woman who had killed their mother. In the Civic Republic, Kublek looks over an attack plan for Omaha and she is visited by Sergeant Major Barca who is struggling to come to terms with the genocide that the CRM has committed. Kublek insists that it was necessary to sustain their modern civilization of more than two hundred thousand people and has Barca taken away when his doubts persist. Despite her own insistence, Kublek is shown to be privately shedding tears over the map of Omaha.
4	4	"The Wrong End of a Telescope"	Rachel Leiterman	Sinead Daly	October 25, 2020	1.020
The Endlings take shelter from a storm in an abandoned high school where Felix and Huck take the opportunity to try to change Elton and Hope's minds so that they can get the group to turn around. While searching for supplies, Hope and Huck encounter a wolf stalking the school's hallways, but they manage to escape unharmed and find food supplies in the pantry of the school's fallout shelter. Felix and Elton gather water and investigate what turns out to be the wolf's activities while Iris finds herself drawn to the picture of a rebellious student named Sabina while enjoying imagining high school life and dancing with Silas. However, the wolf and some walkers drive Iris and Silas into the fallout shelter where they discover that several survivors living there have perished and turned, including Sabina. The others manage to rescue the two, but Silas flies into a rage, beating a walker to death with his bare hands and injuring Elton when he tries to stop him. Felix puts down the other walkers and snaps Silas out of it and it is revealed that the violent altercation that he keeps remembering is with his father whom Silas supposedly murdered. With Elton's dedication to the mission wavering, Felix attempts to enlist his help to turn the group around at the Mississippi River, their last best chance to do so while Hope, after recalling fighting with her father before he left, becomes more determined than ever to find him. Iris convinces the horrified Silas not to leave and Elton takes a group photo of the Endlings. In a post-credits scene, Dr. Lyla Belshaw performs experiments on a number of zombified test subjects at the CRM's research facility, one of whom is revealed to be one of her and Leo Bennett's own colleagues, Dr. Samuel Abbott.
5	5	"Madman Across the Water"	Dan Liu	Rohit Kumar	November 1, 2020	0.742
The Endlings arrive at the Mississippi River where all of the bridges were destroyed by the military when things went bad, necessitating a boat crossing. However, there are no boats available, forcing the group to build their own makeshift boat out of supplies that they are able to scavenge from the area. Hope learns of Felix's plan to enlist Elton's help to turn the group around and angrily confronts them both about their behavior. Felix later admits to Iris that he needs Leo and his boyfriend Will to be alright because Felix was originally supposed to be the one to go before Leo asked him to stay behind and look after Hope and Iris for him. With a herd closing in, the claustrophobic Elton is forced to crawl under the boat and fix a problem, but it is ultimately Felix who enables the boat launch just when it seems like they will have to abandon it. The Endlings successfully cross the river into Illinois where Huck departs on a scouting mission for a couple of days. In flashbacks, it is revealed that a five-year-old Elton was the only survivor when the museum that his father worked at fell due to his father hiding Elton in a box in his office. Elton subsequently discovered that his father had turned and been put down by soldiers before Elton made his way to the Campus Colony on his own. While comforting Elton, Hope discovers that she had killed his mother on the Night the Sky Fell. Hearing a noise in the woods next to their camp, the Endlings encounter a teenage boy armed with a stick.
6	6	"Shadow Puppets"	Michael Cudlitz	Maya Goldsmith	November 8, 2020	0.726
The boy, Percy, reveals that two men have stolen his belongings, including a truck that can greatly shorten the Endlings' trip to New York. Iris becomes enamored with Percy, causing Silas, distrustful of Percy's truthfulness, to become visibly jealous of their relationship while Hope struggles with the revelation that she had killed Elton's mother. The Endlings make a deal with Percy to help him retrieve his truck in exchange for Percy giving them a ride to New York. However, Percy turns out to be a grifter who is working with his uncle Tony to steal the Endlings' belongings. Iris becomes trapped in a dumpster while chasing after Percy and, as a herd closes in on the group as they work to save her, Percy and Tony return and rescue them. Percy expresses remorse for his actions, having come back to help after Iris had selflessly tried to help him when she had thought that Percy was in trouble. Tony agrees to drive the Endlings to New York as Percy had promised and he privately reveals to Felix that the truck had belonged to the CRM and that he had found something with the dead driver that could lead the group to a CRM refueling station for supplies for their journey. At the end of the day, the group relaxes by enjoying a shadow puppet show put on by Tony, a former Las Vegas magician, depicting the end of the world. In a post-credits scene, Lyla studies Leo's manuscript and reassures Kublek that neither Leo nor his security detail will be a problem.
7	7	"Truth or Dare"	Michael Cudlitz	Eddie Guzelian	November 15, 2020	0.783
In flashbacks, Huck is revealed to be a former US Marine named Jennifer Mallick who defied orders to execute unarmed civilians as things got bad. Instead, Huck kills her comrades, including her best friend Drake, in order to save the civilians, resulting in Huck scarring her own face to match Drake's scar as a reminder. In the present, after a drunken game of truth or dare, Hope reveals to Huck that she had killed Elton's mother on the Night the Sky Fell and Huck advises Hope to keep it a secret from Elton in order to protect him. Tony reveals that he has managed to get his hands on a map to CRM fuel caches and he has figured out how to decode CRM maps. Using Tony's decoders, Iris is finally able to decipher the coded map that Kublek had given to her and Hope which reveals that the CRM's research facility is located in Ithaca, New York. The Endlings raid the unmanned fuel depot, retrieving CRM code books and enough fuel to make their journey. However, Hope and Huck end up in a hostage situation with Walter, a desperate survivor who has been bitten. Huck promises to help Walter, but after talking him down, Huck kills him instead. Tony and Percy decide to join the Endlings' mission to rescue Leo and a romance begins blossoming between Iris and Percy, much to the jealousy of Silas. However, Iris finds Tony with his head bashed in later that night with Silas' bloody wrench lying next to him and no sign of Percy aside from a blood trail leading out of a window. Nearby, passed out covered in blood with a bottle of liquor next to him, is Silas.
8	8	"The Sky Is a Graveyard"	Loren Yaconelli	Elizabeth Padden	November 22, 2020	0.627
A series of flashbacks reveals that Silas' father was abusive, ultimately leading to a violent altercation in which Silas accidentally killed his father and then had to put him down after his father reanimated and attacked his mother. Although Silas' father's death was ruled to be in self-defense, Silas' past and his blackouts, as well as the murder weapon being found at his side, lead to a division amongst the group about whether or not Silas is guilty of Tony's murder and Percy's disappearance and what to do with him. Silas displays suicidal thoughts, almost allowing a walker to kill him before Hope saves him. Rather than continuing to endanger his friends, Silas claims to Iris that he had murdered Percy and Tony and exiles himself from the group. Elton decides to follow his best friend and before he leaves, Hope confesses to accidentally killing Elton's mom on the Night the Sky Fell. In a flashback to her two day scouting mission, Huck is revealed to be Kublek's daughter and a mole within the group whose mission is to protect "the asset".
9	9	"The Deepest Cut"	Sydney Freeland	Maya Goldsmith & Ben Sokolowski	November 29, 2020	0.618
In a series of flashbacks, Felix and his boyfriend Will argue about Felix being torn between protecting Leo and staying with Hope and Iris, leading to Will going in Felix's place. Huck secretly meets with Kublek who orders Huck to speed up the process of bringing "the asset" to them and to isolate her from the rest of the group. In the present, with only a little more than a hundred miles to go, Huck purposefully crashes the truck and then discreetly injures Felix to slow the group down, making efforts to divide them. At the same time, a distraught Elton finds and protects an unconscious Percy who he hallucinates talking to him, conveying Elton's own mixed emotions. Percy eventually wakes up and reveals that it was actually Huck who shot him, not Silas. Huck apparently succeeds in driving a wedge between Hope and the others and they set out on their own. However, Hope had actually figured out how to break the CRM message codes and learned that Huck is a double agent. In a post-credits scene, Will is chased through the woods by CRM soldiers who are trying to kill him.
10	10	"In This Life"	Magnus Martens	Matthew Negrete & Maya Goldsmith & Ben Sokolowski	November 29, 2020	0.618
In a series of flashbacks, Leo and Kari adopt Hope and Iris as babies. Leo later talks about Hope's genius with Lyla Belshaw whom he is dating; Lyla subsequently informs the CRM, causing them to deem Hope "the asset". In the present, Leo expresses his distrust of the CRM to Lyla and asks for her help in proving that he's right. Elton and Percy locate Silas and reveal that Huck was the one who had murdered Tony and shot Percy; with CRM soldiers closing in, Silas turns himself in to give his friends the chance to get away. Elton and Percy agree to find their friends and save them with Percy seeking to get revenge on Huck. Hope confronts Huck who reveals that the CRM need Hope's talents to help with Leo's research and rebuild the world, but they needed her to see what she was trying to save which is why they had set Hope on her cross-country path. After a fight between Huck and Felix, Hope agrees to go with the CRM, but she secretly tells Iris that they are going to beat the CRM together. Hope and Huck meet with Kublek who tells Huck that she intends to deal with the other Endlings despite Huck's protests. In the woods, Felix and Iris are reunited with Will who is with a large group of people and realizes that they do not know that the Campus Colony has been destroyed.

=== Season 2 (2021) ===
No. overall	No. in season	Title	Directed by	Written by	Original release date	U.S. viewers (millions)
11	1	"Konsekans"	Loren Yaconelli	Matthew Negrete	October 3, 2021	0.753
Six weeks ago, the CRM leads an unimaginably large herd to Omaha and destroys the walls, letting the herd overrun the city and then doing the same thing to the Campus Colony a few days later; Kublek tells Frank Newton that this is only just the beginning of their plans. In the present, Kublek takes Hope to the ruins of Albany where she reveals the destruction of Omaha and the Campus Colony. Unwilling to risk bringing Hope to the research facility, Kublek releases Hope into the city to make a choice between trying to survive on her own and working with the CRM towards a future. After being cornered by a herd, suffering a concussion and hallucinations, Hope agrees to work with the CRM, but privately admits to Huck that while she now believes in working towards a future, she will not help the CRM create one; Hope is reunited with her father at long last. Huck lies to her mother about the Endlings' degree of knowledge to protect them and offers a solution for dealing with the imprisoned Silas. Will reveals to Felix and Iris the destruction of their home and how he was targeted for execution for asking too many questions. Will leads them to the Perimeter, an artist's colony with a neutrality agreement with the CRM and warns that they must prepare for the long game against them. Haunted by nightmares of a walker with a CRM helmet under its face, Iris realizes that the CRM destroyed her home and ambushes and kills a patrolling soldier in revenge.
12	2	"Foothold"	Loren Yaconelli	Carson Moore	October 10, 2021	0.807
Iris, Felix and Will capture a walker and dress it up as Will to make it appear as if Will and the soldier had killed each other; Iris shares her belief that the CRM had destroyed their home, something that Will agrees with. The CRM searches the Perimeter for the group, leading to a tense moment before the bodies are found and the CRM is successfully fooled; Iris and Felix later let out their aggression by eliminating a herd together. At the research facility, Hope takes notes on the security and is given a tour by Lyla who reveals that their research is aimed at both discovering what causes the undead and finding a way to eliminate the ones that already exist, a long-term plan expected to occur over generations. Hope befriends a boy named Mason while Leo, having learned about the CRM's manipulations towards his daughters, demands that the CRM bring him Iris and Felix. Hope hesitates to share the truth with her father while Lyla is shown reporting on Hope and Leo to Kublek. Silas is taken to work at a CRM culling facility run by Dennis Graham where he, Webb, Grady and Tiga work to clear New York of the undead; Dennis is revealed to be Huck's husband.
13	3	"Exit Wounds"	Aisha Tyler	Rayna McClendon	October 17, 2021	0.669
Huck reunites with her husband Dennis and is cleared for a return to active duty following her successful mission. However, Huck struggles to cope with the things that she was forced to do with it being revealed that her mission was a result of a mistake that Dennis made that got people hurt and Huck's own attempts to fix it; Huck decides that, for the time being, she cannot be with Dennis until she sorts her feelings out. Hope attends school and bonds further with Mason as well as coming up with the idea of using yeast fermentation to help accelerate the decay of the undead. However, with Leo continuing to press hard to find Iris and Felix, Hope convinces Huck to take her to the Perimeter using a jeep borrowed from Dennis. Searching for their friends, Elton and Percy try to steal from siblings Asha and Dev, getting them into trouble; Asha and Dev turn out to be Indira's children and they take Elton and Percy to the Perimeter where they are reunited with Iris. Informed of recent events, Elton bonds with Asha while Iris reconnects with Percy. That night, Hope and Huck arrive with Percy plotting revenge against Huck for his uncle's murder.
14	4	"Family Is a Four Letter Word"	Aisha Tyler	Maya Goldsmith	October 24, 2021	0.688
In flashbacks, Huck begins her mission to Omaha. In the present, Hope, Iris, Felix and Huck are reunited and Hope and Huck attempt to convince Iris and Felix to return to the research facility with them. However, Iris and Felix reveal their belief that the CRM had destroyed Omaha and the Campus Colony and they refuse to go with them with Iris failing to convince Hope to stay at the Perimeter instead. While walking in the woods together, Felix almost kills Huck, but he holds off for the time being. Taking advantage of this opportunity, the vengeful Percy attempts to kill Huck, but he is foiled by Felix and Will who reveal Will's survival to Huck and that the CRM had tried to murder him; Huck promises to keep Will's survival a secret. Unable to face Hope yet, Elton flees into the woods where he finds hidden dialysis equipment and bonds further with Asha who claims that it is for her and secretly sourced from the CRM; it's later revealed that Asha is actually covering for her mother who is suffering from kidney failure. Iris keeps Percy's survival a secret from Hope and Huck and later shares a kiss with him; Hope receives a gift from Mason and is convinced of the CRM's guilt by the revelation of what they did to Will. Silas continues working at the culling facility, but his attempts to leave in search of the Endlings results in hazing from his coworkers; Dennis convinces Silas to stay and Webb gets into CRM training. Kublek makes an address about the recent tragedy to Portland and the Civic Republic and her evasive answers about the survivors causes Huck to begin to doubt the CRM's version of events.
15	5	"Quatervois"	Heather Cappiello	Ben Sokolowski	October 31, 2021	0.510
The Endlings visit the culling facility where they enlist Silas' help to break Hope and Leo out of the research facility the next day using one of the facility's box trucks and Dennis' key cad; although initially reluctant, Silas agrees to help. Elton continues to grow closer to Asha who reveals the truth about her mother's illness, explaining that it has to be kept secret as those who wish to lead the Perimeter in a different way will use it against her. Iris and Felix, joined by Percy disguised as Elton, have Indira and Dev turn them over to the CRM and manage to fool Kublek into believing their story. Experimenting with Hope's suggestion of using yeast, Leo and his colleagues have some success in accelerating the decay of the undead before Hope reveals the truth to her father. Leo agrees to their escape plan, but Silas is captured by CRM soldiers, foiling it. Increasingly suspicious of the CRM, Huck finds coded transmissions in her mother's safe confirming the CRM's guilt and that they are using some of the people from Omaha and the Campus Colony as test subjects; Huck seeks out Leo's help to stop it. In a post-credits scene, Sergeant Major Barca has been delivered as Lyla's newest test subject by Jadis who declares that Kublek has been recalled to the Civic Republic indefinitely and Jadis is now in charge.
16	6	"Who Are You?"	Heather Cappiello	Rohit Kumar	November 7, 2021	0.431
In flashbacks, Leo bonds with Lyla while on a research expedition. In the present, Leo determines from the transmissions that Huck had given him that the CRM had used some kind of large-scale chemical weapon to destroy Omaha and the Campus Colony; the massive herd was just the coverup. The Endlings agree to abort their escape and stay to get answers, enlisting Huck's help. After Leo realizes that Lyla is involved, he invites her to dinner as a distraction while Felix and Huck break into a secret cold storage in search of answers; while working with Felix, Huck reveals that she had taken her undercover mission after getting caught covering up for a tough call that Dennis had made while drunk that got people hurt. As Huck creates a power outage, Felix steals a vial of the CRM's weapon and discovers that they have a massive stockpile of gas canisters of it; Felix briefly gets trapped before Huck rescues him, reassuring Felix that she really is on their side. Jadis reveals that she is performing a security audit and discusses her past with Huck while expressing concern that Huck's undercover mission has changed her. Iris sends a message to Will and Elton effectively declaring war on the CRM; after a failed coup by Brody, Elton reveals Indira's illness to Will. While Elton performs a flower ceremony with Asha, Dev helps Will sneak into the research facility to warn the others. However, the two are found by a patrol and Dev is killed while Will flees.
17	7	"Blood and Lies"	Lily Mariye	Sinead Daly	November 14, 2021	0.490
After Dennis backs up his story, Jadis releases Silas into Dennis' custody and expressing interest in him becoming a CRM soldier in the future before beginning an investigation into the missing vial with the help of Huck. At the same time, Leo discovers that the vial contains a modified variant of chlorine gas which is what the CRM had used to wipe out Omaha and the Campus Colony under the cover of a massive walker attack. In exchange for the vial's return, Lyla Belshaw reveals to Hope and Iris that her secret work is about studying reanimation as it happens using bitten or killed test subjects. She also reveals that the Civic Republic government has no idea what their military is up to. After getting the vial back, Lyla exposes Leo as the thief and the true nature of her work to him and he reluctantly agrees to help her with research. However, Jadis has Lyla killed by her newest test subject, Sergeant Major Barca, and reveals to Huck that the CRM intends to wipe out Portland next. Huck warns the others through Percy after talking him down from killing her in revenge and Hope decides that they must destroy the facility and rescue all of the scientists in order to stop the CRM. Huck reveals the truth to Dennis and enlists his help before being confronted by Silas while Hope learns that her new friend Mason is actually the son of Major General Beale, one of the high-ranking officials of the CRM.
18	8	"Returning Point"	Lily Mariye	Eddie Guzelian	November 21, 2021	0.527
In a flashback to two years before, Kublek offers Indira discreet medical treatment for her kidney failure. In the present, Leo informs the other scientists of the genocide committed by the CRM and they agree to join him in escaping with all of their research. After learning about Indira's deal, Brody betrays his people to Jadis in the hopes of getting a home in the Civic Republic, but he is executed by Huck when he tries to blackmail her. Jadis orders a lockdown of the facility, apparently trapping the Bennett family, Percy, Felix, the scientists and Mason Beale, whom Hope abducts, in the bio-containment unit while she sends a team to the Perimeter to kill everyone there. After Indira fails to talk Jadis down, a gunfight erupts between the CRM soldiers, Will, Dennis, Silas and Indira, ending with all of the soldiers and a few of the residents dead as well as Dennis being severely wounded. Having come to inform the others of the plan, Dennis orders Silas to take his friends and get ready for what comes next. While the facility is on lockdown, the group trapped in the lab are able to break into the old mining tunnels beneath the facility, setting C4 to cover their escape behind them. Jadis reveals to Huck that the scientists have wiped all of their research from the mainframe and, in order to set an example, she sends teams into the tunnels with orders to kill everybody on sight.
19	9	"Death and the Dead"	Loren Yaconelli	Erin Martin & Sam Reynolds	November 28, 2021	0.539
The Bennett family, Percy, Felix, the scientists and Mason Beale escape into Lyla's lab where they attach C4 to a number of her zombified test subjects and send them into the tunnels, collapsing the tunnels and killing a number of CRM soldiers. Using Mason as a hostage, Leo forces Jadis to give them two trucks to escape with, but only the scientists go while the others remain behind in order to destroy the chlorine gas. However, after putting down several test subjects in the facility's cold storage, including a reanimated Lyla, Hope and Felix discover that Jadis has anticipated that they would go after the gas and had secretly moved it. At the same time, Elton manages to remove the bullet from Dennis and he and Silas gather a massive herd and lead it to the research facility as a distraction for the others. The herd overruns the facility, forcing the CRM to retreat. With Dennis needing antibiotics, Silas and Elton raid the medical storage room, leading to the death of Silas' old coworker Webb when he draws walkers upon himself while trying to stop them. Using the globe sculpture that the Perimeter had built for the CRM, Silas and Elton manage to escape. However, as the others make their own escape, they are confronted by Jadis who reveals that the CRM had committed the genocide as a preemptive move after discovering that the Alliance had become too reliant upon them for survival which would have eventually created a chaotic chain reaction of disasters that had the potential to spread to the Republic itself. Huck is forced to break her cover in order to save her friends, but Percy is killed while trying to stop Mason from escaping. In the aftermath, Jadis contacts Major General Beale for reinforcements and to move up the attack on Portland while a spike strip strands Leo and several of the scientists in enemy territory. Although the Endlings believe that they have lost, Huck stumbles upon the gas hidden at Dennis' culling facility, giving them one last chance to stop the genocide in Portland.
20	10	"The Last Light"	Loren Yaconelli	Matthew Negrete & Maya Goldsmith & Carson Moore	December 5, 2021	0.428
Frank Newton and a team of soldiers ambush Leo, Felix, Will and the scientists leading to a gunfight in which Leo and Will kill the CRM soldiers and Felix lures Frank away. After a brutal fight, Felix disembowels Frank and leaves him to be devoured by walkers. At the same time, the Endlings fight their way through the herd back to Dennis' outpost where Silas decides to stay and help Huck and Dennis. Iris, Hope and Elton manage to escape the area with the help of Indira and Asha, but Elton is bitten in the arm while protecting Hope, forcing him to undergo an amputation. After sending Silas and Dennis away, Huck fights Jadis who kills Huck, but learns too late that Huck has rigged up her father's watch as a makeshift timer on the C4. Jadis escapes as the gas is destroyed and she arrests Kublek for treason, blaming her for the CRM's failure. With the CRM closing in on them, the mortally wounded Dennis has Silas kill him in order to convince the CRM that he was an unwilling participant. Silas accepts an offer from Jadis to join the CRM while secretly plotting to infiltrate the organization and warn the right people about the CRM's actions. After Elton recovers, he, Iris, Asha and a number of Indira's people make their way to Portland while Leo, Hope, Indira, the scientists and a now married Felix and Will remain behind to continue their research. In a post-credits scene, a French scientist is confronted by a man who accuses the woman and her colleagues of causing and worsening the outbreak. The man kills the scientist who becomes a faster, stronger and more aggressive kind of zombie while Dr. Edwin Jenner discusses the overseas variants in a video message in the background.

== Production ==
=== Development ===
In July 2018, during San Diego Comic Con, executive producer Scott Gimple announced that a new The Walking Dead spin-off series was in the works. In April 2019, AMC gave a ten-episode order for the series. In July, the series was given the working title of Monument. On November 24, 2019, Gimple revealed the show's title. In January 2020, alongside the series premiere date announcement, AMC confirmed that the series would only consist of two seasons.

=== Casting ===
In July 2019, Alexa Mansour, Nicolas Cantu, and Hal Cumpston were cast in undisclosed main roles. The same month, Aliyah Royale and Annet Mahendru joined the cast. The following month, Nico Tortorella also joined. Julia Ormond was announced as a cast member in November 2019, playing the role of Elizabeth Kublek, the "charismatic leader of a large, sophisticated and formidable force".

In August 2019, Joe Holt was cast in a recurring role. In November, Natalie Gold, Al Calderon, Scott Adsit and Ted Sutherland were cast as Lyla, Barca, Tony and Percy.

In May 2021, Robert Palmer Watkins joined the cast in a recurring role for the second season. For the second season, Joe Holt, Jelani Alladin, Natalie Gold and Ted Sutherland were promoted to series regulars.

=== Filming ===
Filming for the series began late July 2019 in Richmond, Virginia, and was expected to last until November 2019. Jordan Vogt-Roberts was originally announced to be the director of the pilot episode. Vogt-Roberts was replaced with Magnus Martens, who previously directed for Fear the Walking Dead. The change in directors was a result of the writers mapping out the rest of the season and production needing to go in a different direction; Negrete said Vogt-Roberts contributed ideas to the first episode. The series was looking to film a plane crash in the vein of Lost with filming to take place in Hopewell, Virginia, during the first two weeks of August.

== Release ==
=== Broadcast ===
The series was originally set to premiere on April 12, 2020, on AMC, after the tenth-season finale of The Walking Dead. However, in March 2020, AMC announced that the premiere had been delayed and would instead debut "later [that] year". On July 24, 2020, it was announced that the series would premiere on October 4, 2020. The series premiered on October 1, 2020, on AMC+, AMC's premium on-demand streaming service; each episode became available three days before its broadcast premiere. The final season premiered on October 3, 2021, on AMC.

Outside the United States, the series is distributed by Amazon Prime Video and first premiered on October 2, 2020.

=== Home media ===
The first season was released on Blu-ray and DVD on June 15, 2021. The second season was released on Blu-ray and DVD on March 8, 2022.

== Reception ==
The Walking Dead: World Beyond received mixed reviews from critics. On Rotten Tomatoes, the first season has a score of 46% with an average rating of 4.90/10 based on 24 critics. The website's critical consensus reads: "World Beyond's strong performances and new perspective within The Walking Dead universe aren't enough to make it stand out in an increasingly crowded franchise." On Metacritic, the first season has a score of 48 out of 100 based on 10 critics, indicated "mixed or average reviews".

Daniel D'Addario of Variety gave it a generally positive review and wrote, "This is not a perfect series... And yet there's a willingness to reinvent, to genuinely probe a corner of the universe previously untouched, that makes this series feel serious in its intent and, for fans of the forerunning series, well worth checking out". In a more negative review from Candice Frederick of TV Guide, she graded the series two out of five stars and wrote, "World Beyond doesn't offer audiences fresh ideas or even fascinating characters for which to root."
