= God Bless the Broken Road =

2018 film by Harold Cronk

- Theatrical release poster
- Directed by: Harold Cronk
- Screenplay by: Jennifer Dornbush; Harold Cronk
- Based on: "Bless the Broken Road" by Nitty Gritty Dirt Band
- Produced by: Harold Cronk; Andy Fraser; Dustin Solomon; Edgar Struble
- Starring: Lindsay Pulsipher; Makenzie Moss; Andrew Walker; Kim Delaney; Robin Givens; Gary Grubbs; Arthur Cartwright; LaDainian Tomlinson; Madeline Carroll; Ian Van Houten; Jordin Sparks
- Cinematography: Philip Roy
- Edited by: Jesse Daniel
- Music by: Will Musser
- Production companies: 10 West Studios; Great Basin Entertainment; Really Good Home Pictures
- Distributed by: Freestyle Releasing
- Release date: September 7, 2018
- Running time: 111 minutes
- Country: United States
- Language: English
- Budget: $3.4 million
- Box office: $2.8 million

God Bless the Broken Road is a 2018 American Christian drama film directed by Harold Cronk. A loose interpretation of the 1994 song "Bless the Broken Road," the plot follows a mother who loses her husband in the War in Afghanistan and must cope with the loss. The film stars Lindsay Pulsipher, Makenzie Moss, Andrew Walker, Kim Delaney, Robin Givens, Gary Grubbs, Arthur Cartwright, LaDainian Tomlinson, Madeline Carroll, Ian Van Houten, and Jordin Sparks. It was released in the United States on September 7, 2018, by Freestyle Releasing.

== Plot summary ==
The film tells the story of a young mother named Amber Hill who loses her husband in Afghanistan and struggles to raise their young daughter Bree in his absence. She meets a race car driver named Cody Jackson who helps to restore her faith.

Amber was living a happy life with her daughter even while her husband was deployed and they are excited that he is returning home soon. While Amber is directing her choir practice at church, 2 soldiers interrupt their song to bring her the news that her husband was killed and Amber immediately breaks down and cries.

After the death of her husband in Afghanistan, his surviving spouse loses her faith and puts his last unopened letter in her Bible. 2 years later, Amber Hill continues to send her daughter Bree to church. The mother and daughter struggle as Amber is a waitress at a Kentucky diner called "Rosie's". Amber rejects help from her mother-in-law Patti and many others. The bills pile up and she receives a foreclosure notice on her home. Her daughter gets a mustard seed in Sunday school and plants it and even names it Matt.

Cody Jackson, a race car driver, takes interest in Amber and helps her daughter build a go-cart. The Pastor, the choir ladies, and disabled Mike all try to encourage her to come back to church. The seed of faith remains in her heart. Amber wants to raise her daughter on her own. Patti the mother-in-law sees Amber's wedding rings are missing. While babysitting, she finds a stack of bills. Amber assures Patti things are under control (presumably she is terrified of losing custody of Bree due to her poor salary).

Amber starts to date Cody and her daughter really likes him. Her mother never likes to talk about her dead dad. Bree feels all alone while her Mom copes with her own grief and low paying job, she wants to become a manager but Rosie refuses to promote her due to her constant tardiness. They go to one of Cody's races and he gets in an accident. Cody's accident is too much for Amber and she forbids Bree to see him. When Bree disobeys her Mom and continues to see Cody, Amber pulls Bree to the van and goes home and Bree angrily tells Amber that she hates her and wishes she had died instead of her Dad. Bree throws her plant and breaks it then she runs away and when found says she wants to live with her grandmother. Amber prays for an answer.

Mike Nelson tells Amber about how her husband saved his life. His last words were: "You are loved more than you will ever know." Mike gives her a cross that Darren had made from IED scraps. Amber, Bree and Patti go to Darren's grave and read his last letter together. Bree wins the go kart race. Cody wins a race at Berlin Raceway. Amber returns to church and is singing Bless the Broken Road. A new mustard seed labeled "Faith" is seen growing in the window.

== Cast ==
- Lindsay Pulsipher as Amber Hill
- Makenzie Moss as Bree Hill
- Andrew Walker as Cody Jackson
- Kim Delaney as Patti Hill
- Robin Givens as Karena Williams
- Gary Grubbs as Joe Carter
- Arthur Cartwright as Mike Nelson
- LaDainian Tomlinson as Pastor Williams
- Madeline Carroll as Hannah
- Jordin Sparks as Bridgette
- Ian Van Houten as David
- Adam Agee as Johnson
- Patrika Darbo as Rosie
- Gianna Simone as Monica
- Ben Browder as Sgt. Price
- Cody Coughlin as himself
- Micah Tyler as himself

== Production ==
Much of the cast, including Kim Delaney and Jordin Sparks, signed on in May 2016. Principal photography on the film began in the Spring of 2016 in West Michigan, and it received a state tax credit of $2.7 million. LaDainian Tomlinson joined the cast in January 2017. Some racing scenes for the movie were recorded at Berlin Raceway.

== Reception ==
=== Box office ===
In the United States and Canada, God Bless the Broken Road was released on September 7, 2018 alongside The Nun and Peppermint, and was projected to gross $2–4 million from 1,235 theaters in its opening weekend. However, it ended up debuting to just $1.4 million, finishing 11th at the box office.

=== Critical response ===
On review aggregator website Rotten Tomatoes, the film holds an approval rating of 17% based on 12 reviews, and an average rating of 4/10. On Metacritic, the film has a weighted average score of 31 out of 100, based on six critics, indicating "generally unfavorable" reviews. Audiences polled by CinemaScore gave the film an average grade of "A" on an A+ to F scale.
