= Spin the Bottle (2024 film) =

- Release poster
- Directed by: Gavin Wiesen
- Written by: John Cregan
- Produced by: Will Hayes; Jim Valdez; Kyle Hayes; Chris Barish
- Starring: Tanner Stine; Kaylee Kaneshiro; Tony Amendola; Ryan Whitney; Hal Cumpston; Angela Halili; Samantha Cormier; Ali Larter; Justin Long
- Production company: Fortress Media Group
- Distributed by: Paramount Home Entertainment
- Release date: October 4, 2024
- Running time: 124 minutes
- Country: United States
- Language: English

Spin the Bottle is a 2024 American horror film written by John Cregan, directed by Gavin Wiesen and starring Tanner Stine, Kaylee Kaneshiro, Tony Amendola, Ryan Whitney, Hal Cumpston, Angela Halili, Samantha Cormier, Ali Larter and Justin Long.

== Plot ==
A group of teenagers, while playing the classic party game "spin the bottle," inadvertently release a malevolent spirit in an abandoned house with a dark history. As they begin to die in horrifying ways, the survivors must uncover the house's sinister secrets to end the bloodshed.

== Cast ==
- Tanner Stine as Cole Randell
- Kaylee Kaneshiro as Kasey Stanton
- Justin Long as Sheriff Stanton
- Ali Larter as Maura Randell
- Christopher Ammanuel as Travis
- Ryan Whitney as Mila Jayne
- Angela Halili as Sophie
- Samantha Cormier as Lorelai Randell
- Hal Cumpston as Westin
- Tony Amendola as Father Harris

== Production ==
In September 2022, it was announced that filming wrapped.

== Release ==
The film was released on digital platforms by Paramount Home Entertainment on October 4, 2024.

== Reception ==
Tyler Doupe of Dread Central awarded the film two and a half stars out of five.
