= Ella Rae Peck =

American actress (born 1990)

- Born: Minneapolis, Minnesota, U.S.
- Occupation: Actress
- Years active: 2006–present

Ella Rae Peck is an American actress. She portrayed the roles of Charlotte "Lola" Rhodes in The CW series Gossip Girl and Mia Bowers in the NBC series Deception.

== Life and career ==
Peck was born in Minneapolis, Minnesota, and went to school in New York City.

After a short film titled Lilly in the Woods in 2006, Peck appeared in the independent film Freezer Burn in 2007. The same year, she portrayed Honor Caldwell in the pilot Dear Harvard which is depicting Honor's life challenges during a sudden change in family social class status while attending a private all-girls school. For this role, she won the Best Actress Award at the New York Television Festival. She then landed guest roles in several TV series such as Without a Trace, Law & Order, The Good Wife and Blue Bloods between 2008 and 2010. She was also in the films God Don't Make the Laws and Young Adult in 2011.

In January 2012, she started appearing in the recurring role of Lola Rhodes, Serena van der Woodsen's cousin, in Gossip Girl, making a cameo in December in the series finale. In January, the film Bachelorette, in which she's Stefanie, was presented at the Sundance Film Festival and in March she landed the role of Mia Bowers in the 2013 NBC series Deception. On September 22, The Exhibitionists was presented at the Arizona Underground Film Festival.

On January 7, 2013 Deception made its debut on television and between January 17 and January 27 the short film The Apocalypse competed at the Sundance Film Festival. In early March 2013, she joined the cast of the NBC comedy pilot Welcome to the Family, which is picked up in May, while on March 15 the film The Call, with Halle Berry, was released.

== Filmography ==
Film
Year	Title	Role	Notes
2007	Freezer Burn	Emma	
2011	God Don't Make the Laws	Colbie Palmer	
2011	Young Adult	Girl	
2012	Bachelorette	Stefanie	
2012	The Exhibitionists	Lynn	
2013	The Call	Autumn	
2016	Long Nights Short Mornings	Katie	
2019	Tuscaloosa	Anne	
2024	Crumb Catcher	Leah	

Television
Year	Title	Role	Notes
2007	Dear Harvard	Honor Caldwell	Television film
2008	Without a Trace	Lisa/KitKat14	Episode: "Rewind"
2010	Law & Order	Zoe Morgan	Episode: "Steel-Eyed Death"
2010	The Good Wife	Jenny Bauer	Episode: "Doubt"
2010	Blue Bloods	Caitlin Breyer	Episode: "Smack Attack"
2012	Gossip Girl	Charlotte "Lola" Rhodes	Recurring role (seasons 5–6), 15 episodes (2 uncredited)
2013	Deception	Mia Bowers	Main role
2013	Welcome to the Family	Molly Yoder	Main role
2014	Believe	Nina Adams	Episodes: "Origin", "Revelation", "Second Chance"
2014	Hysteria	Audra Young	Unsold television pilot
2016	Feed the Beast	Anna Davis	Recurring role
2018	The Looming Tower	Heather	Recurring role
2019	God Friended Me	Vivian	Episode Two Guys, a Girl, and a Thai Food Place
2020	The Sinner	Sophie Greenfield	Season 3
