= Indivisible (2018 film) =

2018 American Christian film

- Theatrical release poster
- Directed by: David G. Evans
- Written by: David G. Evans; Cheryl McKay Price; Peter White
- Produced by: Darren Moorman; Justin Tolley
- Starring: Sarah Drew; Justin Bruening; Eddie Kaulukukui; Jason George; Madeline Carroll; Tanner Stine; Michael O'Neal; Tia Mowry; Eric Close
- Cinematography: Bob Scott
- Edited by: Jeff Canavan
- Music by: Paul Mills
- Production companies: Pure Flix; Provident Films; The WTA Group
- Distributed by: Pure Flix
- Release dates: October 5, 2018 (Orpheum Theatre); October 26, 2018 (United States)
- Running time: 119 minutes
- Country: United States
- Language: English
- Budget: $2.7 million
- Box office: $3.6 million

Indivisible is a 2018 American Christian war drama film directed by David G. Evans, who co-wrote the screenplay with Cheryl McKay Price and Peter White. Starring Sarah Drew, Justin Bruening, Tia Mowry and Eric Close, the film is based on the true story of Darren Turner, a United States Army chaplain who struggles to balance his faith and the Iraq War. It was released in the United States on October 26, 2018 by Pure Flix, and received mixed reviews from critics.

== Cast ==
- Justin Bruening as Darren Turner, an Army chaplain
- Sarah Drew as Heather Turner, Darren's wife
- Eddie Kaulukukui as Sgt. Carter
- Eric Close as Ltc. Jacobsen
- Tia Mowry as Tonya Lewis, Michael's wife
- Jason Winston George as Michael Lewis
- Madeline Carroll as Amanda Bradley
- Michael O'Neill as Chaplain Rogers
- Skye P. Marshall as Sgt. Shonda Peterson
- Tanner Stine as Lance Bradley

== Production ==
The film shot over the course of 32 days in Memphis, Tennessee, with the Iraq scenes being filmed near Santa Clarita, California, ending in June 2017.

== Release ==
Indivisible premiered on October 5, 2018 at the Orpheum Theatre in Memphis, and was theatrically released in the United States on October 26, 2018.

=== Box office ===
In the United States and Canada, Indivisible was released alongside Hunter Killer and Johnny English Strikes Again, and was projected to gross around $3 million from 830 theaters in its opening weekend. It ended up debuting to $1.5 million, finishing #13 at the box-office.

=== Critical response ===
On review aggregator Rotten Tomatoes, the film holds an approval rating of 78% based on 18 reviews, with an average rating of 6.5/10. On Metacritic, the film has a weighted average score of 53 out of 100, based on 6 critics, indicating "mixed or average" reviews. Audiences polled by CinemaScore gave the film an average grade of "A" on an A+ to F scale, while PostTrak reported filmgoers gave it an 82% positive score.
