= Tanner Stine =

American actor

Tanner Stine is an American actor. He played the lead in the 2018 film Run the Race. On television, he played Joey Johnson on Days of Our Lives.

He graduated from Valley High School and attended Santa Monica College. He is from West Des Moines, Iowa.

== Filmography ==
=== Film ===
Year	Title	Role	Notes
2016	Seduced	Noah	
2017	The Nine-Ball Corridor	Brady	
2017	Get Big	Alec Schaff	
2018	Run the Race	Zach Truett	
2018	Indivisible	Lance Bradley	
2019	Extracurricular Activities	Kenny Dawkins	
2024	The Thundermans Return	Oyster	
2024	Andy & Emma - The First Date	Clifford	Short film
2024	Spin the Bottle	Cole Randell	

=== Television ===
Year	Title	Role	Notes
2014	The Haunted Hathaways	Connor McTigue	1 episode
2014	Bambi Cottages	Danny Campbell	TV movie
2015	NCIS	Young Anthony DiNozzo	1 episode
2015	I Didn't Do It	Hogan	1 episode
2015	Wicked City	Mitch	2 episodes
2016	Teen Wolf	Jake	1 episode
2017	Zac and Mia	Evan	10 episodes
2018	Here and Now	Robb Spencer	4 episodes
2014–2018	The Thundermans	Oyster	21 episodes
2018	Adopted	Mikey	6 episodes
2018	Juicy Stories	Unknown	TV movie
2018	A Million Little Things	KC	2 episodes
2015–2019	Betch	Various	8 episodes
2018–2019	Impulse	Clay Boone	16 episodes
2022	Days of Our Lives: Beyond Salem	Joey Johnson	5 episodes
2022	Acapulco	Aaron	1 episode
2022–2023	Days of Our Lives	Joey Johnson	18 episodes
2024	Monsters	Perry Berman	2 episodes
