= Floating (film) =

- Directed by: William Roth
- Written by: William Roth
- Produced by: Anaye Milligan
- Starring: Norman Reedus; Chad Lowe; Will Lyman; Sybil Temchen; Casey Affleck; Robert Harriell
- Cinematography: Wolfgang Held
- Edited by: Keith Reamer
- Music by: David Mansfield
- Production company: Arclight Partners
- Distributed by: Phaedra Cinema
- Release date: February 20, 1997 (Berlinale)
- Running time: 90 minutes
- Country: United States
- Language: English

Floating is a 1997 American drama film written and directed by William Roth and starring Norman Reedus.

== Plot ==
Van is a man who struggles set against a turbulent emotional time and financial woes. His life is altered at age sixteen by a car accident during which his father's legs were severed. His mother, who cannot endure her husband's alcoholism and his depression, which leads to financial loss, has abandoned the family. Van is left to shoulder the responsibility for his embittered father, with no one to help him through his own pain and problems.

== Cast ==
- Norman Reedus as Van
- Chad Lowe as Doug
- Will Lyman as Van's Father
- Sybil Temchen as Julie
- Casey Affleck as Prep #1
- Robert Harriell as Steve
- Jonathan Quint as Jason
- Josh Marchette as Flip
- Bruce Kenny as Coach
- Linda Roth as Screening Woman #1
- Arnold Roth as Screening Man #1
- Ali Raisin as Girl #1
