= Love's Everlasting Courage =

- Written by: Kevin Bocarde
- Directed by: Bradford May
- Starring: Wes Brown; Julie Mond; Bruce Boxleitner; Cheryl Ladd
- Music by: Brian Byrne
- Country of origin: United States
- Original language: English

Production
- Executive producer: Robert Halmi Jr.
- Producers: Erik Heiberg; Lincoln Lageson
- Cinematography: Maximo Munzi
- Editor: Jennifer Jean Cacavas
- Running time: 88 minutes
- Production company: RHI Entertainment

Original release
- Network: Hallmark Channel
- Release: October 1, 2011

Love's Everlasting Courage is a 2011 American made-for-television Christian drama film. It premiered October 1, 2011 and is the second prequel of the Love Comes Softly series of Hallmark Channel films which depicts life in the mid-to-late 19th century. It has the alternate title Love's Resounding Courage.

== Plot ==
During a drought in the 1800s, Clark Davis is having difficulty making payments on a loan. His well is dry and he is unable to find water while drilling other wells. Clark is transporting water from a river for his livestock and garden. His wife Ellen takes a job as a seamstress to help pay off the loan. She gets afflicted with scarlet fever and dies. Their daughter Missie causes a fire and burns down part of their cabin. The movie ends with Clark receiving financial help from his parents Lloyd and Irene.

== Cast ==
- Wes Brown as Clark Davis
- Bruce Boxleitner as Lloyd Davis
- Cheryl Ladd as Irene Davis
- Julie Mond as Ellen Davis
- Morgan Lily as Missie Davis
- Willow Geer as Sarah
- Tyler Jacob Moore as Ben Graham
- Kirk B.R. Woller as Bruce Conner
- James Eckhouse as Mr. Harris
- Courtney Marmo as Laura
