= Welcome to the Family (American TV series) =

- Genre: Sitcom
- Created by: Mike Sikowitz
- Starring: Mike O'Malley; Mary McCormack; Ella Rae Peck; Joey Haro; Ricardo Antonio Chavira; Justina Machado; Fabrizio Zacharee Guido
- Composer: Gabriel Mann
- Country of origin: United States
- Original language: English
- No. of seasons: 1
- No. of episodes: 9 (6 unaired in the U.S.)

Production
- Executive producer: Mike Sikowitz
- Producers: Barbara Stoll; Mike O'Malley; Michael Borkow
- Cinematography: John Peters; Lowell Peterson
- Camera setup: Single-camera
- Production companies: Old Charlie Productions; Sony Pictures Television

Original release
- Network: NBC
- Release: October 3 – October 17, 2013

Welcome to the Family is an American sitcom television series that aired on NBC from October 3, to October 17, 2013 on Thursdays at 8:30 p.m. Eastern/7:30 p.m. Central, after Parks and Recreation. On May 10, 2013, the network placed a series order for the single camera comedy, which was canceled from NBC television schedule on October 18, 2013 after three episodes had aired.

== Plot ==
The series follows a clash of cultures involving two American families brought together by the couple formed by Junior, the valedictorian son of a Latino family, and Molly, the less academic daughter of an Anglo family. The two are finishing high school and Junior is Stanford bound. On graduation day, they discover that Molly is pregnant. The pair decide to get married, forcing a bonding and blending of their two very different families.

== Cast ==
=== Main cast ===
- Mike O'Malley as Dr. Daniel Stacy "Dan" Yoder – Molly's father
- Mary McCormack as Caroline Yoder – Molly's mother
- Ella Rae Peck as Molly Yoder
- Joey Haro as Junior Hernandez
- Ricardo Antonio Chavira as Miguel Hernandez – Junior's father
- Justina Machado as Lisette Hernandez – Junior's mother
- Fabrizio Zacharee Guido as Demetrio Hernandez

=== Guest stars ===
- Eva Longoria as Demetrio's teacher—and Miguel's ex-girlfriend.
- Diedrich Bader as Rick, Mike's friend and business partner.
- Josh Meyers as Rollins, Caroline's annoying coworker.
- Joel Murray as Gabe, Caroline's recovering-alcoholic coworker.
- Bonita Friedericy as Sandra, Molly's spiritual adviser.
- Craig Cackowski as Todd, Mike's basketball teammate.
- Dorion Renaud as Friend, Molly and Juniors Classmate.
- Tisha Terrasini Banker as Woman.
- Jamie McShane as Officer Simon.

== Episodes ==
No.	Title	Directed by	Written by	Original release date	Prod. code	Viewers (millions)
1	"Pilot"	Michael Engler	Mike Sikowitz	October 3, 2013	100	2.99
Dan and Caroline Yoder are attending their daughter Molly's high-school graduation; she barely passed and can't stop texting long enough to receive her diploma. At the same time, Miguel and Lisette Hernandez's eldest son Junior, is delivering his valedictorian speech when he receives a text from Molly that says she's pregnant. Not knowing of his daughter's relationship with Junior, Dan has a shouting match with Miguel when he tries to use a "free boxing lesson" coupon at the gym Miguel owns. Later, when Junior insists his parents meet Molly's parents, Miguel and Dan continue to berate each other. While Caroline and Lisette attempt to deal with the situation and each other's families, Miguel and Dan stay negative.
2	"Dan Finds Out"	Michael Engler	Mike Sikowitz	October 10, 2013	101	2.49
Caroline finds out she is pregnant and wants to keep it secret, but Junior finds out. At their children's request, Miguel and Dan try to work out their differences at the gym.
3	"The Big RV Adventure"	Michael Engler	Michael Borkow	October 17, 2013	103	2.42
Dan buys an RV to have more family time; Miguel and Lisette discover that Demetrio's teacher is Miguel's ex.
4	"Molly and Junior Find a Place"	Linda Mendoza	Peter Murrieta	October 25, 2013	102	N/A
Molly and Junior decide to move into their own place.
5	"Halloween"	Linda Mendoza & Rebecca Asher	Vanessa McCarthy	November 1, 2013	104	N/A
Molly and Junior go to a costume party on Halloween; Caroline tries to hide her pregnancy from an important client.
6	"Dan and Miguel Play Ball"	Rebecca Asher	Dylan Morgan & Josh Siegal	November 8, 2013	105	N/A
Dan asks Miguel to play in his weekly basketball game, at which Miguel accidentally loses a tooth; at the dental clinic Miguel bites Dan's finger. In the meantime, Caroline and Lisette get into a fight, and Junior gets a job in the biology lab.
7	"Lisette's Abuela Visits"	Michael Engler	Alex Cooley	November 15, 2013	108	N/A
Lisette's grandmother visits, and Lisette has been hiding her family's real lifestyle from relatives. Meanwhile, Junior thinks Molly has gone into denial about her pregnancy.
8	"Thanksgiving"	Jay Chandrasekhar	Mike Sikowitz	November 29, 2013	107	N/A
9	"Junior Takes a Stand"	Bryan Gordon	Richard Manus & Isaac Gonzalez	December 6, 2013	106	N/A

== Release ==
The series was available on Hulu at the time of its premiere, and was also available on STAR World India.

== Reception ==
The show received negative reviews before its cancellation. In a review for Variety, Brian Lowry said Welcome to the Family was "a sitcom with all the depth of a knock-knock joke." The Washington Post's Hank Steuver anointed it as his "nominee for quickest and most punitive cancellation" and gave it an F. A writer for TV by the Numbers described the viewership as "dismal", falling to "anemic" by the second week.
