= Sammy Keyes =

Mystery novel series by Wendelin Van Draanen

- The hardcover edition of the first book.
- Sammy Keyes and the Hotel Thief; Sammy Keyes and the Skeleton Man; Sammy Keyes and the Sisters of Mercy; Sammy Keyes and the Runaway Elf; Sammy Keyes and the Curse of Mustache Mary; Sammy Keyes and the Hollywood Mummy; Sammy Keyes and the Search for Snake Eyes; Sammy Keyes and the Art of Deception; Sammy Keyes and the Psycho Kitty Queen; Sammy Keyes and the Dead Giveaway; Sammy Keyes and the Wild Things; Sammy Keyes and the Cold Hard Cash; Sammy Keyes and the Wedding Crasher; Sammy Keyes and the Night of Skulls; Sammy Keyes and the Power of Justice Jack; Sammy Keyes and the Showdown in Sin City; Sammy Keyes and the Killer Cruise; Sammy Keyes and the Kiss Goodbye
- Author: Wendelin Van Draanen
- Country: United States
- Language: English
- Genre: Mystery; Comedy; Young adult
- Publisher: Random House
- Published: 1997-2014
- Media type: Print

Sammy Keyes is a series of mystery novels written by Wendelin Van Draanen for children aged 10–16. The series focuses on Sammy's adventures as an amateur sleuth. The books, which are narrated in the first-person perspective by Sammy, involve detective fiction as well as comedy. Sammy begins her adventures in the first book as a seventh-grader, and the series ends when she completes the eighth grade. The series ran for eighteen books.

== Setting ==
The novels are based in the fictional town of Santa Martina, located in California. Santa Martina is closely based on the real city of Santa Maria, California, down to names of streets used throughout the series, and well-known landmarks. Other fictional cities frequently mentioned are Santa Luisa (San Luis Obispo), and Sisquane (Sisquoc). The city of Pomloc is also mentioned once, a reference to the city of Lompoc. All of these places are located near to the real city of Santa Maria. Sammy is an amateur teenage detective who solves mysteries while also dealing with friends, family, and relationships.

== Main characters ==
- Samantha Josephine "Sammy" Keyes is a girl who is sent to live with her grandmother when her mother decides to pursue her dreams as an actress in Hollywood. Spunky, sarcastic, and very curious, she solves mysteries in her town and the places she visits. She is often bullied at school and by other characters she meets. She plays on the school softball team as the catcher, using a softball mitt that belonged to her dad. The series starts in Sammy Keyes and the Hotel Thief, at the beginning of Sammy's first year in William Rose Junior High as a seventh-grader. By Sammy Keyes and the Power of Justice Jack, she is now halfway through her last year of junior high. She has a difficult relationship with her mother.
- Rita Keyes "Grams" , is Sammy's grandmother and guardian with whom Sammy lives. Because no children are allowed to live in the Senior Highrise, Sammy is frequently forced to lie about her home address and living situation. Sammy and her grandmother are very close, much closer than Sammy is to her mother. The two also have to constantly avoid their nosy neighbors (Mrs. Graybill and later in the series Mrs. Wedgewood) to avoid being evicted.
- Lana Keyes "Lady Lana" is Sammy's irresponsible and careless mother. She constantly keeps secrets from her daughter, and leaves Sammy with Grams while she becomes an actress in Hollywood. She finally reveals Sammy's father's identity in Sammy Keyes and the Showdown in Sin City. She has also kept Sammy's true age away from Sammy and changed her own identity and age to seem younger. Sammy is not happy with her mother's decision to abandon her, and holds a grudge against her for this. She stars on a soap opera as Jewel, an "amnesiac and good friend" throughout the series. She is known as the Gas Away Lady and Lady Lana, or when Sammy is on good terms with her (which is not often), Mom. As of Sammy Keyes and the Power of Justice Jack, Lana is now dating Casey's father and out of a job because her soap opera has been canceled.
- Marissa McKenze, Sammy's best friend, is extremely rich and has more independence than Sammy because of her workaholic parents. She has a younger brother named Mikey, and he has an addiction for both junk food and goldfish. After Sammy Keyes and the Cold Hard Cash, Mikey's love for junk food goes down and he slowly starts losing weight. When Marissa is nervous, she will do the "McKenze Dance", which involves biting of her fingernails and bobbing up and down on her toes. Marissa also has a crush on Danny Urbanski, an eighth-grader. Marissa downplays her wealth heavily, sometimes criticizing her parents for working too hard and not paying enough attention to their children. Later in the series, Marissa and her family start having serious financial issues, which causes Marissa to become closer to her brother.
- Brandon McKenze is Marissa's cousin and Sammy's good friend. Although he is in high school, Sammy seemed to have feelings for him in the earlier books, but slowly began to become comfortable around him after developing stronger feelings for Casey. Brandon is on the swim team and often invites Marissa and Sammy to his meets. He works at a smoothie place in the mall. He, similar to Marissa, comes from a rich family, as his father is a popular doctor in town.
- Margaret "Dot" DeVries was introduced in the second book, Sammy Keyes and the Skeleton Man. Her nickname is derived from a beauty mark she has on her cheek; her father also has one. Dot first lived in a "skinny" two-story house that could barely fit her large family; by the fifth book, Sammy Keyes and the Curse of Moustache Mary, she has moved to a larger house in Sisquane. Her grandparents live in Holland and her mother often says "ja" instead of "yeah". In Sammy Keyes and the Skeleton Man, Sammy sneaks into Heather's Halloween party by posing as Dot's cousin, and added a fake beauty mark to make it more "convincing".
- Holly Janquell was introduced in the third book, Sammy Keyes and the Sisters of Mercy. During Sammy's volunteer time (to work off her detentions for misusing the school's public address system), she spots a girl who bears an uncanny resemblance to herself. Her curiosity aroused, Sammy tries to find out as much as she can about this girl. Eventually, Sammy finds that Holly is a homeless, orphaned girl who ran away from her foster home due to mistreatment, who had been living in a refrigerator box by a dried-up riverbank. Sammy finds a home for Holly at the Pup Parlor, a dog-grooming salon run by the mother-and-daughter duo Vera and Meg Talbrook. In return for the Talbrooks' kindness, Holly works after school in the Pup Parlor. In the beginning, Holly has a penchant for rummaging through garbage; however, later in the series she seems to have shaken off the habit. In 2006, Van Draanen later released a book called Runaway, a series of journal entries written by Holly that detail her life on the run.
- Heather Acosta is Sammy's archenemy. Their mutual dislike for each other originates at their first meeting: Heather tries to take advantage of Marissa's wealth by asking her to lend her some money, and then jabs Sammy with a pin. Enraged, Sammy punches Heather on the nose, and Heather pretends that her nose is broken. As punishment, Sammy is suspended from school for a day. Later, however, Sammy is able to uncover Heather's bid for sympathy (including a spurious charity called the "Help Heal Heather Fund") and Heather is punished. Heather and her friends have been known to smoke cigarettes and drink beer. She has a brother called Casey, and their parents are divorced; Heather lives with their mother in town, and Casey with their father in the urban area of Sisquane. In Sammy Keyes and the Psycho Kitty Queen, she is found to have the same birthday as Sammy, much to their horror. Throughout the books, she has tried to ruin Sammy's reputation, as well as physically attacking her at least once. However, later Sammy and Heather seem to have become friends, as in Sammy Keyes and the Showdown in Sin City, after helping each other find their parents.
- Casey Acosta Heather's brother Casey was introduced to the series in the fifth book Sammy Keyes and the Curse of Moustache Mary, and seems to be the complete opposite of his sister. He is good friends with Sammy and often sticks up for her. Sammy is often unsure of her relationship with Casey, who took a liking to her before she even knew him. The two went to a school dance together in Sammy Keyes and the Dead Giveaway. In Sammy Keyes and the Wild Things, Sammy began to have feelings for him and they grow closer. Casey shows strong feelings for Sammy throughout the series. Sammy's friends often tease her about her relationship with Casey. In Sammy Keyes and the Wedding Crasher, Sammy believed that their relationship would be over because she received a harsh text telling her to back off, but she later found out that it was Heather that sent the text. At the end of the book, the two kiss. In Sammy Keyes and the Night of Skulls, the two are an official couple, and they frequently hang out.
- Warren Acosta is the father of Heather and Casey. He lives in a house alone with Casey in Sisquane and seems to sound exactly like his son over the phone. He has also shown feelings toward Sammy's mother, a situation that disturbs both Sammy and Casey. Warren has a distant relationship towards Heather and has joked that "sometimes he wishes that he had a restraining order on Heather, too".
- Candi Acosta is divorced from Warren Acosta, and is the mother of Heather and Casey. She often acts like her daughter portraying characteristics that are vicious and impolite. Candi dislikes Sammy, and is known for her strange style. Candi lives in Santa Martina, with Heather, and Casey often visits (by his father's orders.) In Sammy Keyes and the Showdown in Sin City, it is proven that Candi still has hidden feelings for her ex-husband, Warren.
- Officer Gil Borsch, is constantly pursuing Sammy for jaywalking and thinks that she is a criminal. However, when Sammy helps him out in a case during Sammy Keyes and the Runaway Elf, he changes his mind about her and they become friends over time. In Sammy Keyes and the Cold Hard Cash, he becomes engaged "for the third time" and even asks Sammy to be in his wedding. In the later books, he is promoted and Sammy doesn't see him as often.
- Hudson Graham is 73 years old, and is always wearing a fancy pair of boots, usually made out of reptile hide. Sammy often visits Hudson and sits on his porch to sort things out in her head. Hudson offers Sammy advice, usually focused around dealing with her archenemy, Heather, or the mystery currently playing out in that particular book. Hudson has a dachshund called Rommel, accused in Sammy Keyes and the Psycho Kitty Queen of mauling cats, and who unfortunately passes at the age of 13 in Sammy Keyes and the Cold Hard Cash. Hudson's advice usually plays a pivotal point in Sammy's unraveling of the story's mystery. In later books, Hudson and Grams develop a mutual crush on each other and end up getting married.
- Billy Pratt, an obnoxious, albeit lovable classmate of Sammy's. Billy is one of the popular kids in their grade and was elected "School Clown." Billy was held back; he is supposed to be an 8th grader. This perhaps contributes to his depiction in the series as the school clown. Billy has kissed Sammy on a dare by Heather in an attempt to ruin her relationship with Casey, but Billy makes it up to her by kissing Heather (the cod fish) during the school play. In Sammy Keyes and the Night of Skulls he gets together with Marissa, but later she breaks up with him. He is also a close friend of Casey's.

== Awards ==
Sammy Keyes and the Hotel Thief won the 1999 Edgar Award for Best Children's Mystery. The series has been nominated for the award five times. The nominated books are Sammy Keyes and the Curse of Moustache Mary, Sammy Keyes and the Search for Snake-Eyes, Sammy Keyes and the Art of Deception and Sammy Keyes and the Wild Things.
