= Deception (2013 American TV series) =

- Also known as: Notorious; Infamous
- Genre: Soap opera
- Created by: Liz Heldens
- Starring: Meagan Good; Laz Alonso; Tate Donovan; Wes Brown; Katherine LaNasa; Ella Rae Peck; Victor Garber; Marin Hinkle
- Country of origin: United States
- Original language: English
- No. of seasons: 1
- No. of episodes: 11

Production
- Executive producers: Liz Heldens; Gail Berman; Peter Horton; Gene Stein; Lloyd Braun
- Running time: 43–44 minutes
- Production companies: BermanBraun; Universal Television

Original release
- Network: NBC
- Release: January 7 – March 18, 2013

Deception is an American prime time soap opera television series that aired on NBC. The series, created by Liz Heldens, premiered on Monday, January 7, 2013.

On May 8, 2013, NBC canceled the series after one season.

== Plot ==
When Vivian Bowers, a famous socialite, is found dead in a motel room from what appears to be a drug overdose, her estranged best friend Detective Joanna Locasto is re-embraced by the wealthy Bowers family. In time, she begins to uncover the truth of what really happened to her friend and who was behind the death.

== Characters ==
=== Main ===
- Joanna Locasto (played by Meagan Good): A detective from the San Francisco Police Department and old friend of the Bowers family. She is working undercover with FBI agent Moreno to investigate Vivian's death. Joanna is asked to stay undercover by Haverstock, who wants to get the evidence needed to put Robert away for Vivian's murder.
- Robert Bowers (played by Victor Garber): The founder and CEO of a pharmaceutical company and the father of Vivian, Edward, and Julian. Robert is revealed to have murdered Vivian, yet the motive behind this was not revealed.
- Sophia Bowers (played by Katherine LaNasa): Robert's second wife and former secretary. It is revealed that Robert only married Sophia because people believed that he got her pregnant when it was Vivian who was pregnant by Haverstock.
- Edward Bowers (played by Tate Donovan): Robert's older son by his first wife.
- Mia Bowers (played by Ella Rae Peck): Haverstock and Vivian's biological daughter who was raised as Robert and Sophia's daughter. Mia gives Haverstock bone marrow because she is the only one who can be his donor.
- Will Moreno (played by Laz Alonso): An FBI agent investigating Vivian Bowers' death and the Bowers family.
- Julian Bowers (played by Wes Brown): Robert's younger son by his first wife and Joanna's Boyfriend.
- Samantha Bowers (played by Marin Hinkle): Edward's estranged wife.

=== Recurring ===
- Vivian Bowers (played by Bree Williamson): A socialite who is the daughter of Robert and his first wife and an old friend of Joanna Locasto. She is Mia's biological mother, but was raised as her sister. Her friendship with Joanna was strained due to Vivian's drug addiction. Vivian was found dead in a motel room following a supposed drug overdose. It turned out that Vivian was murdered by Robert.
- Tom Vanderfield (played by Geoffrey Cantor): The Bowers' family attorney.
- Dwight Haverstock (played by John Larroquette): A senator with a dark past and Mia's biological father. Haverstock asks Joanna to stay undercover because he wants the evidence needed to put Robert away for murder. Haverstock has said that he was in love with Vivian.
- Beverly Padget (played by S. Epatha Merkerson): Joanna’s mother.
- Kyle Farrell (played by David A. Gregory): Mia's boyfriend. Haverstock blackmailed Kyle into getting close to Mia so that he could convince her to save his life. Kyle grew to care for Mia and told her the truth before she gave Haverstock her bone marrow.
- Nichole Frishette (played by Anna Wood): Former journalist who is later killed (appeared in six episodes).

== Episodes ==
No.	Title	Directed by	Written by	Original release date	U.S. viewers (millions)
1	"Pilot"	Peter Horton	Liz Heldens	January 7, 2013	5.66
When the wealthy socialite and drug addict Vivian Bowers was found dead of an overdose, no one was surprised. Only FBI agent Will Moreno was convinced that the death was a homicide and that someone in her family did it. He decided to get the help of Detective Joanna Locasto, who grew up in the Bowers' home and was Vivian's best friend, to help find out who killed her. When she attends the funeral, the family embraces her as she begins to uncover secrets about why Vivian was murdered. It also puts her right into the lion's den.
2	"Nothing's Free, Little Girl"	Jonas Pate	Liz Heldens	January 14, 2013	4.14
Joanna continues to look into Vivian's death as the Bowers family has some problems. Edward is suspected of killing Vivian and Robert knows of a threat to the family.
3	"A Drop of Blood and a Microscope"	Jonas Pate	Peter Elkoff	January 21, 2013	3.61
Joanna's cover causes her to spend more time with Samantha and Julian. Meanwhile, Edward is fired from his job and Mia makes some rash decisions with a new friend.
4	"One, Two, Three…One, Two, Three"	Dan Lerner	Alexandra Cunningham	January 28, 2013	3.73
Ever since Joanna saw Mia's photo with Julian's ring, she realized that Julian is hiding something about the night of Vivian's murder. Edward receives disturbing news while Robert and Sophia meet Mia's boyfriend.
5	"Why Wait"	Andrew Bernstein	Jordan Hawley	February 4, 2013	3.08
Mia's debutante ball is ruined and her life shattered when the truth about her biological mother is revealed. Julian tries to reconnect with a former flame who could help get the new cancer drug on the market.
6	"Don't Be a Dummy"	Michael Schultz	Kath Lingenfelter	February 11, 2013	3.23
After learning the truth about her biological mother, Mia runs away with her boyfriend. Meanwhile, Will investigates Edward's home.
7	"Tell Me"	Tate Donovan	Brent Fletcher	February 18, 2013	3.13
As Lyritrol gets closer to being on the shelves of Bowers Pharmaceutical, Edward makes a disturbing discovery about the drug. Joanna follows a lead. Senator Haverstock reveals his identity to Mia.
8	"Stay With Me"	Jonas Pate	Monica Macer	February 25, 2013	3.28
During a press conference, Edward makes a confession that impacts his family and their business. Mia is contacted by her biological father. Joanna must evade a hit man.
9	"Good Luck With Your Death"	Jonas Pate	Jessica Goldberg	March 4, 2013	3.35
Joanna's story of why she was at the family home and company makes Robert suspect her. Mia decides whether to help her biological father, Haverstock. Joanna begin investigating Julian's girlfriend as Sofia meets an old friend.At the end Joanna and Julian kiss.
10	"You're the Bad Guy"	Gloria Muzio	Kevin J. Hynes	March 11, 2013	3.28
Joanna finds tapes of Vivian's therapy sessions. Julian works with the FBI to get evidence against Audrey. Edward turns himself in for murder. A newly-released Wyatt confronts Sophia. Mia donates bone marrow to her biological father.
11	"I'll Start with the Hillbilly"	Jonas Pate	Liz Heldens & Peter Elkoff	March 18, 2013	3.41
Joanna discovers that Robert was behind Vivian's murder while Moreno suspects Sophia. Mia is kidnapped by Wyatt. Edward seeks revenge after his wife's death. Julian hears something about his mother's death, and later asks Joanna to move in with him. Haverstock wants to punish Robert for Vivian's death.
