= Re:Fashion =

- Genre: Reality-TV
- Written by: James Clark; Brandon Cox; Marcy Harriell; Robert Harriell
- Directed by: James Clark
- Starring: Marcy Harriell; Robert Harriell
- Country of origin: United States
- Original language: English
- No. of seasons: 1
- No. of episodes: 11

Production
- Cinematography: Brandon Cox
- Production company: Bluprint

Original release
- Release: July 24, 2018

Re:Fashion is an American reality-TV series airing on TN Marketing's Craftsy. The series is hosted by actress Marcy Harriell, alongside husband Robert Harriell. The entertainment forward series follows her exploits as she takes clothing from her closet and off the rack that are 'not quite up to snuff', and turns them into unique fashion items that highlight her sensibilities.

== Synopsis ==
Inspired by Marcy Harriell's alternate online persona, oonaballoona, Re:Fashion takes a peek behind the curtain and brings oona to live action. In each episode, she shares tips and ticks on how to refashion wardrobe, while encouraging viewers to find their distinct style and 'inner funkiness', often incorporating her husband's special blend of sewing insouciance to get to the final result. With an emphasis on having fun and embracing the 'technicolor' self, the Harriells' take viewers along for their adventures, and share fashion fails and triumphs along the way.

== Production ==
Re:Fashion was created as one of the first entertainment forward productions of Bluprint after NBCUniversal acquired Craftsy and launched the new, over-the-top video platform.

== Episodes ==
Source: IMDB

=== Series overview ===
Season	Episodes	Originally released
1	5	July 24, 2018
2	6	July 5, 2019

=== Season 1 (2018) ===
No. overall	No. in season	Title	Directed by	Written by	Original release date
1	1	"Girls' Night Out"	James Clark	James Clark & Brandon Cox & Marcy Harriell & Robert Harriell	July 24, 2018
2	2	"Jeans + Tee"	James Clark	James Clark & Brandon Cox & Marcy Harriell & Robert Harriell	July 24, 2018
3	3	"Cult-ure Dress"	James Clark	James Clark & Brandon Cox & Marcy Harriell & Robert Harriell	July 24, 2018
4	4	"Wax Print Circle Skirt"	James Clark	James Clark & Brandon Cox & Marcy Harriell & Robert Harriell	July 24, 2018
5	5	"Festival Robe"	James Clark	James Clark & Brandon Cox & Marcy Harriell & Robert Harriell	July 24, 2018

=== Season 2 (2019) ===
No. overall	No. in season	Title	Directed by	Written by	Original release date
6	1	"Why You So Fancy"	James Clark	James Clark & Brandon Cox & Marcy Harriell & Robert Harriell	July 5, 2019
7	2	"The R.E.S.P.E.C.T. Dress"	James Clark	James Clark & Brandon Cox & Marcy Harriell & Robert Harriell	July 5, 2019
8	3	"In the Stars"	James Clark	James Clark & Brandon Cox & Marcy Harriell & Robert Harriell	July 5, 2019
9	4	"His to Hers"	James Clark	James Clark & Brandon Cox & Marcy Harriell & Robert Harriell	July 5, 2019
10	5	"Date Night"	James Clark	James Clark & Brandon Cox & Marcy Harriell & Robert Harriell	July 5, 2019
11	6	"Maix to Mini"	James Clark	James Clark & Brandon Cox & Marcy Harriell & Robert Harriell	July 5, 2019

== Reception ==
=== Awards ===
Best Instructional Video - 2019 Cynopsis Awards
