= Hal Cumpston =

Australian actor

- Born: Sydney, Australia
- Education: Waverley College
- Occupations: Actor, writer, producer
- Years active: 2019–present
- Father: Jeremy Cumpston
- Relatives: Joseph Zada (half-brother); Nici Cumpston (aunt)

Hal Cumpston is an Australian actor, producer, and writer. He is known for his role as Silas in the American TV series The Walking Dead: World Beyond; as Zachary in Nine Perfect Strangers, and as Max Kerr in the 2023 SBS Television legal drama miniseries Safe Home.

== Early life and education ==
Hal Cumpston is of Aboriginal Australian (Barkandji) and Afghan Australian heritage through his father's maternal line. Both of his parents work in the film Industry. His father, Jeremy Cumpston, is a doctor and a Western Australian Academy of Performing Arts graduate who founded the Old Fitzroy Theatre and has appeared in TV shows such as All Saints. His mother, Rachel Lane, is a nonfiction producer-director.

Cumpston grew up in Sydney, New South Wales. He attended Waverley College, where he was heavily involved in drama. In his final year of school, he was shortlisted for "OnStage", which recognises excellence for high school drama performances. Cumpston was also chosen as a state finalist in the Australian Class Clowns stand-up comedy competition.

== Career ==
After returning from Schoolies week, Cumpston wrote the screenplay for a teen comedy called "Bilched" that his father helped fund and direct. His high school friends Ewen and James helped co-produce, and he called in his younger brothers and friends as part of the cast alongside bigger names like comedian Alex Williamson and Rhys Muldoon. Cumpston wanted to make an Australian comedy teen movie because he felt there weren't any good ones. In three days he had written 34 pages and in less than a fortnight he had a first draft. In 2018, the film was shot in 21 days in Sydney's eastern suburbs. In the following year Cumpston completed the post-production. The plot follows protagonist Hal, who auditions for a drama school but is told his performance is not honest. "Bilched" was Cumpston's first project and received a national release in Australia and at the 2019 Chelsea Film Festival, it won the award for Best Screenplay, Best Supporting Actor (Fred Du Rietz) and the Grand Prix Best Feature Film.

Three weeks after production on "Bilched" wrapped, Cumpston received his first American audition via an email that came from an American talent agency. Actress Jenni Baird had seen an article in a magazine featuring the Cumpstons, and her partner, writer-director Michael Petroni, knew someone in an American casting office and put in a call. Cumpston embodied the brief needed for Silas in The Walking Dead: World Beyond, and recorded a video audition. Cumpston won the role, in which portrays a teen making his way through a world changed forever by the outcome of a global pandemic. Filming took place in Richmond, Virginia.

In 2021, Cumpston played Zachary, the dead son of the Marconi family in the series Nine Perfect Strangers alongside Nicole Kidman, Asher Keddie, and Melissa McCarthy. The series is based on a Liane Moriarty book and centres around a group of people at a health retreat trying to find a path to a better life but are met with dilemmas.

Cumpston is inspired by Seth Rogen, Quentin Tarantino, and Evan Goldberg in his writing.

Cumpston played Max Kerr, housemate of the main character, In the 2023 SBS legal drama Safe Home.

== Filmography ==
=== Film ===
Year	Title	Role	Notes
2019	Bilched	Hal	
2022	The Greatest Beer Run Ever	Leary	
2022	Maddie's Red Hot	Hal	Short
2024	The Deb	Mitch	
2024	Spin the Bottle	Westlin	
2026	Balls Up	Eco Warrior PJ	

=== Television ===
Year	Title	Role	Notes
2020–21	The Walking Dead: World Beyond	Silas Plaskett	TV Series; 20 episodes
2021	Nine Perfect Strangers	Zach Marconi	TV Series; 5 episodes
2023	Safe Home	Max Kerr	TV Series; 4 episodes
2023–24	Granny Flat Comedy	Hal	TV Series; 3 episodes
2023	The Artful Dodger	Oliver Twist	TV Series; 2 episodes
2023	Fairbairn in the City	Toby	Mini Series; 2 episodes
2025–26	Going Dutch	Corporal Elias Papadakis	TV Series
