= Madeline Carroll =

American actress

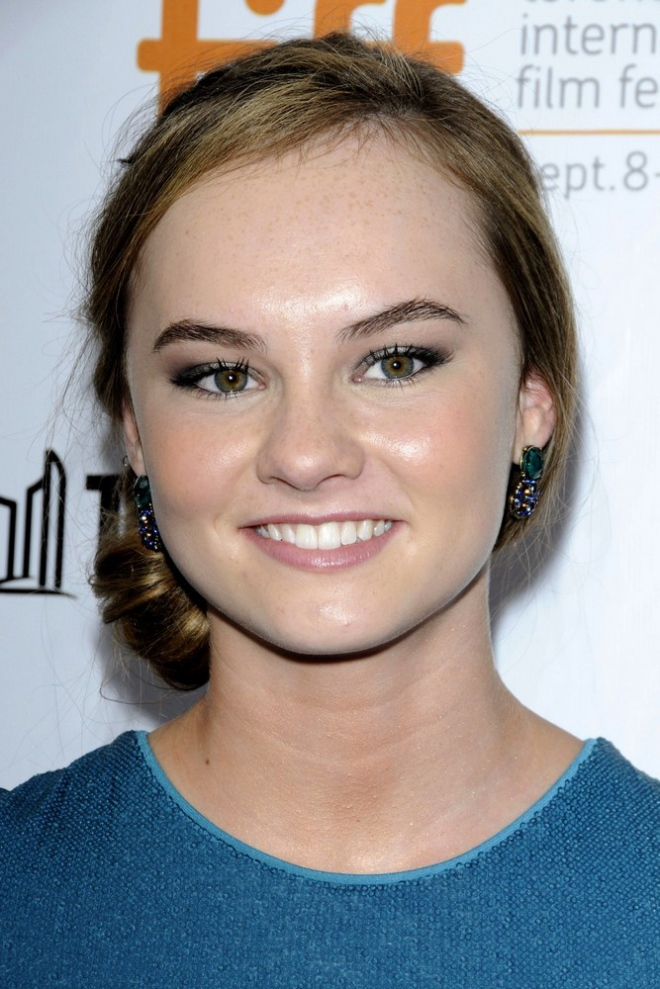
- Carroll at the 2011 Toronto International Film Festival
- Born: March 18, 1996 (age 30); Los Angeles, California, U.S.
- Occupation: Actress
- Years active: 1999–present

Madeline Carroll (born March 18, 1996) is an American actress known for starring as Molly Johnson in Swing Vote, as Farren in The Spy Next Door, as Juli Baker in Flipped, as Janie Popper in Mr. Popper's Penguins and as Willow O'Neil in The Magic of Belle Isle.

== Early life ==
Carroll began modeling at the age of three. At the age of four, she was discovered by her theatrical agent 'Wendy' in a nail shop in Sherman Oaks. She began her career appearing in numerous commercials for companies such as Allstate, Chef Boyardee, Kmart, Mr. Clean, Subway, Super 8 Motels and Target Corporation.

== Career ==
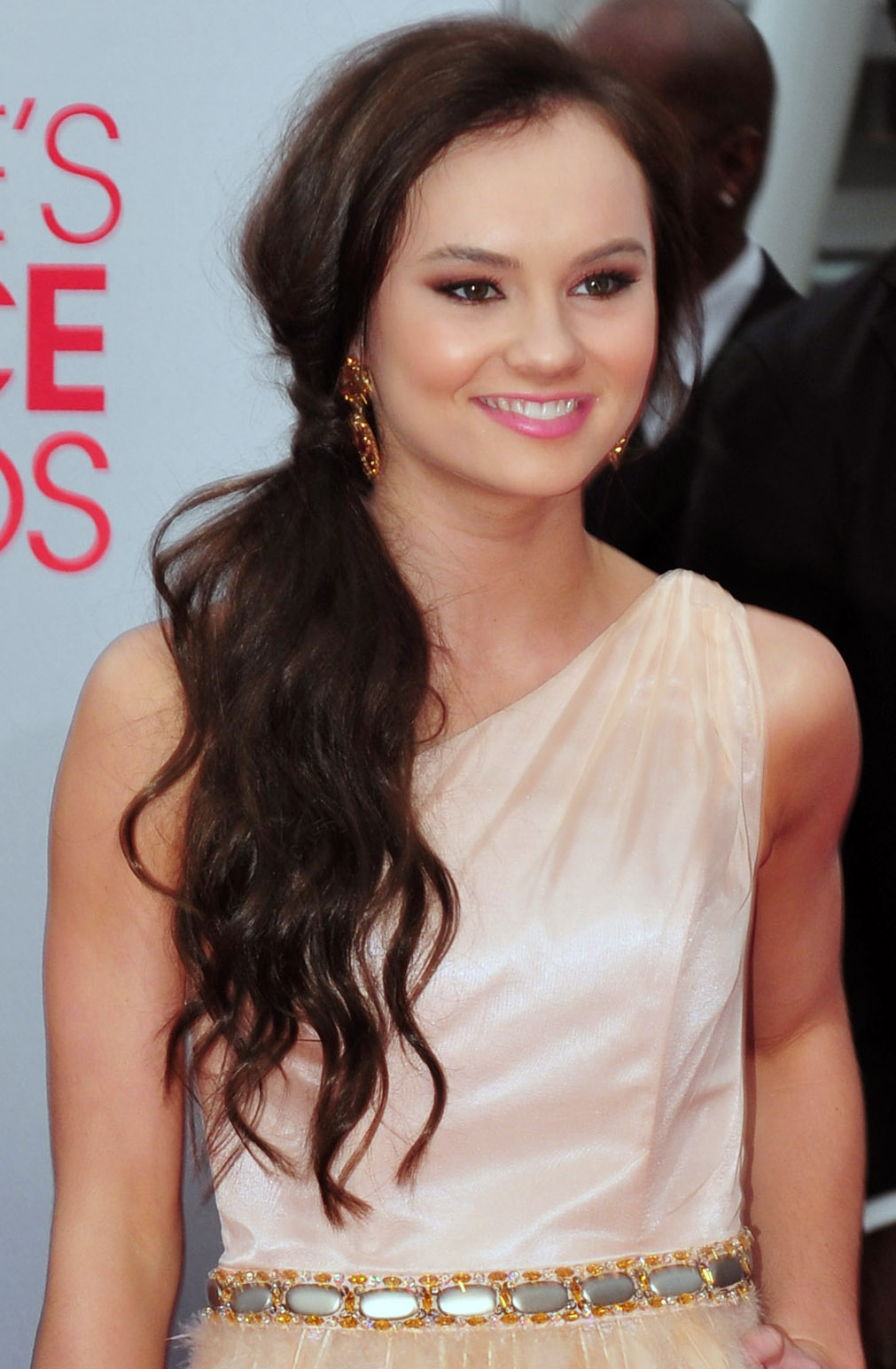
Carroll at the 38th People's Choice Awards in 2012

Her first appearance in a film was in the 2006 horror film When a Stranger Calls. After minor roles in The Santa Clause 3: The Escape Clause and Resident Evil: Extinction, in 2008 she got her first major role co-starring in Swing Vote alongside Kevin Costner. In 2010 she appeared in the Jackie Chan film The Spy Next Door. That same year she also starred in the film adaptation of Wendelin Van Draanen's novel, Flipped, directed by Rob Reiner. Carroll's performance in the film garnered critical acclaim, and in 2011 and 2012 she appeared in numerous other movies such as Mr. Popper's Penguins, Machine Gun Preacher, and The Magic of Belle Isle.

Around age 15, Carroll began to be offered nude or promiscuous roles, all of which she turned down due to her personal beliefs. In 2014, also for personal reasons, she turned down a larger role in the show Scandal, in which she had already appeared in two episodes. When she was 19, she nearly gave up being an actress altogether after a call from her agent, who stated that it was impossible to be a Hollywood actress without taking nude roles. Later, she related the following:

I said I'm going to call my agent and I'm going to quit. And literally, I don't know, the Holy Spirit, I guess, pulled me back down to my knees and I said "but God, if you still called me here and this is what you want from me, then you have to send me something and better yet, send me something that would edify you and that's how I'll know that I'm still called to be here."

The next day, she was offered a role in the Christian film God Bless the Broken Road. Since then, she has played roles in other faith-based films, including I Can Only Imagine and Pure Flix's Indivisible, both of which were released in 2018.

In 2019, Carroll received the Golden Angel for "Excellent Young Performing Artist of U.S." at the.

American-British Institute Academy in Canada.

Subsequent to starring in the Erwin Brothers' I Can Only Imagine, Carroll became involved with their studio Kingdom Story Company, with the purpose of learning filmmaking. She, Jon Erwin, and Jon Gunn wrote the script of Kingdom's first production and Carroll's screenwriting debut, I Still Believe, which was released in March 2020.

== Personal life ==
Carroll is a devout Christian, and often speaks about her faith at religious events and conferences, and during interviews.

== Filmography ==
=== Film ===
Year	Title	Role	Notes
2006	When a Stranger Calls	Allison Mandrakis	
2006	The Santa Clause 3: The Escape Clause	Cocoa	
2007	Goldfish	Jenny	Short film
2007	Resident Evil: Extinction	White Queen	
2008	Swing Vote	Molly Johnson	
2009	Astro Boy	Widget (voice)	
2010	The Spy Next Door	Farren	
2010	Flipped	Juli Baker	
2010	Café	Elly	
2010	Roshambo	Madeline	Short film
2011	Mr. Popper's Penguins	Janie Popper	
2011	Machine Gun Preacher	Paige Childers	
2012	The Magic of Belle Isle	Willow O'Neil	
2012	Shit Italian Moms Say	Rosalie	Short film
2017	Zer0-Tolerance	Alyssa	
2018	I Can Only Imagine	Shannon	
2018	God Bless the Broken Road	Hannah	
2018	Indivisible	Amanda Bradley	
2018	Destined to Ride	Lily Davidson	also known as Pistachio
2020	I Still Believe	—N/a	Writer; also co-producer

=== Television ===
Year	Title	Role	Notes
2003	Cold Case	Gwen Deamer (1983)	Episode: "Gleen"
2005	Hidden Howie: The Private Life of a Public Nuisance	Riley Mandell	Pilot
2005	Night Stalker	Julie Medlock	Episode: "Pilot"
2005	Wanted	Irene	2 episodes
2006	All of Us	Elisabeth	Episode: "Domo Arigato, Mr. Roberto"
2006	Passions	Young Kay	Episode: "#1.1711"
2007	Lost	Annie	Episode: "The Man Behind the Curtain"
2008	High School Musical: Get in the Picture	Gabriela Montez	ABC Reality series
2008	Grey's Anatomy	Ivy Soltanoff	Episode: "In the Midnight Hour"
2009	Lie to Me	Samantha Burch	Episode: "Do No Harm"
2009	Cold Case	Hillary Rhodes (1963)	Episode: "November 22"
2009	The Cleaner	Sarah	Episode: "The Things We Didn't Plan"
2009	NCIS	Angela Kelp	Episode: "Child's Play"
2010	Private Practice	Maggie	Episode: "Triangles"
2011; 2013	R.L. Stine's The Haunting Hour	Audrey Miller / Jillian	2 episodes
2013	Blink	Ari Trask	Television film
2014	Scandal	Karen Grant	2 episodes
2018	Criminal Minds	Ally McCready	Episode: "The Tall Man"
2024	These Stones	McKenna	Main role
2026	The Pitt	Rita Wolcott	Episode: "8:00 P.M."
