= Freezer Burn (film) =

- Directed by: Charles Hood
- Written by: Charles Hood
- Produced by: Jillian Demmerle
- Starring: Robert Harriell; Michael Consiglio; Ivo Velon; Ella Rae Peck; Gray Taylor
- Cinematography: Adrian Correia
- Edited by: Grant Surmi
- Music by: Kevin Blumenfeld
- Distributed by: Vanguard Cinema
- Release date: February 1, 2007
- Running time: 94 minutes
- Country: United States
- Language: English

Freezer Burn is a 2007 independent film, written and directed by Charles Hood. The film tells the story of a brilliant scientist who falls for his wife's high school art student and, using the technology from his research, figures out a way for them to be together.

== Plot ==
Virgil is a 30-year-old scientist developing technology to permanently preserve human organs for transplantation. However, his obsession with his work takes a toll on his marriage.

Virgil's only distraction is Emma, a 14-year-old student in his wife's high school art class. His sanity hangs in the balance as he struggles to suppress his taboo attraction to the girl. Virgil decides to use his experimental technology to freeze himself, in order to align his age with the young girl's. But his plan doesn't turn out the way he'd hoped.

== Cast ==
- Robert Harriell
- Michael Consiglio
- Ivo Velon
- Blake Stamp
- CC Seymour
- Emma
- Ella Rae Peck

== Release ==
Freezer Burn premiered at the Park City Film Music Festival in Park City, Utah, on January 13, 2008. It was released on DVD and digital download on May 26, 2009.

== Reception ==
HorrorNews said, "The movie isn’t without its flaws but it felt like a labor of love and it shows."

== Awards ==
- Silver Medal Audience Award (Park City Film Music Festival)
- Best Feature (Flint Film Festival)
- Distinctive Achievement in Makeup and Production Design (Wild Rose Independent Film Festival)
- Best Screenplay (Kent Film Festival)
