= Get Big (film) =

- Directed by: Dylan Anthony Moran
- Written by: Dylan Anthony Moran
- Produced by: David Rudd
- Starring: Dylan Anthony Moran; Tanner Stine
- Cinematography: Matthew Troy
- Edited by: Alex Szabo
- Music by: Larry LaLonde; Bryan Mantia
- Production company: Pelican Club Pictures
- Release date: 31 August 2017
- Running time: 86 minutes
- Country: United States
- Language: English

Get Big is a 2017 American comedy-drama film directed by Dylan Anthony Moran, starring Moran and Tanner Stine.

== Cast ==
- Dylan Anthony Moran as Nate
- Tanner Stine as Alec Schaff
- Paulina Alvarez as Amy
- Scott Krinsky as Tommy
- Clifford Bañagale as Kahji
- Lisa Alvillar as Maria

== Reception ==
Gary Goldstein of the Los Angeles Times wrote that the film "whips up plenty of humor and charm as well as several organic, well-served life lessons."

Matthew Lickona of the San Diego Reader wrote that the film's "great virtue is its verisimilitude, followed by its gently crude humor, its affectionate heart, and its pleasantly surprising degree of polish."

Bradley Gibson of Film Threat rated the film 7 stars out of 10 and called it a "delightful romp with laugh-out-loud moments but also contains serious introspection about what adult life will be like for those now entering into it."
