= Flipped (novel) =

Book by Wendelin Van Draanen

- Cover of Flipped
- Author: Wendelin Van Draanen
- Original title: Flipped
- Language: English
- Genre: Young adult Romance novel Realistic Fiction
- Publisher: Random House
- Publication date: October 1, 2001
- Publication place: United States
- Media type: Print (hardback & paperback)
- Pages: 212
- ISBN: 0-439-64998-6
- OCLC: 54473063

Flipped (2001) is a young adult novel by Wendelin Van Draanen set from c.1994 to 2000. It is a stand-alone teen romance with the two protagonists alternately presenting their perspective on a shared set of events.

== Plot ==
Julianna 'Juli' Baker meets Bryce Loski two weeks before the beginning of second grade. Though Juli believes she is in love, Bryce is annoyed by her constant and persistent attention.

In elementary school, Juli becomes preoccupied with saving her beloved sycamore tree from being cut down. She spends hours up in the tree, but her protest is foiled when she is forcibly removed from her favourite perch. Unbeknownst to Juli, Bryce feels horrible about Juli's tree but does not know how or if he should bring it up with her. Matters are not helped when Bryce's grandfather takes a liking to Juli and starts pestering Bryce to be friends with her.

Things with Juli start to change when Juli begins giving Bryce and his family weekly batches of chicken eggs from the hens she raises in her yard. Bryce’s family worries that because Juli’s yard has always been very messy the eggs may contain salmonella. Bryce's father tells him to stop accepting eggs from Juli, but rather than risk hurting Juli’s feelings, Bryce ends up throwing the eggs away every morning. Despite his efforts, Juli accidentally discovers what Bryce’s family thinks about her and her eggs. Her feelings for Bryce deteriorate even further when she overhears him talking to a classmate about her mentally challenged uncle. Juli, furious and hurt, decides to abandon every thought of Bryce.

Bryce, meanwhile, has started to notice and like Juli more and more, especially after he finds an old article about Juli's protest for her tree. At a dinner party his family organizes, he attempts to explain to Juli that he wasn’t trying to make fun of her uncle, but she refuses to listen to his excuses. Bryce finally confronts Juli and attempts to kiss her at an auctioned lunch date both of them attend. Juli throws him off, mortified, and goes home to hide from Bryce’s attempts to contact her. Bryce makes a last attempt to win Juli’s heart by planting a sycamore tree in her backyard. When Juli realizes what he is doing, she knows that he has actually changed and decides to give him a second chance.

== Film adaptation ==
A film adaptation from Castle Rock Entertainment and Warner Bros. Pictures was released in the United States on August 6, 2010. Rob Reiner directed the film.

Callan McAuliffe plays Bryce, while Madeline Carroll stars as Juli. Aidan Quinn and Penelope Ann Miller are Juli's parents; Kevin Weisman plays the role of Juli's mentally disabled Uncle, while Shane Harper and Michael Bolten play her two brothers. Anthony Edwards and Rebecca De Mornay play Bryce's parents, and John Mahoney takes role of his grandfather, Chet.

Flipped was filmed in Ann Arbor, Manchester, and Saline, all located in Michigan. As part of the set, a temporary house was built on the Thurston Nature Area prairie. A few scenes were filmed in the small downtown area of Manchester, Michigan on July 27. The events take place in 1957–1963 in the screenplay instead of 1994–2000, as in the book.

== Critical reception ==
- "Van Draanen has another winner in this eighth-grade 'he-said, she-said' romance." – School Library Journal, Starred
- "We flipped over this fantastic book, its gutsy girl Juli and its wise, wonderful ending." – The Chicago Tribune
- "A highly agreeable romantic comedy." – Kirkus Reviews
- "Delightful! Delicious! And totally teen." – Book Page

== Awards and nominations ==
- 2003
  - Won: Virginia Young Readers Program Award
  - Won: South Carolina Children's Book Award
- 2004
  - Won: California Young Reader Medal
  - Won: Nevada Young Readers Award
  - Nominated: Illinois Rebecca Caudill Young Readers' Book Academy
