= Craftsy =

American video on demand service

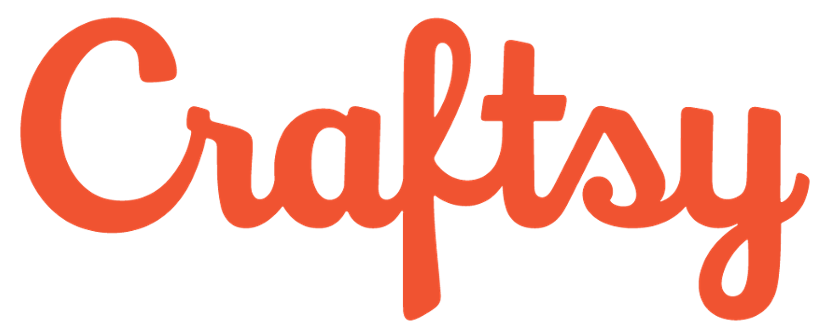
- Founded: April 2010; 16 years ago
- Headquarters: Denver, Colorado
- Parent: TN Marketing
- Website: www.craftsy.com

Craftsy, previously named Bluprint, is an American subscription video on demand service owned by TN Marketing. The service features online courses and other forms of video content surrounding crafts, hobbies, and lifestyle topics, as well as an online store that sells craft supplies and project kits that tie into the service's video content.

The service was originally launched in 2011, primarily focused on offering online video courses on crafts-oriented topics, as well as selling crafts products. Within a year, Craftsy had attracted over half a million enrollments. In 2017, the site was acquired by NBCUniversal Direct-to-Consumer and Digital Enterprises; the following year, Craftsy launched a new over-the-top video platform known as Bluprint, which expanded to include other lifestyle-oriented topics beyond crafts, as well as increased synergies with NBCUniversal media properties. Craftsy was merged entirely into Bluprint in January 2019. Bluprint assets were acquired by TN Marketing in July 2020, which launched a new site, reverted to Craftsy, later in the year.

== History ==
Sympoz Inc. was founded in April 2010 by former eBay executives John Levinsay and Josh Scott, Yahoo executive Andrew Rogers, Todd Tobin and Bret Hanna. It raised $15 million in an angel round of funding from Access Venture Partners, Foundry Group, Harrison Metal and Tiger Global Management, launching the website just over a year later. By September 2012, the company estimated that an average of 1,600 people a day were signing up for Craftsy courses.

In November 2014, Craftsy raised $50 million in its fourth round of financing, bringing the company's total funding to almost $100 million. NBCUniversal Cable Entertainment Group agreed to purchase a majority stake in the company from equity firms in May 2017. In November 2017, Catherine Balsam-Schwaber was hired as the general manager of Craftsy, after formerly serving as chief creative officer at Mattel Creations.

In July 2018, Craftsy re-launched its subscription video service Craftsy Unlimited as Bluprint, expanding its how-to content to cover a wider array of hobbies and lifestyle topics that "promote and facilitate self-expression", including content such as Re:Fashion with actress Marcy Harriell; Hip-Hop Grooves With tWitch with dancer Stephen "tWitch" Boss (of The Ellen DeGeneres Show fame) and Barneys New York ambassador Simon Doonan, among others; Ready, Set, Grill, co-hosted by Today anchor Al Roker and Mike Abdoo; and Spark, a series hosted by Top Chef's Padma Lakshmi that profile artists "redefining the creative landscape". NBCUniversal president of strategy and commercial growth Dave Howe referred to the service as being a "Netflix" for hobbies and lifestyle learning. Craftsy continued to operate as a secondary website until January 2019, when it was fully merged into Bluprint.

== Acquisition ==
In a 22 May 2020 letter to the city of Denver, a Bluprint official announced that Bluprint was closing permanently and would lay off its 137 employees in July and August. A note penned by founder and CEO John Levisay was posted to the company's website, stating "I am disappointed to inform you that Bluprint will be closing over the next few months, like so many customers, instructors, designers, and employees, I am devastated by this news." Levisay's note did not address why the company is folding, but in a separate letter to instructors on the site, he characterized it as an NBCUniversal decision, according to an industry association.

In July 2020, TN Marketing acquired Bluprint's assets. The rebranded Craftsy website relaunched in September 2020.
