= Wes Brown (actor) =

American actor

- Born: James Wesley Brown; January 26, 1982 (age 44); Fort Worth, Texas, U.S.
- Education: Louisiana State University
- Occupation: Actor
- Years active: 2005–present
- Spouse: Amanda Moye Brown (m. 2008)
- Children: 1

James Wesley Brown (born January 26, 1982) is an American actor.

== Life and career ==
Brown was born in Fort Worth, Texas and raised in Baton Rouge, Louisiana. He attended Louisiana State University. He is married to Amanda; they live in Los Angeles with their daughter.

Brown played Luke McDonald in season two of HBO's True Blood. He is also known for recurring roles as Judson Lyons in Hart of Dixie and as Ryan Kerrigan in Private Practice. Brown has starred in 22 Hallmark Channel films, including Love's Everlasting Courage and Love Begins, in 2011 Christmas Cookies in 2016 and "Christmas at Graceland" in 2018. "Wedding at Graceland" in 2019. He also appeared on CSI: Miami, Criminal Minds, NCIS, Scandal and Desperate Housewives.

In 2012 Brown was cast as series regular on the NBC primetime show Deception as Julian Bowers. He also played the recurring role of Taylor in the fifth season of The CW's 90210.

In 2016 Brown made a guest appearance as Gaston on Once Upon a Time.

== Filmography ==
Film
Year	Title	Role	Notes
2006	Glory Road	Pat Riley	
2006	We Are Marshall	Chris Griffen	
2008	Noble Things	Bo	
2008	Lockjaw: Rise of the Kulev Serpent	Kelly	Direct-to-DVD
2011	Love Begins	Clark Davis	Hallmark Channel Television film
2011	Love's Everlasting Courage	Clark Davis	Hallmark Channel Television film
2011	Love's Christmas Journey	Clark Davis	Hallmark Channel Television Film
2011	Storm War	Jacob Grange	
2012	Wyatt Earp's Revenge	Ed	Direct-to-DVD
2012	Future Starts Slow	Homeless man	Short film
2013	Shadow on the Mesa	Wes Rawlins	Hallmark Movie Channel Television film
2014	June in January	Alex Blackwell	Hallmark Channel Television film
2015	Love Under the Stars	Nate	Hallmark Channel Television film
2016	Christmas Cookies	Jake Carter	Hallmark Channel Television film
2017	Christmas in Mississippi	Mike	Lifetime Channel Television film
2018	Under the Autumn Moon	Josh	Hallmark Channel Television film
2018	Christmas at Graceland	Clay	Hallmark Channel Television film
2019	Wedding at Graceland	Clay	Hallmark Channel Television film
2019	Over The Moon In Love	Devin Knight	Hallmark Channel Television film
2019	Check Inn to Christmas	Ryan Mason	Hallmark Channel Television film
2020	A Nashville Christmas Carol	Gavin	Hallmark Channel Television film
2021	Sweet Pecan Summer	J. P. Milligan	Hallmark Channel Television film
2021	Every Time a Bell Rings	Liam	Hallmark Channel Television film
2022	My Southern Family Christmas	Victor	Hallmark Channel Television film
2022	Haul Out the Holly	Jared	Hallmark Channel Television film
2023	Haul out the Holly: Lit Up	Jared	Hallmark Channel Television film
2023	A Biltmore Christmas	Charlie	Hallmark Channel Television film
2024	Autumn at Apple Hill	Luke	Hallmark Channel Television film
2024	Deck the Walls	Brysen	Hallmark Channel Television film
2025	Haul Out the Halloween	Jared	Hallmark Channel Television film

Television
Year	Title	Role	Notes
2005	Beach Girls	Billy	Miniseries
2007	CSI: Miami	Brian Partney	Episode: "Permanent Vacation"
2009	True Blood	Luke McDonald	7 episodes
2009–10	Trauma	Casey Landers	3 episodes
2009	Criminal Minds	Joe Belser	Episode: "The Slave of Duty"
2011	NCIS	Marine First Lieutenant Jeremy Nolan	Episode: "Ships in the Night"
2011	Private Practice	Ryan Kerrigan	3 episodes
2011–12	Hart of Dixie	Dr. Judson Lyons	4 episodes
2012	Scandal	Sully St. James	Episode: "Sweet Baby"
2012	Desperate Housewives	Dr. Bailey	Episode: "Finishing the Hat"
2012	90210	Taylor	5 episodes
2013	Deception	Julian Bowers	Main cast; 11 episodes
2014	NCIS: New Orleans	Navy Chief Petty Officer Phil Martino	Episode: "Love Hurts"
2016	Once Upon a Time	Gaston	Guest role (Season 5) Episode: "Her Handsome Hero"
2017	Twin Peaks	Darren	Guest role
