= Wendelin Van Draanen =

American writer

Wendelin Van Draanen /ˈwɛndəlɪn væn ˈdrɑːnən/ (born January 6, 1965) is an American writer of children's and young-adult fiction.

== Early life ==
Van Draanen was born in Chicago, Illinois. One of her very early influences was Dandelion Wine by Ray Bradbury. She stated the book was "about the magic of growing up and reminded me of all the wonderful mischief my brothers and I got into when we were young". Bradbury's work inspired Van Draanen to write How I Survived Being a Girl, which was published by HarperCollins in 1997. Other early influences include Nancy Drew, The Hardy Boys, and Encyclopedia Brown.

Van Draanen is the daughter of two chemists who immigrated from the Netherlands. In college, the Van Draanen family business was burned down, leading to financial hardship. Wendelin turned to writing to alleviate stress and she published her first book in 1997, titled How I Survived Being a Girl.

== Writing career ==
Before she became a full-time writer she was a high school math teacher and computer science teacher.

Van Draanen lives in San Luis Obispo, California, with her husband Mark Parsons and two sons, Colton and Connor.

Sammy Keyes and the Hotel Thief, which inaugurated the Sammy Keyes series in 1998, won the Edgar Allan Poe Award for Best Juvenile Mystery from the Mystery Writers of America in 1999. The eighteen-book series follows the adventures of a disenfranchised teen as she navigates middle school and life.

Runaway, a companion book to the Sammy Keyes series, is about a girl named Holly who tries to escape from her latest foster home.

From 2004 to 2006 Van Draanen wrote Shredderman, a four-book series for younger readers about a fifth grade boy who assumes a secret online identity to help him win a battle against the school bully Bubba Bixby.

She also wrote the standalone teen romance Flipped in a he-said she-said style, with the two protagonists alternately presenting their perspective on a shared set of events. The two protagonists Bryce and Julianna are neighbors. The book was made into a Warner Brothers feature film directed by Rob Reiner in 2010.

In 2017, Van Draanen won the Josette Frank Award for fiction from the Children's Book Committee (CBC) of Bank Street College of Education for The Secret Life of Lincoln Jones (Knopf Books for Young Readers). In summarizing the plot, the Committee wrote, "When eleven-year-old Lincoln's mom, escaping an abusive boyfriend, gets a job with dementia patients, Lincoln uncovers the humanity lurking behind their illnesses." It also appeared on the CBC's Best Children's Book of the Year list with Outstanding Merit. Additional books that have appeared on the committee's Best Books list include, Sammy Keyes and the Curse of Moustache Mary, Sammy Keyes and the Hollywood Mummy, Shredderman, Runaway, The Gecko & Sticky, The Gecko & Sticky: Villains Lair, The Running Dream, Wild Bird, The Peach Rebellion (Outstanding Merit), and Mr. Whiskers and the Shenanigan Sisters.

WorldCat participating libraries report works by and about Wendelin Van Draanen that encompass roughly 70+ works in 370+ publications in 12 languages and 51,000+ library holdings.

== Books ==
=== Shredderman series ===
- Shredderman 1: Secret Identity (2004)
- Shredderman 2: Attack of the Tagger (2005)
- Shredderman 3: Meet the Gecko (2005)
- Shredderman 4: Enemy Spy (2006)

=== Sammy Keyes series ===
The Sammy Keyes series has been published by Knopf imprints of Random House, with 18 books in total.

- Sammy Keyes and the Hotel Thief (Aug 1998) – 1999 Edgar Award, Best Juvenile Mystery
- Sammy Keyes and the Skeleton Man (Apr 1998)
- Sammy Keyes and the Sisters of Mercy (Oct 1999)
- Sammy Keyes and the Runaway Elf (May 2000)
- Sammy Keyes and the Curse of Moustache Mary (Feb 2001) – Edgar nominee, Best Juvenile
- Sammy Keyes and the Hollywood Mummy (May 2002)
- Sammy Keyes and the Search for Snake Eyes (Apr 2003) – Edgar nominee, Best Juvenile
- Sammy Keyes and the Art of Deception (2003) – Edgar nominee, Best Juvenile
- Sammy Keyes and the Psycho Kitty Queen (Apr 2006)
- Sammy Keyes and the Dead Giveaway (2005)
- Sammy Keyes and the Wild Things (May 2007) – Edgar nominee, Best Juvenile
- Sammy Keyes and the Cold Hard Cash (Oct 2008)
- Sammy Keyes and the Wedding Crasher (Oct 2010)
- Sammy Keyes and the Night of Skulls (Oct 2011)
- Sammy Keyes and the Power of Justice Jack (Jul 2012)
- Sammy Keyes and the Showdown in Sin City (Jan 2013)
- Sammy Keyes and the Killer Cruise (Sep 2013)
- Sammy Keyes and the Kiss Goodbye (Sep 2014)

=== The Gecko & Sticky series ===
- The Gecko & Sticky: Villain's Lair (Feb 10, 2009)
- The Gecko & Sticky: The Greatest Power (May 26, 2009)
- The Gecko & Sticky: Sinister Substitute (Jan 12, 2010)
- The Gecko & Sticky: The Power Potion (Jun 08, 2010)

=== Non-series ===
- How I Survived Being a Girl (1997)
- Flipped (2001) – adapted as the 2010 feature film Flipped
- Swear to Howdy (2003)
- Runaway (2006), based on a character introduced in the Sammy Keyes series – Lone Star Book List, 2007–08
- Confessions of a Serial Kisser (2008)
- The Running Dream (2011) – Lone Star Book List, 2011 Dorothy Canfield Fisher Children's Book Award, 2013
- The Secret Life of Lincoln Jones (2016)
- Wild Bird (2017)
- The Peach Rebellion (2022)

== Filmography ==
- Shredderman Rules (2007)
- Flipped (2010)
- Sammy Keyes, television series

== See also ==
- Shredderman Rules, TV adaptation of the Shredderman series
