= Gossip Girl season 6 =

2012 season of television series

Gossip Girl
- Season 6
- DVD cover art
- Showrunner: Stephanie Savage
- Starring: Blake Lively; Leighton Meester; Penn Badgley; Chace Crawford; Ed Westwick; Kaylee DeFer; Kelly Rutherford; Matthew Settle
- No. of episodes: 10

Release
- Original network: The CW
- Original release: October 8 – December 17, 2012

Season chronology
- ← Previous; Season 5

The sixth and final season of the American teen drama television series Gossip Girl premiered on The CW on October 8, 2012, and concluded on December 17, 2012, consisting of 10 episodes. Due to a decline in viewers and ratings in the show's previous seasons, the show was given a reduced episode count for the final season in order to bring the storyline to a close. Based on the novel series of the same name by Cecily von Ziegesar, the series was developed for television by Josh Schwartz and Stephanie Savage. The CW officially renewed the series for a sixth season on May 11, 2012. The series finale was preceded by a special retrospective, including interviews with the cast and crew.

== Plot ==
As the scandal and drama filled group of friends are entering adulthood, major questions about the future begin to emerge. Serena van der Woodsen decides to start fresh by dating an older man, Steven Spence, whose 17-year-old daughter is secretly dating Nate Archibald. Waiting to be together, Blair Waldorf and Chuck Bass try to succeed separately in their own careers. As The Spectator hits financial ruins, Nate considers a political career. Dan Humphrey and Georgina Sparks strike an unlikely friendship as she assists him with his new book. After five years of upheaval, Gossip Girl has saved her most juiciest, jaw dropping blast for last: Her identity.

== Cast and characters ==
=== Main ===
- Blake Lively as Serena van der Woodsen
- Leighton Meester as Blair Waldorf
- Penn Badgley as Dan Humphrey
- Chace Crawford as Nate Archibald
- Ed Westwick as Chuck Bass
- Kaylee DeFer as Ivy Dickens
- Kelly Rutherford as Lily van der Woodsen
- Matthew Settle as Rufus Humphrey
- Kristen Bell as the voice of Gossip Girl (uncredited)

=== Recurring ===
- Sofia Black-D'Elia as Sage Spence
- Robert John Burke as Bart Bass
- Barry Watson as Steven Spence
- Michelle Trachtenberg as Georgina Sparks
- Yin Chang as Nelly Yuki
- Tamara Feldman as Poppy Lifton
- Zuzanna Szadkowski as Dorota Kishlovsky
- Alice Callahan as Jessica Leitenberg
- Nan Zhang as Kati Farkas
- Margaret Colin as Eleanor Waldorf
- William Baldwin as William van der Woodsen
- Sam Robards as Howard Archibald
- Desmond Harrington as Jack Bass
- Wallace Shawn as Cyrus Rose

=== Special guests ===
- Connor Paolo as Eric van der Woodsen
- Taylor Momsen as Jenny Humphrey
- Alexa Chung as herself
- Michael Bloomberg as himself
- Lisa Loeb as herself
- Ella Rae Peck as Lola Rhodes (uncredited)
- Jessica Szohr as Vanessa Abrams (uncredited)
- Katie Cassidy as Juliet Sharp (uncredited)
- Willa Holland as Agnes Andrews (uncredited)
- Rachel Bilson as herself (uncredited)

== Episodes ==
No. overall	No. in season	Title	Directed by	Written by	Original release date	U.S. viewers (millions)
112	1	"Gone Maybe Gone"	Mark Piznarski	Josh Schwartz & Stephanie Savage	October 8, 2012	0.78
After returning home form their respective summers away, Nate, Blair, Chuck, Georgina and Dan begin a manhunt for Serena who's gone missing. After their little fling, Blair and Chuck make a pact. Nate and the spectator begins to have troubles. Georgina and Dan team up to write the perfect sequel to his book. Title reference: The 2007 film Gone Baby Gone.
113	2	"High Infidelity"	Joe Lazarov	Annemarie Navar-Gill	October 15, 2012	0.78
Trying to prove herself in adult society, Serena hosts the Central Park Conservancy's big gala, and she and Nate both learn something shocking about their significant others. Blair prepares to debut her new fashion line, but a rival from her past holds the key to her future. With Georgina’s help, Dan lands some meetings with publishers, but he must decide if he is willing to sacrifice his integrity in order to get his work published. Meanwhile, Chuck tries to persuade Amira to help him look into his father's past, even if it means jeopardizing Lily and Bart's relationship. Title reference: The 2000 film High Fidelity.
114	3	"Dirty Rotten Scandals"	Bart Wenrich	Natalie Krinsky	October 22, 2012	0.95
Feeling the pressure to make her first Waldorf Designs fashion show a success, Blair must rely on help from an unlikely source, but some unexpected scheming causes a scandal on the runway. Serena discovers that befriending Steven's daughter Sage is trickier than she thought, especially when she is forced to put her issues with Blair aside to make Sage happy. Nate publishes Dan's first serialized article causing a stir and producing a serious threat. Meanwhile, Chuck begins to look into the clue that Amira left behind, which may help uncover what Bart is hiding. Title reference: The 1988 film Dirty Rotten Scoundrels.
115	4	"Portrait of a Lady Alexander"	Andy Wolk	Matt Whitney	November 5, 2012	0.66
Chuck's continued investigation into his father's dealings leads him to an unlikely event with Manhattan's elite, where he hopes to find the one person who can tell him the truth about Bart. Serena and Steven decide to reveal their romantic histories so they are not surprised about anything, but neither was prepared for what they uncovered. With The Spectator in jeopardy after Dan decided to publish elsewhere, Nate must make a difficult decision to keep it in business. Meanwhile, Georgina pushes Dan to choose a worthy person to date to boost his image, but he finds himself drawn in a different direction. Elsewhere, Ivy tries to persuade Rufus to go through and unpack boxes with all of his stuff that Lily had sent over to the loft after he moved out. Title reference: The 1996 film The Portrait of a Lady.
116	5	"Monstrous Ball"	Amy Heckerling	Sara Goodman	November 12, 2012	0.73
After her mother gives Blair an ultimatum, Blair is determined to remedy Waldorf Designs' problems by making a splash with a dress at the upcoming cotillion, but a shocking revelation at the ball affects everyone. Serena becomes worried about Steven's attitude toward her, but after some investigating she discovers the surprising reason why. Sage learns that her father plans to propose marriage to Serena and plots an all-out attack to destroy the engagement once and for all despite the risk of endangering her relationship with Nate. Chuck finds an unlikely ally in Ivy as he tries to drive a wedge between Bart and Lily's relationship to help expose his father's secret. Meanwhile, Dan publishes another article, but the effect is just the opposite of what he was hoping for as Georgina continues to pressure him to publish more. Elsewhere, Rufus learns about Ivy's inheritance as she continues to help him rebuild his life. Title reference: The 2001 film Monster's Ball.
117	6	"Where the Vile Things Are"	Norman Buckley	Dan Steele	November 19, 2012	0.72
Blair gets ready for her mother's imminent arrival, but is unprepared for the set of demands her mother puts upon her. Serena volunteers to help Dan find a new place to live, but their time together brings up unexpected emotions. With Ivy's help, Chuck discovers that there is evidence incriminating his father in illegal activities and enlists the help of Nate to retrieve it. Meanwhile, Rufus and Ivy are excited about their art gallery opening until they find an empty RSVP list and must find another way to make the event a success. Title reference: The 2009 film Where the Wild Things Are.
118	7	"Save the Last Chance"	Anna Mastro	Jessica Queller	November 26, 2012	0.84
Serena and Dan realize that they need to make amends with the people they have wronged to rebuild their shattered lives. Blair has one last chance to prove her worth as a fashion designer and, with Serena's help, comes up with a plan to make her line the "it" look for Sage and her friends. Chuck is close to getting the evidence he needs against his father, until one of his closest allies reveals his plan to Bart. Title reference: The 2001 film Save the Last Dance.
119	8	"It's Really Complicated"	John Stephens	Jake Coburn	December 3, 2012	0.79
Serena and Dan decide to throw their first Thanksgiving dinner together, inviting only their closest friends, but everyone seems to have their own agenda for attending. Serena has a run-in and invites both Steven and Sage to the dinner, while Lily and Bart also crash the event which fuels the tension between everyone. Feeling defeated by his father, Chuck begins a downward spiral, leaving Blair to find a solution to his problems. Meanwhile, Dan has written his latest exposé, but he must make a tough decision whether to publish it, knowing it could destroy a close friendship with Serena and everyone else that he knows. Title reference: The 2009 film It's Complicated.
120	9	"The Revengers"	Patrick Norris	Sara Goodman & Natalie Krinsky	December 10, 2012	1.06
After a run-in with an increasingly paranoid Bart, Blair grows concerned for Chuck's safety. Feeling confident that his father will never hurt him, Chuck makes a deal that could change his life. Blair devises a plan with the help of Serena, Georgina, Sage, and Ivy to get what they need out of Bart. Meanwhile, Nate's financial dilemma lands him in a place that he never thought he would be: jail. In the end, Chuck is escorted by Bart's security to the roof of a building. Minutes later Bart joins him. Blair, alarmed at not being able to locate Chuck, asks around for him and races up to the roof as well. A fight ensues between Chuck and Bart. Blair arrives just in time to see Bart hanging off the side of the building. Chuck refuses to help him up for fear that he would harm his friends or himself. The episode ends with Bart falling and Blair and Chuck running off. Title reference: The 2012 film The Avengers.
121	10	"New York, I Love You XOXO"	Mark Piznarski	Stephanie Savage	December 17, 2012	1.55
Serena decides to come back to New York and confront Dan about the "Serena Chapter". Chuck proposes to Blair when he is implicated in the death of Bart. Georgina joins forces with Jack Bass in one last scheme to help Chuck and Blair. Nate and Sage try to find the identity of Gossip Girl with the information that they have. William van der Woodsen returns to comfort Lily and rejects Ivy who finally realizes that William used her just to win Lily back. Dorota, Eleanor, and Cyrus also become involved in planning Chuck and Blair's improvised wedding. Various characters from previous seasons make cameos, including Vanessa, Juliet, Agnes, and Lola. Kristen Bell has a cameo as herself alongside Rachel Bilson. Dan is revealed to be Gossip Girl. Five years later: The group gathers for Dan and Serena's wedding. Eric and Jenny are both in attendance as are Eleanor and Cyrus Rose, who is delivering the vows. Nate has become successful with The Spectator and will likely run for Mayor of New York City. Chuck and Blair are still married and have a four-year-old son named Henry Bass. Ivy has written a best-selling autobiography titled Ivy League which has been adapted into a major Hollywood feature film with her as the screenwriter and starring Olivia Burke and Lola Rhodes as the Serena and Ivy/Charlie characters. Georgina and Jack have gotten together, Lily and William are finally back together, and Rufus is with Lisa Loeb. In the final shot, a new generation of wealthy Upper East Siders are seen at Constance as a new lonely boy walks past his classmates, denoting the beginning of a brand-new Gossip Girl. Title reference: The 2009 film New York, I Love You.

== Production ==
On May 11, 2012, the series was picked up for a short sixth and final season, beginning in October and concluding on December 17. On May 17, 2012, with the reveal of The CW's 2012–13 television schedule, Gossip Girl stayed on Monday night and moved to the 9:00 pm Eastern/8:00 pm Central timeslot following the fifth season of 90210. It was announced on July 30, 2012, that the sixth season would have 10 episodes.

On April 25, 2012, it was confirmed that former showrunner and executive producer Joshua Safran left the show as he had become the new showrunner of NBC's Smash. On May 11, 2012, writer Sara Goodman was promoted to executive producer.

On October 29, the fourth episode of the season, "Portrait of a Lady Alexander", was rescheduled for November 5, due to Hurricane Sandy.

The final season was mainly filmed in various areas of New York City, with prominent locations including the Bethesda Fountain in Central Park, The Empire Hotel, and the Metropolitan Museum of Art.

=== Cast ===
Blake Lively, Leighton Meester, Penn Badgley, Chace Crawford, Ed Westwick, Kaylee DeFer, Kelly Rutherford, and Matthew Settle all returned as series regulars. Michelle Trachtenberg was upgraded to a guest-starring role for this season. Former recurring stars Desmond Harrington and Robert John Burke also returned as guest stars for the season.

On July 7, 2012, actress Andrea Gabriel, known for her role on Lost, had been cast as a businesswoman from Dubai. 7th Heaven alum Barry Watson landed a guest-starring role as young entrepreneur Steven Spence, who becomes romantically involved with Serena.

British model Alexa Chung appears as herself in a plot involving Blair's new fashion line. Former Skins star Sofia Black-D'Elia was seen filming scenes with Lively for the then-upcoming sixth season. She played the role of Sage Spence, Steven's daughter.

Former Gossip Girl guest stars Tamara Feldman and Yin Chang were reported to return to the show for its final season as Poppy Lifton and Nelly Yuki, respectively. Taylor Momsen and Connor Paolo reprised their roles as Jenny Humphrey and Eric van der Woodsen for the series finale, who had not been seen since their departures in season 4.

Kristen Bell, Rachel Bilson, Katie Cassidy, Ella Rae Peck, Willa Holland, Lisa Loeb, Michael Bloomberg and Jessica Szohr had cameo roles in the series finale. The cameos from these individuals occurred at the end of the last episode of the season, after Gossip Girl's identity was revealed.

== Ratings ==
No.	Title	Air date	Rating/share (18–49)	Viewers (million)
1	"Gone Maybe Gone"	October 8, 2012	0.4/1	0.78
2	"High Infidelity"	October 15, 2012	0.4/1	0.78
3	"Dirty Rotten Scandals"	October 22, 2012	0.4/1	0.95
4	"Portrait of a Lady Alexander"	November 5, 2012	0.3/1	0.66
5	"Monstrous Ball"	November 12, 2012	0.4/1	0.73
6	"Where the Vile Things Are"	November 19, 2012	0.4/1	0.72
7	"Save the Last Chance"	November 26, 2012	0.4/1	0.84
8	"It's Really Complicated"	December 3, 2012	0.3/1	0.79
9	"The Revengers"	December 10, 2012	0.6/1	1.06
10	"New York, I Love You XOXO"	December 17, 2012	0.8/2	1.55

== Reception ==
On Rotten Tomatoes, the sixth season holds an approval rating of 60% based on five reviews, with an average rating of 5.3/10.

== DVD release ==
Gossip Girl: The Complete Sixth and Final Season
Set Details		Special Features	
10 Episodes; 3-Disc Set; English (Dolby Digital 5.1); Subtitles in English SDH, Spanish and French; Runtime: 422 minutes		A Big Farewell and XOXO to Our Upper East Siders: Gossip Girl cast and crew bid farewell to this successful and scandalous series.; Gossip Girl XOXO: Series Retrospective Special.; Gossip Girl Prequel: "It Had to Be You" - Audiobook Download; Gag Reel; Unaired Scenes	
Release Dates
Region 1	Region 2	Region 3	Region 4
February 12, 2013	February 18, 2013	July 19, 2013	February 27, 2013
