= Last Tango, Then Paris =

- Gossip Girl episode
- Episode no.: Season 3 Episode 22
- Directed by: J. Miller Tobin
- Written by: Josh Safran; Stephanie Savage
- Production code: 322
- Original air date: May 17, 2010

Guest appearances
- Margaret Colin as Eleanor Waldorf-Rose; Connor Paolo as Eric van der Woodsen; Wallace Shawn as Cyrus Rose; Zuzanna Szadkowski as Dorota Kishlovsky; Michelle Trachtenberg as Georgina Sparks; Ben Yannette as Cameron; Aaron Schwartz as Vanya

Episode chronology
← Previous "Ex-Husbands and Wives"	Next → "Belles de Jour"
- Gossip Girl season 3

"Last Tango, Then Paris" is the 22nd and final episode of the third season of the American teen drama television series Gossip Girl. The episode was written by Joshua Safran and Stephanie Savage and directed by J. Miller Tobin. It originally aired on The CW in the United States on May 17, 2010.

== Plot ==
Georgina arrives at Grand Central Station, disguised in a blonde wig and sunglasses. Jenny takes a picture of Dan and Serena sleeping in the same bed and sends it to Gossip Girl, upsetting Nate when he sees it. Blair tries avoiding Chuck and the Empire State Building but soon realizes it is impossible to stay away and that they belong together. However, at the moment she decides to go, Dorota's water breaks and she is rushed to the hospital. At the hospital, Dorota tells Blair to follow her heart and gives her her blessing. Soon afterward, Dorota and Vanya welcome their baby daughter, Anastasia, and choose Eleanor and Cyrus as the baby's godparents. Outside of the hospital, Blair gets to the Empire State Building too late and finds that Chuck has left.

Meanwhile, Jenny goes to Chuck's hotel to hang out with Nate but instead finds a desolate Chuck drowning his sorrows by getting drunk; Jenny joins him as she is also depressed and has hit rock bottom. Eventually, the two have sex and Jenny loses her virginity. Right after they have sex, Blair walks in and tells Chuck she loves him, as Jenny sneaks out from the bedroom undetected by Blair. Back at the hospital, Dan and Serena discuss the events of the previous night and their "meaningless kiss", but Nate overhears them, and in spite, decides to send Vanessa the picture, causing problems for Dan and Vanessa. Later, Nate is seen with Serena at the restaurant in Dorota's hospital, and he forgives her but she tells him that they should break up, or take a break for a while so she can work on herself. However, Nate is angry and hurt and tells her that he is done waiting for her. Jenny reaches the hospital and has an emotional breakdown and is comforted by Eric, who asks her what the problem is and she confesses that she slept with Chuck. Meanwhile, Chuck and Blair are happier than ever and just as Chuck is about to ask her to marry him, Dan comes and punches him. He is confronted by Dan, and Blair realizes what happened between Chuck and Jenny. She then proceeds to banish Jenny from New York and tells Chuck to never speak to her again.

A week later, Nate apologizes to Dan for sending the picture to Vanessa and tells him that he and Serena are over and proceeds to have a threesome as he has taken Chuck's Black Book. Dan calls Serena immediately after, only to discover that she and Blair are on their way to Paris. Just as he is looking at tickets for Air France, Georgina walks in and tells him that she is pregnant with his son. Meanwhile, Jenny is being seen off by Rufus, Lily and Eric as she leaves for her mother's house in Hudson.

As an intoxicated Chuck exits a bar in Prague, he is suddenly grabbed by muggers who proceed to rob him. He tells them to take him to a bank and he will give them money, but they instead pull out a box from his jacket with an engagement ring in it (showing that Chuck was going to propose to Blair). He tells them he will give them anything besides the box, and as he lunges out for it, one of the muggers shoots him. The muggers flee as Chuck lays on the ground.

== Reception ==
"Last Tango, Then Paris" had received mixed to positive reviews from critics and was viewed by a live audience of 1.96 million viewers. Michael Ausiello from Entertainment Weekly had praised all of Leighton Meester's and Taylor Momsen's performances in the episode by saying "Leighton Meester never better!". L.J. Gibbs, from TV Fanatic, gave the episode a 3.5 rating star out of 5, and said that he felt that Chuck being shot at the end of the episode was a very "cheap move by the writers", and that the storyline involving Chuck and Jenny having sex was very "unlikely". He praised Dorota's storyline by saying that "watching her become a mom was really sweet, even if all the characters showing up there was a big stretch". Mark O. Estes, from TV Overmind, had also praised Taylor Momsen's performance in the episode and said that he "wish that Jenny had of gotten her own spin-off", and questions that if her send-off in this episode means that the show's writers have a "Katherine Heigl" situation on their hands". Jennifer Sankowski, from TV Guide, felt that the storyline about Serena and Dan waking up in the same bed and Jenny sending the photo had "tended to drag". She said that she loved Blair's smackdows on Jenny, and had also compared many scenes with the pilot episode. Jacob, from Television Without Pity, had praised that the episode had "run those stories into each other at top speed". Television Without Pity also included the episode in its gallery of "Season Finales 2010: The Best and Worst" and declared it one of the best, further adding that "[...]we're completely satisfied. Throw in Chuck being mugged and left for dead in Amsterdam's red light district and Nate whoring it up and we're totally willing to take some roofies and forget the mess most of this season has been."
