= New York, I Love You XOXO =

- Gossip Girl episode
- Episode no.: Season 6 Episode 10
- Directed by: Mark Piznarski
- Written by: Stephanie Savage
- Original air date: December 17, 2012
- Running time: 41 minutes

Guest appearances
- Taylor Momsen as Jenny Humphrey; Michelle Trachtenberg as Georgina Sparks; William Baldwin as William van der Woodsen; Margaret Colin as Eleanor Waldorf; Wallace Shawn as Cyrus Rose; Zuzanna Szadkowski as Dorota Kishlovsky; Desmond Harrington as Jack Bass; Connor Paolo as Eric van der Woodsen; Sofia Black-D'Elia as Sage Spence; Michael Bloomberg as himself; Lisa Loeb as herself; Alex Bento as Henry Bass; Uncredited: Ella Rae Peck as Lola Rhodes; Jessica Szohr as Vanessa Abrams; Katie Cassidy as Juliet Sharp; Willa Holland as Agnes Andrews; Kristen Bell as herself; Rachel Bilson as herself

Episode chronology
| ← Previous "The Revengers" | Next → — |
- Gossip Girl season 6

"New York, I Love You XOXO" is the series finale of the American teen drama television series Gossip Girl. The episode serves as the tenth episode of the sixth season and the show's 121st episode overall. Written by Stephanie Savage, and directed by Mark Piznarski, the episode originally aired on The CW in the United States on December 17, 2012.

Gossip Girl follows the lives of a group of young adults coming from a wealthy background. In this final episode, the death of Bart Bass rushes Chuck Bass (Ed Westwick) to marry Blair Waldorf (Leighton Meester) and the identity of Gossip Girl is revealed. A five-year flash forward takes place and shows the wedding of Dan Humphrey (Penn Badgley) to Serena van der Woodsen (Blake Lively).

"New York, I Love You XOXO" received favorable reviews from television critics. Upon its initial airing, the finale was viewed in the United States by 1.55 million people and garnered a 0.8/2 Nielsen rating/share in the 18–49 demographic, registering as the season's most-watched episode.

== Plot ==
Continuing where the previous episode left off, Chuck Bass (Ed Westwick) and his father Bart's argument on the roof ends with the latter falling off the building. Chuck and Blair Waldorf (Leighton Meester) leave the scene and hide from the police as Chuck is considered "a person of interest" in the case. Jack Bass (Desmond Harrington), Chuck's uncle, comes to help him and suggests the two get married since spousal privilege prevents a wife from unwillingly testifying against her husband. Chuck thus proposes to Blair who tearfully accepts. Serena van der Woodsen (Blake Lively) discovers the alternate chapter about her that Dan Humphrey (Penn Badgley) wrote and put in her bag before she left for Los Angeles. She reads the chapter and decides to stay in New York to confront Dan. William van der Woodsen (William Baldwin) shows up to support Lily Bass (Kelly Rutherford) and tells Ivy Dickens (Kaylee DeFer) that he used her to get back to Lily.

With the death of Bart Bass, Nate Archibald (Chace Crawford) who is running the newspaper The Spectator, is no longer indebted to him (Bart paid his debts to control him) and he decides to find out for good who Gossip Girl is. Jack and Georgina Sparks (Michelle Trachtenberg) deal with the arrangements of Chuck and Blair's wedding. Before the ceremony, Serena and Blair have a conversation over why she is still talking to Dan after he published a negative chapter about her a few weeks ago. Overhearing their conversation, Dan leaves and gives to Nate his final chapter, which is about Gossip Girl. Blair and Chuck are married by Cyrus (Wallace Shawn) and right after, the police arrive to question them. At the same time, everyone's phones ring: Dan's chapter has been published in The Spectator, in which he reveals that he is Gossip Girl. Various characters react over the Gossip Girl reveal, including Vanessa (Jessica Szohr), Juliet (Katie Cassidy), Agnes (Willa Holland) and Lola (Ella Rae Peck), as well as Mayor Michael Bloomberg. Rachel Bilson, preparing to audition for a role in the adaptation of Dan's book, is told of Gossip Girl's identity by Kristen Bell, who shares a conspiratorial wink with the audience. Dan finally explains why he created Gossip Girl and says Jenny (Taylor Momsen) knew it all along.

5 Years Later: It is the day of Dan and Serena's wedding. Chuck and Blair are now parents of a son named Henry. Nate, now a successful businessman with The Spectator flourishing, is likely to run for Mayor of New York. Ivy has written an autobiography about her career as a con artist on the Upper East Side, which was adapted into a film starring both Lola and Olivia Burke (Hilary Duff). Blair and Jenny have become business partners in the fashion world and together they have created a clothing line called "J for Waldorf". Lily and William are back together while Rufus (Matthew Settle) is in a relationship with Lisa Loeb. Jack Bass and Georgina have also become a couple. The final scene shows the new generation of high school kids on the Upper East Side, mirroring the elite and the exclusion. The show ends as a new Gossip Girl is teased as "there will always be someone on the outside wanting to get in."

== Production ==
The episode was written by Stephanie Savage, while Mark Piznarski directed it. On October 31, 2012, TVLine revealed the title of the finale would be "New York, I Love You XOXO". Filming of the episode took place in October 2012 in New York. Some scenes were filmed at the Metropolitan Museum of Art while Blair and Chuck's wedding scene was filmed near the Bethesda Terrace. Featured music included Great Northern's cover of "Bonnie & Clyde", Rihanna's "Pon de Replay", Imagine Dragons's "It's Time", Release the Sunbird's cover of Talking Heads' "Road to Nowhere", The Mynabirds' "Body of Work", Florence and the Machine's "You've Got the Love", and The Pretty Reckless' "Kill Me" as closing song.

On October 5, 2012, executive producers Stephanie Savage and Sara Goodman told the reveal of who was behind Gossip Girl would happen in the sixth and final season. Savage said they didn't plan at first to reveal the identity of Gossip Girl but that they changed their minds because of the fifth season's storyline. On November 14, 2012, TVLine announced there would be a flashforward in the finale. Savage later told there would also be a flashback.

Costume designer Eric Daman dressed Blair (Meester) with a headband and Chuck (Westwick) with a scarf (in the flashback) as a tribute to previous seasons. Blair wore an Elie Saab dress for her wedding, while Serena (Lively) wore a Missoni dress. Serena's wedding dress was designed by Georges Chakra. Jenny (Momsen) and Blair both wore Zuhair Murad dresses to Serena and Dan's wedding while Georgina's dress was designed by Robert Rodriguez.

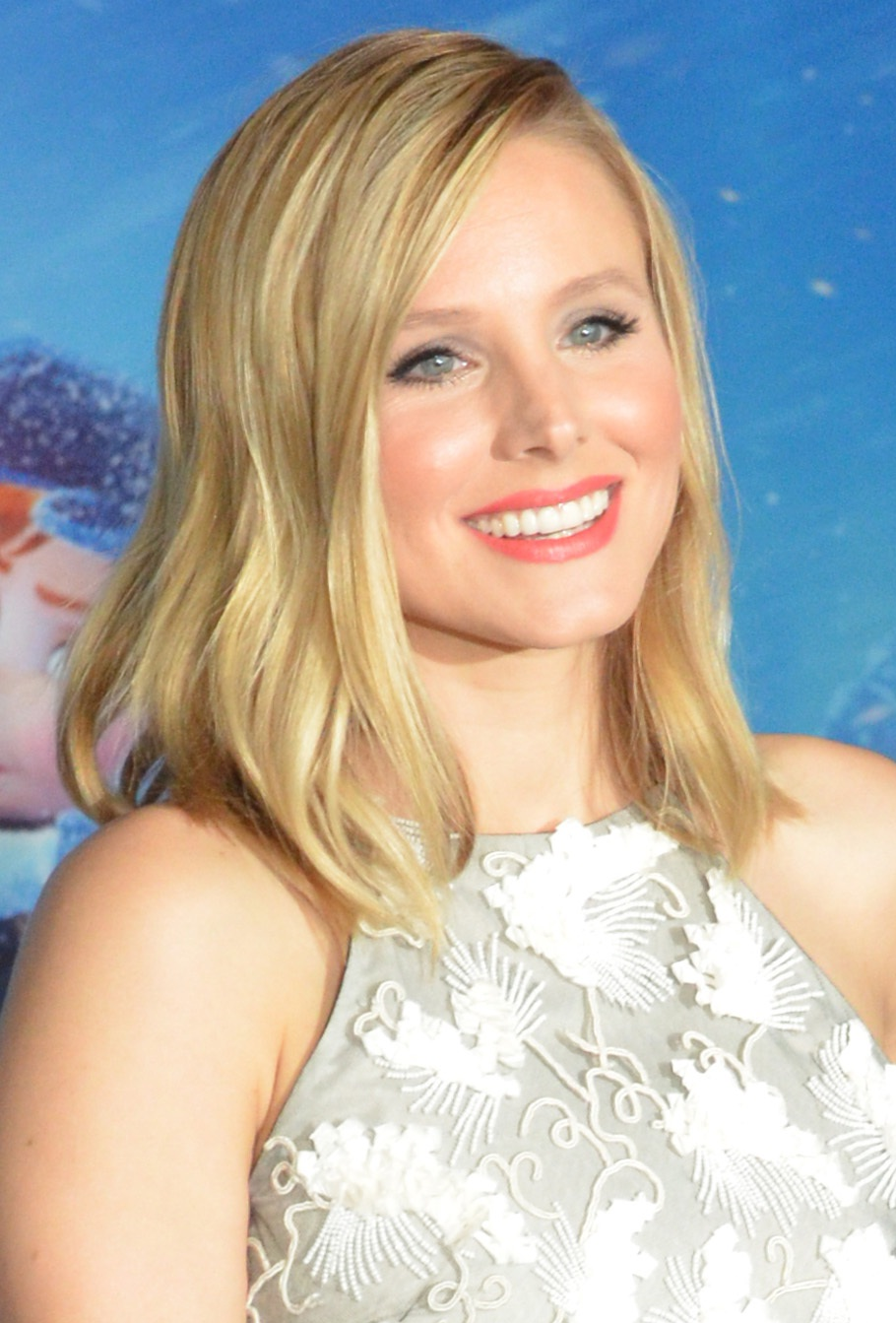
Kristen Bell, narrator of the series, appears onscreen in the finale for the first time.

=== Casting ===
Several former cast members returned for the series finale. Desmond Harrington reprised his role as Chuck's uncle, Jack Bass. News of Connor Paolo and Taylor Momsen's returns surfaced on October 16, 2012 when Kelly Rutherford posted on Instagram a picture of them on set. Katie Cassidy, Ella Rae Peck, Jessica Szohr, and Willa Holland also returned for small appearances. Long-time narrator Kristen Bell appeared in the episode as herself reading her lines alongside Rachel Bilson. On Bell's cameo Savage told: "It was really funny and very, very special to be shooting with her. She's an intimate part of our family but yet we never get to see her. To be able to make her a part of our storytelling just felt like the perfect way to crown her work with us over the years." She added: "If you’re going to have those two ladies together in a scene then we wanted to have fun and play to their strengths. So Josh Schwartz and I came up with the whole idea... To be able to have Kristen onscreen for the finale was great. And to have Rachel do it with her was just the icing on the cake." The episode also included cameo-appearances by New York City Mayor Michael Bloomberg and Lisa Loeb. Loeb, who had previously appeared in the show during the first season, ended up as Rufus' final partner. The writers made this choice so that he would not be alone but with someone from "his world", another musician.

== Reception ==
"New York, I Love You XOXO" was first broadcast on December 17, 2012 in the United States on The CW. The episode in the United States was watched by 1.55 million people and scored a 0.8/2 Nielsen rating/share in the adults among the 18–49 demographic, making it the most watched episode since April 25, 2011.

Sandra Gonzalez of Entertainment Weekly gave a positive review of the final installment, summarizing it as "a perfect balance of nostalgia, mythology, wit, trickery, and closure". Despite calling the choice of Dan being Gossip Girl "edgy, daring and probably dripping in inconsistency," she was satisfied that "it didn’t turn out to be an unknown person or peripheral character. The writers chose Gossip Girl straight from the heart of the gang — and that decision deserves some respect." She also appreciated the flashbacks describing them as "charming" as well as Chuck and Blair's wedding, which she called "gorgeous", and enjoyed the guest-star appearances. Writing for Newsday, Verne Gay thought the reveal of who was behind Gossip Girl was not surprising but was "a nice sort of perverse poetic justice." The Hollywood Reporter's Philiana Ng wrote the episode "reminded viewers of what Gossip Girl ultimately is and should be remembered as: a soapy, cheeky guilty pleasure." Rating it 4.8/5, Courtney Morrison of TV Fanatic described the finale as "epic". She liked Desmond Harrington's return and picked the five-year flash forward as a highlight of the episode. Even if she was surprised that Dan turned out to be Gossip Girl, she found that it "made sense".

However, Sonia Saraiya of The A.V. Club gave the episode a grade F, citing that it was "excruciatingly boring". Saraiya also criticised the revelation that Dan was Gossip Girl "so he not only, um, used Gossip Girl as a platform for spreading rumors, denigrating his friends, revealing his sister’s sex life in public and embarrassing ways, and, oh yes, nearly getting himself expelled (that is some ninja double-crossing skill)—he was using it to try to impress a girl that was literally the subject of his stalker-takedown-campaign for at least two years, if not for the run of the entire show."
