= Gossip Girl (novel series) =

American young adult novel series

- The first in the series of Gossip Girl novels
- Author: Cecily von Ziegesar (books 1–8, 12); Unknown ghostwriter (books 9–11, 13)
- Language: English
- Genre: Young adult novel
- Publisher: Little, Brown and Company
- Publication date: 2002–2011
- Publication place: United States

Gossip Girl is an American young adult novel series written by Cecily von Ziegesar and published by Little, Brown and Company, a subsidiary of the Hachette Group. The series revolves around the lives and romances of the privileged socialite teenagers at the Constance Billard School for Girls, an elite private school in New York City's Upper East Side. The books primarily focus on best friends Blair Waldorf and Serena van der Woodsen, whose experiences are among those chronicled by the eponymous gossip blogger. The novel series is based on the author's experiences at Nightingale-Bamford School and on what she heard from friends.

== Publication ==
The first novel, Gossip Girl, was released in April 2002; the eleventh novel of the series was released in May 2007, with a prequel novel following in October 2007. Another follow-up novel, in which the characters return home from college for the holidays, was released in hardback format in November 2009. The original novel became the inspiration for the Gossip Girl teen drama television series, created by Josh Schwartz and Stephanie Savage, which premiered on The CW on September 19, 2007. There are now 13 novels.

In May 2008, a follow-up series, Gossip Girl: The Carlyles, began publication, following the Carlyle triplets as they begin moving to the Upper East Side. As of October 2009, four novels have been released in this series. Ziegesar created a spin-off series, The It Girl, which began publication in 2005, and Yen Press has adapted the series into a manga series titled Gossip Girl: For Your Eyes Only.

== History ==
The novel that started the series, Gossip Girl, was published in paperback format in April 2002. Two new novels were released annually until the final novel, Don't You Forget About Me, was released in May 2007, showing the main characters graduating from high school and moving on to college and other pursuits. A prequel novel, It Had To Be You, was released in October 2007 in hardcover and electronic book format. It detailed the events that occurred a year before the first novel. A box set containing the eleven novels of the series and the prequel novel, in paperback format, was released November 1, 2009. Two days later, a sequel novel, I Will Always Love You was released. The hardcover book tells the story of the main characters returning home from college for the holidays. Hachette Group re-released all of the original novels in electronic book format between 2008 and 2009.

Books nine, ten and eleven of the main series were ghostwritten.

In December 2009, Yen Press announced that it was working with Korean artist Hyekyung Baek to create a manga adaptation of the series titled Gossip Girl: For Your Eyes Only. Rather than adapting the original novels, however, the graphic novels feature original stories with the same characters. It was serialized in the company's anthology magazine Yen Plus, from August 2010 to December 2013.

In October 2011, a parody of the series Gossip Girl: Psycho Killer written by von Ziegesar was released.

Unlike the show, Gossip Girl's identity in the books is not known. Von Ziegesar said of the character, "She was the omniscient narrator. Gossip Girl was me".

Cecily morphed the real-life high school named Nightingale-Bamford into Constance Billard, and also derived St. Jude from The Allen-Stevenson School.

== Characters from the first series of books ==
Blair Waldorf – In the novel series, Blair Cornelia Waldorf is a pretty, perfectionist, hard-working young woman with a compulsive personality and eating disorders. Ambitious and determined, she is willing to do anything to succeed and refuses to back down from any obstacle life places in her path. However, being very impulsive, she often acts out of anger or sorrow, leading her to commit numerous rash actions that she must then undo. Her tendency to overachieve can lead to feelings of paranoia, with dramatic or comical results.

Blair cares little about what others think of her, she lets everyone know what she has in mind and worries only about her future. She's also fiercely competitive. Domineering and authoritarian, she likes those around her to behave exactly as she expects and becomes irritable when they don't. She uses her charm, money and social clout to get what she wants and her father, in fact, raised her under the impression that she deserved everything she wishes. Although rather self-centered, she can at times show great empathy, especially toward those younger than herself. Resolutely romantic and idealistic by nature, she frequently imagines her life as a fairy tale. Though somewhat snobbish and haughty, Blair remains one of the most popular girls on the Upper East Side and has her own entourage around her.

A fashion enthusiast, she always wears the best shoes in the series and, being very athletic, is also tremendously talented at tennis, a discipline in which she is highly ranked at the national level. Blair is the eldest daughter of the extremely wealthy Harold J. Waldorf III, a renowned business attorney, and Eleanor Wheaton Waldorf, a Scottish Protestant socialite— and has a younger brother, Tyler Hugh Waldorf, six years her junior. Her pet is a small Russian Blue cat named Kitty Minky.

Blair's parents divorce when her father was caught cheating on her mother with his 21 year old secretary. His homosexuality being finally revealed, Harold decides to flee the scandal by settling permanently in the south of France with his young lover. After this painful separation, Eleanor meets Cyrus Rose, a Jewish real estate developer, and marries him shortly after. Blair thus acquires an anarchist, pacifist, vegan stepbrother, Aaron Rose, whom she initially cannot stand but who eventually earns her respect. This new union also brings the birth of Blair, Tyler and Aaron's half-sister, little Yale Rose, named by Blair in tribute to her dream university. At the beginning of the saga, Blair is a student at Constance Billard School for Girls, where she is the top student in her class, and her entire life revolves around her obsession with getting into Yale alongside her boyfriend, Nathaniel “Nate” Archibald - with whom she constantly breaks up and reconciles — and finally turning their relationship into a shared life, perhaps even a marriage. In the early part of the book series, she is also fixated on the idea of losing her virginity to him.

Blair idolizes actress Audrey Hepburn so intensely that she tries to live her life the way she imagines her idol would. She often turns various adventures into scenarios she plays out as though she were starring in the movie of her own life. Although beautiful and more than wealthy, Blair is constantly plagued by doubts and her life is far less perfect than she wishes.

Despite her excellent academic performance and numerous extracurricular activities (tennis, working in a soup kitchen one night a week, tutoring third graders in reading, taking fashion design course with Oscar de la Renta, chairing the Social Services Board, running the French Club, participating on the planning committee of every social function, doing charity work, presiding several youth organizations, etc.) she sees her college applications inexplicably rejected by most of the universities she applies to during her senior year, except for Georgetown, which immediately accepts her, and Yale, which at first places her — much to her dismay — on its waiting list.

Just as she is about to begin her higher education, her father — who has since remarried to a man named Giles — adopts two young Cambodian twins, Pierre and Pauline Waldorf (previously named Ping and Pong), thereby presenting Blair —desperate at the thought of no longer being the center of family attention — with two additional (half-)siblings.

After high school, Blair finally enters her dream university, Yale, where she studies political science for four years, hoping eventually to be admitted to law school. During her studies, her ambition even leads her to work on the campaign of a Connecticut senator. She also spent her junior year studying in England, at Saint Peter's College in the Oxford University where she crossed path again with Chuck and started a 12 months romance with him. Finally, in the fourth and final year of her undergraduate degree, she secures an internship at a prestigious New York litigation firm, MacMahon Cannon.

Blair has Serena Van der Woodsen as her childhood best friend and, though she loves her with all her heart, spends much of her time envying her. During her senior year, she also becomes the temporary roommate and friend of Vanessa Abrams and serves as a sort of mentor to Jenny Humphrey and Elise Wells.

Blair Cornelia Waldorf is described as average height (5'5"), slim and toned. She has long, dark chestnut, walnut-colored hair, cobalt-blue eyes, red lips, an aristocratic chin and a small fox-like face with delicate features. Her chest fills a B cup and she has a well-proportioned figure. She chopped her hair into a pixie cut in Because I'm Worth It, before having it extended in Don't You Forget About Me.

Serena van der Woodsen – angelic Serena Caroline van der Woodsen (Serena Celia VDW in the television adaptation) is the most beautiful, the richest, the coolest, the most popular and the wildest of the heroines. Her father, Mr. van der Woodsen (William in the television adaptation), runs the same Dutch shipping firm his great-great-grandfather founded in the 18th century, and her mother, Lillian van der Woodsen, is a philanthropic art collector. Billionaires, her parents are on the boards of all major charities and art organizations in NY city. She also has an older brother, Erik (one or three years her senior : this detail is inconsistent in the novels), who attends Brown University. The van der Woodsens reside at 994 Fifth Avenue, a ritzy, white-gloved doorman building directly across the street from The Met and Central Park. Her family owns half the top floor in a 14-room penthouse.

Serena attends Constance Billard, an elite private girls’ school, until the end of her sophomore year then is admitted to Hanover Academy, a very prestigious co-ed boarding school. She is eventually expelled a year later for taking the liberty of extending her summer vacation without the administration's approval. She returns to New York City, where her former school agrees to take her back for her senior year. She is not particularly academically skilled and she is often told that she is not meeting her full potential. This continually causes problems with her best friend, Blair Waldorf, as Serena is able to waltz her way easily through life while Blair has to work for things the blond beauty attains via her charm. A bit lazy, nonchalant and indecisive, she is nonetheless intelligent and perceptive and possesses numerous skills that help her obtain an excellent score on the SATs, which earns her admission to several of the most prestigious colleges in the country (like Yale, Harvard, Princeton, Brown, etc.) However, she never fully realizes the extent of her potential and sometimes loses her way in life, unable to set boundaries or commit to real effort in pursuit of ambitious goals.

Serena is kind and compassionate, a good-hearted person who wants only the best for others but she is also somewhat immature and fairly unstable. She gets bored easily and is always looking for a good time. Every hetero-/bi-/pansexual boy and every homo-/bi-/pansexual girl in New York — without exception — constantly tries to seduce her, even though she is incapable of maintaining a romantic relationship for more than a few days. The person she dated the longest during high school is Aaron Rose, Blair’s stepbrother. In the same period of time, she also briefly dated Dan Humphrey and Flow, the singer of the band 45.

Charismatic, enthusiastic, funny and approachable, she has no difficulty making friends wherever she goes or landing the best opportunities, whether she truly wants them or not, whether she deserves them or not. Despite her extraordinary beauty, Serena actually pays little attention to her appearance and even has a nail-biting habit and cuts her split ends off, mainly during her classes at school. Though exposed and aware of the on-goings in the fashion world, she is not as meticulous about her fashion choices and wardrobe as her friend.

Because of her free-spirited nature, she and Blair — her longtime best friend — often end up fighting. But despite their frequent clashes and the brunette sometimes openly hostile attitude towards her, Serena continues throughout the series to care deeply about her friend's well-being. She also has a complicated relationship with Nate, her other best friend, with whom she lost her virginity at age fifteen. The two never quite know whether they are in love with each other or simply friends.

For a time, the blonde beauty experimented with modeling — posing for renowned fashion or portrait photographers, walking the runway at New York Fashion Week for a famous designer (Les Best), becoming the face of a perfume brand that bears her name (Serena's Tears) and even appearing on the cover of an internationally acclaimed fashion magazine (W Magazine) — before ultimately landing the female lead in a remake of Breakfast at Tiffany's (Breakfast at Fred's) and its cinematic sequel (Coffee at the Palace), performances that were highly praised not only by the public but also by critics.

After finishing high school, she decides to take a gap year to focus on this new career and try to discover who she is, before eventually returning to university. She first attends the New School in New York for a year then transfers to the prestigious Yale University. Though Serena never managed to choose a specific academic path, it is known that her university courses mainly revolved around philosophy, theater and literature. At Yale, she changed a lot, taking her studies seriously for the first time and discovering new interests. She stopped trying to entertain herself at all costs and even maintained a second romantic relationship with the same guy, Dan, for two years. It appears at the end, however, that she's still in love with Nate.

During her senior year, she becomes friends with Vanessa Abrams and Georgina Spark and takes Jenny Humphrey under her wing.

Serena is described as tall (5'7") with long light-gold hair that curls slightly at her temples and large dark blue — almost navy — eyes. She is slender, willowy, with a slim waist, narrow hips, delicate shoulders, a flat stomach, well-shaped buttocks and long, thin legs. She has a 34B bust and a perfectly sculpted face, fair skin, rosy cheeks, full lips that tilt upward at the corners, an aristocratic chin and straight, white teeth. She is ethereally beautiful, often described as "perfect" in the books.

Nate Archibald - Nathaniel Fitzwilliam Archibald, known as Nate, is one of the most handsome boys on the Upper East Side and is also Blair's on-again, off-again boyfriend. He is passionate about sailing and boating, a talented lacrosse player and a regular marijuana user. He is the only son of Captain and Mrs Archibald, a very wealthy banker and a rich French aristocrat.

He constantly oscillates between his feelings for Blair and those he has for Serena, with whom he lost his virginity... until he is forced to attend rehab where he meets Georgina Spark, the girl who, despite herself, helps him change. Nate never knows what he wants and, the moment he is confronted with any difficulty, chooses escape.

He studies at Saint Jude’s School for Boys with his best friends, Anthony Avuldsen, Charlie Dern and Jeremy Tompkinson. His prowess on the lacrosse field earns him admission to most Ivy League universities — despite being an average student due to his marijuana addiction — without his ever particularly wanting it, as is the case with most things he receives. After his rehab, however, he begins to improve his academic skills and his life.

He is also the most common source of conflict between Blair and Serena and cannot stop himself from cheating on his girlfriends. However, despite his emotional inconsistency and his indecisive, lethargic nature, Nate is a young man with a sensitive and compassionate personality.

At the end of his high school years, although he had successfully completed all his exams and was set to graduate, Nate learns on the morning of the ceremony that he will not receive his diploma because he stole his lacrosse coach's Viagra. He then decides to travel the world by boat with Chips, his father's former mentor, also to avoid having to choose between his girlfriend and his best friend. Upon his return a few months later, eager to find his path, he enrolls — on the recommendation of his new best friend, Chuck Bass — at a university with unconventional teaching methods, Deep Springs College, where he studies for two years before being admitted to the prestigious Brown University to complete his education in the American Studies program. Nate is described as tall (standing at 5'11"), slim, broad-shouldered and muscular. He has an angular face, a square torso, wavy light chestnut hair streaked with golden blond, white teeth and bright dark green eyes.

Dan Humphrey - Daniel Randolph Jonah Humphrey, known as Dan, is a skinny, talented, sensitive, existentialist poet who drinks liters upon liters of instant coffee every day and smokes cigarettes at a frantic pace. He lives in a run-down Upper West Side apartment with his father, Rufus Humphrey — a bohemian, beatnik editor of minor Beat Generation poets — his younger sister, Jenny, who is three years his junior, and their cat, Marx. He has very little contact with his mother, Jeannette, an exuberant hippie artist, since she abruptly abandoned the family home to move to Prague with a wealthy aristocrat.

Dan is a pessimist who often sees the worst in things and is fascinated by death. He is also a romantic whose imagination spirals out of control at the worst possible moments. He has an unfortunate habit of overanalyzing events and his own emotions, which leads him to accumulate a great deal of frustration, as he struggles to manage the gap between reality — so often disappointing to him — and his fantasies. He watches over the people he loves and is particularly protective of his younger sister. His best friend is Zeke Freedman, whom he has known since first grade. At the beginning of the novel's series, he's infatuated with Serena and eventually briefly dates her.

During his senior year of high school, one of his poems (titled Whores) is published in The New Yorker, which leads to him being contacted by a well-known literary agent, Rusty Klein, who then recommends him for an internship with the editor of Red Letter, the most prestigious literary journal in the world.

The love of his life is Vanessa Abrams, though he has not always been the best boyfriend to her. He notably cheated on her with Mystery Craze, a poet with yellow teeth and an alarmingly thin frame and, later, with Bree, a yoga-lover. For a brief period — despite having no musical talent whatsoever — Dan was also the lyricist and singer of the trendy rock band The Raves, before being kicked out by his guitarist, Damian Polk, after a pitiful performance at a concert.

Dan attends Riverside Prep (Riverside Preparatory School for Boys) with Chuck, whom he despises. At the end of high school, he receives the E.B. White Writing Award from his headmaster, a prestigious prize recognizing the outstanding creative writing achievements of a Riverside Prep student. After graduation, Dan enrolls in the literature department at Evergreen State College but requests a transfer to Columbia University at the end of his first semester so he can return to New York City to be with his girlfriend, Vanessa. He then completes his undergraduate degree there in the literature program. During this time, another of his poems — titled Serena — is published in The New Yorker and allows him to reconnect with the real Serena. They even start dating again and their romantic relationship will last around two years this time. After finishing his higher education, Dan is admitted to the prestigious Iowa Writers' Workshop in the University of Iowa. In his senior year, he also had a brief homosexual affair with Greg, a colleague from the bookstore where he worked during the summer, before returning once again to Vanessa. By the end of the saga, after a long separation, Vanessa and Dan realize they still love each other and finally confess it.

Dan is described as tall (standing at five feet eleven inches), thin, pale-skinned, with a waxy-looking face, messy black hair, long sideburns and brown eyes.

Jenny Humphrey – Fourteen-year-old (twelve in the prequel) Jennifer Tallulah Humphrey is the youngest main character in the Gossip Girl saga. She lives in a run-down Upper West Side apartment with her father, Rufus Humphrey — a bohemian, beatnik editor of minor Beat Generation poets — her older brother Dan, three years her senior, and their cat, Marx. She has very little contact with her mother, Jeannette, an exuberant hippie artist who abruptly abandoned the family home to move to Prague to focus on her art and married a wealthy aristocrat.

Jenny is a talented painter who greatly admires Serena and wants to be like her. Blessed with a very generous chest and a mass of curly hair, she is often the target of mockery. She also works for her school's arts magazine, Rancor, founded by Vanessa.

Throughout the series, Jenny tries by all possible means to integrate herself into the glamorous world of the rich, popular, older girls at her private school, Constance Billard. Ambitious, she repeatedly manages to get invited to parties held by senior students despite her modest social status and even begins a modeling career with Serena's help (she appeared in the W Magazine). In the first book, Chuck sexually assaults her in the toilets during the Kiss On the Lips Party but she manages to call Dan who saves her. Later, having a lovely voice, she is also hired as the singer for the trendy rock band The Raves, replacing her brother.

At the beginning of the series, she briefly dated the highly sought-after Nate Archibald. At the end of her 9th grade, she requests a transfer to an exclusive boarding school where she decides to reinvent herself and become a true “It Girl,” just like Serena van der Woodsen. Jenny's best friend is Elise Wells.

At eighteen, after leaving the boarding school with her high school diploma in hand, she is admitted to the Rhode Island School of Design, where she studies drawing.

It Girl: At the end of 9th grade, Jenny is expelled from high school after a press photo showing her in a compromising position with the members of her band circulates. She therefore leaves Constance Billard School for girls to attend Waverly Academy, an elite boarding school in New York horse country where glamorous rich kids don't let the rules get in the way of an excellent time. Jenny is determined to leave her crazy Manhattan past behind and become a sophisticated goddess on campus. She meets her new roommates, Callie Vernon and Brett Messerschmidt, two of the most popular girls on campus. She quickly learns that she has replaced their old best friend, the extremely attractive and notorious Tinsley Carmichael. Jenny desperately wants to gain Tinsley's acceptance and finally be a part of the popular crowd but, along the way, she begins to wonder what price she will have to pay to achieve that goal. To make matters worse she falls hard for Callie's estranged boyfriend, Easy Walsh.

She soon becomes close friends with Brett and another classmate, Kara Whalen. Although she initially earns Callie's hostility because of the attraction her boyfriend feels for her and Tinsley's resentment for winning over her former friends and taking her place as the school’s It Girl, she eventually gains their friendship too.

Jenny is described as being very short (around 5'0") and slim; she has brown, curly hair, a straight and severe fringe across her forehead, large hazel eyes, a round face sprinkled with freckles, milky skin and a very ample chest (a 34E at 14).

Vanessa Abrams - Vanessa Marigold Abrams is a talented, aspiring filmmaker who wants more than anything to accomplish great things one day. She is the younger daughter of two eccentric, alternative hippie artists, Arlo and Gabriela Abrams. She lives in a Williamsburg, Brooklyn apartment with her older sister, Ruby — a bassist four years her senior — and Ruby's parrot, Tofu.

Vanessa attends Constance Billard School for Girls, where she is a true exception (or an anomaly, as she calls herself in the first book), since unlike her classmates, she cares little about her appearance or social events. Rebellious, nonconformist and provocative, she even shaves her head in tenth grade in order to set herself apart from the other students who she refuses to socialize with and who, to her great annoyance, constantly gush over her stunning black hair. She reads Tolstoy's War and Peace over and over like it's the Bible, listens to Belle and Sebastian and Gregorian chants and drinks unsweetened black tea.

During her teenage years, she adopts a punk aesthetic (shaved head, black turtlenecks, upper-lip piercing, and steel-toed Doc Martens), accompanied by a hostile attitude and a constant stream of sarcasm, behavior that stands in stark contrast to the glamorous, well-mannered heroines of the series. But this is, of course, only a façade meant to conceal her insecurities, hiding a sensitive and generous nature underneath.

Vanessa is also the founder of Constance Billard’s students-run arts magazine, Rancor. In book 7, she becomes Blair Waldorf’s new roommate and it appears that the young socialite's personality begins to rub off on the rebel: Vanessa starts wearing colors, paying more attention to her appearance, and opening up to the world with newfound warmth. She even begins a brief romance with Blair's stepbrother, Aaron Rose.

During her senior year, a renowned alternative filmmaker, Ken Mogul, notices her work and offers to screen one of her short films at the fashion show of a famous designer (Jedediah Angel) during New York Fashion Week. Later, he even hires her as an assistant director on one of his shoots. On graduation day, she receives the Georgia O'Keeffe Award for Creative Excellence, a prestigious prize recognizing the outstanding creative achievements of a student.

From the very beginning of the series, we learn that Vanessa is deeply and secretly in love with her best friend, Daniel Humphrey, whom she met two years earlier at a party where they both ended up locked outside. During their senior year, the two begin a romantic relationship, though it proves unstable, marked by numerous breakups and reconciliations.

Initially intimidated by Serena — whose place in Dan's heart she envies — Vanessa eventually gets to know her and becomes one of her friends. At the same time, she forms a close friendship with Jenny Humphrey, with whom she collaborates on the Rancor magazine.

After high school, Vanessa enrolls at New York University, where she studies film for four years and eventually lets her hair grow out again. Her boyfriend at the time gives her a small dog — Norma Desmond, half chow-chow, half poodle — whom she adopts as her pet. Meanwhile, her sister Ruby marries Piotr, a Czech painter, and they have a daughter named Moxie.

During her final year of university, Vanessa is offered a fellowship by Filmmakers for Change, allowing her to travel to Indonesia for a film project for 2 years. By the end of the series, Dan and Vanessa realize they still love each other and finally confess it.

Vanessa has fair skin, red lips and large hazel eyes; she is slim but has a bit of softness around her stomach, some fat on her hips and slightly chubby thighs. She has four large brown moles behind one ear, highly arched feet and alternates between a shaved head and long, sleek, jet-black hair. She gets her upper lip pierced on her eighteenth birthday.

Chuck Bass - Charles Bartholomew Bass is initially that an antagonist to the main characters. He is described as handsome, tall, slim, muscular, dark and brooding with firm abs, naturally tanned skin, straight black hair and deep brown eyes. He resides with his family at the Plaza Hotel on the Upper East Side. Unlike in the television adaptation, Chuck Bass plays only a minor role in the book series (the main characters each get their own alternating chapters but he does not). He is the eldest son of billionaires Bartholomew (“Bart”) and Misty Bass and the heir of the Bass leather and luxury goods fortune and has a brother, Donald. He is an egocentric, arrogant, obnoxious, narcissistic, misogynistic and spiteful character who attempts on several occasions throughout the saga to sexually assault his female classmates (like Kati Farkas, Serena, and Jenny). Very attractive, he pursues a modeling career for a time. Most of the characters in the series despise him but because he is extremely wealthy, everyone tolerates his presence. He is described as having flamboyant fashion sense, with a penchant for scarves. Lazy and vain, Chuck's only interests are sex and money, and he is frequently chided by his father for lacking ambition and performing poorly in school.

As the story progresses, he reveals more of his bisexuality and even attempts to seduce Dan. He has a lot of flings with numerous girls and boys throughout the novels. It is revealed he lost his virginity to Georgina Spark, his third cousin, back in sixth grade. During his high school years, he attends Riverside Prep, a private boys’ school, with his best friends, Roger Paine and Jefferson Prescott. A careless student with mediocre grades, Chuck is not admitted to any of the universities he applies to during his senior year. His father then threatens to send him to military school but ultimately finds a compromise: he enrolls his rebellious son at Deep Springs College, known for its unconventional learning methods.

Chuck emerges after two years completely transformed and significantly mellowed before finishing his studies at the University of Oxford in the United Kingdom. By then, he is no longer the man he once was; he has become the complete opposite of his former self: kind, gentle, sensitive, polite to everyone, understanding, empathetic, thoughtful and protective.

During this time, he reconnects with Nate, who becomes his best friend, and later begins a romantic relationship with Blair that lasts 12 months. Chuck's pet is a female snow monkey he received from Georgina Spark, Sweetie, whom he takes everywhere with him, dresses like himself, and considers his best friend.

== Characters from the second series of books ==
Avery Carlyle - Avery is one of the daughters of Edie Carlyle, a hippie artist; the granddaughter of the great Avery Carlyle I — a renowned New York philanthropist — and of Owen Carlyle I; as well as the sister of Baby and Owen. She does not know who her father is. She lived in Nantucket with her mother, brother, sister, their goat, three dogs, six cats and two tortoises until she was sixteen, before moving with them to Manhattan after the death of her maternal grandmother.

Very beautiful and very elegant, Avery was crowned Lobster Queen in her hometown and voted Best Dressed Girl at her former school, Nantucket High School. When she arrives in New York, she has only one dream: to become popular, make lots of friends and win the heart of a boy. Unfortunately for her, the private school she attends, Constance Billard, already has its Queen: Jack Laurent. Jack quickly sets out to turn Avery's social life into a nightmare but Avery is tenacious and determined and she stands up to her. She is eventually elected Liaison Officer to the School Supervisors’ Council in Jack's place and, after hosting an epic party, becomes the girl everyone in school wants to be seen with.

Ambitious, she lands an internship position at the Metropolitan Magazine. Sophisticated and deeply concerned with the image she projects, Avery takes great care of her appearance and sees Manhattan as her promised land. She secretly hopes that one day — like her beloved late maternal grandmother — she will become a New York icon, hosting the city's chicest events and wearing its most stunning outfits. However, the young woman, kind, gentle and sometimes naïve, is not exactly prepared for the devious ambushes her hypocritical high-society classmates can set for her. Sincere, she easily rejoices in the happiness of those she loves, without any jealousy. Dreamy, sensitive and romantic, she is nostalgic for old-school glamour and cares deeply about etiquette and good manners.

Avery is tall with long, thick hair the same golden-wheat blond as ripe grain, cobalt-blue eyes, an athletic figure, an ultra-flat stomach, a high forehead, small ears and a nose sprinkled with freckles.

Owen Carlyle - Owen is the son of Edie Carlyle, a hippie artist; the grandson of the great Avery Carlyle I — a renowned New York philanthropist — and of Owen Carlyle I; and the brother of Avery and Baby. He does not know who his father is. He lived in Nantucket with his mother, his two sisters, their goat, three dogs, six cats and two tortoises until he was sixteen, before moving with them to Manhattan after the death of his maternal grandmother.

Owen is so handsome that he stirs up passion wherever he goes. He is also athletic and a talented swimmer, which earns him a place on the swim team at Saint Jude’s, the private boys’ school he attends, where he achieves the best scores and eventually becomes temporary team captain. Owen was a womanizer until he met a girl named Kat, with whom he fell almost instantly in love during a summer in Nantucket. However, once he moves to Manhattan, he discovers that her real name is Kelsey and that she happens to be the girlfriend of Rhys Sterling, the captain of his swim team and, incidentally, his new friend. Although deeply attached to her, he decides to push her away out of respect for Rhys, heartbroken after their breakup, proving himself a loyal friend and an empathetic, selfless person. In many ways, Owen is the equivalent of Nate in the first generation: athletic and extremely handsome.

Owen is described as tall (standing at six feet three inches) and muscular with white-blond hair, blue eyes, a chiseled jawline, broad shoulders, a slim waist and a blond goatee.

Baby Carlyle - Baby is one of the daughters of Edie Carlyle, a hippie artist; the granddaughter of the great Avery Carlyle I — a renowned New York philanthropist — and of Owen Carlyle I; as well as the sister of Avery and Owen. She does not know who her father is. She lived in Nantucket with her mother, brother, sister, their goat, three dogs, six cats and two tortoises until she was sixteen, before moving with them to Manhattan after the death of her maternal grandmother.

Baby is the complete opposite of her sister Avery: rebellious and outspoken, she has no interest in becoming popular, says exactly what she thinks even if it shocks people and — though strikingly beautiful — pays no attention to her appearance or to what others might think of her. The hypocritical, snobbish, rich-kid atmosphere of the private girls’ school she attends, Constance Billard, quickly irritates her to the point where she repeatedly attempts to get herself expelled. From the moment she arrives in New York, she is homesick and devises a plan to return to Nantucket to reunite with her boyfriend, Tom Devlin, with whom she has been in a relationship for over a year. Unfortunately, upon returning to her hometown, she catches him with another girl (her best friend, Kendra) and immediately goes back to New York.

A passionate defender of nature and an anarchist, Baby swears only by organic living and fights against capitalism, which she refuses to give in to, despite her family's immense wealth. She is also an animal lover and knows exactly how to handle pets. She is interested in photography and quickly develops great talent in the field.

Upon arriving on the Upper East Side, Baby meets J.P. Cashman and his dogs and soon begins a romantic relationship with him. She also befriends Sidney Miller, with whom she collaborates on the school's arts magazine, Rancor, created by Vanessa Abrams. Over the course of the series, she ultimately breaks up with J.P. and impulsively leaves for Spain to find a young man she met through her new friend.

Baby is thin and petite, with long wavy chestnut hair accented by a long fringe, large hazel eyes, long chestnut lashes, prominent cheekbones, a high forehead, slender legs and small shoulders.

Jack Laurent - Jacqueline "Jack" Laurent is the daughter of Vivienne Restoin, a famous French prima ballerina, and Charles Laurent, a former U.S. ambassador who later became an investment consultant. Her conception was accidental and profoundly disrupted her parents’ lifestyle: her mother was forced to abandon her prestigious artistic career at the young age of twenty and to leave Paris for New York, where her relationship with Charles lasted only a few more years. After their separation, her father married several other women and had more children with them, including twin daughters with the latest one, Colette and Elodie Laurent.

Jack attends Constance Billard, the elite private girls’ school, where she quite literally reigns over the other students. She has been in a romantic relationship for a year with J.P. Cashman, the very handsome, well-mannered son of a real-estate tycoon and is considering sleeping with him for the first time. Jack inherited her mother's talent for classical ballet and, at the end of her sophomore year, was accepted into the summer program of the Paris Opera Ballet School, from which she was expelled for secretly drinking alcohol in her room. Her greatest dream is to make a living from her passion and become a great ballerina. To achieve this, she trains intensively in some of the best academies in the world.

Authoritarian, despotic and pretentious, Jack treats her friends and classmates as though she were their absolute ruler and is extremely demanding toward her boyfriend. Naturally snobbish and arrogant, she is awful to anyone she considers unworthy of her attention, whether socially or economically. Jealous, she cannot tolerate any girl approaching J.P. or threatening her status as Queen of the school and she devises the worst schemes to eliminate her rivals. Beautiful, elegant, superficial and condescending, she cares greatly about appearances and looks down on anyone who doesn't meet her standards. Her striking looks even land her a role as the face of a trendy real-estate campaign, earning her the front page of the New York Post and making her Manhattan’s new It Girl.

A perfectionist by nature, she has a habit of controlling every aspect of her life; in this, she is almost comparable to Blair Waldorf from the first series. When her father decides to cut off her funds — and her mother’s as well — to teach them responsibility, she finds ways to handle every problem that arises and hide the situation from her friends, regardless of the consequences for them. At the beginning of the series, she harbors a deep hatred for Avery, but she eventually becomes her friend. This reveals another side of Jack: sweet, friendly, sincere and loyal. In volume 15, she flirts with Owen Carlyle, with whom she later begins a romantic relationship.

Jack’s best friend is Genevieve Coursy. She is the first person to whom the young queen confides the truth about her situation when her billionaire father cuts her off financially. Jack has a Maltipoo, Magellan, as pet, which was given to her by J.P.’s mother.

Jack is described as tall, slim, and toned, with long, poker-straight auburn hair, large green cat-like eyes, pale skin, a face covered in freckles, a long ballerina’s neck and delicate shoulders.

Rhys Sterling - Rhys is the only child of Lady Sterling, the famous host of a very popular television show about etiquette and proper manners, Tea with Lady Sterling, and of a wealthy English aristocrat, Lord Algernon Sterling, CEO of a major literary publishing empire. He is the captain of the swim team at Saint Jude’s, the private boys’ school he attends.

He has been dating Kelsey, a childhood friend, for two years when she suddenly ends their relationship to begin a romance with Owen. Despite their abrupt breakup, he remains deeply in love with her and tries everything he can to win her back.

Rhys is a sensitive, friendly and romantic boy, as well as a loyal friend. He is very attached to good manners and proper upbringing. He has five dogs, all Corgis. His mother is very “proper,” extremely chic, and very strict when it comes to his education. He begins a sincere and profound romantic relationship with Avery in volume 15.

Rhys is tall (standing at nearly six feet three inches) and muscular, with dark chestnut hair and hazel eyes flecked with gold, a well-defined face, an angular chin, broad swimmer's shoulders and slim hips.

Kat - Kelsey Addison Talmadge, or "Kat", comes from a modest background: she was born in Williamsburg, Brooklyn, and moved to the Upper East Side when her mother, a sculptor, married a wealthy financier. She attends Seaton Arms, an elite private girls’ school.

Kelsey is a brilliant painter whose work has already been exhibited several times in professional Manhattan galleries, despite her young age. She is relentlessly positive and delights in everything around her, from the simplest things to the most extravagant, which makes her a pleasant and engaging conversationalist. Beautiful and elegant, she is also kind and entirely free of pretension — unlike many of her Upper East Side peers. In addition to being a gifted artist, Kelsey is also a talented athlete who truly shines on the tennis courts.

She has been dating Rhys Sterling — whom she has known since childhood — for nearly two years when she meets Owen Carlyle during a trip to Nantucket and immediately falls in love with him. Upon returning to New York, she decides to end her relationship with Rhys, leaving him devastated. She has one particular trait that Owen adores: her hair always smells like apples.

Kelsey has long, wavy hair the color of hard-butter caramel, lively silver-blue eyes, a slightly upturned nose, a heart-shaped mouth, a slightly crooked left incisor, slim hips, athletic ankles, delicate yet toned shoulders, creamy fair skin, small ears and breasts that fill a B-cup.

J.P. Cashman - J.P. is the only child of Dick Cashman, a real estate magnate involved in environmental causes, and Tatyana, a former Russian model. He attends Riverside Prep, an elite private boys’ school. He is charming, modest, funny, generous and very kind. At the beginning of the series, he has been dating Jack Laurent for a year. However, he happens to meet Baby Carlyle, quickly becomes close to her and falls in love with her. He therefore decides to end his relationship with Jack. He has three dogs: a sand-colored Labrador named Nemo and two coffee-colored Puggles named Darwin and Shackleton.

J.P. is muscular and broad-shouldered, with intelligent hazel eyes, neatly cut chestnut hair parted cleanly to the side, a square face, a rugged jawline and large hands.

== List of novels ==
=== Gossip Girl ===
Title	Publication date	Length (first edition)	ISBN
Gossip Girl	April 1, 2002	224 pp	978-0-316-91033-0
Teenager Blair Waldorf sneaks away from a party to have sex with her boyfriend Nate Archibald, however they are interrupted by the return of Blair's old friend Serena van der Woodsen, who was away at boarding school. When Serena was around, Blair felt as if she were lost in her blond friend's shadow, so she is not thrilled that she has returned. She is also unhappy to find out that Nate and her had sex the summer before she left. She tries to keep Serena out of the loop and encourages others to ignore her. Not understanding why she is getting the cold shoulder, Serena decides to try new activities and tries out for the school play, but is rejected. Later she tries out for Vanessa Abrams' short film, War and Peace, in Central Park. However, Vanessa grows jealous when her best friend and secret crush, Dan Humphrey, who is in love with Serena, seems infatuated with her. Vanessa chooses another girl for the part. Undeterred, Serena decides to make her own film and enlists the help of Jenny Humphrey, Dan's younger sister. Throughout the story, the various characters regularly visit "Gossip Girl," a popular, anonymous blog that spreads rumors and gossip about them. During a benefit organized by Blair, which Jenny has been trying to get into, Chuck Bass attacks her, but Dan Humphrey and Serena rescue her.
You Know You Love Me	September 1, 2002	256 pp	978-0-316-91148-1
Eleanor Waldorf's upcoming wedding with Cyrus Rose threatens to overshadow Blair's birthday. College interviews bring out the best and worst in the seniors, as Blair hangs out with her new stepbrother-to-be Aaron Rose, and Dan finds out how just not into him Serena is. Nate starts hanging out with Jenny, and Jenny falls madly in love with him. Serena and Blair reunite as best friends again. Nate eventually two-times Blair with Jenny at Eleanor's wedding, bringing Serena and Blair closer.
All I Want Is Everything	May 7, 2003	240 pp	978-0-316-91212-9
Christmas time in New York City has arrived and Serena moves from dating superstar Flow to vegan Aaron when they all end up on a Caribbean vacation with the Waldorfs. Jenny gets stalkerish with Nate, while Nate realizes who he truly loves. Blair learns that her mother is pregnant and decides that Nate isn't worthy of being her leading man. Jenny paints a number of portraits of Nate.
Because I'm Worth It	October 1, 2003	256 pp	978-0-316-90968-6
Vanessa and Dan's romance comes to a halt when he turns into an overnight literary superstar with her help. Serena makes her modeling debut during Fashion Week, inadvertently pushing away her boyfriend Aaron. Nate is sent to rehab where he meets Georgina Spark. Dan two-times Vanessa with Mystery Craze while Vanessa watches crying silently.
I Like It Like That	May 5, 2004	224 pp	978-0-316-73518-6
Spring break arrives. Serena, Blair, Nate and Georgina are off to ski in Sun Valley where Blair nearly sleeps with Serena's brother, Erik. Jenny finds out her boyfriend is keeping a secret from her. Dan interns at a pretentious literary magazine, while Nate realizes just how crazy Georgina Spark can be. Serena and Georgina become friends before Chuck and Georgina send Serena snow boarding in close to nothing. The board capsizes and Serena falls in a ditch.
You're the One That I Want	October 6, 2004	256 pp	978-0-316-73516-2
College acceptance letters are arriving and Serena and Nate get in everywhere they applied while Blair is only accepted in Georgetown and waitlisted for her dream school, Yale. Jenny becomes a model with S's help and realizes she wants to be more like Serena. Dan and Vanessa decide to live together briefly. Dan becomes irritated with Vanessa's new friend Tiphany and her ferret.
Nobody Does It Better	May 11, 2005	256 pp	978-0-316-73512-4
After briefly living at the Plaza, Blair unexpectedly decides to move in with Vanessa. Racy pictures of Jenny surface, landing her in trouble at Constance, which she loves. Jenny wants to go to boarding school.
Nothing Can Keep Us Together	October 5, 2005	240 pp	978-0-316-73509-4
As graduation approaches, Blair moves out of V's apartment and into the Yale club where she meets Lord Marcus. A filmmaker is casting talent for a remake of Breakfast at Tiffany's. Jenny scouts boarding schools, setting up her exit from the series for her spin-off series, The It Girl. B and S audition for the lead in Breakfast at Fred's but Serena lands the role, tearing her and Blair's friendship apart again.
Only in Your Dreams written by ghost-writer	May 10, 2006	256 pp	978-0-316-01182-2
Nate dates a Hamptons townie named Tawny and Dan two-times Vanessa with yoga-loving Bree. Blair returns from London and lives with Serena. Not surprisingly when Nate and Tawny meet Blair and Serena, the two girls reaction is not impressed.
Would I Lie to You? written by ghost-writer	October 4, 2006	224 pp	978-0-316-01183-9
Blair and Nate reunite just as Serena realizes she's in love with him. Dan starts an experimental literary salon and thinks he's gay after making out with his male co-worker.
Don't You Forget About Me written by ghost-writer	May 1, 2007	304 pp	978-0-316-01184-6
As summer winds down, Blair learns that her family is relocating to California. Dan finally figures out whom his heart really belongs to. Nate is forced to choose between Blair and Serena. Dan's mother returns and gives him presents for being gay.
It Had to Be You	October 2, 2007	417 pp	978-0-316-01768-8
This prequel to the Gossip Girl series reveals how Serena left Constance Billard School for Girls after falling in love with Nate. The story also explores Blair's obsession with Audrey Hepburn, and how Nate came between best friends Serena and Blair.
I Will Always Love You written by ghost-writer	November 3, 2009	400 pp	978-0-316-04361-8
The original cast returns to New York. Blair is studying at Yale and has a new boyfriend, Serena is an A-list movie star, Dan has left Evergreen and transferred to Columbia so he can be close to Vanessa, Vanessa is studying film at NYU, and Nate has returned from his trip at sea. Blair and Nate have a whirlwind romance for several days, and Nate realizes Blair is the one he’s meant to be with — that is, until he lays eyes on Serena, who is more confused than ever. Vanessa is overwhelmed by all of Dan’s plans about living together and starting a life, which leads her to cheat on him with Hollis, her TA. Chuck returns straight-laced, penniless, and full of wisdom. Impressed by his story and his transformation, Nate enrolls at Deep Springs College. One year later, after the success of her second movie, Serena decides to enroll at Yale University. Blair works on a senator's campaign during an internship. Dan is crushed with sorrow until Serena reads one of his poems and they start dating again. Two more years pass, and Serena is more serious than she has ever been, and she and Blair are only a few steps away from getting their Yale degrees. Nate has graduated from Deep Springs College and is now studying at Brown. He’s dating Jenny again, who has just enrolled at RISD. Chuck and Blair are together, and Chuck is about to graduate from Oxford. Vanessa has left Hollis. Dan, who is finishing his studies at Columbia, has just been accepted into a poetry program in Iowa, while Vanessa is completing her film studies at NYU and has earned a scholarship to go to Indonesia for a film project. They realize they are still in love with each other. The old love triangle, meanwhile, forms once again, and Nate finds himself facing his old dilemma: Serena or Blair.
Psycho Killer	October 3, 2011	320 pp	978-0-316-18509-7
A slasher parody reworking of the first book of the series, turning Blair and Serena into serial killers.

=== Gossip Girl: The Carlyles ===
Title	Publication date	Length (first edition)	ISBN
Gossip Girl: The Carlyles written by Baby Annabelle	May 6, 2008	256 pp	978-0-316-02064-0
Get out your Montblanc pens, Chloe satchels, and cashmere cardigans: it's a brand-new season on the Upper East Side, and the irresistible Carlyle triplets are taking Manhattan by storm. You know it's going to be another wild and wicked year, and I'll be here to whisper all the juicy secrets.
You Just Can't Get Enough written by Annabelle Vestry	October 7, 2008	240 pp	978-0-316-02065-7
It's September—time to put away your white eyelet sundresses and platform espadrilles and say goodbye to the East End. But say hello to Manhattan's newest residents, the scene-stealing, heart-stealing Carlyle triplets. Lock up your boyfriends and throw away the key, because B and A are hotter than NYC during a sultry Indian summer.
Take a Chance on Me written by Annabelle Vestry	May 12, 2009	256 pp	978-0-316-02066-4
Baby Carlyle breaks up with J.P., Avery and Jack become good friends, and Owen dates Kelsey for a while and then dumps her, as he realizes that they don't really know each other and their only attraction is lust. Rhys is heartbroken over Kelsey, but gets over her and forgives Owen.
Love the One You're With written by Annabelle Vestry	October 1, 2009	240 pp	978-0-316-02067-1
The Carlyles go on vacation to The Bahamas with Remington, their mom's fiancé, his daughter, Layla, and her boyfriend, Riley. They are joined by Rhys, Owen's friend, and Jack. Baby feels alone, until she realizes that she and Riley have a real connection. But she and Layla make a great team too... Rhys is being pressured by Hugh and the swim team to hook up with a girl, so Owen decides to set him up with an aggressive British girl. But the only girl Rhys has eyes for is Avery... Owen's sister. Jack realizes that her feelings for Owen run much deeper than she thought, but she can't bring herself to tell Avery. Amidst all of the secret drama, Remington and Edie Carlyle decide to get married.

== Reception ==
The Gossip Girl series has received a mixed reception.

The American Library Association selected the Gossip Girl series as Quick Picks for Reluctant Young Adult Readers in 2003. In 2008, it was also named Booklist Editors' Choice: Adult Books for Young Adults.

Despite the above, the Gossip Girl series has frequently been the center of controversy due to homosexuality, offensive language, drugs, being sexually explicit, and being unsuited to age group. The series appears on the American Library Association's list of the one hundred most banned and challenged books from 2000 to 2009, and 2010 to 2019 (56). The series also appeared in the top ten list in 2006 (2), 2008 (7) and 2011 (9).

The criticism of the Gossip Girl series primarily revolves around whether the events depicted in the story are appropriate for the teenage audience the books attract. American author and feminist Naomi Wolf in 2006 called the books "corruption with a cute overlay." Wolf also claims that "sex saturates the Gossip Girl books.... This is not the frank sexual exploration found in a Judy Blume novel, but teenage sexuality via Juicy Couture, blasé and entirely commodified."

Pam Spencer Holley, former YALSA President with the American Library Association (ALA), presents a different point of view, claiming simply to be "happy to see teen girls reading." Confident that young girls will move onto more respected literature, Holley points out, "Unless you read stuff that's perhaps not the most literary, you'll never understand what good works are." She went on to say, "Nobody complains about the adult women who read Harlequin romances." Holley created a new ALA book list to encourage teens to consult a list of recommendations for "both avid and reluctant readers, who are looking for books like Cecily von Ziegesar's Gossip Girl series. 'The books on this list are perfect for when your readers have finished with every Gossip Girl title in your library and are clamoring for another book like the Gossip Girl.'"

Scholars have criticized the series as a low quality series fiction aimed at teenage girls, focused on activities such as "frenzied shopping, gossiping, partying, and sexual encounters", and portraying beauty and wealth as most important and desirable qualities.

== Television adaptation ==
The television adaptation of the novel series, also titled Gossip Girl, was picked up by The CW. Josh Schwartz, the creator of The O.C., is executive producer for the project. In the show, Blake Lively plays Serena, Leighton Meester plays Blair, Chace Crawford plays Nate, Penn Badgley plays Dan, Ed Westwick plays Chuck, Taylor Momsen plays Jenny and Jessica Szohr plays Vanessa. The show is loosely based on the books and does not follow the same story line. Some key characters from the books, such as Aaron Rose or the Lord, are introduced into the show with different storylines, and some characters undergo changes to their personality and characteristics. For example, Serena's older brother in the books, Erik van der Woodsen, is two years younger than her instead of older, and the characters of Serena, Blair, Chuck and Nate have been best friends since childhood compared to the novel series where the story's main friendship was only between Serena, Blair and Nate; with Chuck not being one of the main characters.

In 2021 the show got a soft reboot with the series by the same name.
