= Dan Humphrey =

Fictional character

- Gossip Girl character
- Penn Badgley as Dan Humphrey
- First appearance: Novel: Gossip Girl; Television: "Pilot" (episode 1.01)
- Last appearance: Novel: I Will Always Love You; Television: "New York, I Love You XOXO" (episode 6.10)
- Created by: Character; Cecily von Ziegesar; Developed for Television; Josh Schwartz; Stephanie Savage
- Portrayed by: Penn Badgley
- Voiced by: Kristen Bell (as "Gossip Girl", narrator of the original 2007 TV series)

In-universe information
- Full name: Novels: Daniel Randolph Jonah Humphrey; Television: Daniel Randolph Humphrey
- Aliases: Novels: Dan; D Television: Lonely Boy; Gossip Girl
- Nicknames: Television: Dan(byEverybody); Cabbage Patch (by Blair); Humphrey (by Blair); Lonely Boy (by Gossip Girl); Brooklyn (by Chuck); Mrs Humphrey(byDorota)
- Occupation: Novels: University of Iowa Student in the Iowa Writers' Workshop (currently); Poet published in The New Yorker; College Student at Columbia University (graduated); College Student at the Evergreen State College (formerly); Bookseller (formerly); High school student (at Riverside Preparatory; graduated); Television: Author; Freelance writer High school student (at St. Jude's; graduated); College student (at NYU); Former W Magazine intern Gossip Girl (former)
- Family: Rufus Humphrey (father); Jennifer "Jenny" Humphrey (younger sister); Novels: Jeanette Humphrey (mother; estranged); Sophia (aunt); Marx (pet); Television: Alison Humphrey (mother; estranged); Lillian "Lily" van der Woodsen (former step-mother/mother-in-law); Scott Rosson (paternal half-brother)
- Spouses: Television: Serena van der Woodsen (wife; flash-forward)
- Children: Television: Unnamed kid (with Serena)

Daniel Randolph Humphrey is a fictional character from the Gossip Girl franchise.

He is one of the core male characters in Gossip Girl, played by American actor Penn Badgley. The character comes from an artistic and musically-inclined family. His father in the show, Rufus Humphrey, is an aspiring rock musician; his mother in the show, Alison Humphrey, is an artist who walked out on her family when Dan was young, leaving him with a deep sense of abandonment and distrust. He has a younger sister in the show, Jennifer Humphrey.

Dan and his family live in Brooklyn, the alternative to the old-money and conservative Upper East Side. The character pursued his education at St. Jude's Preparatory School on the West side as a scholarship student.

Dan Humphrey is considered charismatic and attractive, due to his good looks, charm, and wit. Portrayed as an incredibly talented individual with an interest in poetry, he shares a close bond with his sister, Jenny, evident in his dedication to her schooling and protectiveness of her.

== Novel series ==
Daniel Randolph Jonah Humphrey, known as Dan, is a skinny, talented, sensitive, existentialist poet who drinks liters upon liters of instant coffee every day and smokes cigarettes at a frantic pace. He lives in a run-down Upper West Side apartment with his father, Rufus Humphrey — a bohemian, beatnik editor of minor Beat Generation poets — his younger sister, Jenny, who is three years his junior, and their cat, Marx. He has very few contact with his mother, Jeannette, an exuberant hippie artist, since she abruptly abandoned the family home to move to Prague with a wealthy aristocrat.

Dan is a pessimist who often sees the worst in things and is fascinated by death. He is also a romantic whose imagination spirals out of control at the worst possible moments. He has an unfortunate habit of overanalyzing events and his own emotions, which leads him to accumulate a great deal of frustration, as he struggles to manage the gap between reality — so often disappointing to him — and his fantasies. He watches over the people he loves and is particularly protective of his younger sister. His best friend is Zeke Freedman, whom he has known since first grade. At the beginning of the novels series, he's infatuated with Serena and eventually brieftly dates her.

During his senior year of high school, one of his poems (titled Whores) is published in The New Yorker, which leads to him being contacted by a well-known literary agent, Rusty Klein, who then recommends him for an internship with the editor of Red Letter, the most prestigious literary journal in the world.

His primary interest is Vanessa Abrams, though he has not always been a faithful partner to her. He notably cheated on her with Mystery Craze, a poet described as having yellow teeth and an alarmingly thin frame and, later, with Bree, a yoga-lover. For a brief period — despite lacking musical talent — Dan was also the lyricist and singer for the trendy rock band The Raves, before being removed by his guitarist, Damian Polk, after a poor performance at a concert.

Dan attends Riverside Prep (Riverside Preparatory School for Boys) with Chuck, whom he despises. At the end of high school, he receives the E.B. White Writing Award from his headmaster, a prestigious prize recognizing the outstanding creative writing achievements of a Riverside Prep student. After graduation, Dan enrolls in the literature department at Evergreen State College but requests a transfer to Columbia University at the end of his first semester so he can return to New York City to be with his girlfriend, Vanessa. He then completes his undergraduate degree there in the literature program. During this time, another of his poems — titled Serena — is published in The New Yorker and allows him to reconnect with the real Serena. They even start dating again and their romantic relationship will last around two years this time. After finishing his higher education, Dan is admitted to the prestigious Iowa Writers' Workshop in the University of Iowa. In his senior year, he also had a brief homosexual affair with Greg, a colleague from the bookstore where he worked during the summer, before returning once again to Vanessa. By the end of the saga, after a long separation, Vanessa and Dan realize they still love each other and finally confess it.

Dan is described as tall (standing at five feet eleven inches), thin, pale-skinned, with a waxy-looking face, messy black hair, long sideburns and brown eyes.

== Television series ==
The character Dan "Lonely Boy" Humphrey is the son of rocker Rufus Humphrey, and the older brother of Jenny Humphrey. Dan and his family reside in Brooklyn. He is a writer and attends the St. Jude's School for boys. He has longed for Serena van der Woodsen since a party when they were fifteen and she was the only person who was nice to him.

=== Season 1 ===
His mother lives away from home, in Hudson, as an artist. Compared to his wealthy classmates at St. Jude's, Dan is financially inferior.

Dan is one of the first people to see Serena back in person. He accidentally bumps into her, causing her to fall and spill the contents of her purse and leave behind her cellphone. In an attempt to see her again, he returns the phone to The New York Palace Hotel where she lives. He runs into Serena and ends up on a date with her so she does not have to go to the "Kiss On The Lips" party which Blair is throwing. They have a rocky first date and it ends early because he gets a text from his sister in the show saying that she needs help at the party. Serena helps Jenny and saves her from Chuck Bass. Dan is highly embarrassed after this, as at the end of the date he only waves to her from a taxi. He and Serena end up going out again but he leaves her after Blair tells him about Serena and Nate hooking up at a party when Nate and Blair were a couple. They make up and become a constant source of attention.

Behind the scenes is Dan's childhood best friend Vanessa, who is clearly jealous of Serena and very much in love with Dan, but he is oblivious to this. Despite Dan's clear preference for Serena, Serena cannot help but feel jealous of how close Dan is with Vanessa.

When he learns from the Gossip Girl site that Serena was seen buying pregnancy tests, he freaks out knowing that the child could very well be his as they've slept together. His father sees this as well and is extremely upset that his son may be a teenage father. Dan explains he will stay with Serena no matter what she does because he loves her. He tells this to Serena who says she's not having a child. Later on, he tells her that he loves her, and she responds with, "Okay." She later asks him why he loves her and he reads her the list he made of the reasons. She believes him and says she loves him as well, but she needs to help Blair.

When Georgina Sparks arrives on the Upper East Side with the intent on making Serena's life hell, she gets to know Dan behind Serena's back. Pretending to be "Sarah" and accidentally-on-purpose letting her dog run off its leash in the park, Georgina gets an excuse to talk to Dan. It is later seen that Dan and Vanessa have taken "Sarah" under their wing as they believe she is a new girl to the Upper East Side who doesn't know her way around.

Eventually, Dan breaks up with Serena because he believes she has slept with someone else and is tired of her holding secrets from him. A few hours after the breakup, he kisses Georgina, thinking she is a helpless girl running away from a psychotic ex-boyfriend. Soon thereafter, Dan is convinced that Georgina is lying to him after being told the truth by Serena. He and Blair manage to fool Georgina into thinking that Dan wants to meet up with her. The real purpose of the plan, though, is to get Georgina to meet with her parents and then get sent to a Christian boot camp. Dan and Serena rekindle what is left of their relationship before Dan ultimately ends it entirely.

=== Season 2 ===
In the summer, Dan goes from being a lonely boy to a playboy, dating continuously with thoughts of Serena still on his mind. He eventually gets fired from his summer job due to a lack of commitment and heads to the Hamptons hoping to see Serena. However, he finds her kissing Nate and shows anger. He and Serena retreat to talk and spend the night together but decide to keep their relationship a secret. The two rekindle their relationship and talk during a citywide blackout but eventually break up. Dan meets a transfer student named Amanda and starts dating her, leading to tension with Serena. Dan uses Chuck to fuel a new story but later realizes it's wrong to exploit people for art. During a visit to Yale, Dan has trouble getting a recommendation but eventually gets help from a co-ed. Chuck fools a secret society into thinking Dan is Nate, leading to Dan being stripped of his clothes and tied to a statue.

=== Season 3 ===
Dan joins NYU and quickly fits in among the aspiring writers. He becomes popular, has a short-lived relationship with Georgina, and then moves on to a relationship with Olivia, a Hollywood film star. However, their relationship comes to an end when Olivia returns to Hollywood. Dan confesses his love for Vanessa, who initially turns him down but eventually reveals her feelings for him, and they get together. Dan and Vanessa's relationship is put to the test when Vanessa takes a six-month trip to Haiti for an internship with CNN.

=== Season 4 ===
The reaction to the Dan, Blair, and Serena triangle on "Gossip Girl" polarized viewers and garnered significant media interest. Some fans appreciated the relationship development between Dan and Blair, finding more chemistry than Blair and Chuck, while others preferred the original Chuck and Blair pairing. Producer Joshua Safran acknowledged that Chuck and Blair would always be connected in their own way and that Dan and Serena would always be connected in their own way. However, he also noted the potential for new roads to be explored that might differ from the initial expectations.

=== Season 5 ===
The fifth season opens with Dan in the Hamptons. He appears upset when he receives Blair's invitation for her royal wedding. Dan soon finds out that someone has published his book, Inside. Meanwhile, Blair, back from her cruise and is currently in Manhattan again, is frustrated with Louis' domineering mother, who feels the need to have complete control over the wedding. Dan finds out that Vanessa has published his book without his permission and tries to undo the damage, especially after Vanity Fair want to publish a part about Dan and Blair. Desperate, Dan turns to Louis for some help, hoping the prince could put some royal weight on it and manage to cancel the publishing. Louis informs him that he promised earlier to Blair that he's going to take her to the Royal consulate, so he calls her and tells her that he would not be able to make it, much to Blair's disappointment.

Soon after, Blair then arrives at Dan's loft and tells him that despite they haven't spoken since the holidays, she needs a friend to talk to and believes that he is the only one that will truly listen. She announces that she plans to break it off with Louis and asks him about his trip to the Hamptons, to which he responds to staying at CeCe's house.

She asks him to take her there, and Dan tells her he will be there for her for whatever she needs. He decides to conceal the real reason why Louis couldn't make it. Just as they were about to make a move, Louis enters the loft. Blair assumes that he was following her and starts reprimanding him until Dan's conscience gets the better of him and reveals that Louis was only helping him with his book issue. Blair soon becomes furious with Dan as he did not tell her the real reason why Louis could not make it and departs with Louis, arm-in-arm, leaving Dan alone and heartbroken. At the end of the episode, it's revealed that Blair is the one pregnant.

Over the next few episodes, Blair is found having trouble keeping the pregnancy a secret and begins having morning sickness. Things get more difficult when Louis's sister, Princess Beatrice, comes to town. When she hears Blair's morning sickness in the bathroom, she begins to assume that Blair has gone back to being bulimic. She decides to invite Blair to a feast to be sure.

Meanwhile, in Brooklyn, Dan is still trying to stop the publishing of his book to save the relationship he has built with his closest friends and family. He calls Serena on the phone and asks her how she went through Lily's bank account so that he can go to Vanessa's bank and look for the publisher. However, she tells him that it was all Chuck's doing, driving him to go searching for Chuck. To his horror, he finds Chuck getting beat up by men. He attempts to save Chuck, when he reveals that the men were not real criminals, and he paid them to hurt him, much to Dan's astonishment. This leads Dan to search for Blair and inform her about Chuck's recent dilemma.

Meanwhile, at the feast, Blair begins to feel sick and searches for an excuse to run to the bathroom without arising suspicion. She begins to silently pray to God for a way out, and once she finishes, she sees Dan at the front of the door. Blair rushes to his side and drags him to the toilet and orders him to guard the door. Dan announces that Chuck is getting himself into trouble again, but Blair brushes it off, stating that he's merely doing it to get her attention.

Once Dan hears Blair throw up, he begins to get worried and, like Beatrice, assumes that she has gone back to her previous bulimic ways. He voices out his concern and Blair leaves the washroom stall, stating that she was not bulimic, but instead pregnant. However, Beatrice walks into the bathroom just as Blair reveals her pregnancy to Dan. The both of them are shocked, but agree to keep it a secret.

Afterwards, Blair arrives at Dan's loft once again, revealing to him that she is uncertain who the father of her unborn child is. He encourages her to take a test, but she refuses, stating that she'll lose everything if Chuck is the actual father. Dan responds that she will still have him, causing Blair to cry and rest her head on Dan's shoulder. He then kisses her forehead.

However, Blair, being her usual self, still tries to avoid taking the test, but after much persuasion from Dan, she eventually does, and announces that the father is Louis. She then tells Louis that she's pregnant, much to his elation. Soon afterwards, Serena, Nate, Chuck, Louis's mother, Eleanor and Cyrus all know about Blair's pregnancy, and she decides not to keep anymore secrets regarding her unborn child.

Dan decides that it is time for him to tell Blair about his feelings for her, engaged or not, when she comes and visits him at his loft, feeling heavy-hearted and dejected. She tells him that she wishes to be happy again, but has forgotten how to be.

After a very emotional phone call with Chuck, Blair enters Dan's living room heartbroken, looking devastated and emotionally drained. This drives Dan to attempt and bring Chuck and Blair together again, determined to bring joy back into Blair's life. He decides to keep his feelings for Blair quiet and bottled up, only letting Serena know how he feels about her.

Dan leads both Chuck and Blair individually into an enclosed candlelight room. Once they both come face-to-face, Dan closes the door and shows himself out, leaving them both alone. Then, he engages in a discussion with Serena, telling her that all he wants is for Blair to be happy. Serena to tells him that he's one of the good guys, due to his selflessness regarding Blair's happiness.

While Blair and Chuck are whisking away in a limo, planning on running away together and raising Blair's unborn baby as Chuck's child, they both end up in a serious, life-threatening car accident when paparazzi tail them continuously after Charlie sends Gossip Girl a blast, informing her on Chuck and Blair's whereabouts.

The accident causes Serena, who is alongside Nate and Dan, to be more furious at Gossip Girl than ever before, and blames her entirely for the accident caused. Dan monotonously states that she didn't jump on one of the motorcycles and chase Chuck and Blair down the road, but Serena angrily responds that the accident is merely the result of all the amount of damage that Gossip Girl has caused throughout the years. Nate agrees, and he Serena begin planning on taking Gossip Girl down for good, to avenge Chuck and Blair, as Dan anxiously waits for news on Blair.

In the next episode, Blair learns that she lost the baby in the accident, much to her depression and despair. She immediately bursts into tears when the news reaches her. She becomes even more terrified when Serena tells her that Chuck is in serious danger due to losing a large amount of blood. This drives her to make a secret deal with God, promising Him that if He saves Chuck's life, she would marry Louis and not go back to being with Chuck. Once she makes the promise, the nurse informs her that Chuck is asking for her. She decides that this means that God has honored their promise and chooses to further her relationship with Louis, deciding against pursuing her relationship with Chuck.

She informs Dan about her deal and tells him to keep it a secret, to which he agrees. Soon, only Dan and Serena know about Blair's promise. She begins avoiding Chuck and Louis, who collaborate to find out what was going on with Blair, and find pictures of Dan and Blair together in New York, learning that the only man she's not avoiding is Dan.

When she tells him that she needs him, and he responds that he has her, once again confirming that he will be there for her during the hard times.

When Dan walks in on Blair in her wedding dress, he tells her that she looks perfect, making her cry. She says that she can no longer get married in the dress, as now all she sees is everything she's lost. Dan comforts her and tells her that she should change her mind about marrying Louis, but she insists on pursuing the wedding, stating she's committed to him.

They both falsely assume that she's having an affair with Dan, to which she immediately denies. Soon later, she finds Louis's wedding vows, and is pleasantly stunned with how accurately he describes her and how much love the vows display. She tells Serena that she feels as if Louis had "peered into her soul," and now is happy with the decision she had made, believing that Louis is the one for her.

However, unknown to Blair, Dan was the one who wrote the vows, after Louis asked him to. On her wedding day, Blair and Chuck confront each other once again, and Blair declares that she does indeed love him, but cannot be with him. She leaves the room to attend the ceremony, leaving Chuck alone in the room.

Cyrus and Harold both give Blair away, and Dan and Serena walk down the aisle together. However, it appears that someone taped Chuck and Blair's moment, when Blair was professing her love for Chuck to him. It sends Blair running down the aisle and causes her to blame Chuck, assuming he was the one who sent the blast to Gossip Girl. Soon, she returns to the altar, and she and Louis continue the wedding. After Louis and Blair say their vows and take each other as man and wife, Serena tells Dan that she loves him, that she always had and she always will, just before Louis and Blair take their first dance as a married couple. As Blair tells Louis that she's very thankful for giving her a princess title and especially grateful that he gave her another chance, he coldly responds that their wedding was all for show and there is nothing but a contract between them. He tells her that when they're alone, they'll become like strangers to each other.

After the wedding, Dan is certain he has lost Blair to Louis but soon finds out it is a sham wedding when Blair asks him for help to get out of the country and file for a divorce. Taking her to the airport he realizes just how much she needs to get out of this situation and lies to Serena about her whereabouts, this leaves him with a problem when he is discovered with Blair later on.

Soon afterwards, Blair arrives from her honeymoon to Manhattan on Valentine's Day, she tries to set Dan and Serena up once again. However, when Blair notices the lack of interest Dan has in pursuing his old relationship with Serena. She tells him that she attempted to get Dan and Serena back together because she wants Dan to be happy. Blair asks him what it is that would make him happy, and he responds by kissing her, leaving Blair stunned. She, however, does not stop him and instead slowly begins to reciprocate to the kiss. Unfortunately, Serena, alongside Georgina, accidentally intrudes on Dan and Blair. Georgina manages to snap a picture of Dan and Blair's kiss and soon runs away from the scene, driving Dan to chase after her, leaving Blair and stunned and angered Serena alone together. Blair continues to deny having any feelings for Dan during and after the party to both Dan and Serena.

With Serena and Blair's friendship on shaky grounds Dorota decides to lock them in the dining room up for their own good. Blair decides to prove to Serena by spending a whole day with Dan that her feelings are platonic. Unfortunately, she reciprocates another kiss from Dan while Serena accidentally intrudes on them. Serena dictates that Blair is always in denial when it comes to matters of the heart. During a re-enactment of a scene from the Inside novel, Blair realizes that Dan loves her for her and has so for some time. Putting aside her insecurities she admits to both Serena and Dan that she too has feelings for Dan. Serena then gives Blair her blessing, stating that she does not want to be an obstacle in Dan and Blair's relationship. Soon afterwards, Blair pecks a kiss from Dan and heads off to support Serena with her last moments with CeCe.

In "The Princess Dowry" Dan walks in on Blair discussing what could be a potential way out of her prenup on the phone with Cyrus and another lawyer from his firm. Blair shares the details and after saying that she "wouldn't have to wait a year for ... anything" she and Dan exchange smiles.

At CeCe's wake, Chuck outs Dan via Gossip Girl as the sender of the video that was fatal to Blair's marriage. At first, she thinks that it's just a game Chuck is playing and she is unwilling to participate, however, when she sees the guilty looks on Dan's face she realizes that it's the truth. She is mad at him, but forgives him after he tells her that his only reason for sending the video was that he couldn't stand to see Blair so unhappy. Meanwhile, Blair makes a deal with Estee to help her get out of her marriage dowry if there will be no more public mention of it in the media, including Gossip Girl. However, at this time Georgina, who has stolen Dan's phone, teams up with Chuck and sends Gossip Girl a message from Dan's phone uploading the photo of the Valentine's Day kiss, thus ruining Blair's chances of not having to pay the dowry. Dorota shows Blair the blast and she confronts Dan who is confronting Georgina. The latter admits to having been Gossip Girl and it turns out that the deal with Estee was also one of her schemes. Dan goes to confront Chuck, who, after finding out that the blast will bankrupt Blair's family, is regretful, however, he reveals that he has outed Dan for the bad guy he has been and he question whether their friendship was just an act. Blair walks over to them and Chuck tells Dan to be honest and confess that he has been trying to keep him and Blair apart, which Dan does. He apologizes to Blair and leaves. Chuck says that wants Blair and him to try again because all the obstacles that were in their relationship's way are seemingly gone, but Blair tells him that although she loves him, she is not "in love" with him anymore. Later, Georgina visits Blair and promises to get her rid of her dowry in exchange for Blair's support. Blair agrees to this.

In the episode's last scene, Blair goes to Brooklyn. Dan isn't expecting her, as he is assuming she got back together with Chuck. Blair tells him that she isn't there to tell him off and she isn't with Chuck. Dan cracks a joke that clearly expresses his disbelief and surprise at Blair choosing him over the "love of her life," Chuck. She tells him that she told Chuck that he doesn't have her heart anymore as it now belongs to someone else. They kiss and rest their foreheads against each other's. Blair calls him by his first name which amuses Dan and he asks her to "say it again" and they start kissing passionately.

The new couple make a slow and rocky debut on the Upper East side and are faced with numerous challenges including their relations in the bedroom, Blair's lingering feelings for Chuck, and Serena's distaste for their relationship. When Gossip Girl intentionally exposes Blair's secrets on Gossip Girl, Dan comes to terms with Blair's feelings for Chuck, as well as Serena's attempts to sabotage their relationship. In the finale, Dan, having been left by Blair for Chuck, teams up with Georgina in order to write his follow up to "Inside". This time, however, he pledges to write the novel "he should have written from the beginning." Georgina, with her own score to settle with the Upper East side, is more than happy to help.

=== Season 6 ===
In Season 6, Dan tells Serena that the reason he didn't give her an answer to the "I love you" was because it was easier to focus on his anger at Blair, than to face the possibility of getting what he always wanted in the fear of losing it again. Dan also solidifies his love by telling Georgina and Rufus that he had a plan all along to win and that there is no winning without Serena.

In the finale, Dan reveals to Serena their first meeting at a party, where Dan first spoke to her and fell madly in love. Dan realized at that party that he could never pull Serena out of her world but he couldn't give up either. He realized that the only way he could get Serena was to write himself into the Upper East Side drama by using a blog to create a legend; the blog came to be known as Gossip Girl. Serena was overjoyed at the revelation, stating that Dan, through Gossip Girl, had written her and everyone else a seven-year love letter and made her realize that she belongs on the Upper East Side with Dan.

Five years later, Dan and Serena get married, surrounded by their closest friends and family.

=== 2021 sequel series ===
Dan does not appear in the 2021 sequel series but his Gossip Girl blog is featured in the first episode when Kate Keller finds it and decides to relaunch it on Instagram. In the episode "How to Bury a Millionaire" from season two, Georgina reveals that he lives in Brooklyn Heights and is still married to Serena. Georgina also revealed that the couple has a kid.

== Reception ==
Dan Humphrey’s character has garnered much media recognition. Alfonso Espina of The Huffington Post declared that Dan was the “Nick Carraway character we viewers could live vicariously through.” Jason Gay of Rolling Stone praised Badgley’s characterisation, claiming that “while another actor may have played Dan as a blah straight man, Badgley imbued him with an occasionally obnoxious know-it-all-ness.” The New Yorker cited Dan as “the token-boho character”; while, New York Magazine described Badgley’s Dan as “the moralistic outsider, or what passes for one on a show produced by the guy who created The O.C.”. Jarett Wieselman of Entertainment Tonight asserted that “charming and disarming in equal measure, Badgley's incarnation of the Brooklyn-boy gone bad was always a comedic and emotional highlight.”

Other colleagues have also commented on Dan Humphrey’s character. Blake Lively, Badgley’s co-star, declared that "Dan was supposed to be the goofy, nerdy guy who felt like he never measured up to other people, but Penn [Badgley] decided to play it a little more arrogant. Like he's smarter than these spoiled little brats." The series executive producer, Stephanie Savage, claimed that “as he [Dan Humphrey] is the outsider, he's somebody who when he's pointing out what's absurd about the world, you have to believe he's smart enough to get it and also deliver it in a way that you find it kind of amusing and not just critical or judgmental.”
