= Vanessa Abrams =

- Gossip Girl character
- Jessica Szohr as Vanessa Abrams
- First appearance: Novel: Gossip Girl; Television: "The Handmaiden's Tale" (episode 1.06)
- Last appearance: Novel: I Will Always Love You; Television: "New York, I Love You XOXO" (episode 6.10)
- Created by: Character; Cecily von Ziegesar; Developed for Television; Josh Schwartz; Stephanie Savage
- Portrayed by: Jessica Szohr

In-universe information
- Full name: Novel: Vanessa Marigold Abrams; Television: Vanessa Abrams
- Aliases: Novel: V Television: V, Brooklyn, Documentary Girls
- Occupation: Novels: Filmmaker (currently); College Student at New York University (graduated); High school student (graduated); Television: Filmmaker; Waitress (former); CNN production intern (formerly in Haiti); Publicist; College student (at New York; departed)
- Family: Novel: Arlo and Gabriela Abrams (parents); Ruby Abrams (sister); Moxie (niece); Norma Desmond (pet; dog); Television: Arlo and Gabriela Abrams (parents); Ruby Abrams (sister)

Vanessa Marigold Abrams is a fictional character in the Gossip Girl novel series. She is portrayed by Jessica Szohr in the television adaptation. Vanessa was introduced on the first season as a recurring character, but became a series regular after a successful run due to the popularity of her character. She left the series at the end of the fourth season.

== Novel series ==
Vanessa Marigold Abrams is a filmmaker. She is the younger daughter of two older alternative hippie artists, Arlo and Gabriela Abrams. She lives in a Williamsburg, Brooklyn apartment with her older sister Rudy and Ruby’s parrot, named Tofu.

Vanessa attends Constance Billard School for Girls, where she is an anomaly, as she calls herself in the first book, since unlike her classmates, she cares little about her appearance or social events. Rebellious, nonconformist and provocative, she shaves her head in tenth grade in order to set herself apart from the other students; girls she refuses to socialize with and who constantly gush over her black hair. She reads Tolstoy's War and Peace repeatedly, listens to Belle and Sebastian and Gregorian chants and drinks unsweetened black tea.

During her teenage years, she adopts a punk aesthetic (shaved head, black turtlenecks, upper-lip piercing, and steel-toed Doc Martens)), accompanied by a hostile attitude and a constant stream of sarcasm, behavior that stands in stark contrast to the glamorous, well-mannered heroines of the series. But this is, of course, only a façade meant to conceal her insecurities, hiding a sensitive and generous nature underneath.

Vanessa is also the founder of Constance Billard’s students-run arts magazine, Rancor). In book 7, she becomes Blair Waldorf’s new roommate and it appears that the young socialite’s personality begins to rub off on the rebel: Vanessa starts wearing colors, paying more attention to her appearance, and opening up to the world with newfound warmth. She even begins a brief romance with Blair’s stepbrother, Aaron Rose.

During her senior year, a renowned alternative filmmaker, Ken Mogul, notices her work and offers to screen one of her short films at the fashion show of a famous designer (Jedediah Angel) during New York Fashion Week. Later, he even hires her as an assistant director on one of his shoots. On graduation day, she received from her headmaster the Georgia O'Keeffe Award for Creative excellence, a prestigious prize recognizing the outstanding creative achievements of a Constance Billard School for Girls student.

From the very beginning of the series, we learn that Vanessa is deeply and secretly in love with her best friend, Daniel Humphrey, whom she met two years earlier at a party where they both ended up locked outside. During their senior year, the two begin a romantic relationship, though it proves unstable, marked by numerous breakups and reconciliations.

Initially intimidated by Serena — whose place in Dan’s heart she envies — Vanessa eventually gets to know her and becomes one of her friends. At the same time, she forms a close friendship with Jenny Humphrey, with whom she collaborates on the Rancor magazine.

After high school, Vanessa enrolls at New York University, where she studies film for four years and eventually lets her hair grow out again. Her boyfriend at the time gives her a small dog — Norma Desmond, half chow-chow, half poodle — whom she adopts as her pet. Meanwhile, her sister Ruby marries Piotr, a Czech painter, and they have a daughter named Moxie.

During her final year of university, Vanessa has been offered a fellowship by Filmmakers for Change, allowing her to travel to Indonesia for a film project for 2 years. By the end of the series, Dan and Vanessa realize they still love each other and finally confess it.

Vanessa has fair skin, red lips and large hazel eyes; she is slim but has a bit of softness around her stomach, some fat on her hips and slightly chubby thighs. She has four large brown moles behind one ear, highly arched feet and alternates between a shaved head and long, sleek, jet-black hair. She gets her upper lip pierced on her eighteenth birthday.

== Television series ==
=== Casting ===
After a recurring role in the short-lived series What About Brian, Yahoo! stated her "capitalizing on that minor success" and eventually earned the role of "the stunning and unpredictable aspiring filmmaker ensconced in the highly dramatic lives of privileged teenagers on Manhattan's Upper East Side world". Szohr began her stint on Gossip Girl in a recurring role until her promotion to regular status in the show's fourteenth episode. Szohr said in Nylon magazine: Producers originally didn’t want to cast her on Gossip Girl because her straight, shiny hair was too preppy. "I told my agent, you send every picture of my hair short, curly, black, blonde, I don’t care." In Teen Vogue, she said the story of how she snagged her breakthrough role on Gossip Girl: "Two of my friends in L.A. invited me to this Labor Day barbecue, but I really just wanted to stay on the couch with my French bulldog," she says. "I remember hanging out by the pool in an old T-shirt and jean shorts, just talking to people. Three days later, my manager calls to tell me that I'd been with the show's executive producer and one of the creators and they want me to audition." Less than a week after that, Jessica was on her way to New York.

=== Characterization ===
Szohr's character enters the wealthy world of Manhattan and occasional love interest of her longtime best friend, Dan Humphrey. People magazine cites her television portrayal of her character especially Ziegesar saying that Vanessa on the show "has more of a bohemian hipster look". During an interview for Ocean Drive magazine Szohr commented on her character's noted honesty, stating that "Vanessa doesn't change for other people. She says what she thinks, and that's a hard thing to do in high school[...] she’s just a badass girl from Brooklyn". Szohr finds her character as the most relatable series since Vanessa doesn't have the same lifestyle as most of the other wealthy characters on the show do. During an interview for Vanity Fair, Eric Daman described Vanessa's style as "a breath of fresh air. She’s the Lower East Side, Raising Victor Vargas home-girl." and cited two-time Grammy award-winning artist M.I.A. as an influence.

=== Season 1 ===
Vanessa is officially introduced in the sixth episode of the season, entitled "The Handmaiden's Tale." While talking on the phone with Dan, she appears on his fire escape and the two gladly reunite. She announces that she's decided to move back to the city and live with her sister, Ruby. She also mentions that she missed Dan while she was away and has repeatedly thought about the last words he said to her before she moved to Vermont. Vanessa helps Dan's younger sister, Jenny Humphrey, sneak into a masquerade ball, and she decides to sneak in herself, where she spots Dan and attempts to reconcile their relationship. It is then revealed that Dan's last words to Vanessa were "I love you," but despite this fact, Dan says that he's moved on and is dating Serena. Vanessa gets teary-eyed and abandons the party, however the two friends make up later in Dan's bedroom. They share a snack while Dan fills her in on everything that's changed in his life.

In " Victor/Victrola," Vanessa acts as a mentor for Jenny, giving the young blond some advice about parental issues. She seems to express some jealousy when she stumbles in on Dan and Serena about to have sex. However, in the next episode, she and Serena bond over Guitar Hero after Dan explains that Vanessa is his best friend and that the two will always share a special bond from their childhood. Later, Serena and Vanessa engage in conversation and get to know each other better. On Christmas Day, Serena feels a bit jealous when Vanessa gets Dan the perfect present (by publishing his short story in The New Yorker). Vanessa makes a rival out of Blair Waldorf when Blair suspects her of liking Dan as 'more than a friend.' Despite her suspicions, Vanessa helps Serena create the only thing Dan wanted for Christmas – snow.

In "School Lies," Vanessa accompanies Dan to a pool party on school property. Someone nearly dies at the party, however, and when Vanessa catches a confidential conversation between Chuck and Blair on camera, it becomes the most sought-after item on the Upper East Side. Chuck tries to bribe Vanessa into giving her the tape, but she tricks him and takes his money anyway. When Blair asks for the tape, Vanessa concedes without any conditions attached hoping that Blair would stop antagonizing her. Despite this, Blair pays Vanessa's rent for a year to thank her for giving up the tape, which would have ruined Blair's reputation.

When the SATs roll around, Vanessa helps Dan with his studying. This leads to her official introduction to Nate Archibald. The two bicker and banter light-heartedly, but when Vanessa finds a practice essay Nate wrote for the SATs, she sees a more vulnerable side to him. The two spend the day together and Vanessa listens to his problems. Despite their coming from different worlds, they realize they have a lot in common and end the night with a kiss. The next day, Nate takes Vanessa on a 'surprise date' where he tells her she should take the SATs just to ensure that she has options. He pays and registers for her, and after finally giving in, the two enter into a relationship. When she finds out that Georgina Sparks is not who she says she is, Vanessa confronts her and says she knows her real name, as well as her intentions. Despite this fact, Georgina escapes with Dan, who continues to believe the lies she tells him.

In the season finale, "Much 'I Do About Nothing" Vanessa prepares for Lily and Bart Bass's wedding. Once she's all dressed up in one of Jenny's designs, Dan tells her that she 'cleans up nice,' before the two proceed to the wedding together. After the ceremony, Nate, burdened by the myriad of problems with his father, tells Vanessa he's not ready to be in a relationship, and the two break up. Later, Vanessa and Dan's friendship grows as they bond over their break-ups.

=== Season 2 ===
Vanessa spends the summer redecorating Rufus's art gallery and turning the extra space into a cafe. Nate confides in her the financial circumstances of his father's debts and although the two seem interested in each other, Nate is continuously too busy to hang out with her. Vanessa pushes him away because of this, but he confesses that he does want a relationship with her. During a citywide blackout, however, the older woman Nate slept with throughout the summer, Catherine, threatens to turn Nate's father in to the police if Nate ever leaves her. Vanessa sacrifices her relationship with Nate for the Captain's safety and tells Nate she doesn't want to be with him. Later, Vanessa snaps a photo of Catherine when she sees the older woman making out with her stepson, hoping to use it as blackmail. She learns the consequences of her meddling, however, when she realizes that telling Catherine's husband of her affairs left Nate as penniless as ever, whereas Blair was going to gain back the Archibald's riches. Nate becomes upset with Vanessa, not because she made him lose the money, but because she never confided in him.

Vanessa helps Jenny convince Rufus to let her do home-schooling. She further displays her charitable side by helping save the Brooklyn Inn from auction and petitioning for landmark status. When Blair refuses to cooperate with the charity, Vanessa blackmails her by using the photo of Catherine and Lord Marcus kissing, which, if exploited, would humiliate Blair. The Queen of Constance is therefore forced to comply but conspires with Chuck to destroy Vanessa. The two intend to seduce and humiliate her. At Lily's housewarming party, Vanessa witnesses the more vulnerable side of Chuck, and the two bond briefly. She's embarrassed, however, when she learns it was all Blair's ploy and turns her back on them both. During Jenny's guerrilla fashion show, Vanessa spots Nate and Jenny kissing. She feels betrayed by both of them since she still has feelings for Nate and since she and Jenny were such close friends. In turn, on Thanksgiving, Vanessa hides an important letter from Jenny. This letter was a confession of Nate's feelings for Jenny and his desire to be with her. Not knowing about the letter that was kept from her, Jenny reconciles her friendship with Vanessa.

Around Christmastime, Vanessa and Nate repair their relationship, which they try to hide from Jenny. Vanessa however feels guilty about hiding the letter from Jenny and confides in Nate. The blond discovers a picture of them kissing on Gossip Girl, however, and embarrasses Vanessa by giving her a see-through dress, which everyone mocks at the Snowflake Ball. A teary-eyed Vanessa runs off, leaving Nate to tell Jenny that she's not the girl he thought she was. He chooses Vanessa and the two speed away in a taxi as a brokenhearted Jenny watches from afar. Vanessa tries not to interfere with Serena and Dan's relationship and instead celebrates her 2-month anniversary with Nate at the opera, where the two happily kiss and mock the other theater-goers.

When the seniors of Constance Billiard and St. Jude's are forced to put on a play, Nate worries that Vanessa is attracted to the play's director, seeing as the two have so much in common. This leads to a heated argument between Vanessa and him, in which the two fight about their differences and insecurities. Later, Vanessa goes to Nate's house and they make up, deciding to watch the Age of Innocence together.

Vanessa and Nate make plans to travel Europe together over summer break. Nate feels manipulated by his family to intern at the mayor's office and Vanessa worries that he's being controlled by his grandfather. Eventually, Nate decides he will intern for the mayor, which he announces in a speech. After hearing this, a disappointed Vanessa leaves the party. She goes over to the Humphreys, where she tells Jenny that her relationship with Nate might in fact be over.

A week later, Vanessa and Chuck see Blair and Nate hugging. The two then conspire to tear their friendship apart. Vanessa attempts to make Nate jealous by kissing Chuck at Jenny's party, but when Nate and Blair appear unfazed, Vanessa and Chuck really do sleep together. In "Southern Gentlemen Prefer Blondes," Vanessa and Dan play the drinking game I Never, in which she admits to sleeping with Chuck twice and regretting it both times. In the season finale, Vanessa and Nate catch up and become friends at the Constance-St. Jude's Graduation. A week later, Nate tells her that the mayor hit on him, so he quit his internship. He and Vanessa reinstate their summer plans to go backpacking through Europe. The two unknowingly get to know Scott Rosson, the lovechild of Lily and Rufus. Afterwards, Dan receives a suspicious phone call from Georgina who tells both Vanessa and Dan that she'll be seeing them at NYU next year.

=== Season 3 ===
It's revealed that Vanessa did indeed spend her summer backpacking through Europe with Nate and the two had a fling one night, but remain good friends and nothing more. When she returns to New York, she gets to know Scott Ronsson, and develops a crush on him. When she discovers that Dan's been living the high life thanks to the van der Woodsens and has been hiding it from her, she fights with him and eventually tells him that despite his wealth, he needs to be himself in order for her to be friends with him. Scott and Vanessa begin dating and Scott encourages Vanessa to stay friends with Dan. When Vanessa moves into her dorm at NYU, she realizes that she shares the hall with Blair Waldorf and Georgina Sparks. Vanessa and Georgina become friends after Vanessa forgives her for her past behavior, whereas Vanessa and Blair's rivalry deepens. She grows suspicious of Scott and eventually discovers he is not a student at NYU. When she confronts him, he confesses that he's Lily and Rufus' son and she encourages him to tell them. Scott eventually tells Lily and Rufus the truth at their wedding and moves back to Boston, promising to come down and visit the now broken-hearted Vanessa.

Famous actress Olivia Burke becomes Vanessa's new roommate, and the two become immediate friends. Olivia and Dan embark on a relationship, but when they have a threesome with Vanessa, the trio become awkward around each other, resulting in Vanessa and Olivia fighting over Dan. Once Olivia realizes that Dan's true feelings lie with Vanessa, she breaks up with him and moves out of NYU to continue pursuing her acting career. Dan finally confessed his love for Vanessa, who becomes confused and tries to brush off the subject. Later, however, she admits that she loves him as well and that although she doesn't want to ruin her friendship with him, she wants to explore these feelings, starting with being "friends with benefits". The two finally begin their relationship.

Their relationship becomes problematic when Vanessa secretly applies to NYU's program for writers, Tisch, which Dan has also applied for. Despite their competition, Vanessa is chosen by the program and although this causes further issues between the two, Dan eventually expresses pride in Vanessa. Later, however, their relationship hits another obstacle when Dan discovers that Vanessa has received an offer difficult to reject: to work in Haiti, assisting the disaster aid as well as filming for CNN. When Dan tells Vanessa he knows she's been offered this position, she insists on not going and staying in the city with Dan to work on their relationship. Dan eventually convinces Vanessa to accept the offer, however, when he informs her that it's a once in a lifetime opportunity. Thus, Vanessa says a tearful goodbye to Dan and leaves, the couple planning on engaging in a long-distance relationship.

In the finale, while Vanessa is still in Haiti, Nate sends her a Gossip Girl blast that includes a picture of Dan and Serena in bed together, implying that Dan has cheated on her.

=== Season 4 ===
Vanessa returns from Haiti to find Dan with Georgina. Suspecting a relationship between the two, Vanessa is shocked to discover that they are raising his son, Milo. Vanessa confronts Dan regarding Milo's paternity and realizes that Dan has kept his son's existence from his immediate family. Before Georgina leaves for an extended vacation, she answers a call from Vanessa, who tells her to pass a message to Dan that she will be there for him when he needs her. After meeting Juliet Sharp, Vanessa gets entangled in one of her schemes to break the love triangle between Dan, Nate and Serena, using Vanessa's feelings for Dan to sway him away from Serena. Vanessa later finds out that Dan does not feel the same way about her after sex but Dan comes forward to her and professes his love. With Dan's struggles in raising Milo increase, Vanessa offers her aid to raise him and moves in with him. Dan accepts but Georgina returns to take Milo from Dan. Vanessa unsuccessfully attempts to comfort Dan on losing his son but only succeeds in driving him towards Serena and avoid facing his problems. Dan lies about his whereabouts until Vanessa finds out that he will be arriving at a party with Serena. Realizing his mistake, Dan and Vanessa reconcile and resume their relationship. With Serena's enrollment in Columbia, Gossip Girl spreads a blast implying that Serena has a sexually transmitted disease, causing Vanessa and Juliet to panic considering that their respective partners have a sexual history with Serena. Hoping to confirm on whether or not Dan had slept with Serena and if he still had residual feelings for her, Vanessa and Juliet steal Serena's phone. Vanessa happily finds out that Dan loves her and discovers that Juliet was responsible for another blast against Serena, one stating that she was soliciting sex for grades. Fearing backlash against her, Juliet frames Vanessa for the blast, causing Vanessa to leave and effectively ending her relationship with Dan. In the aftermath of ruining Blair's 20th birthday, Vanessa listens to Dan's troubles, replying to his conclusion on the contagious scheming of the Upper East side by saying that they need rest and a good dose of Brooklyn.

Nate turns to Vanessa when he uncovers one of her lies and she accepts, knowing that helping Nate would clear her name. Distracting Juliet from returning to her apartment, Nate calls off their scheme when he finds out about Juliet's background but Vanessa sneaked in, finding pictures of Serena kissing her college professor, Colin. Vanessa confronts Juliet, hoping to recruit her in vindicating her name and exposing Serena but Juliet declines her offer, unaware that Vanessa took the pictures with her. When she plans on confronting the Dean of Columbia at a Ballet performance, she is temporarily stopped by Juliet who decides to go along with the scheme. When the two try to present the photos to the Dean they are thwarted by Blair and Chuck who cover for Serena.

Determined to take down Serena and her supposed immunity to conflict, her, Juliet, and Jenny begin to plot to separate Serena's loved ones from her and thus make her alone. Their plan goes smoothly and Lily, Nate, Dan, and Blair all blame her for her actions at Chuck's "Saint and Sinner" party. But unknown to Vanessa and Jenny, Juliet took Serena and drugged her forcing her to be admitted into a rehabilitation center. To save herself from the retribution of everyone hating her, she confesses to Rufus but blames the entire thing on Jenny. Later on, Jenny confesses all to Blair, and rather than face confrontation she calls her mom and temporarily moves in.

Following Charlie's mental breakdown at the Constance Billiard alumni party, Vanessa scouts out Dan's apartment to look for her but instead finds a novel that Dan has been working on and reads it. When Dan calls her if she found Charlie, Vanessa pours out her admiration for Dan's work and suggests that he publish it, further concluding that in the five years that he wrote the novel, she deduced Dan's secret desire to be a part of the Upper East side, one that even surpasses Jenny's from years ago. Dan had been reluctant to publish it, fearing backlash against his friends for writing a novel that satirizes them. Vanessa tells him to stop dropping everything for his friends and instead be a great person, stating that he was a better person before he met Serena. Dan angrily shoots back at her, saying that his life was better before she climbed into his fire escape years ago. Vanessa steals his manuscript and has it published. When asked where the money will be directed, Vanessa reveals that she will be living in Spain and that she'll make sure the money goes to the right place.

=== Season 6 ===
Vanessa received an SMS which reveals that Dan was "Gossip Girl". Her cameo was filmed on the set of the Sex and the City prequel, The Carrie Diaries; the producers like to imagine that she was directing an episode.

== Reception ==
Originally set for a four- or five-episode guest appearance, Yahoo! cites Szohr "who so clicked with viewers that producers eventually added her to series regular status." Szohr's performance even led her to making People magazine's famous yearly list of its "Most Beautiful People" in 2008. Szohr's portrayal of Vanessa in the TV series has drawn criticism from Ziegesar, who claimed Vanessa is "one character they ruined", in response to the show's deviation from the novels where Vanessa is bald and often clothed in black. TV Guide named her one of TV's Worst-Dressed Characters.

Isabelle Carreau of TV Squad brushed off initial fans' dislike of the character when reviewing the second-season episode, The Dark Night, stating "I'm glad that, contrary to how most characters on GG react, Vanessa didn't scream, throw things, and pull hair when telling Nate how disappointed in him she is. Vanessa is not my favorite character, but she is slowly growing on me because of the calmness and maturity she can show.".

Regarding the direction of her character as the show progressed to its fourth season, Vanessa received negative reviews from critics. Mark O. Estes from Tv Overmind was displeased with her character inconsistency that she displayed on the fourth-season episode, Gaslit, stating "even I can't speak up for her throwing Jenny under the bus the way she did," and further expressed disappointment that the show's writers are catering to fans' negative reception of Vanessa. TV Guide heavily panned the character, describing her direction "from a borderline interesting counterpoint to all the glamour of her surroundings to a sniveling buttinsky with nothing better to do than meddle for the sole sake of spoiling everyone's fun," laying out the possibility of her character leaving or becoming a villain. On May 9, 2011, it was announced that Taylor Momsen and Jessica Szohr would not be back as series regulars for the fifth season of the show, although both have been invited back as guest stars. Szohr left the show after discussing with producers on the direction of her character, having felt that her portrayal of Vanessa had run its course. "I had so much fun and I made friends I'll have for a lifetime and it was so great to work in the city, but I got the most I could out of Vanessa."
