= Jenny Humphrey =

Jennifer Talullah Humphrey
- Gossip Girl and The It Girl character
- Taylor Momsen as Jenny Humphrey
- First appearance: Novel: Gossip Girl (Gossip Girl series); The It Girl (The It Girl series); Television: "Pilot" (episode 1.01)
- Last appearance: Novel: Nothing Can Keep Us Together (Gossip Girl series); Classic (The It Girl series); Television: "New York, I Love You XOXO" (episode 6.10)
- Created by: Character: Cecily von Ziegesar; Developed for television: Josh Schwartz; Stephanie Savage
- Portrayed by: Taylor Momsen

In-universe information
- Aliases: J, Little J, Queen J, Erica Van Der Woodsen, Blair Waldorf, Claire
- Nicknames: Novels: Jenny (by everyone except Nate and Vanessa); J Television: Jenny; Little J Queen J Queen Jenny
- Occupation: Novels: College Student at the Rhode Island School of Design (currently); High school student (at Constance Billard; expelled) (at Waverly Academy; graduated); The Raves Singer (formerly); Television: High school student (at Constance Billard; departed); College student (at Central Saint Martins); Fashion designer Drug dealer (former)
- Family: Novels: Rufus Humphrey (father); Daniel "Dan" Humphrey (older brother); Jeanette Humphrey (mother; estranged); Marx (pet; cat); Sophia (aunt); Television: Rufus Humphrey (father); Daniel "Dan" Humphrey (older brother); Alison Humphrey (mother); Lillian "Lily" Humphrey (ex-stepmother); Scott Rosson (paternal half-brother); Serena van der Woodsen (ex-paternal stepsister/sister-in-law); Eric van der Woodsen (ex-paternal stepbrother); Charles "Chuck" Bass (ex-adoptive stepbrother)

Jennifer Tallulah Humphrey is one of the characters in both the Gossip Girl and The It Girl series of novels by Cecily von Ziegesar. She is portrayed by Taylor Momsen in the Gossip Girl television adaptation on The CW.

== Novel series ==
=== Gossip Girl ===
Fourteen-year-old (twelve in the prequel) Jennifer Tallulah Humphrey is the youngest main character in the Gossip Girl saga. She lives in a run-down Upper West Side apartment with her father, Rufus Humphrey — a bohemian, beatnik editor of minor Beat Generation poets — her older brother Dan, three years her senior, and their cat, Marx. She has very few contact with her mother, Jeannette, an exuberant hippie artist who abruptly abandoned the family home to move to Prague to focus on her art and married there a wealthy aristocrat.

Jenny is a talented painter who greatly admires Serena and wants to be like her. Blessed with a very generous chest and a mass of curly hair, she is often the target of mockery. She also works for her school’s arts magazine, Rancor, founded by Vanessa.

Throughout the series, Jenny tries by all possible means to integrate herself into the glamorous world of the rich, popular, older girls at her private school, Constance Billard. Ambitious, she repeatedly manages to get invited to parties held by senior students despite her modest social status and even begins a modeling career with Serena’s help (she appeared in the W Magazine). In the first book, Chuck sexually assaults her in the toilets during the Kiss On the Lips Party but she manages to call Dan and Serena who save her. Later, having a lovely voice, she is also hired as the singer for the trendy rock band The Raves, replacing her brother.

At the beginning of the series, she briefly dated the highly sought-after Nate Archibald. At the end of her 9th grade, she requests a transfer to an exclusive boarding school where she decides to reinvent herself and become a true “It Girl,” just like Serena van der Woodsen. Jenny’s best friend is Elise Wells.

At eighteen, after leaving the boarding school with her high school diploma in hand, she is admitted to the Rhode Island School of Design, where she studies drawing.

Jenny is described as being very short (around 5'0") and slim; she has brown, curly hair, a straight and severe fringe across her forehead, large hazel eyes, a round face sprinkled with freckles, a milky skin and a very ample chest (a 34E at fourteen).

=== The It Girl ===
At the end of 9th grade, Jenny is expelled from high school after a press photo showing her in a compromising position with the members of her band circulates. She therefore leaves Constance Billard School for girls to attend Waverly Academy, an elite boarding school in New York horse country where glamorous rich kids don't let the rules get in the way of an excellent time. Jenny is determined to leave her crazy Manhattan past behind and become a sophisticated goddess on campus. There, she meets her new roommates Callie Vernon and Brett Messerschmidt, two of the most popular girls on campus. She quickly learns that she has replaced their old best friend, the extremely attractive and notorious Tinsley Carmichael. Jenny desperately wants to gain Tinsley's acceptance and finally be a part of the popular crowd, but along the way she begins to wonder what price she will have to pay to achieve that goal. To make matters worse she falls hard for Callie's estranged boyfriend, Easy Walsh.

She soon becomes close friends with Brett and another classmate, Kara Whalen. Although she initially earns Callie’s hostility because of the attraction her boyfriend feels for her, and Tinsley Carmichael (aka Waverly former Queen)’s resentment for winning over her former friends and taking her place as the school’s It Girl, she eventually gains their friendship too.

== TV series ==
=== Season 1 ===
Jenny Humphrey is introduced in Season 1. A pretty, blonde freshman at Constance Billard, she tries desperately to fit in with Blair's clique, but Blair makes it difficult for her, subjecting Jenny to the rules of high school hierarchy. A possible friendship ends when Blair discovers Nate's lingering feelings for Serena and Jenny's interest in Nate, entailing further cruelty to Jenny. When Blair's affair with Chuck Bass is exposed, Nate approaches Jenny and Blair's affair is made public. Blair's friends shun her for her hypocrisy and establish Jenny as the new Queen Bee of Constance Billard. Despite being one of the school It Girls, she is driven to prove herself. Lacking self-confidence because she is not as rich as the other girls, she sells her sewing machine and barters an expensive dress she stole from one of her friends. When Blair throws her a surprise birthday party, the other girls discover that Jenny stole the dress, bringing Blair's scheme to fruition. Jenny retaliates by bringing Nate with her to Blair's victory party and winning the girls to her side. Jenny and Blair then struggle for the position of Queen Bee. Jenny thinks she's found true love with Asher Hornsby, but their romance is short-lived when she discovers that he is gay. He convinces her to say that she lost her virginity to him in order to dispel the rumors that he is gay, promising that as long as she pretends it's true, he'll give her privileges that the Upper East Side can offer. But Blair and Eric out Asher at his own party, and Jenny confesses that she lied about having sex with him. Blair's clique abandons her once again, and she later finds Blair to tell her that she's won as it's "not worth it". In the season finale, Jenny receives an internship at Blair's mother Eleanor's company.

=== Season 2 ===
At the beginning of season 2, Jenny spends her summer working hard as a new intern for Eleanor Waldorf Designs. She apologizes to Eric for her behavior the previous season. He forgives her and invites her to the White Party in the Hamptons, where he introduces her to Tinsley Mortimer and she proves her worth to one of Eleanor's supervisors.

Eleanor fires Jenny after a critical remark about one of her dresses, but during a citywide blackout, Eleanor realizes her talent and hires Jenny. After constant harassment by Blair's minions, Jenny decides to skip school to pursue a future in fashion.

Blair and Serena have another fight about Serena's growing popularity, and Jenny is dragged into it during Eleanor's fashion show. When she changes the seating arrangement Blair had planned, Blair retaliates by telling Rufus that Jenny has been skipping school, and he confronts her. Blair attempts to sabotage Jenny's work in the show but Jenny improvises, proposing that Serena and the socialites walk the runway. In an effort to ruin Serena, Blair switches the final dress with one that Jenny made, drawing Eleanor's ire. The dress is a huge hit with the audience and the fashion show is a big success. Jenny realizes Blair's frustrations with her friendship with Serena, commenting that they have worked hard for what they’ve wanted and Serena just glides through. Eleanor later praises Jenny for her work.

Rufus eventually agrees to Jenny being home-schooled after seeing how committed and good at her job she is. At work, Jenny befriends Agnes Andrews (Willa Holland), a model who convinces her to start her own fashion line. Realizing that working for Eleanor won't help her develop as a designer and that Eleanor has begun to take advantage of her talents, Jenny leaves. Jenny also begins a short relationship with Nate when they share a passionate kiss after he rescues her from being taken advantage of by an older photographer. Jenny and Rufus argue over her quitting Eleanor's and Jenny moves out of the Humphreys' apartment and moves in with Agnes, who suggests that they plan a guerrilla fashion show at the charity gala honoring Lily and Bart. The show is a big success but Vanessa witnesses her kissing Nate, thereby straining their friendship. Rufus tries to get her arrested but is stopped by Lily. Agnes's fiery temper and their growing disagreements over the clothing line make it hard for them to close a business deal. Jenny steals Agnes's contact list, attempting to make a deal by herself. Upon learning of Jenny's betrayal, Agnes burns all her dresses and kicks her out of her apartment, leaving her with nothing.

Upon learning that she is too young to start her own business, she attempts to file for emancipation, but Rufus refuses. On Thanksgiving, Lily finds the papers after discovering that Jenny has been hiding in their apartment with Eric, and warns Rufus. Rufus and Jenny reconcile after a little persuasion from Eleanor and she returns home. During the Snowflake Ball, Jenny learns that Vanessa and Nate are back together even though Vanessa was aware of Nate's feelings for her. Nate breaks up with her after she helps to humiliate Vanessa at the ball. Jenny returns to Constance and is forced to contend with Blair's minions.

During the season finale and Serena's hunt for Gossip Girl, Jenny decides to compete to be the next Queen Bee after Blair leaves. She almost drops out, but Blair gives her a touching speech about keeping her eye on the prize. In the end Blair chooses Jenny and crowns her queen of Constance.

=== Season 3 ===
After Jenny fails to bring about egalitarianism at Constance, she resolves to rule as Queen Bee with her own group of minions. With her new position and wealth, Jenny's social-climbing persona resurfaces and she begins to erase her former Brooklyn self, throwing away her homemade clothes and sewing machine. Worried that Jenny is turning into a typical Queen Bee, Eric and Jonathan attempt an intervention, but are humiliated by Jenny and her clique. Eric teams up with Blair to take down Jenny at the Cotillion Ball by sabotaging her escort. The plan backfires, and Jenny instead secures Nate to escort her, winning her the respect of the Queens at every prep school on the Upper East Side. As a consequence of Eric's scheming, Jonathan breaks up with him and a rift emerges in Jenny and Eric's relationship.

Chuck introduces her to Damien Dalgaard, son of the Belgian ambassador, who deals drugs. Liking his wild lifestyle, Jenny strikes up a relationship with him and helps him supply drugs to his customers while sharing in some of the profit, even stealing some of Lily's “headache pills”. Lily and Rufus find out about the drugs, which Damien covers up with a story about his father. Against Rufus's will, Jenny continues her relationship with Damien, who seems interested in taking it further. Jenny, who is a virgin, backs out at the last minute, causing Damien to break up with her, leaving her to face her family.

At Rufus's suggestion, Eleanor reemploys Jenny to help out with her upcoming fashion show. Jenny is happy to be back, but is shocked to learn that one of the models she’ll be working with is Agnes, who, after the show finishes, takes revenge on Jenny by drugging her and leaving her in a bar to be taken advantage of. Nate rescues Jenny before anything happens to her. Because of this, Jenny's feelings for Nate reawaken and she aspires to win him over. She tries to kiss him but he resists her advances because he sees her only as a friend and because he is dating Serena. Jenny attempts to sabotage Serena and Nate's relationship by lying to Serena and implying to Nate that she is having an affair with Carter Baizen. Jenny's attempts fail, and her relationship with both is left tenuous after Nate kicks her out of his apartment.

At a gala event where Serena's recently returned father William Van Der Woodsen is making a speech, a former client of Damien's approaches Jenny, angrily telling her the drugs she sold her (Lily's cancer medication) gave her a yeast infection. Rufus overhears this and grounds Jenny to the Humphrey apartment in Brooklyn. During her punishment, Jenny researches Lily's medicine and tells Chuck there is something very wrong with the medication Serena's father is prescribing her. It is discovered that William has lied to Lily about her condition and been giving her drugs that make her sick in a plot to win her back from Rufus. Seeing an opportunity to break up Rufus and Lily and return her family to the way it was before, Jenny attempts to sabotage Blair, Chuck, and Nate's plan to unveil William's deception. When William is about to be held accountable, she quickly runs to William and warns him, telling him the police are coming to get him, and urges him to escape. Back at the van der Woodsen penthouse she reveals that she warned William and says she wishes her family could go back to normal: "When I lived in Brooklyn, I may have had to ride the subway to school, and make my own clothes, but at least our family was happy". Rufus says the only thing that needs to return to normal is Jenny. Eric is hurt by Jenny's attempt to leave the family, and says that if she wants out, no one is forcing her to stay.

Jenny hits rock bottom after sending Gossip Girl a picture of Dan and Serena in bed together, jeopardizing Dan and Nate's friendship, Dan and Vanessa's relationship, and breaking up Nate and Serena's relationship. Blair confronts Jenny, telling her, “Nate loves Serena, Dan loves Vanessa — God knows why — and Chuck loves me. But you, Jenny? No one loves you except your daddy. And after what you pulled yesterday, who knows if that's even true anymore?” Emotionally distressed, Jenny goes to Nate's apartment but instead finds Chuck devastated over his break-up with Blair and in her state of vulnerability, Jenny loses her virginity to Chuck. Afterward, Blair arrives willing to take Chuck back and Jenny sneaks out. She breaks down in tears to Eric, telling him that everyone hates her and that she slept with Chuck. Eric tells Dan, who confronts Chuck just as he is about to propose to Blair. Jenny, in tears, leaves with Rufus and Lily. A week later, she says her goodbyes to her family and leaves to finish high school with her mother in Hudson.

=== Season 4 ===
Jenny has been living in Hudson with her mother since May. Blair finds Jenny preparing for an interview with Tim Gunn, and grants her a special day pass. When Chuck steals Jenny's portfolio, she is forced to visit The Empire Hotel, where Blair had forbidden her to go. This results in Blair and Jenny scheming against each other, and Jenny eventually telling Gossip Girl that she lost her virginity to Chuck, not Damien Dalgaard. While Jenny is left feeling victorious, a defeated Blair blames Chuck. Jenny ultimately realises the damage of her return and decides to leave for good, telling Blair and Chuck that their vindictive games against each other will soon destroy them both.

Juliet and Vanessa Skype Jenny, asking for help to take down Serena. Jenny doesn't want to go back to her old tricks but also feels Serena is to blame for everything that happened last year and can never take blame for anything, so she agrees to help with the scheme. But when Serena ends up in the hospital after being drugged by Juliet, Jenny tells Juliet that she is going to come clean with everyone about their scheme. Juliet warns her that she will be going down alone. When Jenny appears at the hospital, Vanessa has already pinned the entire scheme on her; unable to defend herself, she leaves, showing up at Blair's later that night, telling her that Juliet was behind everything and that she and Vanessa were merely accomplices. To prove her story, she hands Blair Juliet's masquerade mask and earns Blair's forgiveness. After confessing to Blair, she says she would love to help her take down Juliet, but she should return to Hudson rather than become involved in another scheme.

=== Season 5 ===
In the premiere episode of season 5, "Yes, Then Zero", Rufus reveals that Jenny moved to London to attend Central Saint Martins.

=== Season 6 ===
In the final episode of the series, it is revealed that Jenny knew that her brother, Dan Humphrey, was the mysterious blogger behind Gossip Girl. She returns to the Upper East Side, appearing in the five-year time jump for her brother's wedding to Serena van der Woodsen. Jenny works as a designer for Blair's fashion empire, implying that they have gotten over their past animosity. Together they create their own clothing line, "J for Waldorf".

== Reception ==
Rumors had circulated during Gossip Girl's first few seasons that Jenny would be given her own spin-off, in line with the character leaving for boarding school just like the novels. News later confirmed that producers did not pick up the spin-off.

Jenny's character further gained prominence during the show's third season. Enid Portugez of the Los Angeles Times praised Jenny's fashionable skills, stating that "Jenny capped off the drama by showing us she's becoming extremely adept at becoming a drug dealer. Her brilliant idea to sew pills into jacket paillettes could have easily won her a Project Runway challenge! Despite the illegality of it all, it was nice to see Jenny put her wit and wiles to use..." Following the dramatic events during the third season finale, Michael Ausiello praised both Leighton Meester and Taylor Momsen's performance. L.J. Gibbs, from TV Fanatic, gave the episode a 3.5 rating star out of 5, and said that he felt that Chuck being shot at the end of the episode was a very "cheap move by the writers", and that the storyline involving Chuck and Jenny having sex was very "unlikely". Mark O. Estes, from TV Overmind, had also praised Taylor Momsen's performance in the episode and said that he "wish that Jenny had of gotten her own spin-off", and questions that if her send-off in this episode means that the show's writers have a "Katherine Heigl" situation on their hands". However, Jenny was included on TV Guide's list of "The Most Loathed TV Characters".

When asked during a Vanity Fair interview if "real" girls could afford the looks from the show, costume designers Eric Daman and Meredith Markworth-Pollack commented on Jenny's style and stated "Of course! Have fun with it like Jenny Humphrey does, and listen to your fashion sense. Go to a vintage or thrift store and have it tailored so it looks like Marc Jacobs [...] but it’s all about individuality."
