= Nate Archibald (Gossip Girl) =

- Gossip Girl character
- Chace Crawford as Nathaniel Archibald
- First appearance: Novel: Gossip Girl; Television: "Pilot" (episode 1.01)
- Last appearance: Novel: I Will Always Love You; Television: "New York, I Love You XOXO" (episode 6.10)
- Created by: Character; Cecily von Ziegesar; Developed for Television; Josh Schwartz; Stephanie Savage
- Portrayed by: Chace Crawford

In-universe information
- Full name: Nathaniel Fitzwilliam Archibald
- Aliases: N Golden Boy
- Nicknames: Nate; Nathaniel (by his grandfather and Chuck); Novels: Natie (by Serena and Blair)
- Gender: Male
- Occupation: Novels: Sailor and lacrosse captain High school student (at St. Jude's; graduated); College student (at Yale; later Deep Springs College); Television: High school student (at St. Jude's; graduated); College student (at Columbia); Editor-in-chief (at The New York Spectator)
- Family: Novels: Captain Archibald (father); Mrs. Archibald (mother); Television: Howard Archibald (father); Anne Archibald (mother; née van der Bilt); William van der Bilt I (maternal grandfather); William van der Bilt II (maternal uncle); William "Tripp" van der Bilt III (first cousin)

Nathaniel Fitzwilliam Archibald is a character in the best selling Gossip Girl book series. He is portrayed by Chace Crawford in the television series of the same name. In the novels, he is considered the primary male character, always being fought over by the two most prominent females, Blair Waldorf and Serena van der Woodsen.

== Novel series ==
Nate Archibald is a lacrosse player at the elite St. Jude's School for Boys. His mother, Anne Archibald, is a French socialite, and his father, Captain Archibald, is a former Navy captain and a wealthy banker. His closest friends are Chuck Bass, Serena van der Woodsen and Blair Waldorf.

He has been dating Blair since middle school. However, Nate is shown to have deep, unresolved feelings for Serena. They have sex during the summer at a wedding. He reveals this to Blair in the first novel after Serena returns, and right before they were supposed to lose their virginity to each other, which causes their first breakup. He gets together with freshman Jenny Humphrey, but later dumps her for Blair for being too clingy. He and Blair have an on-again-off-again relationship throughout most of the novels.

Nate's family resides in a stately townhouse off Park Avenue on the exclusive Upper East Side of Manhattan in New York City, and his mother's French socialite family owns a summer chateau in Nice. He is a fan of sailing like his father, and wished to do that instead of attending Yale with Blair, although he expressed interest in attending Brown University. At the end of the series he sails around the world with a friend of his father's, Captain Charles "Chips" White to avoid getting in between Blair and Serena again. In I Will Aways Love You, on break from Deep Springs College, Nate chooses Blair in part I and then Serena in part II.

== TV series ==
Nathaniel Archibald was born to Captain Howard Archibald, a successful business magnate, and Anne Vanderbilt Archibald, a member of the Vanderbilt family. On the surface, Nate seems to be the perfect "Golden Boy" of the Upper East Side. He is best friends with Chuck Bass, with whom he attends the elite St. Jude's School for Boys. Nate has been with girlfriend Blair Waldorf "since kindergarten". However, he secretly harbors feelings for Blair's best friend, Serena van der Woodsen. They shared a sordid one night stand before the show began, which caused her departure to boarding school. Nate's feelings for Blair are complicated by his ongoing infatuation with Serena and his parents' determination to keep him on a certain path. He later goes on to attend Columbia University.

=== In other media ===
Nate is the subject of the song 'Nate Will Not Return' by British post-punk band The Fall on their 2011 album Ersatz GB.
