= Jonathan Karp =

American dramatist (born 1964)

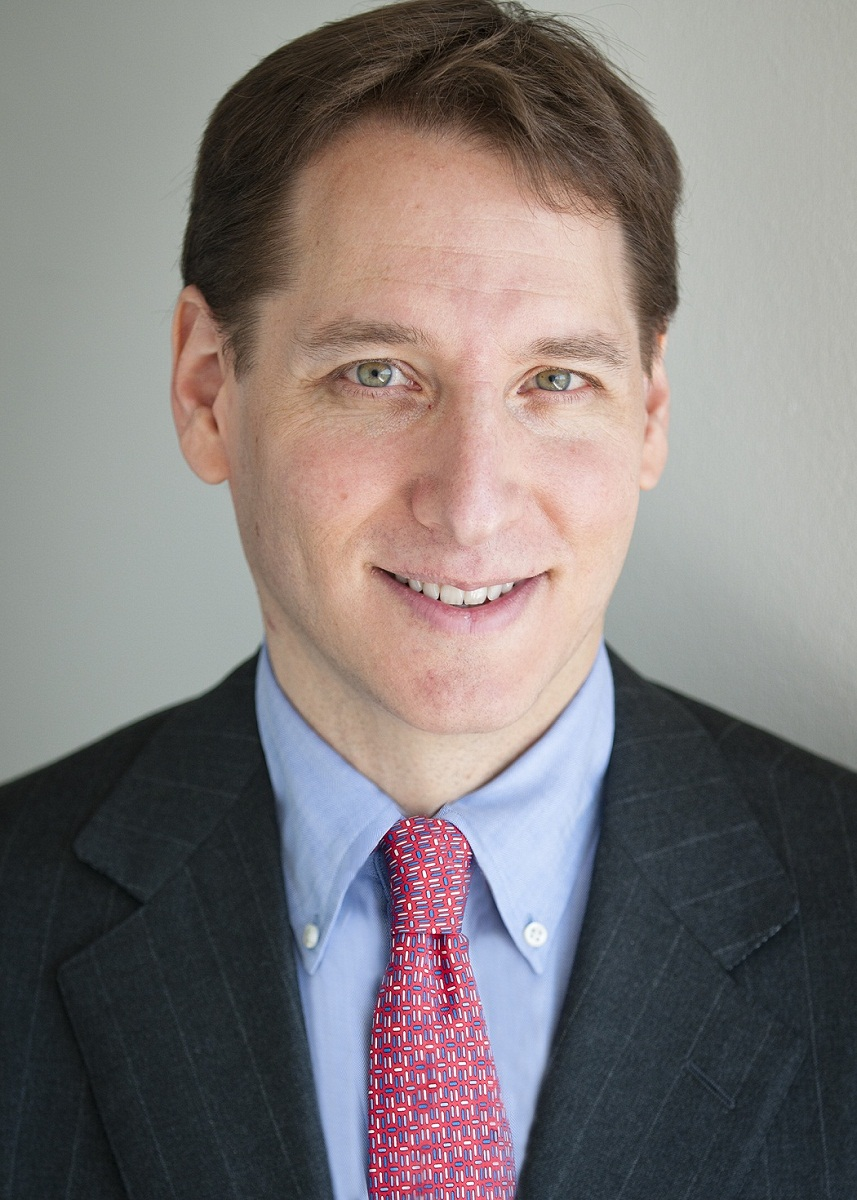
- Born: April 2, 1964; New Jersey, USA
- Citizenship: United States
- Education: Brown University
- Employer: Simon & Schuster

Jonathan Karp (born April 2, 1964) is an American book editor, publisher, and writer. He was the publisher, president, and chief executive of Simon & Schuster, where he led the company's flagship division. Karp also founded Twelve, an imprint at the Hachette Book Group, and was the editor-in-chief of Random House.

== Early life and education ==
Karp was born to a Jewish family and raised in the Short Hills section of Millburn, New Jersey. His mother worked as a schoolteacher and his father was chairman and chief executive officer at a bank. Karp graduated from Brown University in 1986, where he majored in American civilization and served as president and editor of the student publication, The Brown Daily Herald. He wrote his master's thesis on Herman Wouk's novels.

== Career ==
Karp wrote for The Washington Post in the mid-1980s, then worked as a reporter for The Providence Journal and the Miami Herald. He then relocated to New York City to pursue his interests in books and theater.

Karp joined Random House in 1989 as an editorial assistant, and by 2000 he was a vice president and senior editor. In July 2000, he was promoted to the role of publisher of '@Random', the company's e-book branch, and he eventually became editor-in-chief of Random House. He worked for Random House for 16 years, with one interruption; in 2000, he joined producer Scott Rudin's office in New York (Scott Rudin Productions) as vice president of development. He returned to Bertelsmann several weeks later.

Karp then served as publisher and editor-in-chief of Twelve, an imprint he established within the Hachette Book Group in 2005, which publishes one book per month. Fifteen of Twelve's first thirty books appeared on The New York Times Best Seller list.

In 2010, Karp left Hachette to become Simon & Schuster's publisher. He was later named president of the flagship division. On 29 May 2020, he became the CEO of Simon & Schuster. Karp was included in Publishers Weekly's 2022 list of 25 "book business change makers", or "seriously consequential individuals whose mark on the industry is indelible". In his role as chief executive, Karp testified in a 2022 antitrust trial filed by the Department of Justice to prevent Penguin Random House from acquiring Simon & Schuster.

In 2022, Simon & Schuster sold 900 autographed copies of Bob Dylan’s book of essays The Philosophy of Modern Song. Accompanying each $600 book was a letter of authenticity signed by Karp indicating that the books had been hand signed by Dylan. According to a New York Times article, when the books arrived, readers immediately noticed that the autographs appeared to have been generated by an autopen. Simon & Schuster initially denounced the "online rumors", but intense pressure led the publishing house to send out an "acknowledgment" that the autograph had been rendered "in a penned replica form". Buyers were then given a refund. Karp and Simon & Schuster declined further comment. Dylan later said "his decision to digitally sign" the books was an "error in judgment", according to the Los Angeles Times.

Karp was John McCain's longtime editor; they collaborated with Mark Salter on Faith of My Fathers (1999), Worth the Fighting For (2002), Why Courage Matters (2004), and The Restless Wave (2018).

In 2020, Alexandra Alter of The New York Times wrote, "As a publisher who has worked with both conservative and liberal public figures, Mr. Karp has developed a reputation for knowing which political books will work commercially and how to market them." In 2021, he turned down a petition signed by approximately 200 staff members opposing Simon & Schuster's decision to publish a memoir by Mike Pence. According to The Wall Street Journal, some staff said the deal "would be a betrayal of the company's promises to oppose bigotry and make minority employees feel safe", but Karp insisted Simon & Schuster is "committed to publishing a broad range of views".

In August 2025, Karp stepped down from his role as CEO and launched the imprint Simon Six.

=== Theater and television ===
Karp met composer Seth Weinstein during their two-year apprenticeship at the BMI Lehman Engel Musical Theatre Workshop, in Manhattan in 1996. The duo wrote The Kugelmass Affair, which is based on a short story by Woody Allen.

In 2000, Karp co-directed Big Kiss: An Evening of Humiliating Audition Stories with Alford, who wrote Big Kiss: One Actor's Desperate Attempt to Claw His Way to the Top. The show featured Alford and other actors performing monologues they wrote about their most embarrassing audition experiences.

Karp's and Weinstein's second musical, Heart Throb, premiered at the Producers Club in 2001. The duo later collaborated on How to Save the World and Find True Love in 90 Minutes, with Karp writing the book and lyrics. The Off-Broadway musical comedy, about a United Nations tour guide who realizes his ability to read minds after getting hit in the head by a melon, was first presented as I Know What You're Thinking in September 2000 at the New York International Fringe Festival and later ran at the arts complex New World Stages.

In May 2011, Karp made a cameo appearance in the finale of Gossip Girl's fourth season ("The Wrong Goodbye"), in which he negotiates a manuscript deal with one of the show's main characters. He later appeared on the season five episodes "The Jewel of Denial" (October 10, 2011) and "Father and the Bride" (January 23, 2012).

== Bibliography ==
- Karp, Jonathan (2017). "The alchemy of acquisitions: twelve rules for trade editors". In Ginna, Peter (ed.). What editors do : the art, craft, and business of book editing. Chicago: University of Chicago Press.

== See also ==
- List of Brown University people
