= Living History (book) =

2003 memoir by Hillary Clinton

- Cover
- Author: Hillary Rodham Clinton
- Language: English
- Publisher: Simon & Schuster
- Publication date: June 9, 2003
- Publication place: United States
- Media type: Print (hardcover and paperback)
- Pages: 562
- ISBN: 0743222245
- OCLC: 52343577
- Dewey Decimal: 973.929/092 B 22
- LC Class: E887.C55 A3 2003b

Living History is a 2003 memoir by Hillary Clinton. It was written when she was a sitting U.S. senator from New York.

== Background and writing ==
In December 2000, Simon & Schuster agreed to pay Clinton a reported $8 million advance for what became Living History—a near-record figure to an author for an advance at that time. Critics charged that the book deal, coming soon after her election to the U.S. Senate, but before being sworn into office, was not in adherence to the ethical standards required for members of the U.S. Senate. However, in February 2001, the Senate Ethics Committee gave Clinton approval for the deal.

Clinton reportedly used three ghostwriters for Living History: veteran ghostwriter Maryanne Vollers, speechwriter Lissa Muscatine, and researcher Ruby Shamir. Muscatine later related how the three would meet at Clinton's house early in the morning before she left for the Capitol building, do a day's worth of writing, and then meet again after midnight at Clinton's for the senator to edit the work until three o'clock in the morning. Clinton's acknowledgment section stated: "This book may not have taken a village to write, but it certainly took a superb team ... The smartest decision I made was to ask Lissa Muscatine, Maryanne Vollers, and Ruby Shamir to spend two years of their lives working with me. Lissa [was] responsible for many of the words in my speeches as First Lady and in this book ... Maryanne [has] the rare gift of understanding how to help another's voice emerge ... Ruby [had the job of] amassing, reviewing and synthesizing millions of words written about me." However, the three women did not receive co-writing credit on the book's cover. This is not unusual for political autobiographies, but in the same period ghostwriters for some other political figures were given co-writing credit, as for instance fellow Senator John Edwards gave to writer John Auchard on his book Four Trials and fellow Senator John McCain gave to administrative assistant Mark Salter on his books Faith of My Fathers, Worth the Fighting For, Why Courage Matters, and Character Is Destiny.

== Critical and commercial reception ==
Reviews of Living History were mixed, with a typical evaluation commending the chapters describing her early life, decrying the overly lengthy later treatments of relatively mundane events as First Lady, and criticizing the lack of candor in the sections covering controversial episodes, including those surrounding her husband and the Lewinsky scandal. Observers later noted the difference in how Clinton portrayed her upbringing with Carl Bernstein's profile of Clinton's father Hugh Rodham in his 2007 book A Woman in Charge. Bernstein also wrote in A Woman in Charge, "It is an understatement by now that [Clinton] has been known to apprehend truths about herself and the events of her life that others do not exactly share. Living History is an example of that."

The book sold more than one million copies in the first month following publication; its sales during its first week of availability set a record for a non-fiction book. The success of the book surprised many in the publishing industry, who thought Simon & Schuster had overpaid for the work. It also surprised pundits who had doubted her selling power, including CNN's Tucker Carlson, who had said, "If they sell a million copies of this book, I'll eat my shoes and my tie. I will." (Once past the million mark, Clinton appeared on Carlson's show to present him with a shoe-shaped chocolate cake.) Clinton's energetic promotion of the book, which included signing an estimated 20,000 copies (causing her to require ice and wrist support treatments), was credited for part of the success. By 2007, she had earned over $10 million from the book.

== Audio records ==
Clinton's audio recording of Living History earned her a Grammy nomination in the Best Spoken Word Album category in 2003.

== Paperback edition ==
A paperback edition was released in April 2004 with an afterword in which Clinton described her experiences in doing book signing events.
