= Public image of John McCain =

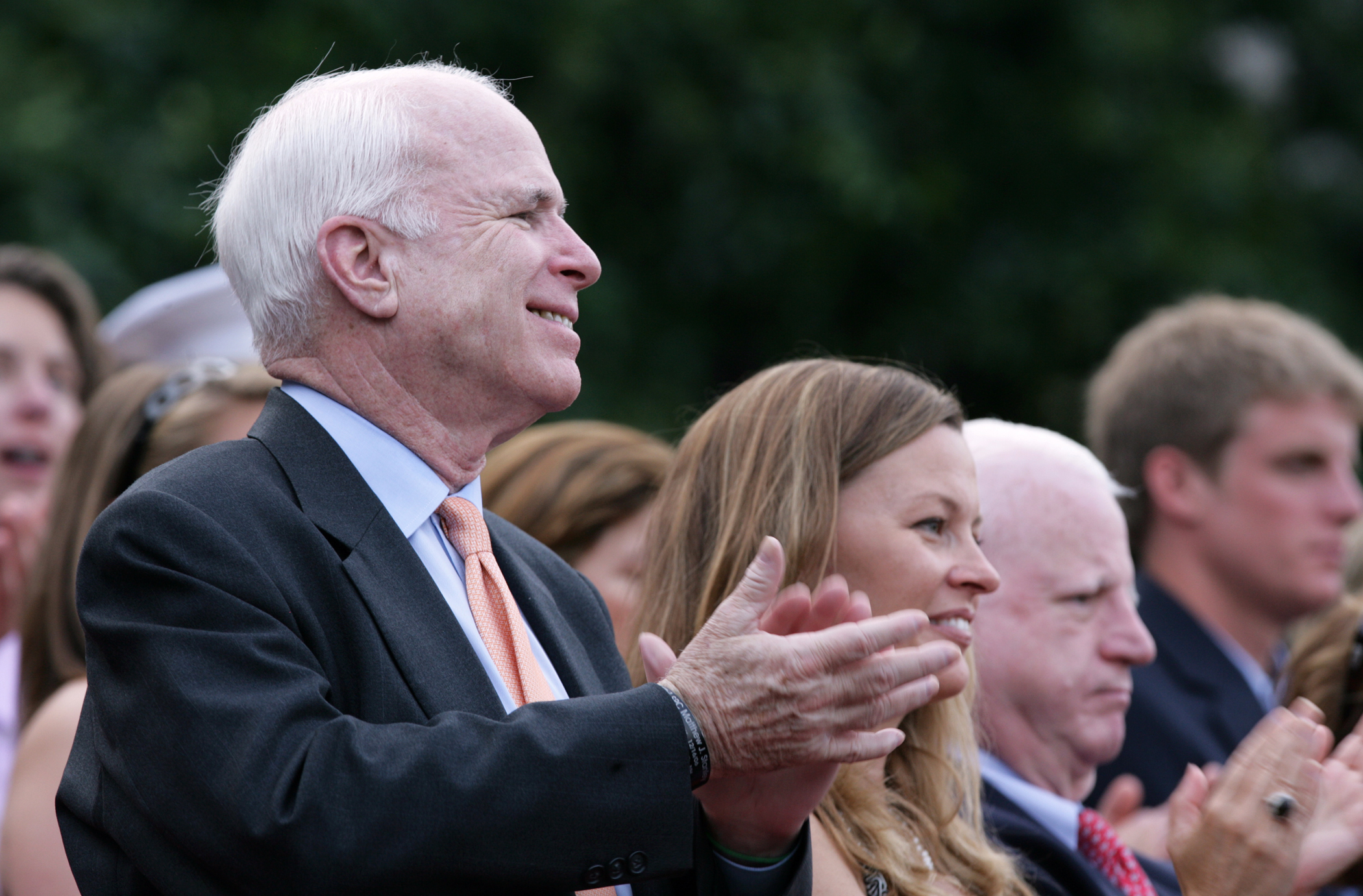
McCain in August 2009

Senator John McCain's personal character has dominated the image and perception of him. His family's military heritage, his rebellious nature as a youth, his endurance over his treatment as a prisoner of war, his resulting physical limitations, his political persona, his well-known temper, his admitted propensity for controversial or ill-advised remarks, and his devotion to maintaining his large blended family have all defined his place in the American political world more than any ideological or partisan framing (although the latter became more prominent beginning in 2008 when he was the Republican nominee for president).

McCain embraced and encouraged a popular perception of him as a "maverick" willing to buck partisan trends and stand on his own convictions. Numerous political analysts have contended that the descriptor either mischaracterizes or oversimplifies McCain's political behavior and motivations. During his 2008 campaign and the subsequent eight years of the Obama presidency, several analysts and commentators offered criticisms that McCain had drifted further from embodying the "maverick" image he had previously cultivated for himself.

Due to animus between McCain and President Donald Trump (a fellow Republican), partisan attitudes and favorability towards McCain shifted in his last years of life, particularly after McCain's decisive vote against Senate passage of the AHCA (a Trump and Republican-backed bill that would have enacted "skinny repeal" of the Affordable Care Act without passing a substitution to the ACA's provisions). By the time of his death, McCain was viewed more positively by Democrats and independents than by Republicans. In the leadup to the 2020 election (the first presidential election held after McCain's death, in which Trump was seeking re-election), Democratic nominee Joe Biden prominently evoked his cross-party friendship with McCain. McCain's widow, Cindy, endorsed Biden and filmed a television advertisement that his campaign aired in McCain's home state of Arizona. Biden won Arizona in his successful campaign against Trump, with the evoked memory of John McCain being cited as a factor in that rare Democratic presidential success in Arizona.

== Military experiences ==
McCain's experiences as a POW have formed the basis for some of his public and political image. University of Richmond political scientist John Karaagac states that, "The military holds a special place in American society and in American democracy. In both war and peace, the military becomes the archetype of democratic values and aspirations... The competing tension of intense institutional loyalty on one hand and guardian of the republic on the other [leads to a situation where] the military view of politics is bound to be ambivalent." Karaagac then sees McCain as a focal point of this tension and ambivalence. In part, this is due to McCain's family history: public service is idealized in military tradition, whereas politics is deprecated, and this was the tradition in McCain's family as well. Yet McCain's father also served as a Congressional liaison for a while, and was able to be politically effective without seeming overtly so; part of McCain's youth was spent seeing a steady stream of powerful politicians entertained at his family's house. When McCain first began his Senate liaison work, he held congressional leaders in poor regard, due to their actions during and after the Vietnam War. But once he began working with them closely, he found a number of them he admired: "They were statesmen, and although some of them had never served in uniform, I came to appreciate that most were patriots of the first order."

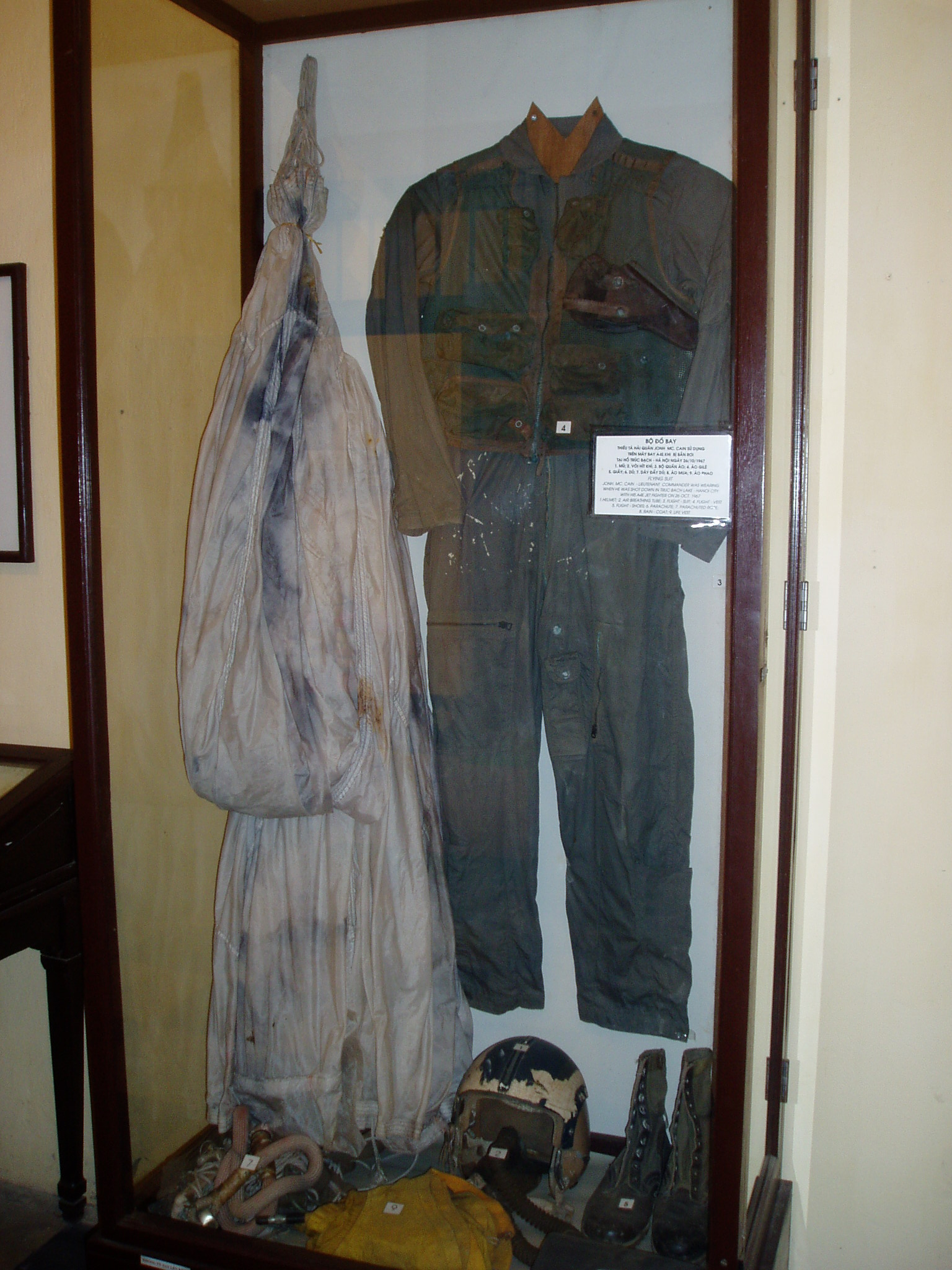
McCain's flight suit and parachute, on display in the North Vietnamese museum at the site of the "Hanoi Hilton" Hoa Lo Prison. McCain's experiences as a POW have formed the basis for some of his political image.

American Prospect editor Michael Tomasky sees McCain's POW experience as being uniquely suited for his country's perceptions of the Vietnam War: "It was by suffering in a cell, serving as a kind of metaphor for American suffering in a war most Americans gave up on early in his confinement, but at the same time holding fast to principle under the most unimaginable circumstances, thereby redeeming some notion of American honor in a dishonorable situation, that McCain became an American hero." This assessment is echoed by The Washington Post columnist Charles Krauthammer, who says that "McCain's is not the heroism of conquest or even rescue, but of endurance, and, even more important, endurance for principle. ... [his] suffering has become in the public imagination a kind of expiation for the war itself. It explains why even people so ideologically distant from him find his experience so moving and his appeal so powerful." The New Republic writer David Grann also concurs in this assessment of McCain's real heroism, but emphasizes that during the 1990s the U.S. national media often overlooked not only political and ideological beliefs of McCain's contrary to theirs, but biographical blemishes as well, in a revival of an old American tradition of hero-building that goes back to Parson Weems. Journalist Andrew Ferguson describes instances where journalists who grew up in the Vietnam era have felt guilt for not having served themselves, and once in contact with McCain have viewed and written favorably about him as a result; the same pattern has been observed by Tomasky and by author David Brock. Longtime Washington journalist Al Hunt states that "The hero is indispensable to the McCain persona" and sees the courage McCain showed as a prisoner of war directly linked to the courage required to take on "the link between money and politics [that] is pervasive throughout American history." Writer Michael Lewis views McCain's political "nerve [as] far more interesting than bravery in combat. It was the nerve of a man engaged in an experiment of behaving like a human being when everyone around him was playing this strange, artificial game."

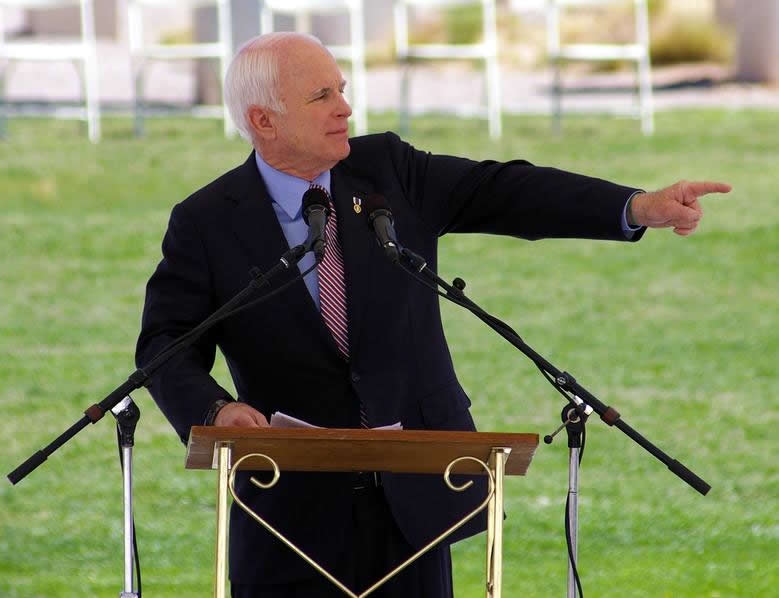
McCain on Memorial Day, 2008. He is wearing a Purple Heart. His range of arm motion is limited as the result of his wounds in Vietnam.

McCain was a lifelong gambler, from his early military days of playing poker, craps, and roulette and running a friendly Bachelor Officer Quarters gambling den while off-duty in Florida and Texas, to traveling periodically to Las Vegas for weekend-long betting marathons while senator. McCain had a history, beginning with his military career, of appealing to lucky charms and superstitions to gain fortune. While serving in Vietnam, he demanded that his parachute rigger clean his visor before each flight. On his 2000 presidential campaign, he carried a lucky compass, feather, shoes, pen, penny and, at times, a rock. An incident when McCain misplaced his feather caused a brief panic in the campaign. The night before the 2008 New Hampshire primary he slept on the same side of the bed in the same hotel room he had stayed in before his win there in 2000, and after winning carried some of his talismans forward into the following Michigan primary supplemented by others. His superstitions are extended to others; to those afraid of flying or experiencing a bumpy flight, he says, "You don't need to worry. I've crashed four fighter jets, and I'm not going to die in a plane crash. You're safe with me."

McCain's war wounds left him incapable of raising his arms above his head; he was unable to attend to his own hair and he sometimes required assistance in dressing, tasks performed by nearby aides. His former communications director has said, "You comb someone's hair once, and you never forget it." McCain was treated for recurrent skin cancer, including melanoma, in 1993, 2000, and 2002; one of the resulting operations left a noticeable mark on the left side of his face. These medical conditions, combined with his advancing years, led him to repeatedly use a self-deprecating remark during his 2008 presidential campaigning: "I am older than dirt and have more scars than Frankenstein."

== Political character and public response ==
=== Maverick image ===
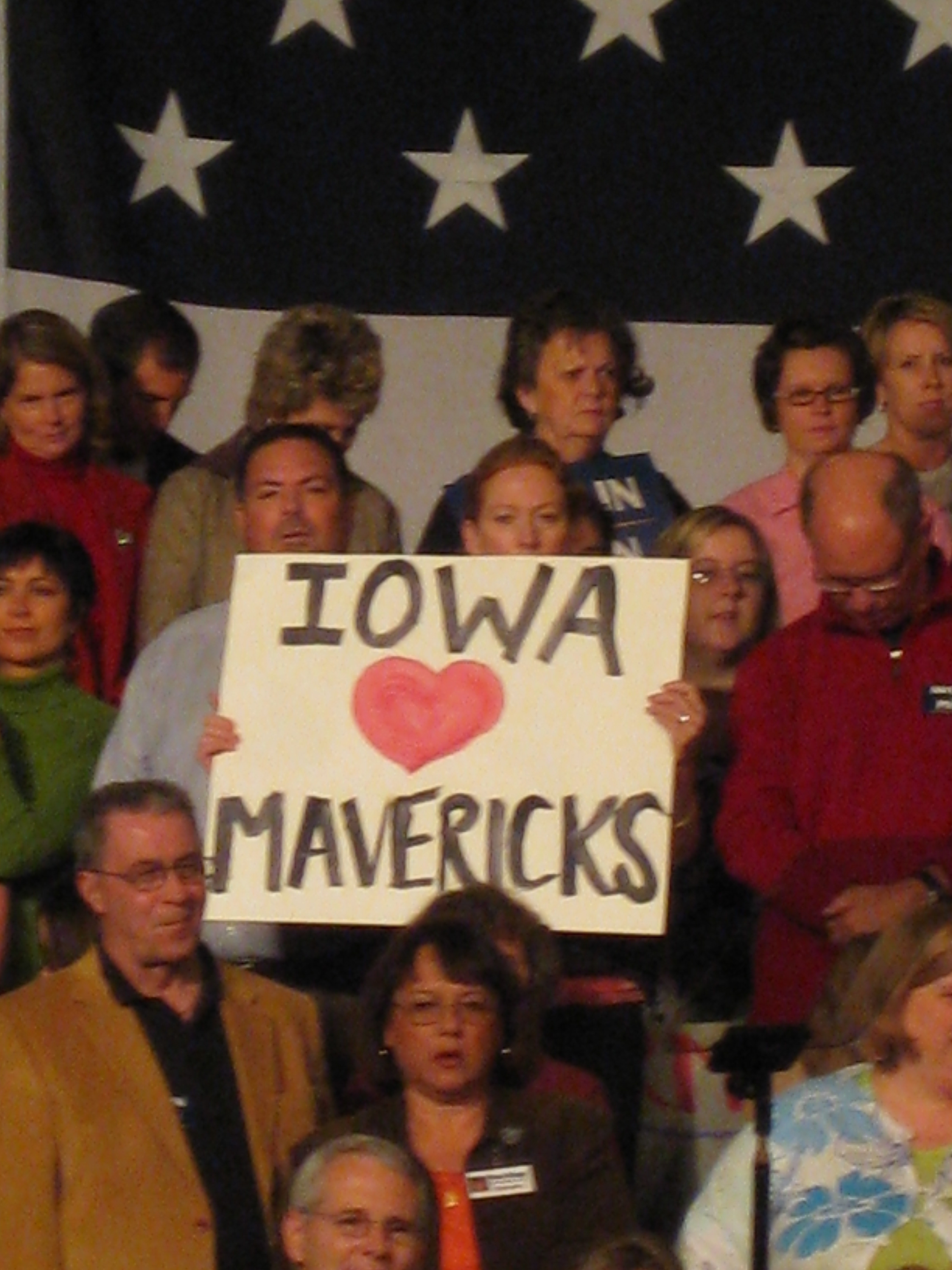
A supporter of McCain's 2008 presidential campaign holding a sign invoking the "maverick" descriptor embraced by McCain

McCain was frequently described as a "maverick". He, in part, cultivated this image himself and promoted the use of this descriptor to his political advantage. He especially promoted this label during his campaign in the general election of the 2008 presidential race.

After many years of observing McCain, The New York Times columnist David Brooks wrote in late-2007 that, "there is nobody in politics remotely like him," making reference to his energy and dynamism, his rebelliousness and desire to battle powerful political forces, his willingness to endlessly and truthfully talk with reporters, and his being "driven by an ancient sense of honor." Brooks does not see McCain without political fault, but explains that, "There have been occasions when McCain compromised his principles for political gain, but he was so bad at it that it always backfired." Vanity Fair national editor Todd Purdum sees McCain's efforts in the years leading up to the 2008 election as "trying to make the maverick, freethinking impulses that first made him into a political star somehow compatible with the suck-it-up adherence to the orthodoxies required of a Republican presidential front-runner" and compares it to squaring the circle: "McCain needs to square that circle, and the hell of it is, he just can't." The New Republic senior editor Jonathan Chait thinks that McCain did not do this, but echoed Brooks by saying, "[McCain's] demagoguery comes with an awkward forced smile, which doesn't make it more forgivable but does make it less irritating." Karaagac, though, sees that McCain "as Senator, ... understands how to play the game of politics by knowing when to appear above the fracas."

McCain wrote in his 2002 biography Worth the Fighting For, "I have my reputation ... I'm an independent-minded, well-intentioned public servant to some. And to others, I'm a self-styled, self-righteous, maverick pain in the ass." And while McCain recognizes that deference, finesse, patience, and agility are qualities that are often associated with successful politicians, "God has given me heart enough for my ambitions, but too little forbearance to pursue them by routes other than a straight line." Newsweek editor Jon Meacham observed that, "There is a kind of egotism in McCain—he loves attention, always has, and takes glee in confounding the expectations of the institutions of which he is a part." City University of New York political science professor Stanley A. Renshon found that trait theory does not adequately explain McCain's behavior as a political figure, and that McCain's interior psychology includes a variety of aspects that defy simple analysis in terms of how he might perform in higher leadership roles.

=== Political character before 2008 campaign ===
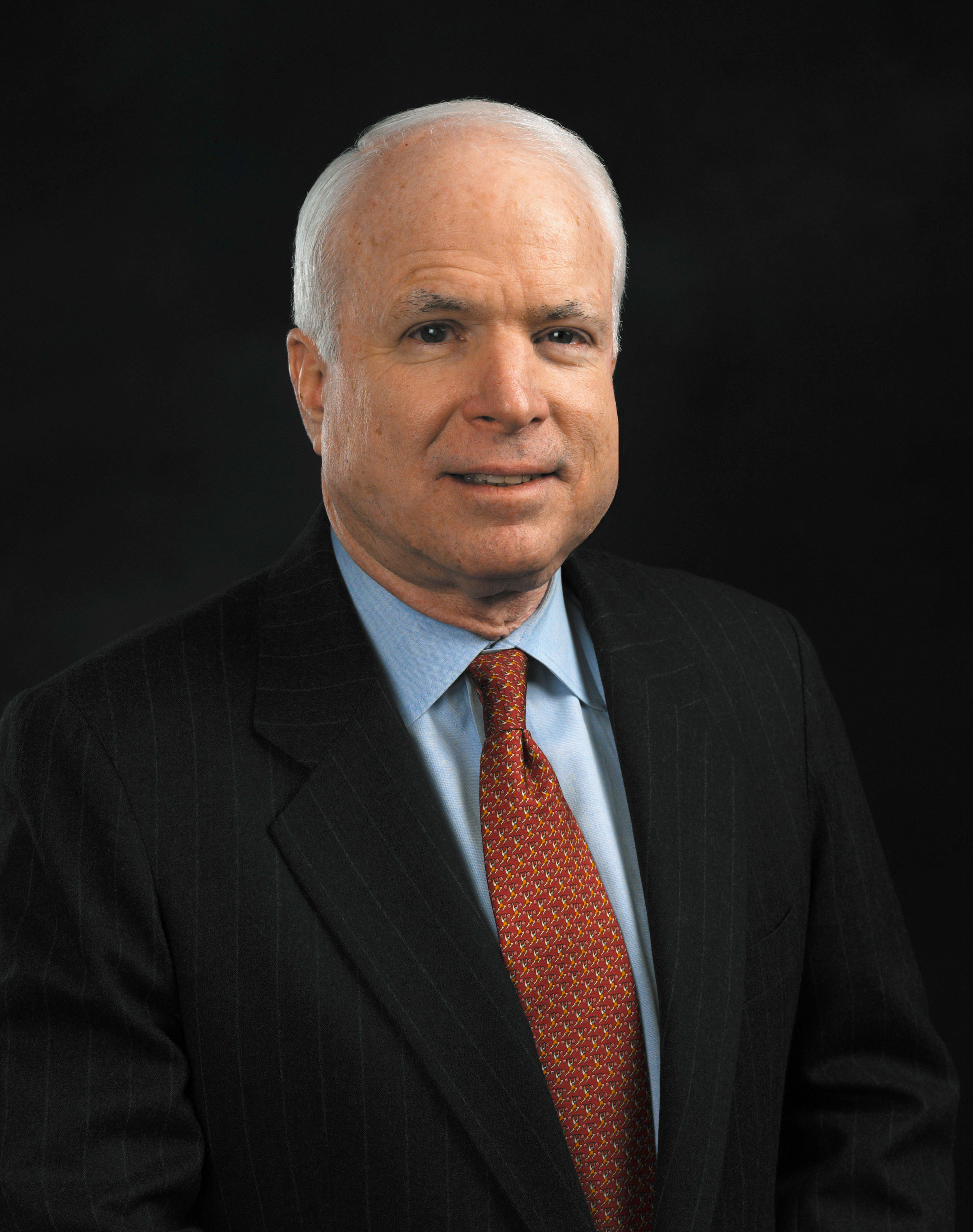
Congressional portrait.

McCain's own emphasis on personal character in his appeal to voters was revealed in a University of Missouri study of political discourse in the 2000 Republican primary campaign, which showed McCain using fewer policy, and more character, utterances than any other candidate. Another study of the campaign, by University of North Florida communications professor John Parmelee, performed a framing theory analysis of a McCain campaign videocassette sent to voters; it found the video's narrative sought to connect values from McCain's personal life and war record to his political courage and then his political platform. Unlike rival George W. Bush's campaign videocassette, McCain's did not shy away from negative aspects of his personal history, but instead sought to frame his divorce as a chapter in his character-building POW experience. McCain's appeal has usually not been based on party identification: University of California, San Diego political science professor Gary Jacobson's 2006 study of partisan polarization found that in a state-by-state survey of job approval ratings of the state's senators, McCain had the seventh-smallest partisan difference of any senator, with a 2.6 percentage point difference in approval between Arizona's Republicans and Democrats. Likewise, an April 2008 Gallup poll found that the public perception of him as a war hero was not strongly weighted by party identification (unlike the case in 2004 for Democratic presidential nominee John Kerry). While McCain's Gallup poll favorability ratings were beaten down during the course of the 2008 U.S. presidential election, they rebounded to previous levels within days of his defeat.

Nor has conventional ideology defined him: Arizona Republic columnist and RealClearPolitics contributor Robert Robb, using a formulation devised by William F. Buckley Jr., describes McCain as "conservative" but not "a conservative", meaning that while McCain usually tends towards conservative positions, he is not "anchored by the philosophical tenets of modern American conservatism." New Yorker writer George Packer says of McCain, "He doesn't present himself as a conservative leader; he is simply a leader." Reason and Los Angeles Times writer Matt Welch, author of McCain: The Myth of a Maverick, sees political pundits as projecting their own ideological fantasies upon McCain, with the result that McCain's "maverick" persona shields his actual goals for the nation and national culture. McCain called himself "a Teddy Roosevelt conservative", and indeed Welch sees Theodore Roosevelt as the main governmental role model for McCain, and writes that McCain believes in effectively statist solutions that will facilitate the notion "that Americans 'were meant to transform history' and that sublimating the individual in the service of that 'common national cause' is the wellspring of honor and purpose."

McCain, like many other politicians, would often fall short of professed ideals, publicly confess to his shortcomings, and then move past such shortfalls. University of Southern California Unruh Institute of Politics Director Dan Schnur, a former McCain campaign spokesperson, called McCain "the best apologizer in politics".

An Arizona Republic analysis of Senate votes from 1999 to 2008 found that McCain broke with his party in about a quarter of the close votes where his stance could make a difference, but almost never in the years he was running for president. However, McCain's Senate stances on signature issues of campaign finance reform in 1999 and comprehensive immigration reform in 2007, while not resulting in very close Senate votes, significantly damaged his presidential prospects in both years.

=== Shift in political image during 2008 campaign ===
By the time of the 2008 general election season, the nature of some of the McCain campaign's tactics had tipped the balance of past respect for some observers. The Washington Post columnist and past McCain admirer Richard Cohen said that "the John McCain of old is unrecognizable. He has become the sort of politician he once despised." Writer Michael Kinsley noted falsehoods stated by the McCain campaign and pondered whether it will be "necessary to wait for one of McCain's conveniently delayed conversions to righteousness."

=== Political image during the Obama administration ===
The perceived shift in McCain's political character during the 2008 election continued during the Obama administration, particularly during McCain's 2010 senate reelection campaign. As McCain shed his past contraorthodox positions and even explicitly repudiated his famous "maverick" label, Alexander Burns and Martin Jonathan of Politico opined that, "by seeming to do anything to win reelection McCain has torched one of the most famous brands in modern American politics." Fox News echoed this sentiment by opining that "McCain abandoned his maverick label and cast aside one of the most powerful brands in American politics as he fought to reassure conservatives they could trust him."

The perceived change in McCain's political caused writers to reassess and question their past conclusions about McCain. David Margolick, writing for Newsweek magazine, wondered: "His dramatic shifts raise several questions: How much of his maverick persona over the years has been real and how much simply tactical? Is he in the midst of some struggle for his soul, or is this evolution simply the latest example, dating back to his days at the Hanoi Hilton, of McCain doing whatever it takes to survive? Is the anger people sense in him anger at Obama, or the American electorate, or fate, or himself?" James Fallows of The Atlantic saw McCain as going against the usual trend of public figures becoming more broad-minded as they get older and concluded, "John McCain seems intentionally to be shrinking his audience, his base, and his standing in history. It's unnecessary, and it is sad." Writer Niall O'Dowd wrote that McCain had been "a remarkable man, true to his own vision of where true north was on his compass," but then, "something happened ... In his place is this crotchety naysayer who has lost all track of his better self and his better angels." Todd Purdum, whose long, largely favorable treatment of McCain in an early 2007 issue of Vanity Fair had been titled "Prisoner of Conscience", wrote a far more bitter piece for the same publication in late 2010 entitled "The Man Who Never Was".

Believing that McCain had changed, some political writers sought explanations for actions that appeared contrary to their previous understanding of his nature. Explanations varied. Two explanations floated were that McCain had changed as a calculation to protect his political survival, or, similarly, that he had been motivated by calculations of political expediency. The departure of key staffer Mark Salter was cited as a potential factor in changes to McCain's political behavior. Other explanations considered included personal antipathy towards President Obama and a resentment of Obama's election victory over him. The New York Times columnist Gail Collins once jested that, "The old John McCain," had been, "kidnapped by space aliens and reprogrammed." In 2018, Liam Stack retrospectively observed in The New York Times that after the 2008 election, "Tea party anger and opposition to President Obama moved the Republican Party to the right, and after 2008 Mr. McCain moved with it. His positions on issues like border security and climate change hardened in the face of a right-wing primary challenger."

Contrarily, there were some political writers who argued that McCain actually could be viewed as remaining consistent if you applied a different understanding of what McCain's guiding principles were. Matt Welch acknowledged that McCain had made a series of "crude reversals" in his political positions, but also extrapolated upon his previous analysis of McCain that some of the shifts were actually not inconsistent with McCain's past motivating causes. He argued that some of the changes in positions that McCain had made could actually be explained as being due to McCain's generational military heritage and that, "McCain's core, almost genetic, principle in governance and life is that the United States should remain the unchallenged military superpower keeping the world safe for democracy and commerce." The Washington Post columnist Ezra Klein wrote that McCain's career is better explained by looking at electoral opportunities and his personal resentments at the time than by political or policy positions. Purdum built on both these themes and wrote that McCain's political self was connected to his past as a warrior, writing,

McCain has always lived for the fight, and he has defined himself most clearly in opposition to an enemy, whether that enemy was the rule-bound leadership of the United States Naval Academy, his North Vietnamese captors, the hometown Arizona press corps that never much liked him, his Republican congressional colleagues, the Reverend Jerry Falwell, George W. Bush, Donald Rumsfeld, Barack Obama, or J. D. Hayworth. He has always been more of an existential politician than a consequential one, in the sense that his influence has derived not from steady, unswerving pursuit of philosophical goals or legislative achievements but from the series of unpredictable—and sometimes spectacular—fights he has chosen to pick.

During 2013, several Congressional negotiations showed that McCain now had improved his relations with the Obama administration, including with President Obama himself, as well as with Democratic Senate Majority Leader Harry Reid, and that he had become the leader of a power center in the Senate for cutting deals in an otherwise bitterly partisan environment. These negotiations also led some observers to conclude that the "maverick" McCain had returned. By the end of 2013, journalist Mark Leibovich sought to sum up the John McCain of the moment, and wrote,

Many of us become walking self-caricatures at a certain point, and politicians can be particularly vulnerable, especially those who have maneuvered their very public lives as conspicuously as McCain. They tell and retell the same stories; things get musty. They engage in a lot of self-mythologizing, and no one in Washington has been the subject and the perpetrator of more mythmaking than McCain: the maverick, the former maverick, the curmudgeon, the bridge builder, the war hero bent on transcending the call of self-interest to serve a cause greater than himself, the sore loser, old bull, last lion, loose cannon, happy warrior, elder statesman, lion in winter ... you lose track of which McCain cliché is operational at a given moment.

In 2018, Liam Stack retrospectively wrote in The New York Times that, some time after winning reelection in 2010, McCain, "returned to bipartisanship," at a time when, "the political environment became more polarized." Stack noted that McCain, "worked with a bipartisan group of senators, known as the Gang of Eight, in a failed push for immigration reform", and also noted that McCain did not support using the threat of a government shutdown as a means for Republican to push for changes the Patient Protection and Affordable Care Act.

=== Political image during the Trump administration ===
McCain had a publicly bad relationship with Donald Trump. Trump had a long history of criticizing McCain. On January 11, 2000, when Trump was making his 2000 presidential campaign, he remarked on McCain's period as a prisoner of war, saying, "he was captured. Does being captured make you a hero? I don’t know. I’m not sure." During his 2016 campaign, on July 18, 2015, Trump again made remarks that demeaned McCain's period as a prisoner of war, calling McCain a "loser" and saying, "he’s not a war hero. He’s a war hero because he was captured. I like people that weren’t captured".

During the Trump administration, McCain challenged his own party on a number of issues. McCain also cast the deciding vote against the American Health Care Act of 2017 (also known as the "skinny repeal" of the Patient Protection and Affordable Care Act), announcing his opposition to the bill with a dramatic thumbs-down during the Senate floor vote on it. With that being said, McCain still voted in line with Trump 83% of the time (including voting to confirm Betsy DeVos, Rex Tillerson, Scott Pruitt, Ben Carson, and Jeff Sessions).

In his final memoir (The Restless Wave, published in 2018 after his terminal cancer diagnosis), McCain provided a retrospective about-face on the Iraq War. McCain wrote that the war had a mistake, writing that it, "can’t be judged as anything other than a mistake, a very serious one, and I have to accept my share of the blame for it."

By the end of Trump's first year in office, polls showed that McCain had become significantly more popular among Democrats than he was among Republicans and independents.

== Posthumous political image ==
Polling conducted shortly after McCain's death showed him to have greater approval among liberals and moderates than he did among conservatives, and greater approval among those who voted for Democrat Hillary Clinton in 2016 than had among those who had voted for Republican Donald Trump.

Plans that McCain made in his waning months for his funeral reflected his divide with Trump. McCain had asked that incumbent president Trump not be in attendance at his funeral. Instead, he had asked former presidents George W. Bush and Barack Obama (who had respectively defeated McCain for president in the 2000 Republican primary and the 2008 general election) to deliver eulogies at his funeral, both of whom obliged. McCain also asked Joe Biden (a longtime friend of McCain's who had served as Obama's vice president) to McCain, in planning his funeral before his death, to deliver a eulogy and to serve as a pallbearer, a request which Biden agreed to fulfill. McCain's family asked his 2008 running mate Sarah Palin not to attend the funeral. In his final memoir (The Restless Wave, published earlier in 2018), McCain had made public that he regretted having selected her as his running mate, wishing he had instead followed through on his original intention of running a unity ticket with (independent Democrat) Joe Lieberman.

=== Evocation during 2020 elections ===
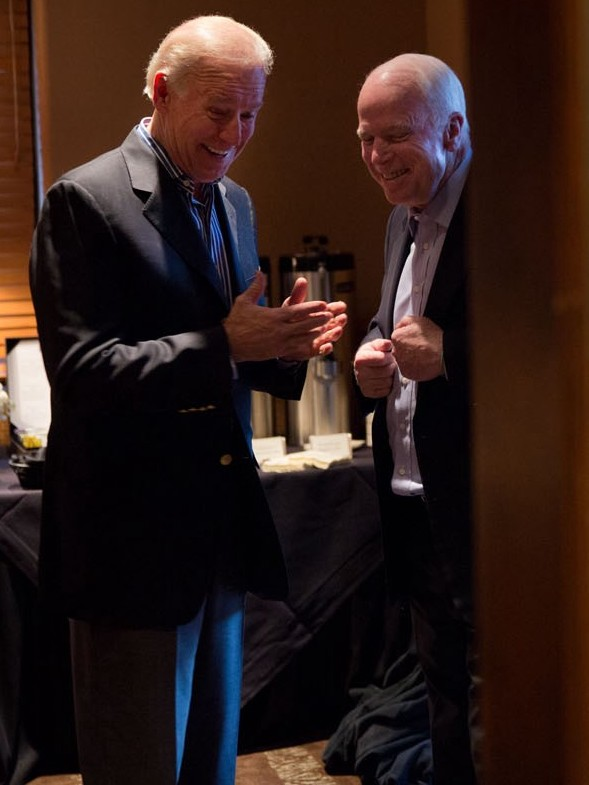
McCain and Joe Biden at a McCain Institute event in 2013

In the 2020 United States presidential election, Joe Biden was the Democratic Party nominee for president of the United States, running against Trump. McCain had been close friends with Biden. Their friendship began in the 1970s, when Biden was a new member of the U.S. Senate and McCain was working as the Navy’s liaison officer to the Senate. They would become colleagues when McCain joined the Senate. The two, of opposing parties, were known to sharply disagree on many issues, but maintained their friendship. In 2008, Biden was elected vice president on the Obama-Biden ticket, which defeated the McCain-Palin ticket. Biden had (at McCain's request) delivered a eulogy and served as a pallbearer at McCain's funeral.

In 2020, the story of Biden's friendship with McCain was promoted by the Biden campaign. During the 2020 Democratic National Convention in August 2020, a video segment was shown in which McCain's widow Cindy spoke of Biden's friendship with her late husband. On September 22, Cindy McCain gave her full endorsement to Biden. Cindy McCain would, days later, also join the team planning Biden's potential presidential transition. In October 2020, the Biden campaign began running video advertisements in the state of Arizona which featured Cindy McCain likening Biden to her husband, declaring Biden to be a leader who will, "always fight for the American people, just like John did".

In addition to Cindy McCain's support for Biden, a number of ex-staffers of McCain's publicly threw their support behind Biden. Steve Schmidt, senior campaign strategist and advisor to McCain's 2008 presidential campaign, was part of the leadership behind the anti-Trump group The Lincoln Project and endorsed Biden. In late August 2020, a group of 100 former McCain staffers released a group endorsement of Biden's campaign. This group included individuals such as Mark Salter. Additionally, the Biden campaign itself was not alone in invoking McCain in Arizona campaign ads supporting Biden's candidacy. In late August 2020, the group Republican Voters Against Trump began airing an ad in Arizona which contrasted McCain's acceptance speech at the 2008 Republican National Convention with inflammatory statements made by Trump.

In addition to having been friends with Biden, McCain had had a negative relationship with Trump. Even after McCain's death, Trump had continued to issue slights towards him.

Cindy McCain's endorsement of Biden, as well as the publicly bad relationship between Donald Trump and John McCain, were speculated to be contributing factors to Biden's narrow victory in the 2020 United States presidential election in Arizona, which saw Biden become the first Democratic presidential nominee since 1996, and only the second since 1948, to capture McCain's home state.

McCain was also invoked by Democrats in other races. Amy McGrath, a Democratic candidate in the 2020 United States Senate election in Kentucky ran in an attack ad against the senate seat's Republican incumbent, Mitch McConnell, which was centered around footage of McCain's vote against the American Health Care Act of 2017. In a tweet, McCain's widow, Cindy McCain, expressed her disapproval of this use of McCain's image, writing that she was "disappointed" that McGrath would use McCain's image to attack McConnell, who she described as having been a "good friend" of McCain's. Cindy McCain also wrote that, "John’s memory should be used promote common ground and civility not to stoke division". McGrath claimed that she had reached out to an unnamed member of the McCain family about the ad before running it and had “received encouragement" from them.

=== Shift of the Arizona Republican Party against McCain's legacy ===
Since McCain's death, the Arizona Republican Party, which he had for decades been considered the standard bearer of, has moved away from McCain. The state party organization, which was reshaped by Donald Trump and state party chairwoman Kelli Ward (who had challenged McCain in the Republican primary during his 2016 reelection campaign and was elected state party chairwoman in 2019, unseating a McCain ally), openly attacked the legacy of McCain. This shift of the state party against McCain was illustrated in 2022 by the rhetoric of Republican gubernatorial nominee Kari Lake, who associated herself with Donald Trump and spoke negatively about McCain and his politics, Lake had, only years earlier, before her political career, praised McCain as an "icon" and "hero". However, during her gubernatorial run, Lake derided the late senator and his legacy. Days after winning her party's nomination, Lake boasted, "We drove a stake through the heart of the McCain machine." At a campaign event days before the general election, Lake remarked, "We don’t have any McCain Republicans in here, do we? Get the hell out!...Arizona has delivered some losers, haven’t they?" Lake was defeated in the general election by Democratic nominee Katie Hobbs.

=== Posthumous Medal of Freedom and evocation during 2024 elections ===
As president, Biden awarded McCain with a posthumous Presidential Medal of Freedom in 2022.

With Trump again the Republican presidential nominee in 2024, members of McCain's family again publicly voiced opposition to Trump's candidacy. In early September 2024, McCain's son Jimmy publicly endorsed Democratic nominee Kamala Harris in the election, and revealed that he had changed his own official party registration from independent to Democrat. McCain's daughter Meghan revealed that she did not intend to vote for either major party ticket. Additionally, in August 2024 many McCain previous staffers of McCain's 2008 presidential campaign signed an open letter endorsing Harris. In her presidential debate against Trump Harris mentioned McCain's decisive vote against the American Health Care Act of 2017 when highlighting Trump's first-term efforts as president to repeal the Affordable Care Act. Harris hailed McCain as "the late great John McCain".

In the 2024 election for United States senator from Arizona, Democratic nominee Ruben Gallego positively evoked the memory of McCain. Gallego ran against Republican nominee Kari Lake, who in her 2022 gubernatorial campaign had denigrated McCain. In his remarks at the 2024 Democratic National Convention, Gallego (himself a military veteran) mentioned McCain while lambasting Trump for disrespecting veterans. Standing on stage with other Democratic politicians that are veterans, Gallego remarked, "politicians like Donald Trump, they don’t stand with us. They called patriots like Senator McCain 'losers'. John McCain was an American hero. Show some respect!"

== Temperament ==
Journalist Adam Clymer notes of McCain that, "There is no question that he sometimes loses potential allies by his penchant for telling off other senators." Todd Purdum remarks upon a "temperament that routinely put[s] him atop insiders' lists of the most difficult senators on Capitol Hill." A 2006 Washingtonian survey of Capitol Hill staff ranked McCain as having the second "Hottest Temper" in the Senate. Former Senator Rick Santorum says that, "John was very rough in the sandbox. Everybody has a McCain story. If you work in the Senate for a while, you have a McCain story. ... He hasn't built up a lot of goodwill." Writer Elizabeth Drew quoted a senator who admired McCain as saying, "Dealing with John McCain is kind of like dancing with a cactus."

In 1989, McCain screamed at Senator Richard Shelby an inch from his face, during a heated cabinet nomination battle for McCain's friend John Tower. In 1992, McCain and Senator Chuck Grassley got into a heated argument, with shoving and profanities, over a POW/MIA committee issue. They did not speak to each other for two years before reconciling. At a meeting in 2007 on immigration legislation, fellow Republican Senator John Cornyn objected to McCain: "Wait a second here. I've been sitting in here for all of these negotiations and you just parachute in here on the last day. You're out of line." McCain replied, "Fuck you! I know more about this than anyone else in the room."

McCain had stated: "It is apparent that I'm not the most popular member of the Senate." The Almanac of American Politics comments that "[McCain's] opposition to what he considers pork barrel spending ... provides him plenty of material for his self-deprecating jokes about how unpopular he is with many colleagues." Regarding his temper, or what cultural writer Julia Keller characterizes as passionate conviction, McCain acknowledges it, while also saying that the stories have been exaggerated. Renshon notes that having a temper is not unusual for U.S. leaders, with George Washington, Andrew Jackson, Ulysses S. Grant, Theodore Roosevelt, Harry Truman, Lyndon Johnson, and Bill Clinton among those sharing the trait. McCain employed both profanity and shouting on occasion. Adam Clymer sees McCain's nature as possibly misfit for the Senate: "McCain is an impatient man—perhaps because he lost five years of his life as a prisoner of war in North Vietnam—in an institution that worships delay and rewards endurance." George "Bud" Day, McCain's former POW cellmate and subsequent lifelong friend, found McCain's temperament in the Senate amusingly consistent with his past practice of going around the POW camp, taunting and yelling obscenities at the North Vietnamese guards. Phillip Butler, who knew McCain at the Naval Academy and was also a POW with him, said, "John has an infamous reputation for being a hot head." McCain's sometimes explosive temper was an integral part of his somewhat unorthodox, but effective and admired, leadership style when he was commanding officer of the VA-174 naval air squadron in the mid-1970s.

Such incidents have become less frequent over the years: senators supporting his 2008 presidential campaign said that McCain had calmed down during the 2000s, and reporters have noted almost no flare-ups during the 2008 presidential campaign. Senator Susan Collins, who endorsed McCain in the 2008 primaries on the basis of his character and not his political positions, said, "People tend to feel very strongly about John both ways." Senator Thad Cochran, who has known McCain and the McCain family for decades and has battled McCain over earmarks, represents one view: "The thought of his being president sends a cold chill down my spine. He is erratic. He is hotheaded. He loses his temper and he worries me." Ultimately Cochran decided to support McCain for president, after it was clear he would win the nomination. Senator Joseph Lieberman, an enthusiastic cross-party 2008 McCain backer, represents the other view with this observation: "[McCain's] is not the kind of anger that is a loss of control. He is a very controlled person." Following the election, there have been occasional in-Senate flare-ups, such as during the December 2010 debate over repeal of the U.S. military's "Don't ask, don't tell" policy. Reconciliations were possible too: Senate Majority Leader Harry Reid had said in 2008, "I can't stand John McCain," but by 2013, after successfully working with him on several negotiations, Reid said, "I worked with him for 31 years. And we've had some pretty difficult times together, but in the 31 years we've worked together, there is no one I have ever worked with that is more a man of his word or a person of his word than John McCain."

McCain's relations with his own Senate staff have reflected less tension: doors to his office were usually kept open and staffers called him by his first name. Moreover, staffers stayed with his office for an unusually long time, over eight years on average at one point. McCain's senior campaign staff have shown a passionate loyalty towards him, a loyalty that continues even from people forced to leave his campaign after intra-staff squabbles. McCain had many run-ins and heated confrontations with people in Arizona political circles, but a number of them would later become contributors to his political campaigns.

== Controversial remarks ==
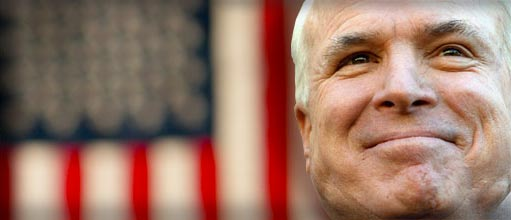
Senator McCain with the American flag in the background

The characteristics that led to McCain gaining hundreds of demerits at the Naval Academy have never fully left him; by his own admission, he had an "irremediable" personality trait of being "a wiseass," and as he added: "Occasionally my sense of humor is ill-considered or ill-timed, and that can be a problem." Others have concurred: A 2007 Associated Press story was titled "McCain's WMD Is a Mouth That Won't Quit", while in 2008, Politico described McCain's humor as "rooted in a time before there was political correctness" and a characteristic that is viewed either as a mark of authenticity or as out of touch with contemporary mores. Over the years this trait has led to a series of controversial remarks, with targets both domestic and foreign.

In 1986, Representative McCain was reported to have joked about a woman enjoying being raped by a gorilla, when speaking at a conference of the National League of Cities and Towns in Washington, D.C. Other reports put the alleged rape joke in 1984 rather than 1986. McCain said in the 1980s that he did not recall telling that joke.

In his 1986 Senate campaign, at a college appearance he referred to Arizona's Leisure World retirement community as "Seizure World", remarking that in the previous election, "97 percent of the people who live there came out to vote. I think the other 3 percent were in intensive care." While the young audience laughed, his Democratic opponent soon jumped on the remark; McCain would later concede that it was a joke whose offense he made worse when he did not quickly apologize for it.

In 1998, McCain made a joke during a speech at a Republican fundraiser about President Clinton's daughter, Chelsea, saying: "Why is Chelsea Clinton so ugly? Because her father is Janet Reno." The joke was thought so offensive that many newspapers declined to print it verbatim; McCain's biographer Robert Timberg would characterize it as "an unspeakable thing to say, unworthy of him." McCain subsequently said: "This is the bad boy. It was stupid and cruel and insensitive. I've apologized. I can't take it back." His letter of apology to President Clinton was described as "abject, contrite, and profuse." In response, White House spokesman Mike McCurry said: "To make a further issue of the matter would lend further exposure to an offensive joke. In light of the senator's apology, they [the first family] decided to drop the matter."

In the 2000 Presidential race, McCain stated that "I hate the gooks," and that "I will hate them as long as I live." Until the year 2000, McCain used the ethnic slur "gook" in reference to the individuals who had tortured him in Vietnam, and reaction among Vietnamese Americans to McCain's use of this term was mixed, but they were generally supportive of McCain's candidacy, for example as shown in exit polls in the primary in California. During his presidential campaign that year, he at first refused to apologize for his continued use of the term, stating that he reserved its reference only to his captors; then after continued criticism from some in the Asian American community, McCain vowed to no longer use the term, saying, "I will continue to condemn those who unfairly mistreated us. But out of respect to a great number of people for whom I hold in very high regard, I will no longer use the term that has caused such discomfort."

At a VFW Hall in South Carolina in 2007, a veteran asked when the U.S. would "send an air mail message to Iran." McCain jokingly responded by singing "Bomb bomb bomb, bomb bomb Iran," to the tune of The Beach Boys' "Barbara Ann" (from the 1980 "Bomb Iran" song parody by Vince Vance & The Valiants), and then seriously explained his concerns about Iran while stopping short of a bombing endorsement. When later asked about the singing, McCain stated, "My response is: lighten up and get a life." Asked whether it was insensitive, McCain retorted, "Insensitive to what? The Iranians?"

As a guest on The Daily Show a few days later in 2007, and following a trip to Baghdad, host and longtime friend Jon Stewart asked McCain, "What do you want to start with, the bomb Iran song or the walk through the market in Baghdad?" McCain responded by saying, "I think maybe shopping in Baghdad ... I had something picked out for you, too—a little IED to put on your desk." When anti-Iraq-war Democrats objected to the remark, McCain advised that they too, "Lighten up and get a life."

== Traditions and family ==
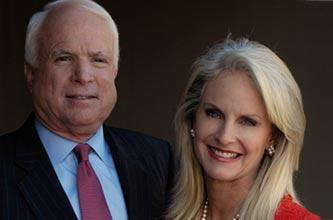
John and Cindy McCain, c. 2007

McCain emphasized the role in his life of the family tradition of service to one's country, as exemplified by his father and grandfather; it was the predominant theme of his 1999 memoir Faith of My Fathers. Both his forebears had difficulty coping with the end of war; his grandfather felt listless and died several days after the formal conclusion of World War II, while his father felt despair over his reluctant retirement from the United States Navy and fell into prolonged poor health afterwards. McCain felt that his father's "long years of binge drinking" had caught up with him, despite his mostly successful subsequent recovery in Alcoholics Anonymous. McCain had been troubled by the sporadic manifestations of his father's alcoholism while growing up, and Matt Welch saw McCain's experience of living with that, as well as witnessing his wife Cindy's three-year addiction to painkillers in the early 1990s, as causing his speech and writings to be populated with the language and emotions of twelve-step programs. In particular, Welch saw McCain as "disarmingly talented at admitting his narcissistic flaws" and constantly seeking to invest in a cause greater than self-interest.

McCain is known for his responses to attacks upon his family. An opponent of his in the 1982 Republican House primary contacted his first wife Carol, seeking negative material on McCain. She refused to discuss her marriage, and then next time McCain met the opponent, he said: "I understand you called my ex-wife. I want you to know that, campaign aside, politics aside, you ever do anything like that again, anything against a person in my family, I will personally beat the shit out of you." The smear campaign against his adopted Bangladeshi daughter during the 2000 South Carolina presidential primary so bothered him that, by some accounts, he considered leaving the Republican Party.

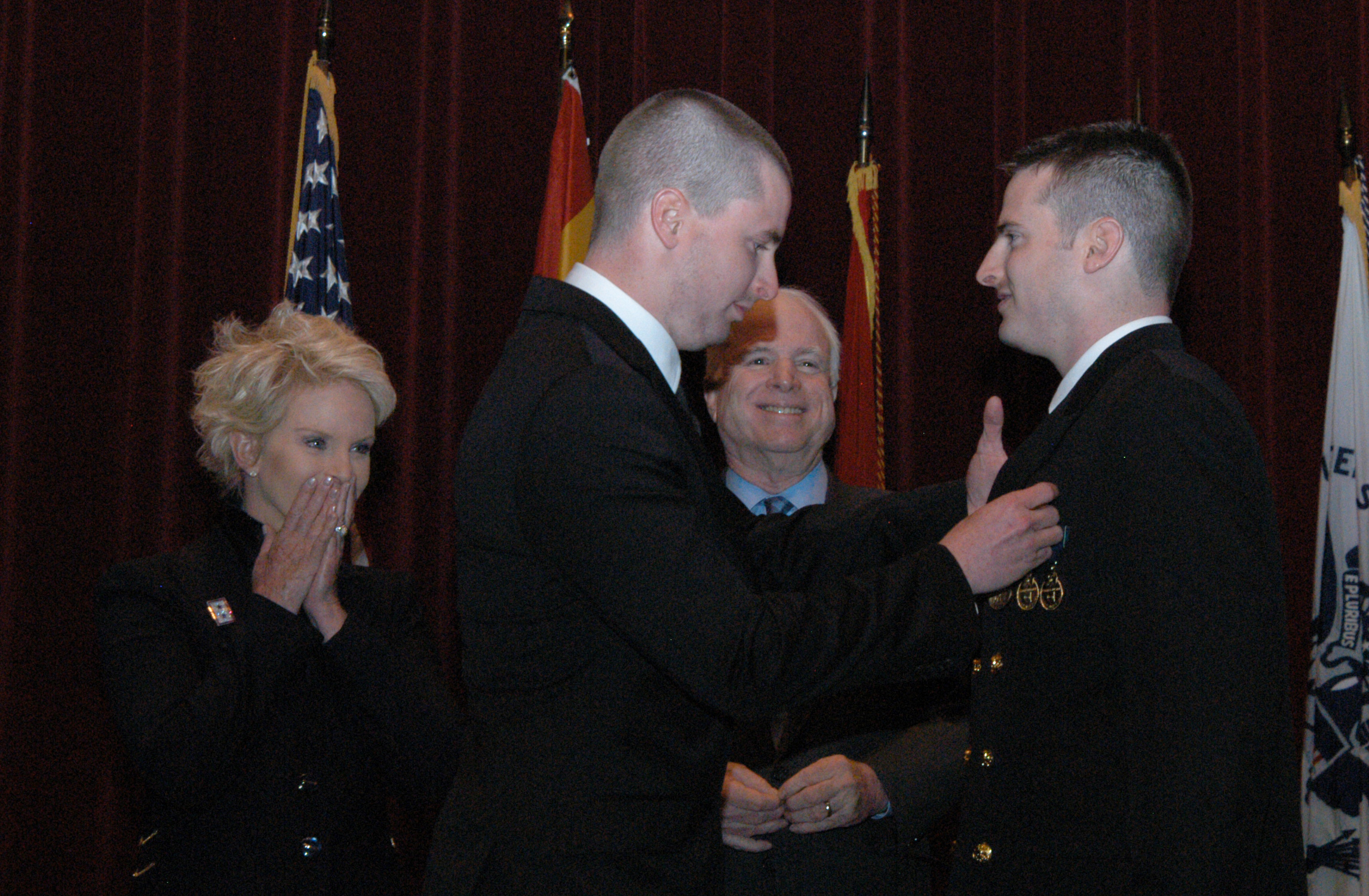
Cindy and John McCain look on as their son Jimmy pins naval aviator's wings on their son Ensign John S. McCain IV, at a January 2011 ceremony at Naval Air Station Whiting Field

The traditions McCain was brought up under have extended to his own family. His son John Sidney IV ("Jack") enrolled at the U.S. Naval Academy and graduated in 2009, after which he went to Naval Air Station Pensacola for training as a naval aviator, just as his father had, followed by helicopter pilot training at Naval Air Station Whiting Field, where he graduated from in January 2011. He was subsequently assigned to the HSC-25 "Island Knights" squadron in Guam, flying the MH-60S Knighthawk. His son James ("Jimmy") enlisted in the U.S. Marine Corps in 2006, began recruit training later that year, and by early 2008 was a Lance Corporal who had served a tour of duty as part of Operation Iraqi Freedom. He subsequently served a second tour in Iraq as well, then left to attend college, with possible plans to return to the Marines. His daughter Meghan graduated from Columbia University, worked and blogged on his presidential campaign, and subsequently became a blogging, Twittering, and book publishing fixture on the Republican Party scene with some of the same maverick tendencies as her father. His daughter Bridget is a student at Arizona State University. From his first marriage, his son Doug graduated from the University of Virginia, became a Navy A-6E Intruder carrier pilot, then a commercial pilot for American Airlines; his son Andrew is vice president and CFO at Hensley & Co. and chair of the Greater Phoenix Chamber of Commerce; and his daughter Sidney is a recording industry executive living in Toronto who has worked for Capitol Records and V2 Records.

Altogether he has seven children, born across four decades, including three with Carol—all of whom, as of 2007, were reported to be on good terms with him, his wife, and each other—and, as of 2007, four grandchildren. Cindy McCain suffered a stroke in 2004 due to high blood pressure, but made a mostly full recovery. They resided in Phoenix, and she remains the chair of the large Anheuser-Busch beer and liquor distributor Hensley & Co., founded by her father. By September 2007, McCain's denominational migration was complete, and he was identifying himself as a Baptist. More broadly, he identified himself as a Christian rather than an evangelical Christian. Most people know him as being a maverick in the political arena, but he was also a friend of ISKCON devotees. He used to greet them with saying "Hare Krishna!", and accepted copies of Bhagavad-gita As It Is and sacred garlands from them on several occasions.
