= Thirteen Soldiers =

Thirteen Soldiers: A Personal History of Americans at War
- Author: John McCain and Mark Salter
- Language: English
- Publisher: Simon & Schuster
- Publication date: November 11, 2014
- Media type: Hardcover
- Pages: 384
- ISBN: 1-4767-5965-0
- Preceded by: Hard Call
- Followed by: The Restless Wave

Thirteen Soldiers: A Personal History of Americans at War (styled 13 Soldiers on the front cover) is a 2014 book by United States Senator John McCain and his frequent collaborator and former staff member Mark Salter. (Unlike their previous books, with this one Salter has a co-equal writing credit rather than a 'with' credit.) Published by Simon & Schuster, it contains a chapter representing one person's story from each of America's thirteen major wars.

== Summary ==
The soldiers described, and the wars they fought in, are:

1. Joseph Plumb Martin, American Revolutionary War
2. Charles Black, War of 1812
3. Samuel Chamberlain, Mexican–American War
4. Oliver Wendell Holmes Jr., American Civil War
5. Edward L. Baker Jr., Spanish–American War
6. Littleton Waller, Philippine–American War
7. Elton Mackin, World War I
8. Guy Gabaldon, World War II
9. Chester "Pete" Salter, Korean War
10. Leo K. Thorsness, Vietnam War
11. Mary Rhoads, Gulf War
12. Monica Lin Brown, War in Afghanistan (2001–present)
13. Michael A. Monsoor, Iraq War

Only three of the thirteen are officers and there is diversity among the thirteen, with two African Americans and two women represented as well as people from different social classes. Their activities notable range from traditional battlefield heroics to medics saving lives to refusals to follow illegal orders. McCain said: "We try to, kind of, give a cross-section of people who - the only thing that really bound them together was the fact that they served their country with heroism and sacrifice."

While McCain and Salter described the military lives of McCain and his two famous admiral forebears in their 1999 Faith of My Fathers, in this book it is the chapter on the Korean War that describes the actions of Salter's father, Chester "Pete" Salter. The elder Salter (1927-1999) was in the U.S. Navy during World War II but in the U.S. Army as infantry in the Korean War. He was awarded the Silver Star for courageous actions taken near Anju, South Pyongan in North Korea on November 5, 1950, as UN forces advanced towards the Yalu River. In this action, which is described in this book, Salter was one of the soldiers who interacted with Mitchell Red Cloud, Jr., who posthumously received the Medal of Honor for the November 5 action. (The actions of Red Cloud are more fully described in McCain and Salter's 2004 volume Why Courage Matters.)

== Reception ==
In a review for the Wall Street Journal, Alexander Rose wrote that "McCain and Salter have chosen a thoughtful array of subjects" and that the book was in the tradition of Plutarch's Parallel Lives and the romances and chronicles of Medieval literature in revealing how character and codes of behavior can lead to greatness. However Rose disagrees with the authors' implicit assumption that soldiers across all these wars faced similar challenges or that their experiences were similarly "transforming".

A review in Roll Call complimented the authors, saying: "John McCain knows from experience that nobody is a better comrade in the trenches of writing than Salter. The two combine the fog of war with the fog of writing. Salter has a vocabulary as rich as McCain’s insights."

Military Review said that McCain and Salter "do an incredible job of bringing to life not only the experiences and stories of the individuals being examined, but also of those who served around them." However it chided the authors for including only a general bibliography and not specific citations for possibly novel statements and said that as a consequence the book was well-suited to general audiences but not academic ones.

Publishers Weekly said "McCain and Salter aptly reveal humanizing moments in such theaters of cruelty.” Kirkus Reviews summarized the book as containing "A patriotic though unsentimental look at the major wars fought by the United States as told through the difficult experiences of ordinary soldiers."

McCain appeared in media interviews to promote the book and also did some book signings.

Thirteen Soldiers was published in trade paperback in November 2015.
