= Faith of My Fathers (film) =

2005 film

- DVD cover
- Genre: Biographical drama
- Based on: Faith of My Fathers by: John McCain; Mark Salter
- Written by: Peter Markle; William Bingham
- Directed by: Peter Markle
- Starring: Shawn Hatosy; Cary-Hiroyuki Tagawa; Joe Chrest; Erin Cottrell; Chi Muoi Lo; Shea Whigham; Troy Ruptash; Scott Glenn
- Music by: Velton Ray Bunch
- Country of origin: United States
- Original language: English

Production
- Executive producers: Tom Thayer; Howard Braunstein; Michael Jaffe; Delia Fine
- Producer: Alan Barnette
- Cinematography: Bill Roe
- Editor: Scott Boyd
- Running time: 90 minutes
- Production companies: Traveler's Rest Films; Jaffe-Braunstein Films; Sony Pictures Television

Original release
- Network: A&E
- Release: May 30, 2005

Faith of My Fathers is a 2005 American biographical drama television film directed by Peter Markle and written by Markle and William Bingham, based on the 1999 memoir by United States Senator and former United States Navy aviator John McCain (with Mark Salter). It aired on A&E on Memorial Day, May 30, 2005.

Filmed in New Orleans, Faith of My Fathers is based on the story of Lieutenant Commander John McCain's experiences as a prisoner of war in North Vietnam for five and a half years during the Vietnam War, interleaved with his memories of growing up in a heritage rich with military service. Shawn Hatosy stars as John McCain, with Scott Glenn as his father, Admiral Jack McCain. Of the North Vietnamese captors, Chi Muoi Lo plays the keyman "Prick" and Cary-Hiroyuki Tagawa plays prison commander "Cat".

== Plot ==
John McCain flies his jet from a carrier on a bombing mission over Hanoi, North Vietnam. As a warning buzzer announces incoming missiles, McCain stays with the bomb drop, but is hit by a missile. He lands in the water and is pulled ashore by an angry mob, and taken prisoner. Asked to give information, he gives out the names of the Green Bay Packers rather than of his squadron. In flashbacks, his father tells of how his submarine escaped destruction in World War II, and told him not to worry about his grades, as his father and grandfather "really fooled them" by rising to admiral despite doing poorly in school. In prison, McCain sees other prisoners cruelly tortured, while he sees a couple who appear to have decided to cooperate with the enemy. McCain is given a choice to be released early in recognition that his father is commander of U.S. forces in the Pacific, but he refuses, and suffers for it. During a stepped-up bombing campaign, the prisoners sing "Silent Night", after which negotiations result in a release of prisoners and a trip home.

== Cast ==
- Shawn Hatosy as John McCain
- Scott Glenn as Jack McCain
- Cary-Hiroyuki Tagawa as Cat
- Joe Chrest as Craner
- Chi Muoi Lo as Prick
- Erin Cottrell as Carol McCain
- Troy Ruptash as Bud Day
- Shea Whigham as Norris Overly
- Brian F. Durkin as Henry Witt
- Nick Gomez as Becker
- Michael Arata as Captain Hart
- Korbi Dean as Roberta McCain

== Production ==
Faith of My Fathers was shot in New Orleans. Filming locations included the former Falstaff Brewery (as the Hanoi Hilton) and Tulane University (as the United States Naval Academy).

== Reception ==
When initially aired, the film had 3.7 million viewers, and was A&E's highest-rated program in over a year.

Reviews for Faith of My Fathers were mixed, with Variety calling the treatment an "earnest adaptation" and "a stark, by-the-numbers account of the horrors POWs endured in Vietnam", while The Washington Post said the film was "serviceable" but fell short of McCain's "much more nuanced" memoir. The New York Times said the film lacked complexity and texture, but that it was "a respectful, moving view of a veteran's effort to pay respects to his family and fellow P.O.W.'s."

The film was nominated for four Primetime Emmy Awards, in categories involving art direction, cinematography, and editing, but did not win any of them. It was also a nominee for the American Society of Cinematographers Awards of 2005. It was released to DVD by Sony Pictures Television on August 30, 2005.

A DVD of the film was commercially released in June 2008 by Sony Pictures Entertainment, and was also used as a contribution reward by McCain's 2008 presidential campaign.

== See also ==
- Early life and military career of John McCain
