= Riding in Town Cars with Boys =

- Gossip Girl episode
- Episode no.: Season 5 Episode 10
- Directed by: Vince Misiano
- Written by: Amanda Lasher
- Original air date: December 5, 2011

Episode chronology
← Previous "Rhodes to Perdition"	Next → "The End of the Affair?"
- Gossip Girl season 5

"Riding in Town Cars with Boys" is the tenth episode of season 5 of the TV series Gossip Girl. The episode was directed by Vince Misiano and written by Amanda Lasher. It was aired on December 5, 2011, on the CW. It is the winter finale with the fifth season starting again on January 16, 2012.

Similar to previous names in the series, the title of the episode references a piece of media. The specific title reference is in this instance taken from the 2001 film Riding in Cars with Boys, starring Drew Barrymore.

== Plot ==
The episode starts with a recap of the previous episode, "Rhodes to Perdition", and the title sequence.

Charlie is shown cutting her old IDs that have the name "Ivy Dickens" on them.

Serena, Lily, Charlie, Rufus, and Dan are seen at breakfast celebrating the upcoming announcement of Charlie to New York's Upper East Side society. She mentions how appreciative she is of Lily and that she works at The Spectator with Nate again.

Dan announces that his book is catching more attention lately. Serena and he have a small tiff and Lily mentions they need to move on from Serena ruining Dan's book's chances of becoming a movie.

Nate is on the phone with an employee and Chuck is looking at an article about how Blair's wedding may be off. Nate suggests that he should call Blair but Chuck doesn't because "Louis is the father of her child, there's no way she'll give that up".

Blair is continuing to have trouble with Louis. Dorota suggests that Louis may not be back yet because Blair still has feelings for Chuck. She instantly shoots them down.

Serena and Dan are having a good conversation and seem as if they may be making up. Serena says that the book showed each person in it how they don't want to end up. She says how she hasn't changed yet. Dan says maybe she needs to dethrone Gossip Girl.

Rufus suggests to Dan that he is still in love with Blair and he needs to tell her how he feels even if Blair doesn't reciprocate those feelings and Dan seems like he may listen to his father's advice.

Nate is at the office when Tripp drops by. Nate mentions how he's going to a retreat with his grandfather while Tripp wasn't invited. Tripp wasn't invited because he had discovered that his wife's fake infidelity was William's doing.

Blair is feeling the pressure of the paparazzi and decides she needs to leave her penthouse. She receives a call from Dan and ends up at his loft in Brooklyn. Dan asks Blair if the reason Louis isn't around is because of Chuck. Blair admits that she has some feelings for Chuck because he has become the man she's always wanted him to be, but Louis has too. They start a list of pro's and con's but Blair comes to the conclusion that Louis is the father of her child and that she has to stay with him. She asks Dan how it would feel to be a father to another man's baby and he said that it would be worth it.

Max asks Charlie for more money or he will reveal her lies. She says she can stand anything with her family.

Serena is looking through old Gossip Girl blasts and comes upon the revelation that, besides Nate, Dan was the last good man she's dated.

Blair calls Chuck. She asks him if he could love another man's child and expresses how scared she is to choose a man. He tells her that it wouldn't be a mistake to marry the father of her child.

Nate confronts William van der Bilt about Tripp and his wife and the truth comes out that he had arranged Nate's job at The Spectator. He tells Nate that Nate is the one who knows which way their family needs to go in order to stay leaders. William leaves and Max enters. He pleads to Nate to listen to his story but Nate shuts him out.

Serena tells Dan that he needs to stay away from Blair. Louis comes to see her and they hang out.

Charlie comes to see Nate. Nate tells her about Max coming to sell Charlie's story. Nate expresses that he might not go to the weekend trip with his grandfather. Charlie reassures him that he earned his job.

Lily goes to Chuck and asks if he is okay with Blair. She tells him to come to talk to her whenever he feels something for Blair. Chuck says that he doesn't want her to have to bear that burden. Lily says that she's always loved Chuck as her own and she hopes he can feel that love for someone some day.

Louis expresses his concern for Blair to Serena. Serena tells him he needs to stop scheming in order to be with Blair and gives him her location.

Blair tells Dan that Chuck said she needs to marry Louis and she is unable to hide her unhappiness. Dan asks her what she really wants and she says she wants to be happy again but doesn't know how to. Dan says he thinks he may know a way.

William goes to speak with Tripp and is angry with him that Tripp tried to undermine his relationship with Nate. Tripp begs William not to drop him because he needs him to have a career but William ignores him and leaves. Max walks up to Tripp and offers to help him if Tripp with help Max.

Louis is shown banging on Dan's loft doors when Chuck enters. They get in to the loft but Blair and Dan are not there.

Dan takes Blair to the party in a fire-lit room. He says that no one knows where they are.

Max shows up to Charlie's party but Nate stops him. Max tells him that there are people that will want to hear his story. Nate tells him he will make sure that he won't get in and tells Charlie that Max is at the party. Dan takes Chuck to Blair, revealing to all of their friends where Blair is.

Blair asks Chuck why he's here and he says that Dan arranged it. He says he should have fought for Blair and tells her he wants to raise her baby together. Gossip Girl sends a blast with Blair's location. She decides she needs to leave and Chuck tells her he's leaving with her. Nate helps them leave unnoticed. Lily calls a speech in front of all. She expresses her admiration for her niece and Charlie sees Chuck and Blair leaving. As Blair and Chuck pull away in a limo, a puddle of oil is shown that leaked from the car.

Dan tells Serena that he didn't tell Blair his feelings because he realized he needed to help Blair towards Chuck. He says that her being with Chuck was what was going to make her happy, which is what he wanted in the first place. Serena says that he's one of the good ones.

Max calls Charlie and tells her he's leaving and that she will be living a lie for the rest of her life.

Chuck and Blair are well on their way to leaving but paparazzi are following dangerously. Blair confesses her love for Chuck and that she's going to tell Louis her decision. They speculate about where they're going and Blair finally notices that the paparazzi is following them. Nate realizes he's not going the right way when Blair and Chuck's limo crashes due to the paparazzi.

Serena and Dan arrive at the hospital and Nate tells them that it is pretty bad. Lily gets off of the phone with Blair's family when Charlie arrives. Serena gets angry and blames the crash on Gossip Girl. Nate says that he will help Serena take down Gossip Girl by using The Spectator to do it.

Charlie tells Rufus that she sent the Gossip Girl blast because she was scared that Max would do too much damage. Lily arrives back with the others. She says that Blair is awake and responsive but when Serena asks about Chuck, Lily is silent. As Charlie is leaving, a group of medical professionals rush away.

Diana is seen in a limo. She receives a call from Jack Bass and she says she'll go back to New York.
