= Rhodes to Perdition =

- Gossip Girl episode
- Episode no.: Season 5 Episode 9
- Directed by: Andrew McCarthy
- Written by: Natalie Krinsky
- Original air date: November 28, 2011

Episode chronology
← Previous "All the Pretty Sources"	Next → "Riding in Town Cars with Boys"
- Gossip Girl season 5

"Rhodes to Perdition" is the ninth episode of season 5 on the show, Gossip Girl. The episode was directed by Andrew McCarthy and written by Natalie Krinsky. It was aired on November 28, 2011 on the CW.

Similar to previous names in the TV series, the title of the episode references a work on literature. The title reference is from the 2002 film, Road to Perdition.

== Plot ==
Lily and Charlie and shown looking at clothing. They speak of a "Studio 54" party in honor of their grandmother and mother, CeCe Rhodes (Caroline Lagerfelt). CeCe decides not to invite her other daughter, Carol.

Serena and Max arrive at Blair's reflecting of their long, but fun, night. Max asks her to hang out later but Serena says she needs to pick up a cake for her grandmother's party. Max offers to bake the cake and they make plans.

Rufus enters their Brooklyn loft to see Dan checking in on people who do not like his book under the name, "DanFan". Gossip Girl releases a blast about an account under the name, "ihatehumphrey".

Blair expresses to Dorota how she wants the old Louis back in or to marry him. She says she needs the time away from Louis to find what is wrong with him and "right it". She then visits Chuck's penthouse to see him meditating with a monk. She asks him how he changed so she will know how to change Louis to become a better man.

Nate holds a meeting with the Spectator staff. He expresses his desire to change what the newspaper was becoming under Diana. Nate says that he wants validated stories. One of his employees comes to him and says there's a story coming out involving an affair with his cousin, Tripp van der Bilt (Aaron Tveit).

Meanwhile, Max enters a diner to meet Charlie. Charlie says that she doesn't have the money yet and Max threatens to reveal her lies. Charlie begs Max not to tell Lily (Kelly Rutherford) about their past together. Max exits and Charlie calls Carol. Carol says that CeCe changed the bank account rules. Any withdrawal over $50,000 needs her signature. Charlie's mission is to keep Max away from Serena and Carol will deal with her mother, CeCe.

Carol shows up at Lily's penthouse asking CeCe to forgive her, saying that Charlie and her have made up. Carol requests an invitation to CeCe's party and CeCe accepts.

Charlie enters Serena's room asking about Serena and Max's date. Serena tells her about the plans they've made to bake CeCe's cake later in the day. Charlie talks down Max and reminds Serena that Max came to New York to see his ex-girlfriend. Serena decides to cancel her date with Max.

William van der Bilt visits Nate at the Spectator to see how things are going on his first day as editor-in-chief. Nate tells his grandfather about how his employee came forward with a story about how his cousin, Tripp van der Bilt's wife is cheating on him. Nate promises he won't run anything until he speaks with Tripp.

Carol stages a conversation with Charlie about how she needs money to buy Charlie an apartment. CeCe tells Carol if Charlie wants an apartment then she should ask her herself. Carol and CeCe's conversation gets heated and Carol leaves. CeCe is taken aback and fumbles with her medication, hinting that she may be sicker than she's putting on, and Charlie helps her take some pills to calm her "blood pressure".

Max gets the message from Serena that cancels their plans. He texts Charlie saying, "Nice try. You have 24 hours or the jig is up." He then goes to Serena with a cake for CeCe. Serena confesses she cancelled because she feels that he's not over his ex-girlfriend. She invites Max to her grandmother's party, but he declines. The two make plans for the next day.

Charlie expresses concern for her grandmother. She shakes off her illness but Charlie says she understands what she's going through. Charlie apologizes for her mother and says to her grandmother, "you've been so generous, I didn't want to ask for more". CeCe agrees to release the funds the next day.

Nate speaks to Tripp. He expresses his hurt feelings for his wife's infidelity and that he should have known. Tripp says that he understands Nate has to run the story but tells him not to let his personal feelings affect the story and Tripp exits. Nate calls his grandfather and tells him he's going to hold on running the story.

Dan visits his anti-Dan account person and it turns out to be his agent, who says that she added the account to get people to talk about Dan's book.

Blair and Chuck attend a meeting with Chuck's therapist. She wants to know how Chuck changed in order to change Louis. Chuck confesses to Blair that he left the engagement ring he bought her in front of Henry Weinstein's door and walked away. Blair is taken aback by his confession.

Lily speaks to Rufus about how she feels Carol is a horrible mother. Carol walks in and tells her to say how she really feels. Lily tells Carol how she knows that she made Charlie go under the fake name, Ivy Dickens. Serena overhears their conversation and makes the connection between Charlie and Max—that they used to date. She calls Max and invites him over at the same time as the party.

Nate tells his grandfather how he knows that Maureen, Tripp's wife, is faking the affair in order to make Tripp look better in polls. Nate tells William that he plans to reveal that Maureen's affair is not true but his grandfather convinces him to do otherwise. Nate is celebrated for not posting the story about his cousin. In the post, he says that a story was recently uncovered about someone he knows and he's not going to get involved with it.

Blair is trying cakes for her wedding when Chuck enters. Chuck accuses Blair of being upset about the ring being returned. He says that he returned it to give her the happy life she deserved. She says that she feels that she brings out the dark side of her lovers.

The Rhodes girls are celebrating before the party when Lily pulls CeCe away to look at photos. Carol expresses her jealousy that Charlie was able to get "more money out of her than I did in 45 years". Max enters and Charlie tells him to leave. Serena tells them she knows about their past. Lily comes to Charlie's rescue but Carol gets angry when Lily mentions her horrible parenting. As the tension increases, CeCe faints. Charlie says that CeCe fainted because she's been dieting in order to fit into her jumpsuits.

Blair gloats about what she said to Chuck. Chuck enters and tells her, "You are the lightest thing that came in to my life". He says he was afraid of losing her and that he's sorry he couldn't be the one to marry her. Later, Blair lays in her bed, clearly depressed from Chuck's confessions. Dorota tries to comfort her but Blair dismisses her.

Charlie continues to lie to her whole family. She says that she was paying off Max to leave because he was blackmailing her with a sex tape. He reveals very real details of her life as Ivy Dickens. CeCe supports Charlie's story and Serena tells Max to leave. The party continues and CeCe thanks Charlie for keeping her secret, and Charlie says she should tell someone if she's really sick.

Carol tells Charlie they are finally in the clear. Charlie wants to stay longer: not for the money, but a family. Charlie reveals that Ivy Dickens had a very rough upbringing. Carol says it's okay if Charlie stays because if her family knew the real Charlotte Rhodes they'd never forgive her, "This way we both get a family".

Max calls Charlie and tells her he's not leaving until he gets what he deserves. Charlie says she's a Rhodes now, and she won't lose.
