= The End of the Affair? =

- Gossip Girl episode
- Episode no.: Season 5 Episode 11
- Directed by: Michael Grossman
- Written by: Sara Goodman
- Original air date: January 16, 2012

Episode chronology
← Previous "Riding in Town Cars with Boys"	Next → "Father and the Bride"
- Gossip Girl season 5

"The End of the Affair?" is the eleventh episode of season 5 on the show, Gossip Girl. The episode was directed by Michael Grossman and written by Sara Goodman. It was aired on January 16, 2012 on the CW. This episode continues the fifth season after a winter break.

Similar to previous names in the TV series, the title of the episode references a work on literature. The title reference is from the 1999 film, The End of the Affair starring Ralph Fiennes.

== Plot ==
Following the aftermath of the car crash, Blair distances herself from Chuck as she prepares for her upcoming wedding to Louis. Unbeknownst to others, she has secretly been staying with Dan, insisting that Chuck must not learn the truth. Chuck grows suspicious of Blair’s behavior and enlists Dan to help him uncover what she is hiding, though Dan refuses.

As Blair struggles emotionally, particularly over her wedding and the loss of her baby, she confides in Dan, who encourages her to reconsider her choices. Meanwhile, Serena begins receiving Gossip Girl tips in the blogger’s absence, while Nate investigates the circumstances surrounding the crash and discovers it was not caused by paparazzi.

Chuck and Louis become convinced that Blair and Dan are having an affair and plan to expose them at a New Year’s Eve party. However, Serena intervenes, falsely claiming that she and Dan are dating to protect Blair. In private, Blair reveals to Serena that she made a vow to God to marry Louis and stay away from Chuck in exchange for Chuck’s survival after the crash.

Elsewhere, Lily learns that the woman she believed to be her niece Charlie is actually an impostor, leading to the discovery of the real Charlotte “Lola” Rhodes. Nate’s investigation further reveals that the limo involved in the crash had faulty brakes and had been ordered by Blair. At midnight, Serena and Dan share a kiss, while Blair and Louis do the same, watched by Chuck. Blair later tells Chuck they can never be together, though she admits she still loves him. Suspicious, Chuck resolves to uncover the truth behind her decision. The episode ends with Gossip Girl resurfacing, proposing an alliance with Nate.
