= G.G. (Gossip Girl) =

- Gossip Girl episode
- Episode no.: Season 5 Episode 13
- Directed by: Mark Piznarski
- Written by: Joshua Safran
- Production code: 513
- Original air date: January 30, 2012
- Running time: 41 minutes

Guest appearances
- Michelle Trachtenberg as Georgina Sparks; Zuzanna Szadkowski as Dorota Kishlovsky; Hugo Becker as Prince Louis Grimaldi; Joanne Whalley as Princess Sophie Grimaldi; Marc Menard as Father Cavalia; Wallace Shawn as Cyrus Rose; John Shea as Harold Waldorf; Margaret Colin as Eleanor Waldorf Rose; Ella Rae Peck as Charlotte "Lola" Rhodes; Amanda Setton as Penelope Shafai; Nan Zhang as Kati Farkas

Episode chronology
← Previous "Father and the Bride"	Next → "The Backup Dan"
- Gossip Girl season 5

"G.G." is the thirteenth episode of the fifth season of the American television teen drama, Gossip Girl and the show's 100th episode overall. The episode was written by executive producer Joshua Safran and directed by Mark Piznarski. It premiered on The CW Television Network (The CW) in the United States on January 30, 2012. In the episode, the wedding of Blair Waldorf (Leighton Meester) to Prince Louis Grimaldi (Hugo Becker) takes place.

The episode opened to favorable reviews, with television critics praising the fact it honored the series' successful days. Michelle Trachtenberg's performance as Georgina Sparks was also well received. Upon its initial airing, the episode was viewed by 1.39 million Americans and garnered a 0.7/2 Nielsen rating/share in the 18–49 demographic. The total viewership and ratings for this episode were slightly up in comparison to the previous episode "Father and the Bride".

== Plot ==
The episode begins with a musical dream sequence of Serena (Blake Lively), featuring herself as Marilyn Monroe singing "Diamonds Are a Girl's Best Friend" and Blair (Leighton Meester) as Audrey Hepburn. Everyone prepares for the wedding of Blair to Prince Louis Grimaldi of Monaco (Hugo Becker). Father Cavilla (Marc Menard) visits Chuck (Ed Westwick) to tell him the plan to ruin the wedding – Father Cavilla will replace Father Smythe who will mistakenly have taken sleeping pills, and when he asks during the ceremony if anyone has any objection to the marriage, Chuck will tell that Blair is still in love with him. Though he first agreed on helping him, Chuck changes his mind because he doesn't want to destroy Blair's dream and only wants her happiness.

Georgina Sparks (Michelle Trachtenberg), who has just come back in New York, then teams up with the priest in an act of revenge for everything Blair has done to her in the past. In the meantime, Serena continues to show an interest in Dan (Penn Badgley), even though he is still unaware of her love. Nate (Chace Crawford) reflects on his past failed relationships, while also taking an interest in Lola, who happens to be the real Charlie Rhodes. Blair 's mother tries to dissuade her from marrying Louis but she doesn't want to listen to her so she finds help in Chuck, who agrees to try to convince Blair to stop the wedding. Meanwhile, Georgina tries to seduce Louis and have her husband film it, but Rufus and Lily stop her.

Before the ceremony, Chuck talks to Blair who professes her undying love for him -which has been filmed by Georgina- but still refuses to call off the wedding. During the ceremony, someone sends the video of the discussion between Blair and Chuck to everyone's cell phones. The ceremony is temporarily suspended until Blair comes back to the aisle determined to marry Louis. As a result, she becomes Her Serene Highness, Princess Blair of Monaco. At the reception, Serena tells Dan how she feels about him but quickly leaves before he can answer. During their last dance, Louis reveals to Blair that it will be a loveless, contracted marriage. After hearing that, Blair runs away in a limousine with Dan at the wheel. At the end of the episode, the identity of Gossip Girl is seemingly revealed to be Georgina Sparks.

== Production ==
We wanted it to feel big, something that would feel like it was pushing the buttons in terms of the core series mythology and core characters, but would also feel shocking and something that would really work as a springboard for the whole back-half of the season.

— Josh Schwartz on the episode's storyline.

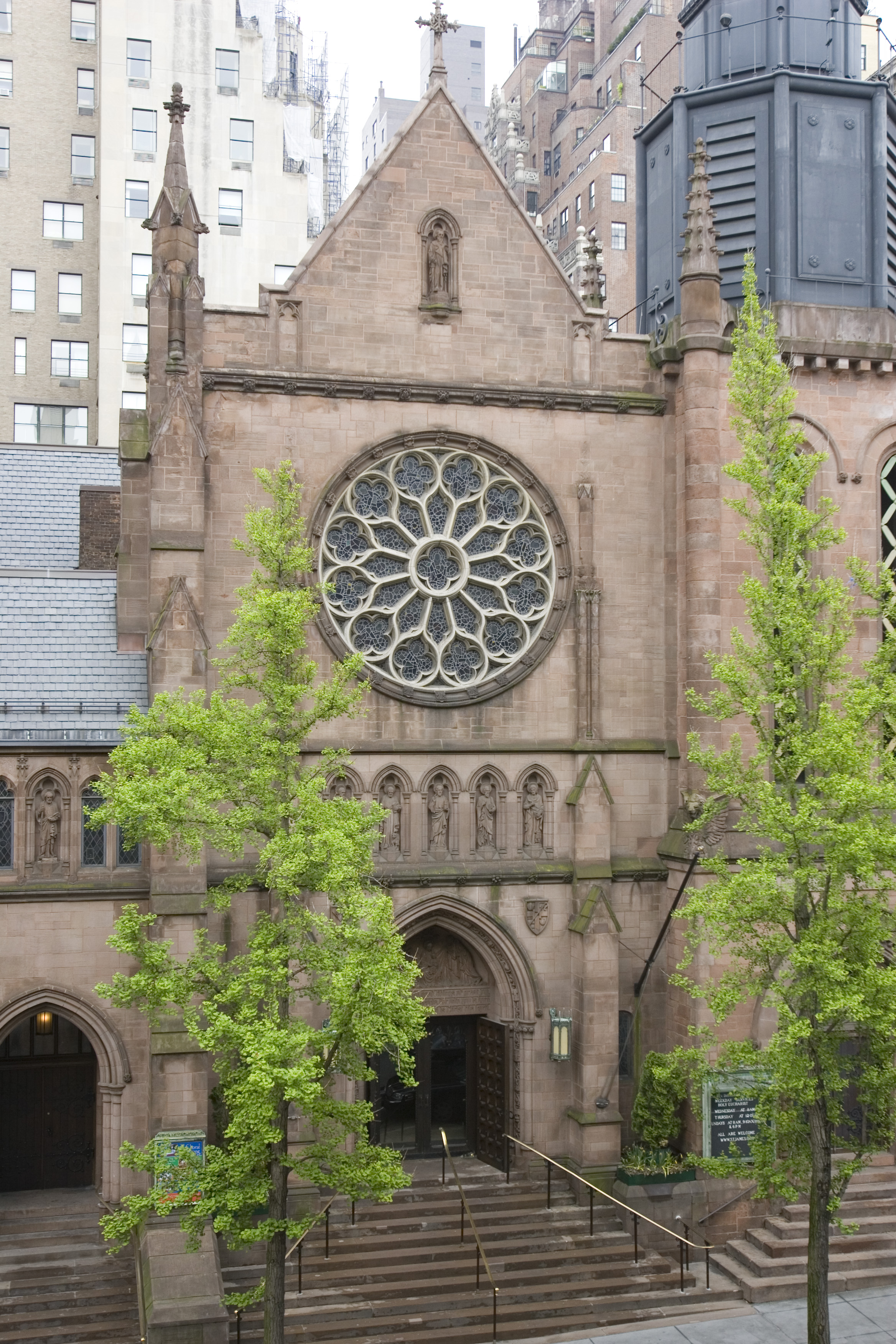
St. James' Episcopal Church, where the wedding was shot

"G.G." was written by Joshua Safran and directed by Mark Piznarski. The wedding scene was filmed at the St. James' Episcopal Church in New York on November 9, 2011. The reception that followed it was shot at The St. Regis Hotel. On November 19, 2011, news from the episode, including the title, were reported. Later on, the episode was also reported to feature a dream musical number with Serena as Marilyn Monroe, Blair as Audrey Hepburn, and the men in both their lives. Blair's wedding dress as well as Serena's maid of honor dress were designed by Vera Wang. Blair's dress appeared in InStyle's top 20 TV fashion moments of the season.

On November 1, 2011, it was announced that Michelle Trachtenberg would reprise her role as troublemaker Georgina Sparks. Other cast members included Sparks' husband Philip (Nick Cornish), Blair's father Harold (John Shea), Blair's mother (Margaret Colin), Cyrus Rose (Wallace Shawn), Princess Sophie (Joanne Whalley), and Father Cavalia (Marc Menard). Blair's minions, Penelope Shafai (Amanda Setton), Kati Farkas (Nan Zhang) and Jessica (Alice Callahan) were also present as bridesmaids.

Featured music included Peter Bjorn and John's "Young Folks" performed by The Kooks, Marilyn Monroe's "Diamonds Are a Girl's Best Friend" performed by Serena, Jon Hastings' "Endless Summer", Grouplove's "Slow", Ludwig van Beethoven's "Rondo in C Major, Op 51", INXS' "Never Tear Us Apart" performed by the Vitamin String Quartet, Pat Benatar's "We Belong" also performed by the Vitamin String Quartet and Wolf Gang's "Suego Faults".

== Reception ==
=== Ratings ===
"G.G." was first broadcast on January 30, 2012 in the United States on The CW. The episode was watched by 1.39 million Americans and scored a 0.7/2 Nielsen rating/share in the adults among the 18–49 demographic, a season high in viewership. It was also up 25% and 17% in viewers and adults 18–49, respectively, from the previous episode "Father and the Bride", which netted 1.11 million American viewers and a 0.6/2 Nielsen rating/share during its initial airing.

=== Critical reception ===
The episode received generally favorable reviews. Zap2it wrote, "Sure, Blair's (Leighton Meester) been dreaming of her fairytale wedding since she was just a little girl. But it's also true that producers of Gossip Girl have been dreaming of this moment for a long time as well. And the Upper East Side drama didn't disappoint. In fact, it was easy the best episode this season." Steve Marsi from TV Fanatic gave the episode a four stars rating out of five writing, "In what has come to be sort of a make-or-break episode, Gossip Girl had a golden opportunity to redeem its recent mediocrity and prove itself worthy of all the passion and loyalty we've invested over the years. While there were some gaping plot holes and disappointments tonight - especially depending on your couple of choice - you can't find fault with the pure number of twists, especially during the last five minutes." Marsi appreciated the references to Gossip Girl's early days, "The promised homages to the old days were there in spades, and incorporated in ways that actually fit the present-day story. Case in point: A memorable Gossip Girl quote ("I love you, always have, always will") which was spoken to a very different character long ago. Also, the cover of "Young Folks" at the onset was fun." The Huffington Post's Laura Prudom also found the episode had honored Gossip Girl's past, "For the first time in recent memory, this week's milestone episode of Gossip Girl finally recaptured the confident plotting and razor sharp shocks of its first two seasons." She also praised the fact Georgina is Gossip Girl which was totally unexpected. The Hollywood Reporter wrote, "In classic Gossip Girl fashion, the 100th episode was full of witty one-liners, many of them from the mouth of Georgina Sparks and one in honor of The Princess Bride; paid homage to the pilot; and featured several head-turning moments." Ology gave the episode a 9/10 grade.

Digital Spy writer Catriona Wightman found the episode "completely absurd" but "brillantly entertaining." Morgan Glennon of BuddyTV wrote, "Despite how ridiculous it was seeing character after character after character try to save Blair from her own stupid decisions, Gossip Girl really knows how to do big events. After 100 episodes, the show understood that it needed to go big to top off the royal wedding storyline. So the wedding, and attendant quest to stop it, was as big, dramatic and heartfelt as Gossip Girl at its best." Glennon also conceded about the Gossip Girl reveal, the show can still pull out those OMG moments. Glennon found Georgina "amazing" in the episode, "you can't even take your eyes off her because she's so great in every scene." However, The Atlantic Wire thought the writers "should have waited until the last-ever episode to do the unveiling" of Gossip Girl and questioned, "isn't that indicative of the show's greater failings over these past four and a half years? That constant need of this once-promising show to tip its hand too soon?" and concluded "we think the time has finally come to remove Gossip Girl from our bookmarks."
