= Hard Call =

2007 book by John McCain and Mark Salter

- First edition
- Author: John McCain, Mark Salter
- Language: English
- Subject: Political convictions
- Publisher: Hachette Book Group USA
- Publication date: August 14, 2007
- Publication place: United States
- Media type: Print (hardcover, paperback)
- Pages: 480
- ISBN: 978-0-446-58040-3
- OCLC: 85892201
- Dewey Decimal: 920 22
- LC Class: CT105 .M395 2007
- Preceded by: Character Is Destiny
- Followed by: Thirteen Soldiers: A Personal History of Americans at War

Hard Call: Great Decisions and the Extraordinary People Who Made Them is a book written by United States Senator John McCain with Mark Salter. Its theme is decision-making based on personal principles. The hardcover edition was released August 14, 2007, and the paperback edition was subsequently released on February 29, 2008.

McCain outlines a six-part structure for "hard calls," with several detailed anecdotes illustrating each of the six parts:

- Awareness: Jackie Robinson "intruding" into all-white baseball; and Wernher von Braun, the rocket scientist.
- Foresight: Winston Churchill; Alexander Graham Bell; and Ronald Reagan when standing up to the Soviet Union.
- Timing: Boeing's production of the commercial jet aircraft; Gillette's invention of the disposable razor; and Anwar Sadat and Menachem Begin meeting for the peace process.
- Confidence: Civil War General George B. McClellan; Gertrude Ederle, the first woman to swim the English Channel; and the Apollo 11 astronauts.
- Humility: The founding of Liberia; Harry Truman; and Gerald Ford's pardoning of Richard Nixon.
- Inspiration: The white commander of America's first black regiment; Alexander Solzhenitsyn; and Abraham Lincoln.
