= Father and the Bride =

- Gossip Girl episode
- Episode no.: Season 5 Episode 12
- Directed by: Amy Heckerling
- Written by: Peter Elkoff
- Original air date: January 23, 2012

Episode chronology
← Previous "The End of the Affair?"	Next → "G.G."
- Gossip Girl season 5

"Father and the Bride" is the 12th episode of season 5 on the show, Gossip Girl. The episode was directed by Amy Heckerling and written by Peter Elkoff. It was aired on January 23, 2012 on the CW. Similar to previous names in the TV series, the title of the episode references a work on literature. The title reference is from the 1991 film, Father of the Bride starring Steve Martin.

== Character Summary ==
Serena van der Woodsen (Blake Lively): Serena finds that she may still have feelings for Dan as they fake-date to protect Blair. She also helps Nate take down Tripp for tampering with the car meant for Nate.

Nate Archibald (Chace Crawford): Nate finds out that it was Tripp that messed with the car he was supposed to ride in and confronts him. After Tripp leaves, his grandfather tells him that he could never make it on his own.

Blair Waldorf (Leighton Meester): Blair continues to have struggles between Louis and Chuck as her wedding date is only a week away. After finding Louis's wedding vows, she is sure that she can marry Louis happily.

Chuck Bass (Ed Westwick): Chuck has decided that he wants Blair and is going to stop her wedding. He teams up with Father Cavalia to do it at the end of the episode saying, "She already thinks I'm a villain, might as well fit the part".

Daniel Humphrey (Penn Badgely): Dan is pretending to date Serena when he really has feelings for Blair. It is confirmed he does when it revealed that he wrote Louis's vows for him that Blair feels reflect who she is perfectly.

== Basic Plot (from season 5 list of episodes) ==
Blair decides to throw herself a bachelorette party, but shady enemies who include Beatrice (guest star Roxane Mesquida), and her co-conspirator cousin Father Cavette, scheme to ruin and humiliate Blair, with an unknowing Chuck as their patsy, in order to prevent Blair's upcoming marriage by any means necessary. Meanwhile, Nate, with the distant assistance of Gossip Girl, finally discovers that Tripp was responsible for the car accident that affected Blair and Chuck and he contacts William van der Bilt for help to expose Tripp's scheme. Also, Serena and Dan continue their fake relationship to protect Blair while Dan becomes uncertain about writing again.

== Detailed Plot ==
The episode starts with a recap of the previous episode, "The End of the Affair?" and the title sequence.

Nate is trying to figure out why someone wanted to target him. He texts Gossip Girl for help.

Beatrice and Blair are seen having breakfast. Blair asks Beatrice to be a bridesmaid and that she is invited to her bachelorette party. Louis is in France for his bachelor party.

Serena and Dan are walking and she says that her blog is about to launch and it's flourishing with Gossip Girl done. Dan tells her he will help with her blog.

Blair is in confession. She talks about how she is dreaming of Chuck. She expresses that she loves Louis but she can't help think about Chuck. She asks the Father to consult her but when they exit the confession it is not her usual Father. Blair walks out of the church and Chuck is there, watching her. Nate calls him and sends him a picture with Max in it that suggests he was the one that tampered with the car. He gets another e-mail from Gossip Girl.

Beatrice goes to see the Father that Blair had unknowingly confessed to. He says that if they don't stop Louis and Blair's wedding, he will lose his position. He tells Beatrice to get Blair drunk and alone with Chuck.

Serena is be photographed with her blog but it doesn't come up. Nate has deleted her blog because Gossip Girl told him to. Serena comes to talk to him and he lies and says that he has just delayed the launch.

Dan is walking with his book agent. Her agent tells him Serena is distracting his readers from him becoming a writer away from Inside. If Serena and Dan are dating, the readers will want a sequel to Inside.

Blair and Beatrice are waiting in line at a bakery. Beatrice asks her if there's anything she wants to do as a single woman but Blair says there's no point in deviating from her royal path. Blair sees Chuck spying on her. Blair decides she wants to be as far away from Chuck as possible during her bachelorette party.

Serena is waiting for Nate to arrive in his office and gets an e-mail from Gossip Girl and discovers Nate was cancelled her column because Gossip Girl told him to.

Dan is in a creative meeting with his publishers. He pitches an idea about new ideas but they tell Dan to write a sequel to Inside they tell him to continue dating Serena because it's great press.

Serena goes to confront Nate and he fires her. He tells her that he found out that Tripp tampered with the car he was supposed to ride in. Serena is yelling at Nate when his receptionist takes a video of them and sends it to Gossip Girl.

Blair and Beatrice are speculating about the nights events and Blair is clearly depressed.

Father Cavalia arrives at Chuck's hotel. He tells him that Princess Sophie is concerned of Blair's upcoming marriage. He gives Chuck the address to her bachelorette party and agrees to help get him and Blair alone.

Blair's at her party with the bridesmaids. She calls Serena to tell her the change in location. Tripp shows up at Serena's and she tells him that she supports him and that he didn't mess with the car.

The bridesmaids have rigged the game with Blair to get her drunk and it works. They seem to be having fun and Blair is clearly not in the right mindset to make good decisions. Rufus and Dan are at the loft and Dan decides to go to Blair's party and talk to Serena. Beatrice asks Blair why she's marrying Louis when she clearly doesn't love him. Blair tells her that she needs to do the right thing.

Tripp tells Serena that Maureen called the car and had the car tampered with. Nate and William come out and say that Serena and Nate staged the fight in order to get a confession out of Tripp. William says that Maureen was with him the night of the accident consulting with a divorce lawyer.

Blair steps outside of the bar, clearly drunk, and ends up getting arrested. Blair eventually gets released from jail and accuses Beatrice of trying to get her arrested but Dan says that it was Chuck that did it.

Tripp finally confesses that he was the one that damaged the car. He says that Max came up to him and told him they could help each other. Tripp paid Max to tamper with Nate's car but Max played him so Tripp was the one that messed with the car. He wanted to ruin Nate's weekend not almost get him killed. Nate commits himself to prosecuting Tripp for his actions. Serena gets a text that Blair is in jail.

Beatrice bought everyone's phones at the bar off of them to protect her from getting published. Blair now trusts Beatrice more than ever. Serena arrives at the jail and Dan says that they need to break up. Blair comes up to her and apologizes for her missing the party. Beatrice gets a call from the Father and she tells him that she's done messing with Blair.

Nate blames William for Tripp wanting to hurt him. William says he wouldn't be able to get a job like that on his own.

Chuck shows up at Blair's to see how Blair is. Serena kicks him out and tells him that she can't be around him. Chuck says he isn't giving up on their love despite Blair's eminent wedding.

Blair finds Louis's wedding vows to her and she realizes that Louis loves her even if she almost left him for Chuck and that she's sure of marrying Louis.

The Father and Beatrice are seen walking and he tells her that he told Beatrice's mother that she tried to ruin her brother's wedding and she's being sent to Africa.

Serena asks Dan to stay together and he agrees. He gets a book from Louis with a note saying thank you for writing his vows to Blair for him.

Chuck meets with the Father and tells him that Blair already thinks he's a bad person so he might as well fit the role by helping the priest take down the wedding.

End of the episode.
