= Why Courage Matters =

2004 non-fiction book by John McCain

Why Courage Matters: The Way to a Braver Life
- First edition
- Author: John McCain with Mark Salter
- Language: English
- Publisher: Random House
- Publication date: April 13, 2004
- Media type: Hardcover
- Pages: 224
- ISBN: 1-4000-6030-3
- Preceded by: Worth the Fighting For
- Followed by: Character Is Destiny

Why Courage Matters: The Way to a Braver Life is a 2004 book by United States Senator John McCain with his frequent collaborator and aide Mark Salter. Published by Random House, it is mostly mini-biographies and mini-commentaries on others, but contains a small autobiographical element.

The book followed McCain's two memoirs, Faith of My Fathers (1999) and Worth the Fighting For (2002). McCain starts by saying that in contemporary usage people talk too loosely in characterizing acts as being courageous - it should be not only "the capacity for action despite our fears" but also involve a physical self-sacrifice for the benefit of others. He says that during his time as a POW in North Vietnam during the Vietnam War, he relied on his fellow POWs for moral support but "I was not always a match for my enemies." In press interviews for the book, McCain said that courage materializes when "our fear is overcome by our conscience and our beliefs and forces us to act."

Most of the book consists of his portraits of people, both leaders and ordinary people, he thinks have shown courage. The book starts with the story of U.S. Special Forces soldier Roy Benavidez, who won the Medal of Honor for his actions during the Vietnam War. Others whose stories are in the book include American civil rights leader John Lewis, American Indian chiefs Manuelito and Barboncito, explorer John Wesley Powell, Jewish resistance fighter Hannah Szenes, Burmese dissident Aung San Suu Kyi, Baltimore anti-drugs-crime mass murder victim Angela Dawson, and U.S. Korean War soldier and Medal of Honor recipient Mitchell Red Cloud, Jr. McCain then relates how courage is needed in the aftermath of the September 11 terrorist attacks.

In a review, Publishers Weekly said that "These compelling life stories stand up against the best passages of McCain's previous works. Alas, his writing becomes more vague and less interesting when he shifts to a more abstract discussion of the need for courage in the post–September 11 era." Booklist Review said "The authors draw thoughtful lessons about the sources and types of courage and the importance of facing down fear, particularly in a world defined by color-coded terrorism alerts." Library Journal Review said that "Unfortunately, though [McCain's] message comes through loud and clear, the steps one must take to increase one's courage are not as clearly outlined as one would hope." A St. Petersburg Times review said that "McCain's blunt talk and raw honesty provide a dose of reality for the nation at this critical time."

McCain appeared in media interviews to promote the book. The book was not the major commercial success Faith of My Fathers had been, nor the lesser best seller that Worth the Fighting For had been. It did not appear on the New York Times Best Seller list.

Why Courage Matters was published in paperback by Ballantine Books on July 15, 2008, at the height of the John McCain presidential campaign, 2008.

The book was mentioned during the 2016 United States presidential election, when politically embattled parent Khizr Khan said he mailed a copy of it to his U.S. Army son Humayun Khan shortly before he was killed during the Iraq War.
