= The Restless Wave (book) =

2018 book by John McCain and Mark Salter

- First edition
- Author: John McCain and Mark Salter
- Subject: Leadership, diplomacy
- Genre: Memoir
- Published: April 17, 2018
- Publisher: Simon & Schuster
- Publication place: United States
- Media type: Print, e-book, audiobook
- Pages: 402
- ISBN: 978-1-5011-7800-9 (hardcover)
- Preceded by: Thirteen Soldiers

The Restless Wave: Good Times, Just Causes, Great Fights, and Other Appreciations is a 2018 book by American politician John McCain and his frequent collaborator and former staff member Mark Salter. It is a personal memoir looking at McCain's last ten years or so in the Senate, and his 2008 campaign for the presidency against Barack Obama. As such it is the final volume of an autobiographical trilogy that also comprises Faith of My Fathers (1999) and Worth the Fighting For (2002). It also covers his work on behalf of democracy and human rights in Eastern Europe and the Middle East. The work's title comes from the second line of the naval hymn "Eternal Father, Strong to Save", reflecting McCain's career as a naval aviator. It contains 10 chapters including Arab Spring and Regular order.

== Contents ==
The full list of chapters are:

- No surrender
- Country first
- About us
- In the company of heroes
- Arab Spring
- Fighting the good fight (with and against Ted Kennedy)
- Nyet (know thine enemy)
- Know thyself (defending the West)
- Part of the main (American exceptionalism)
- Regular order

Making reference to one of the subjects of the book, McCain writes of President Donald Trump:

His lack of empathy for refugees, innocent, persecuted, desperate men, women, and children, is disturbing. The way he speaks about them is appalling, as if welfare or terrorism were the only purposes they could have in coming to our country. He has declined to distinguish the actions of our government from the crimes of despotic ones. The appearance of toughness, or a reality show facsimile of toughness, seems to matter more than any of our values. The world expects us to be concerned with the condition of humanity. We should be proud of that reputation. I'm not sure the president understands that.

About his own political philosophy, McCain writes,

Last but not least, I was [at the time of entering Congress] a Republican, a Reagan Republican. Still am. Not a Tea Party Republican. Not a Breitbart Republican. Not a talk radio or Fox News Republican. Not an isolationist, protectionist, immigrant-bashing, scapegoating, get-nothing-useful-done Republican. Not, as I am often dismissed by self-declared 'real' conservatives, a RINO, Republican in Name Only. I'm a Reagan Republican, a proponent of lower taxes, less government, free markets, free trade, defense readiness, and democratic internationalism.

== Background ==
The book was begun as a collaboration between McCain and Salter regarding foreign policy and national security. Agreement with the publisher was reached in February 2017 but no public announcement was made. The tentative title was It's Always Darkest Before It's Totally Black, one of McCain's trademark sardonicisms.

But McCain's July 2017 diagnosis of glioblastoma changed that, and it became more of a reflective, contemplative, personal memoir. As Salter said, "He wanted it to be more personal, and to convey just how fortunate he believed he was for being able to serve this country for 60 years. What America means to him and what he thinks America means to the world, and what he hopes it will continue to mean to the world after he's gone." Salter traveled to McCain's ranch outside Sedona, Arizona to work on a memorable speech McCain gave forth unto the Senate floor, as well as the book.

The audiobook version, which runs 14 hours 15 minutes, is mostly read by actor Beau Bridges, with McCain only strong enough to record the introduction and conclusion. Due to his illness McCain did no publicity for the book, but co-author Salter did do some interviews.

On his final page, McCain returns to the model of the Ernest Hemingway character he calls his hero, Robert Jordan of For Whom the Bell Tolls. That novel ends with Jordan lying wounded on open ground, armed to fight one last battle that he knows will end with his death. "The world is a fine place and worth the fighting for," Jordan says to himself, "and I hate very much to leave it." To this, McCain adds his own response: "And I do too. I hate to leave it. But I don't have a complaint. Not one. It's been quite a ride. ... I made a small place for myself in the story of America and the history of my times."

== Commercial reception ==
The book sold over 33,000 copies in its first week of availability. It debuted atop The New York Times Non-Fiction Best Sellers of 2018 for the week of June 10. It spent four weeks on the list itself. The audiobook also appeared on the appropriate New York Times list.

Following McCain's August 25 passing in 2018, there was a renewed interest in his life and the book re-entered the New York Times list in the top spot. It then moved to number five and then number three over the following two weeks.

== Critical response ==
According to The New York Times, "One of the striking aspects of this new book is how often McCain—who says his dire medical prognosis leaves him 'freer' to speak his mind and vote his conscience 'without worry'—insists on playing it safe. The six-term senator from Arizona slips in a few careful mentions of Donald J. Trump, and expresses concern about the rancor that has overtaken the country, but he generally stops short of calling out the president or his cabinet, issuing just a brief eyeroll at the 'thoughtless America First ideology' now ascendant in the White House."

In contrast, ABC News declared that "In his memoir, McCain has blistering criticisms of Donald Trump's presidency, from his lack of empathy for immigrants and refugees to his praise for 'some of the world's worst tyrants.'"

In his review for The Guardian, Lloyd Green stated that "McCain is dying of cancer but he won't leave this earth without one more fight." It is skeptical regarding some of McCain's conclusions regarding the Iraq War, stating "Turning to the Middle East, McCain is ever the warrior, romantic and proponent of regime change—a volatile brew."

Industry stalwart Publishers Weekly opined, "Despite flashes of the 'straight talk' for which McCain has become known, this book meanders into navel-gazing detail and sometimes skirts meaningful examination. McCain lists President Trump's moral and political failings, but hedges ... Rather than a response to extraordinary times, this fine memoir reads more like a requiem of a long, patriotic life."

Kirkus Reviews characterized the work as "sometimes rueful, sometimes defiant, always affecting. Even McCain's political opponents should admire the fiery grace with which he's exiting the world."

Jason Hamill of The American Community Journals localized chain concluded, " All said the book reads as the man's final chance to set the record straight on a myriad of tough political decisions over the last several decades of his incredible career. His no-nonsense demeanor comes across in the pages as a refreshing counter-balance to most of the politick one hears on a daily basis and is most certainly recommended."

Terri Schlichenmeyer of The Pantagraph of Illinois wrote, "Like nearly every political biography ever released, there's a lot of chest-thumping and assertions of correctness inside The Restless Wave, and astute readers will note more than just a little repetition. Moreover, though, this book fairly rings with a sense of leave-taking that, despite what we know, imparts an oddly-faint feeling of surprised disbelief not unlike losing a distant relative you barely knew."
