= Worth the Fighting For =

Book by John McCain

- First edition
- Author: John McCain with Mark Salter
- Language: English
- Publisher: Random House
- Publication date: September 24, 2002
- Media type: Hardcover
- Pages: 396
- ISBN: 0-375-50542-3
- OCLC: 49529891
- Preceded by: Faith of My Fathers
- Followed by: Why Courage Matters: The Way to a Braver Life

Worth the Fighting For is a 2002 book by John McCain with Mark Salter. Published by Random House, it is part autobiography, part mini-biographies of others.

The book picks up where McCain's first memoir, Faith of My Fathers (1999), left off, with his return to the United States following his release as a prisoner of war in North Vietnam. The first part briefly covers the balance of his final years in the Navy until his 1981 retirement. The second part covers his congressional career in greater detail, first in the House of Representatives and later in the Senate. It concludes with his unsuccessful 2000 presidential campaign and some mentions of the September 11, 2001 attacks.

Interspersed with the autobiographical content are extended vignettes of various figures whom McCain had been inspired by, with treatments sometimes up to ten or more pages in length. These subjects range from historical presences such as Theodore Roosevelt, to more contemporaneous politicians such as Barry Goldwater, Scoop Jackson and Mo Udall, to people in other fields such as Billy Mitchell and Ted Williams. A few fictional creations, such as Marlon Brando's performance in Viva Zapata! and Robert Jordan, the protagonist of Ernest Hemingway's For Whom the Bell Tolls, are included as well.

Janet Maslin's review of Worth the Fighting For in The New York Times called the interspersed format "curious" and said there was a lot of McCain "shooting from the hip ... in this unpredictable, outspoken memoir." She noted that McCain's treatment of himself frequently adopted a "confessional, self-flagellating tone" and that McCain was wistfully frank about the ambition behind his failed presidential bid.

The book was not the commercial success Faith of My Fathers had been, but did appear on the New York Times Best Seller list for one week in October 2002. Royalties from the book were donated to charity.

Worth the Fighting For was published in paperback by Random House Trade Paperbacks on September 9, 2003 (ISBN 081296974X). This edition added a subtitle of sorts, The Education of an American Maverick, and the Heroes Who Inspired Him, as well as a new afterward from McCain in which he discussed developments of the year since original publication, including the early stages of the Iraq War.

The final volume of McCain's autobiographical trilogy is The Restless Wave, published in 2018.

== See also ==
- Character Is Destiny
