= Character Is Destiny =

2005 book by John McCain and Mark Salter

- Author: John McCain, Mark Salter
- Language: English
- Subject: Political convictions
- Publisher: Random House
- Publication date: 2005 (hardcover); 2006 (paperback)
- Publication place: United States
- Media type: Print (hardcover, paperback)
- ISBN: 1-4000-6412-0
- OCLC: 61253961
- Dewey Decimal: 170/.44 22
- LC Class: BJ1521 .M33 2005
- Preceded by: Why Courage Matters
- Followed by: Hard Call

Character Is Destiny: Inspiring Stories Every Young Person Should Know and Every Adult Should Remember is a 2005 book by United States Senator John McCain with Mark Salter. Published by Random House, it is a collection of biographies about individuals from the past and present who, in the authors' view, exemplify the best qualities of character. The book is divided into seven parts with further divisions of a characteristic and a person who is seen to exemplify it.

== Introductory notes ==
In McCain's words from the book's introduction:

It is your character, and your character alone, that will make your life happy or unhappy. That is all that really passes for destiny. And you choose it. No one else can give it to you or deny it to you. No rival can steal it from you. And no friend can give it to you. Others can encourage you to make the right choices or discourage you. But you choose.

== Sections ==
Each section provides examples of a specific characteristic, with essays on a well known person, historical or (then) living, whose life reflected a particular aspect of that characteristic.

=== Part One: Honor ===
- HONESTY — Thomas More
- RESPECT — Mohandas Karamchand Gandhi
- AUTHENTICITY — Joan of Arc
- LOYALTY — Sir Ernest Shackleton
- DIGNITY — Viktor Frankl

=== Part Two: Purpose ===
- IDEALISM — Sojourner Truth
- RIGHTEOUSNESS — Roméo Dallaire
- CITIZENSHIP — Pat Tillman
- DILIGENCE — Winston Churchill
- RESPONSIBILITY — Lord Nelson and His Lieutenants
- COOPERATION — John Wooden

=== Part Three: Strength ===
- COURAGE — Edith Cavell
- SELF-CONTROL — George Washington
- CONFIDENCE — Elizabeth I
- RESILIENCE — Abraham Lincoln
- INDUSTRY — Eric Hoffer
- HOPEFULNESS — John Winthrop

=== Part Four: Understanding ===
- FAITH — Christian Guard at Hua Lo Prison
- COMPASSION — Maximillian Kolbe
- MERCY — Mother Antonia
- TOLERANCE — The Four Chaplains
- FORGIVENESS — Nelson Mandela
- GENEROSITY — Oseola McCarty

=== Part Five: Judgment ===
- FAIRNESS — Dr. Martin Luther King Jr.
- HUMILITY — Dwight D. Eisenhower
- GRATITUDE — Tecumseh
- HUMOR — Mark Twain
- COURTESY — Aung San Suu Kyi

=== Part Six: Creativity ===
- ASPIRATION — Ferdinand Magellan
- DISCERNMENT — Leonardo da Vinci
- CURIOSITY — Charles Darwin
- ENTHUSIASM — Theodore Roosevelt
- EXCELLENCE — Wilma Rudolph

=== Part Seven: Love ===
- SELFLESSNESS AND CONTENTMENT — Mother Teresa

== Editions ==
- McCain, John. Character Is Destiny: Inspiring Stories Every Young Person Should Know and Every Adult Should Remember. New York: Random House, 2005. Print.
