= Mark Salter =

American speechwriter

Personal details
- Born: 1955 (age 70–71) Davenport, Iowa, U.S.
- Party: Republican
- Spouse: Diane
- Children: 2
- Education: Georgetown University (BA)

Mark Salter (born 1955) is an American speechwriter from Davenport, Iowa, known for his collaborations with United States Senator John McCain on several nonfiction books as well as on political speeches. Salter also served as McCain's chief of staff for a while, although he had left that position by 2008. Salter has often been referred to as McCain's "alter ego".

== Early life ==
Salter grew up in Davenport, Iowa. There he attended Roman Catholic parochial schools. Salter had a wandering upbringing and early adulthood, not settling down, working on railroad track maintenance in Iowa for four years and playing in a music group. Salter first entered politics as a speech writer for U.S. Ambassador to the UN Jeane Kirkpatrick. He later attended Georgetown University.

== Work with John McCain ==
Salter first began working for McCain following a chance encounter at the 1988 Republican National Convention.

During the John McCain presidential campaign, 2008 the Wall Street Journal wrote that "When it comes to Sen. McCain's image, Mr. Salter, 53 years old, is the campaign's chief creator, shaper and enforcer. For two decades, he has been the presumed Republican nominee's speechwriter, adviser and confidant." He almost left the campaign in mid-2007, when it suffered a collapse and there were many personnel shake-ups. During the latter stages of the campaign Salter frequently criticised media treatment of the candidate, which he said was consistently tilted in his rivals' favor.

Some observers have credited McCain's public servant persona as a literary project due to Salter's efforts.

Of their writing process, Salter said in 2008: "It's his voice, but I'm going inside his head to speak some psychological truth about him. I'm drawing a conclusion based on my observation of him. I always show him: 'This is what I've written. This is what I think about you. Is this fair?' " Observers of the two have likened their sharing to that of a Vulcan mind meld. During the 2008 presidential campaign, he was named by Politico as a possible pick for White House Chief of Staff, should John McCain win the election against Democratic candidate Barack Obama.

Howard Fineman wrote in a 2008 Newsweek article: "McCain and Salter are stylistically similar and share a world view: they like to operate in intimate settings, with a loyal band of brothers, a clear enemy in sight and an almost joyful fatalism in the face of long odds." He compared Salter's role to that of Boswell.

He was portrayed by actor Jamey Sheridan in the 2012 HBO production of Game Change for his role in the latter months of McCain's unsuccessful 2008 Presidential campaign.

Following the 2008 campaign loss, Salter became less of a presence in the McCain political operation.

== Published works ==
Aside from having worked on Senator McCain's staff for 19 years (as of 2008), Salter has also written, in collaboration with McCain, the books

- Thirteen Soldiers: A Personal History of Americans at War (2014)
- Why Courage Matters: The Way to a Braver Life (2004)
- Faith of My Fathers (1999)
- Worth the Fighting For (2002)
- Character Is Destiny: Inspiring Stories Every Young Person Should Know and Every Adult Should Remember (2005)
- Hard Call: Great Decisions and the Extraordinary People Who Made Them (2007)
- The Restless Wave: Good Times, Just Causes, Great Fights, and Other Appreciations (2018)

McCain has always given Salter front-cover credit for his writing work, and also splits income from the books with Salter evenly. That even split is a rarity in the political world, which often uses flat-rate ghostwriters, and allowed Salter and his wife—herself a former secretary on McCain's staff—to set up a second residence in Maine.

In 2011, Mark Halperin wrote in Time magazine that Salter was the author of the anonymously written 2011 book O: A Presidential Novel.

After McCain's death, Salter published a memoir of his time with McCain called The Luckiest Man: Life with John McCain (2020).

== Personal life ==
Salter lives in Alexandria, Virginia, with his wife Diane; they have two daughters.

In May 2016 Salter announced he would support Hillary Clinton in the 2016 United States presidential election, rather than presumptive Republican nominee Donald Trump.

In 2020, Salter and his wife endorsed McCain's vice presidential opponent Joe Biden for president.
