= Faith of My Fathers =

1999 non-fiction book by John McCain and Mark Salter

- First edition
- Author: John McCain with Mark Salter
- Language: English
- Publisher: Random House
- Publication date: August 1999
- Media type: Hardcover
- Pages: 349
- ISBN: 0-375-50191-6
- OCLC: 40776751
- Dewey Decimal: 973.9/092/2 B 21
- LC Class: E840.8.M467 A3 1999
- Followed by: Worth the Fighting For

Faith of My Fathers is a 1999 bestselling non-fiction book by United States Senator John McCain with Mark Salter. Published by Random House, it is part autobiography, part family memoir. It traces the story of McCain's life growing up, during his time in the United States Naval Academy, and his military service as a naval aviator before and during the Vietnam War. His story is interwoven with those of his father John S. "Jack" McCain, Jr. and his grandfather John S. "Slew" McCain, Sr., both four-star admirals in the Navy.

== History ==
McCain had rarely discussed his military experiences until the 1995 publication of Robert Timberg's The Nightingale's Song. After that book found critical praise, Timberg's literary agent tried to persuade McCain to write his own memoir on the subject; he was reluctant until she suggested he fold in the stories of his father and grandfather as well.

Publisher Random House paid McCain $500,000 for a two-book advance. Half went to McCain and half to Salter, McCain's longtime legislative aide. The book's themes were heavily influenced by McCain's literary tastes, such as Ernest Hemingway's For Whom the Bell Tolls, and its tone by Salter's gloomy view of human nature.

The book was released in late August 1999; during September, McCain went on a 15-city book tour, that dovetailed with campaign stops of his 2000 presidential campaign that would be formally announced later in the month.

The book was a commercial success, spending 24 weeks on the New York Times Best Seller list between September 1999 and March 2000, with a peak position of number two, and selling over 500,000 copies. Reviews of the book were almost all positive. McCain's royalties from the book were donated to charity.

The success of the book tour and the book's high number of sales led to it becoming a central part of the themes of McCain's 2000 presidential campaign, and represented a fundamental change in McCain using his Vietnam and prisoner experiences as a framing device for the narrative of his life.

The memoir was made into the 2005 television film Faith of My Fathers. McCain also wrote a sequel memoir, 2002's Worth the Fighting For, that covered his life after returning from Vietnam and as a politician. The final volume of McCain's autobiographical trilogy is The Restless Wave, published in 2018.

== Synopsis ==
Slew McCain commanded the aircraft carriers of Task Force 38 in the Pacific War in late 1944 and 1945, ultimately having 15 carriers and 8 battleships, plus their escorts, under his control for operations against Japan in July 1945. Jack McCain was a submariner in the U.S. Navy during the Pacific War, and later rose to four star rank and became Commander-in-Chief, Pacific Command (CINCPAC), commander of all U.S. forces in the Vietnam theater from 1968 to 1972. John McCain writes forthrightly of his rebellious and misspent youth, and his conflicts about following in his forefathers' steps.

The centerpiece of Faith of My Fathers is a lengthy account of McCain's five and half years as a prisoner of war in North Vietnamese camps, of the torturing and suffering he and his fellow prisoners endured, and the various kinds of faith that enabled him to carry on through the ordeal. It describes the injuries he sustained during his shoot-down and imprisonment, and the origin of why he cannot lift his arms above his shoulders. The book concludes with the release from captivity of him and the other POWs in 1973.

The following passage explains the book's title:

Glory belongs to the act of being constant to something greater than yourself, to a cause, to your principles. No misfortune, no injury, no humiliation can destroy it. This is the faith that my commanders affirmed, that my brothers-in-arms encouraged my allegiance to… It was my father and grandfather's faith. A filthy, broken man, all I had left of my dignity was the faith of my fathers. It was enough.

== See also ==
- Early life and military career of John McCain
- Character Is Destiny
- My Dad, John McCain
