= List of Gossip Girl episodes =

Gossip Girl is an American teen drama television series based on the young-adult book series of the same name written by Cecily von Ziegesar, and developed for television by The O.C. creators Josh Schwartz and Stephanie Savage. The series follows the lives of the young, wealthy, and social elite residing on the Upper East Side of Manhattan, and is narrated by an unseen and seemingly omniscient character, "Gossip Girl", whose blog is widely read among the characters.

A total of 121 episodes of Gossip Girl were aired over six seasons, between September 19, 2007, and December 17, 2012.

== Series overview ==
Season	Episodes	Originally released		Average viewership (in millions)
Season	Episodes	First released	Last released	Average viewership (in millions)
1	18	September 19, 2007	May 19, 2008	2.6
2	25	September 1, 2008	May 18, 2009	2.8
3	22	September 14, 2009	May 17, 2010	2.0
4	22	September 13, 2010	May 16, 2011	1.6
5	24	September 26, 2011	May 14, 2012	1.2
6	10	October 8, 2012	December 17, 2012	0.9

== Episodes ==
=== Season 1 (2007–08) ===
No. overall	No. in season	Title	Directed by	Written by	Original release date	Prod. code	U.S. viewers (millions)
1	1	"Pilot"	Mark Piznarski	Teleplay by : Josh Schwartz & Stephanie Savage	September 19, 2007	276026	3.50
2	2	"The Wild Brunch"	Mark Piznarski	Josh Schwartz & Stephanie Savage	September 26, 2007	3T6751	2.48
3	3	"Poison Ivy"	J. Miller Tobin	Felicia D. Henderson	October 3, 2007	3T6752	2.75
4	4	"Bad News Blair"	Patrick Norris	Joshua Safran	October 10, 2007	3T6753	2.80
5	5	"Dare Devil"	Jamie Babbit	Lenn K. Rosenfeld	October 17, 2007	3T6754	2.41
6	6	"The Handmaiden's Tale"	Norman Buckley	Jessica Queller	October 24, 2007	3T6755	2.54
7	7	"Victor, Victrola"	Tony Wharmby	K.J. Steinberg	November 7, 2007	3T6756	2.52
8	8	"Seventeen Candles"	Lee Shallat-Chemel	Story by : Felicia D. Henderson; Teleplay by : Joshua Safran & Felicia D. Henderson	November 14, 2007	3T6757	2.95
9	9	"Blair Waldorf Must Pie!"	Mark Piznarski	Story by : Lenn K. Rosenfeld; Teleplay by : Jessica Queller & K.J. Steinberg	November 28, 2007	3T6758	2.93
10	10	"Hi, Society"	Patrick Norris	Joshua Safran	December 5, 2007	3T6759	2.44
11	11	"Roman Holiday"	Michael Fields	Jessica Queller	December 19, 2007	3T6760	1.81
12	12	"School Lies"	Tony Wharmby	Lenn K. Rosenfeld	January 2, 2008	3T6761	2.19
13	13	"A Thin Line Between Chuck and Nate"	Norman Buckley	Felicia D. Henderson	January 9, 2008	3T6762	2.27
14	14	"The Blair Bitch Project"	J. Miller Tobin	K.J. Steinberg	April 21, 2008	3T6763	2.50
15	15	"Desperately Seeking Serena"	Michael Fields	Felicia D. Henderson	April 28, 2008	3T6764	2.53
16	16	"All About My Brother"	Janice Cooke	Paul Sciarrotta	May 5, 2008	3T6765	2.12
17	17	"Woman on the Verge"	Tony Wharmby	Joshua Safran	May 12, 2008	3T6766	2.71
18	18	"Much 'I Do' About Nothing"	Norman Buckley	Josh Schwartz & Stephanie Savage	May 19, 2008	3T6767	3.00

=== Season 2 (2008–09) ===
No. overall	No. in season	Title	Directed by	Written by	Original release date	U.S. viewers (millions)
19	1	"Summer, Kind of Wonderful"	J. Miller Tobin	Joshua Safran	September 1, 2008	3.43
20	2	"Never Been Marcused"	Michael Fields	Stephanie Savage	September 8, 2008	3.25
21	3	"The Dark Night"	Janice Cooke	John Stephens	September 15, 2008	3.73
22	4	"The Ex Files"	Jim McKay	Robert Hull	September 22, 2008	3.33
23	5	"The Serena Also Rises"	Patrick Norris	Jessica Queller	September 29, 2008	3.40
24	6	"New Haven Can Wait"	Norman Buckley	Alexandra McNally & Joshua Safran	October 13, 2008	3.31
25	7	"Chuck in Real Life"	Tony Wharmby	Lenn K. Rosenfeld	October 20, 2008	3.03
26	8	"Pret-a-Poor-J"	Vondie Curtis-Hall	Amanda Lasher	October 27, 2008	3.05
27	9	"There Might Be Blood"	Michael Fields	Etan Frankel & John Stephens	November 3, 2008	3.16
28	10	"Bonfire of the Vanity"	David Von Ancken	Jessica Queller	November 10, 2008	2.88
29	11	"The Magnificent Archibalds"	Jean de Segonzac	Joshua Safran	November 17, 2008	2.89
30	12	"It's a Wonderful Lie"	Patrick Norris	Robert Hull	December 1, 2008	3.11
31	13	"O Brother, Where Bart Thou?"	Joe Lazarov	Stephanie Savage	December 8, 2008	2.99
32	14	"In the Realm of the Basses"	Tony Wharmby	John Stephens	January 5, 2009	2.96
33	15	"Gone with the Will"	Tricia Brock	Amanda Lasher	January 12, 2009	2.85
34	16	"You've Got Yale!"	Janice Cooke	Joshua Safran	January 19, 2009	2.22
35	17	"Carrnal Knowledge"	Elizabeth Allen	Alexandra McNally & Lenn K. Rosenfeld	February 2, 2009	2.31
36	18	"The Age of Dissonance"	Norman Buckley	Jessica Queller	March 16, 2009	2.33
37	19	"The Grandfather"	J. Miller Tobin	Robert Hull & Etan Frankel	March 23, 2009	2.25
38	20	"Remains of the J"	Allison Liddi-Brown	Sarah Frank-Meltzer	March 30, 2009	2.45
39	21	"Seder Anything"	John Stephens	Amanda Lasher	April 20, 2009	2.37
40	22	"Southern Gentlemen Prefer Blondes"	Patrick Norris	Leila Gerstein	April 27, 2009	1.97
41	23	"The Wrath of Con"	Janice Cooke	Sara Goodman	May 4, 2009	2.22
42	24	"Valley Girls"	Mark Piznarski	Josh Schwartz & Stephanie Savage	May 11, 2009	2.30
43	25	"The Goodbye Gossip Girl"	Norman Buckley	Joshua Safran	May 18, 2009	2.23

=== Season 3 (2009–10) ===
No. overall	No. in season	Title	Directed by	Written by	Original release date	U.S. viewers (millions)
44	1	"Reversals of Fortune"	J. Miller Tobin	Joshua Safran	September 14, 2009	2.55
45	2	"The Freshman"	Norman Buckley	Amanda Lasher	September 21, 2009	1.97
46	3	"The Lost Boy"	Jean de Segonzac	Robert Hull	September 28, 2009	2.36
47	4	"Dan de Fleurette"	Mark Piznarski	John Stephens	October 5, 2009	2.08
48	5	"Rufus Getting Married"	Ron Fortunato	Leila Gerstein	October 12, 2009	2.36
49	6	"Enough About Eve"	John Stephens	Jake Coburn	October 19, 2009	1.98
50	7	"How to Succeed in Bassness"	Joe Lazarov	Sara Goodman	October 26, 2009	2.31
51	8	"The Grandfather: Part II"	Mark Piznarski	Lenn K. Rosenfeld	November 2, 2009	1.98
52	9	"They Shoot Humphreys, Don't They?"	Alison Maclean	Amanda Lasher	November 9, 2009	2.37
53	10	"The Last Days of Disco Stick"	Tony Wharmby	Leila Gerstein	November 16, 2009	2.24
54	11	"The Treasure of Serena Madre"	Mark Piznarski	Robert Hull & Joshua Safran	November 30, 2009	2.23
55	12	"The Debarted"	Jason Ensler	Stephanie Savage	December 7, 2009	2.21
56	13	"The Hurt Locket"	Tony Wharmby	Sara Goodman	March 8, 2010	1.74
57	14	"The Lady Vanished"	Andrew McCarthy	Amanda Lasher & Robert Hull	March 15, 2010	1.73
58	15	"The Sixteen Year Old Virgin"	Wendey Stanzler	Leila Gerstein	March 22, 2010	1.90
59	16	"The Empire Strikes Jack"	Joe Lazarov	Jake Coburn	March 29, 2010	1.69
60	17	"Inglourious Bassterds"	Jean de Segonzac	Lenn K. Rosenfeld	April 5, 2010	1.74
61	18	"The Unblairable Lightness of Being"	Janice Cooke-Leonard	Jeanne Leitenberg	April 12, 2010	1.86
62	19	"Dr. Estrangeloved"	Darnell Martin	Robert Hull	April 26, 2010	2.05
63	20	"It’s a Dad, Dad, Dad World"	Jeremiah Chechik	Amanda Lasher	May 3, 2010	1.74
64	21	"Ex-Husbands and Wives"	Norman Buckley	Sara Goodman	May 10, 2010	1.79
65	22	"Last Tango, Then Paris"	J. Miller Tobin	Joshua Safran & Stephanie Savage	May 17, 2010	1.96

=== Season 4 (2010–11) ===
No. overall	No. in season	Title	Directed by	Written by	Original release date	U.S. viewers (millions)
66	1	"Belles de Jour"	Mark Piznarski	Joshua Safran & Stephanie Savage	September 13, 2010	1.83
67	2	"Double Identity"	Mark Piznarski	Sara Goodman & Joshua Safran	September 20, 2010	1.84
68	3	"The Undergraduates"	Norman Buckley	Amanda Lasher	September 27, 2010	1.78
69	4	"Touch of Eva"	Andrew McCarthy	Leila Gerstein	October 4, 2010	2.00
70	5	"Goodbye, Columbia"	Jeremiah Chechik	Robert Hull	October 11, 2010	1.78
71	6	"Easy J"	Lee Shallat-Chemel	Jake Coburn	October 25, 2010	1.88
72	7	"War at the Roses"	Joe Lazarov	Jessica Queller	November 1, 2010	1.82
73	8	"Juliet Doesn't Live Here Anymore"	Patrick Norris	Jeanne Leitenberg	November 8, 2010	1.78
74	9	"The Witches of Bushwick"	Ron Fortunato	Sara Goodman	November 15, 2010	1.69
75	10	"Gaslit"	Tate Donovan	Robert Hull & Joshua Safran	November 29, 2010	1.96
76	11	"The Townie"	Joe Lazarov	Amanda Lasher & Stephanie Savage	December 6, 2010	2.06
77	12	"The Kids Are Not All Right"	Allan Kroeker	KJ Steinberg	January 24, 2011	1.58
78	13	"Damien Darko"	Jeremiah Chechik	Leila Gerstein	January 31, 2011	1.51
79	14	"Panic Roommate"	Andrew McCarthy	Jake Coburn	February 7, 2011	1.62
80	15	"It-Girl Happened One Night"	Bart Wenrich	Alex McNally	February 14, 2011	1.32
81	16	"While You Weren't Sleeping"	Norman Buckley	Sara Goodman	February 21, 2011	1.57
82	17	"Empire of the Son"	David Warren	Robert Hull	February 28, 2011	1.39
83	18	"The Kids Stay in the Picture"	J. Miller Tobin	Jessica Queller	April 18, 2011	1.43
84	19	"Petty in Pink"	Liz Friedlander	Amanda Lasher	April 25, 2011	1.55
85	20	"The Princesses and the Frog"	Andrew McCarthy	Leila Gerstein	May 2, 2011	1.27
86	21	"Shattered Bass"	Allison Liddi-Brown	Sara Goodman	May 9, 2011	1.20
87	22	"The Wrong Goodbye"	Patrick Norris	Joshua Safran	May 16, 2011	1.36

=== Season 5 (2011–12) ===
No. overall	No. in season	Title	Directed by	Written by	Original release date	U.S. viewers (millions)
88	1	"Yes, Then Zero"	Mark Piznarski	Joshua Safran	September 26, 2011	1.37
89	2	"Beauty and the Feast"	Mark Piznarski	Sara Goodman	October 3, 2011	1.34
90	3	"The Jewel of Denial"	Larry Shaw	Amanda Lasher	October 10, 2011	1.27
91	4	"Memoirs of an Invisible Dan"	Tate Donovan	Amy B. Harris	October 17, 2011	1.16
92	5	"The Fasting and the Furious"	Joe Lazarov	Peter Elkoff	October 24, 2011	1.36
93	6	"I Am Number Nine"	Andy Wolk	Jake Coburn	November 7, 2011	1.26
94	7	"The Big Sleep No More"	Vince Misiano	Dan Steele	November 14, 2011	1.24
95	8	"All the Pretty Sources"	Cherie Nowlan	Austin Winsberg	November 21, 2011	1.35
96	9	"Rhodes to Perdition"	Andrew McCarthy	Natalie Krinsky	November 28, 2011	1.32
97	10	"Riding in Town Cars with Boys"	Vince Misiano	Amanda Lasher	December 5, 2011	1.28
98	11	"The End of the Affair?"	Michael Grossman	Sara Goodman	January 16, 2012	1.29
99	12	"Father and the Bride"	Amy Heckerling	Peter Elkoff	January 23, 2012	1.11
100	13	"G.G."	Mark Piznarski	Joshua Safran	January 30, 2012	1.39
101	14	"The Backup Dan"	David Warren	Matt Whitney	February 6, 2012	1.25
102	15	"Crazy, Cupid, Love"	Matt Penn	Austin Winsberg	February 13, 2012	1.13
103	16	"Cross Rhodes"	John Terlesky	Amy B. Harris	February 20, 2012	1.00
104	17	"The Princess Dowry"	Andrew McCarthy	Jake Coburn	February 27, 2012	1.11
105	18	"Con Heir"	Joe Lazarov	Annemarie Navar-Gill	April 2, 2012	0.97
106	19	"It Girl, Interrupted"	Omar Madha	Amanda Lasher	April 9, 2012	0.98
107	20	"Salon of the Dead"	Norman Buckley	Natalie Krinsky	April 16, 2012	1.06
108	21	"Despicable B"	David Warren	Austin Winsberg	April 23, 2012	0.99
109	22	"Raiders of the Lost Art"	Bart Wenrich	Jake Coburn	April 30, 2012	1.02
110	23	"The Fugitives"	Andy Wolk	Matt Whitney	May 7, 2012	0.83
111	24	"The Return of the Ring"	J. Miller Tobin	Sara Goodman	May 14, 2012	1.14

=== Season 6 (2012) ===
No. overall	No. in season	Title	Directed by	Written by	Original release date	U.S. viewers (millions)
112	1	"Gone Maybe Gone"	Mark Piznarski	Josh Schwartz & Stephanie Savage	October 8, 2012	0.78
113	2	"High Infidelity"	Joe Lazarov	Annemarie Navar-Gill	October 15, 2012	0.78
114	3	"Dirty Rotten Scandals"	Bart Wenrich	Natalie Krinsky	October 22, 2012	0.95
115	4	"Portrait of a Lady Alexander"	Andy Wolk	Matt Whitney	November 5, 2012	0.66
116	5	"Monstrous Ball"	Amy Heckerling	Sara Goodman	November 12, 2012	0.73
117	6	"Where the Vile Things Are"	Norman Buckley	Dan Steele	November 19, 2012	0.72
118	7	"Save the Last Chance"	Anna Mastro	Jessica Queller	November 26, 2012	0.84
119	8	"It's Really Complicated"	John Stephens	Jake Coburn	December 3, 2012	0.79
120	9	"The Revengers"	Patrick Norris	Sara Goodman & Natalie Krinsky	December 10, 2012	1.06
121	10	"New York, I Love You XOXO"	Mark Piznarski	Stephanie Savage	December 17, 2012	1.55

=== Specials ===
One special episode, not part of the official continuity, was produced to complement the first season and was broadcast on The CW on January 28, 2008. A retrospective of the entire series aired on December 17, 2012, before the series finale.

Special no.	Title	Directed by	Original air date	Production code	U.S. viewers (in millions)
1	"Gossip Girl: Revealed"	Stephanie Savage	January 28, 2008	S01	1.72
2	"Gossip Girl: XOXO"	Stephanie Savage	December 17, 2012	S06	1.28

== Ratings ==
Gossip Girl : U.S. viewers per episode (millions)

Season	Episode number																									Average
Season	1	2	3	4	5	6	7	8	9	10	11	12	13	14	15	16	17	18	19	20	21	22	23	24	25	Average
1	3.50	2.48	2.75	2.80	2.41	2.54	2.52	2.95	2.93	2.44	1.81	2.19	2.27	2.50	2.53	2.12	2.71	3.00	–							2.58
2	3.43	3.25	3.73	3.33	3.40	3.31	3.03	3.05	3.16	2.88	2.89	3.11	2.99	2.96	2.85	2.22	2.31	2.33	2.25	2.45	2.37	1.97	2.22	2.30	2.23	2.80
3	2.55	1.97	2.36	2.08	2.36	1.98	2.31	1.98	2.37	2.24	2.23	2.21	1.74	1.73	1.90	1.69	1.74	1.86	2.05	1.74	1.79	1.96	–			2.04
4	1.83	1.84	1.78	2.00	1.78	1.88	1.82	1.78	1.69	1.96	2.06	1.58	1.51	1.62	1.32	1.57	1.39	1.43	1.55	1.27	1.20	1.36	–			1.65
5	1.37	1.34	1.27	1.16	1.36	1.26	1.24	1.35	1.32	1.28	1.29	1.11	1.39	1.25	1.13	1.00	1.11	0.97	0.98	1.06	0.99	1.02	0.83	1.14	–	1.18
6	0.78	0.78	0.95	0.66	0.73	0.72	0.84	0.79	1.06	1.55	–															0.89

Audience measurement performed by Nielsen Media Research

== Webisodes ==
=== Chasing Dorota ===
The CW aired six mini-webisodes centering on Dorota, the Waldorf's housekeeper.

No. in series	No. in season	Title	Directed by	Written by	Original air date
1	1	"Episode 1"	Bart Wenrich	Jeanne Leitenberg	April 20, 2009
2	2	"Episode 2"	Bart Wenrich	Jeanne Leitenberg	April 20, 2009
3	3	"Episode 3"	Bart Wenrich	Jeanne Leitenberg	April 20, 2009
4	4	"Episode 4"	Bart Wenrich	Jeanne Leitenberg	April 20, 2009
5	5	"Episode 5"	Bart Wenrich	Jeanne Leitenberg	April 20, 2009
6	6	"Episode 6"	Bart Wenrich	Jeanne Leitenberg	April 20, 2009
