= Gossip Girl season 4 =

Season of television series

Gossip Girl
- Season 4
- DVD cover art
- Showrunner: Joshua Safran
- Starring: Blake Lively; Leighton Meester; Penn Badgley; Chace Crawford; Taylor Momsen; Ed Westwick; Jessica Szohr; Kelly Rutherford; Matthew Settle
- No. of episodes: 22

Release
- Original network: The CW
- Original release: September 13, 2010 – May 16, 2011

Season chronology
- ← Previous; Season 3 Next → Season 5

The fourth season of the American teen drama television series Gossip Girl premiered on The CW on September 13, 2010, and concluded on May 16, 2011, consisting of 22 episodes. Based on the novel series of the same name by Cecily von Ziegesar, the series was developed for television by Josh Schwartz and Stephanie Savage. The CW renewed the series for a full fourth season on February 16, 2010. Blake Lively, Leighton Meester, Penn Badgley, Chace Crawford, Taylor Momsen, Ed Westwick, Jessica Szohr, Kelly Rutherford, and Matthew Settle all return as series regulars.

It was later announced that the show would stay in its Monday 9:00 p.m. timeslot as a lead-out to 90210. The season premiered on September 13, 2010, to a 1.0 Adults 18–49 rating and 1.84 million viewers. The fourth episode achieved a 1.1 Adults 18–49 rating, the season's highest-rated episode, while episode 11 was the most watched with 2.06 million viewers tuning in. The season concluded on May 16, 2011, with 1.36 million live viewers tuning in. On Metacritic, the season has a 75 out of 100 rating, indicating generally positive reviews by critics.

== Synopsis ==
Blair Waldorf and Chuck Bass try to end their on/off again relationship, but their plans are thrown for a loop when new international love interests for both come into the picture. Dan Humphrey becomes a father when Georgina Sparks leaves her son Milo with him. Blair and Serena van der Woodsen begin attending Columbia University but face challenges at their new school. Nate Archibald begins dating Juliet Sharp, who has a mysterious vendetta against Serena and Lily van der Woodsen. Lily tries to sell Bass Industries, but the Bass family is in for a surprise when an old enemy, Russell Thorpe and his daughter Raina come to town. Serena gets in legal trouble for something Lily did years earlier. After keeping it secret for so long, Lily serves a house arrest sentence for forging Serena's signature on a legal document. Serena and her brother Eric's secret cousin, Charlie Rhodes, comes to Manhattan, but is she who she says she is? Blair becomes engaged to Prince Louis Grimaldi and is on the fast track to achieving her ultimate goal: becoming a princess.

== Cast and characters ==
=== Main ===
- Blake Lively as Serena van der Woodsen
- Leighton Meester as Blair Waldorf
- Penn Badgley as Dan Humphrey
- Chace Crawford as Nate Archibald
- Taylor Momsen as Jenny Humphrey
- Ed Westwick as Chuck Bass
- Jessica Szohr as Vanessa Abrams
- Kelly Rutherford as Lily van der Woodsen
- Matthew Settle as Rufus Humphrey
- Kristen Bell as the voice of Gossip Girl (uncredited)

=== Recurring ===
- Hugo Becker as Prince Louis Grimaldi
- Katie Cassidy as Juliet Sharp
- Margaret Colin as Eleanor Waldorf
- Clémence Poésy as Eva Coupeau
- Michelle Trachtenberg as Georgina Sparks
- David Call as Ben Donovan
- Connor Paolo as Eric van der Woodsen
- Amanda Setton as Penelope Shafai
- Zuzanna Szadkowski as Dorota Kishlovsky
- Alice Callahan as Jessica Leitenberg
- Sam Page as Colin Forrester
- Sam Robards as Howard Archibald
- Aaron Schwartz as Vanya
- Francie Swift as Anne Archibald
- Kevin Zegers as Damien Dalgaard
- Michael Boatman as Russell Thorpe
- Tika Sumpter as Raina Thorpe
- William Baldwin as William van der Woodsen
- Kaylee DeFer as Ivy Dickens/Charlie Rhodes
- Nicole Fiscella as Isabel Coates
- Nan Zhang as Kati Farkas
- Melissa Fumero as Zoe

=== Guest ===
- Lou Doillon as herself
- Jayne Atkinson as Dean Reuther
- Marlyne Barrett as Martha Chamberlain
- Tim Gunn as himself
- Robyn as herself
- Luke Kleintank as Elliot Garfield
- Caitlin FitzGerald as Epperly Lawrence
- Florence and the Machine as themselves
- Sheila Kelley as Carol Rhodes
- Caroline Lagerfelt as CeCe Rhodes
- Joanne Whalley as Princess Sophie Grimaldi
- Desmond Harrington as Jack Bass
- Wallace Shawn as Cyrus Rose
- Jan Maxwell as Headmistress Queller

== Episodes ==
No. overall	No. in season	Title	Directed by	Written by	Original release date	U.S. viewers (millions)
66	1	"Belles de Jour"	Mark Piznarski	Joshua Safran & Stephanie Savage	September 13, 2010	1.83
While spending the summer in Paris, Serena and Blair try their best to forget their exes by going out with men of royalty. After getting shot in Prague, Chuck meets a French tourist who does not know his real identity. Meanwhile, back in New York, Eleanor helps Lily make arrangements for the Fashion's Night Out gathering at the van der Woodsen penthouse. Dan deals with raising Georgina's newborn son Milo, while Nate meets a potential new love interest, Juliet Sharp. Karlie Kloss makes a cameo appearance. Title reference: The 1967 film Belle de Jour.
67	2	"Double Identity"	Mark Piznarski	Sara Goodman & Joshua Safran	September 20, 2010	1.84
On their last day in Paris, Serena and Blair run into a different Chuck. Back in New York, Juliet decides to butt into the Nate/Dan/Serena love triangle. Dan and Vanessa learns a secret about Milo. Serena tries to get Blair to persuade Chuck to move back to Manhattan. Title reference: The 2009 film of the same name.
68	3	"The Undergraduates"	Norman Buckley	Amanda Lasher	September 27, 2010	1.78
Serena and Blair try to join a prestigious sorority, but are thrown for a loop when they learn Juliet is the head of the house. Returning from St. Barts, Georgina finally comes clean about Milo. Not ready to face what he did last spring and in his high school past, Chuck is hesitant about introducing Eva to Lily, Rufus, and Eric. Title reference: The 1995 film The Underneath.
69	4	"Touch of Eva"	Andrew McCarthy	Leila Gerstein	October 4, 2010	2.00
Nate feels that Juliet is hiding something from him after a Gossip Girl blast finds her in upstate New York. Meanwhile, Blair finds a bombshell about Eva, but it also ignites a war between Chuck and Blair. After losing Milo, Dan finds himself torn between his feelings for Serena and Vanessa. Title reference: The 1958 film Touch of Evil.
70	5	"Goodbye, Columbia"	Jeremiah Chechik	Robert Hull	October 11, 2010	1.78
A vicious rumor spread by Juliet damages Serena's new "clean" slate. Desperate to see if Dan is hiding something from her, Vanessa steals Serena's phone. Elsewhere, Chuck threatens Blair's chances to become the new assistant to powerful businesswoman Martha Chamberlain (Marlyne Barrett). Title reference: The 2003 film Goodbye, Lenin.
71	6	"Easy J"	Lee Shallat-Chemel	Jake Coburn	October 25, 2010	1.88
After learning Jenny is back in the city, Blair does everything in her power to have her sent back to Hudson, but she doesn't know that Little J has a trick up her sleeve. Meanwhile, Serena learns that Colin (Sam Page) is actually her college professor, which puts their relationship in grave danger. Title reference: The 2010 film Easy A.
72	7	"War at the Roses"	Joe Lazarov	Jessica Queller	November 1, 2010	1.82
Fearing that their vindictive games will get worst, Nate and Serena try to get a peace treaty between the warring exes for Blair's 20th birthday. Dan comes up with a scheme that will allow Jenny to return to the Upper East Side to celebrate Rufus and Lily's anniversary celebration, but his plan ultimately backfires. Serena and Colin try to resist their desires for each other. Swedish singer Robyn makes a cameo performing an acoustic version of "Hang with Me" at Blair's birthday party celebration. Title reference: The 1989 film The War of the Roses.
73	8	"Juliet Doesn't Live Here Anymore"	Patrick Norris	Jeanne Leitenberg	November 8, 2010	1.78
Serena continues to resist temptation with her professor Colin, while Blair tries to resist temptation with Chuck. Vanessa joins Juliet's scheme to try to bring down Serena, and contacts an old friend to join in. Nate discovers who Juliet truly is. Dan realizes that he still has feelings for Serena. Title reference: The 1974 film Alice Doesn't Live Here Anymore.
74	9	"The Witches of Bushwick"	Ron Fortunato	Sara Goodman	November 15, 2010	1.69
Serena learns that she has until the end of Chuck's Saints & Sinners Masquerade Ball to choose between Dan or Nate. Jenny joins forces with Juliet and Vanessa to take down Serena. Meanwhile, Blair sets her sights on becoming the new face of Anne Archibald's Foundation for Girls, but her relationship with Chuck may hinder her acceptance. Title reference: The 1987 film The Witches of Eastwick.
75	10	"Gaslit"	Tate Donovan	Robert Hull & Joshua Safran	November 29, 2010	1.96
Lily, Rufus, Eric, Blair, Dan, and Chuck find themselves at the hospital because of Serena’s apparent drug overdose. Meanwhile, Nate attempts to help his parents put the past behind them and reconcile. After successfully clearing her agenda, Juliet makes a departure from New York City, as well as Vanessa, in fear of potential vengeance from Blair. Jenny discovers Juliet's true intentions towards Serena and gives Blair information that will help her take down Juliet. Title reference: The 1944 film Gaslight.
76	11	"The Townie"	Joe Lazarov	Amanda Lasher & Stephanie Savage	December 6, 2010	2.06
Blair and Dan team up with an old enemy to find Juliet in Cornwall, Connecticut through a tip from Gossip Girl, and uncovers a bombshell about Serena's sophomore year at Boarding school. Meanwhile, after 2 years in prison, the Archibald family gets some good news regarding The Captain. Also, Rufus and Chuck learn Lily is planning to sell Bass Industries. Title reference: The 2010 film The Town.
77	12	"The Kids Are Not All Right"	Allan Kroeker	KJ Steinberg	January 24, 2011	1.58
A former associate of Chuck's late father, Russell Thorpe, along with his crafty and headstrong daughter Raina, return to Manhattan with some unfinished business concerning Bass Industries. Serena and Chuck unite against Lily. Meanwhile, Blair realizes that her mother, Eleanor, may be her key to becoming a future CEO. Nate worries that his father, The Captain, is having a little too much fun after his release from prison and is not taking his parole seriously. Title reference: The 2010 film The Kids Are All Right.
78	13	"Damien Darko"	Jeremiah Chechik	Leila Gerstein	January 31, 2011	1.51
Blair is thrilled to get an internship at W magazine to further claw her way up the ranks to become a CEO, but her excitement fades when she discovers that five other students, including someone she knows, also secured a coveted spot in the prestigious magazine. Meanwhile, Chuck may have finally met his match with Russell Thorpe and his daughter Raina, when they announce that they are planning to take over Bass Industries. Serena attempts a reconciliation with Ben after his release from prison. Eric engages in suspicious behavior with Damien, who returns to New York. Nate receives alarming news about his father's business prospects when he learns that the Captain and Russell are working together for some nefarious purpose. Title reference: The 2001 film Donnie Darko.
79	14	"Panic Roommate"	Andrew McCarthy	Jake Coburn	February 7, 2011	1.62
Blair enlists Nate's help to win over her high-strung boss, Epperly, at W magazine. Meanwhile, trying to get back at Ben for what happened in boarding school, Damien pits Serena and Eric against each other. Chuck finds himself torn between business and pleasure with Raina. English band Florence and the Machine performs an acoustic version of "Cosmic Love". Title reference: The 2002 film Panic Room.
80	15	"It-Girl Happened One Night"	Bart Wenrich	Alex McNally	February 14, 2011	1.32
As Russell Thorpe is prepared to take over Bass Industries, Chuck makes one last attempt to save his father's company by throwing a Valentine's Day fundraiser, and tries to cut Lily loose from Bass Industries and his life. Meanwhile, at W magazine, a difficult assignment gives Blair the opportunity for a promotion. Elsewhere, Serena struggles with her feelings for Ben against her family's disapproval. Title reference: The 1934 film It Happened One Night.
81	16	"While You Weren't Sleeping"	Norman Buckley	Sara Goodman	February 21, 2011	1.57
Eric's 18th birthday arrives, along with a drama-filled celebration. Knowing about the forged affidavit, Damien blackmails Eric. An impatient Blair decides to speed up the timetable to jump-start her career, but ultimately stretches herself too thin. Meanwhile, Serena is forced to choose between her family or Ben. Chuck and Lily reconcile and team up in order to save Bass Industries from Russell Thorpe. After being gone for 3 months, Vanessa returns to apologize to Dan. Title reference: The 1995 film While You Were Sleeping.
82	17	"Empire of the Son"	David Warren	Robert Hull	February 28, 2011	1.39
Unresolved issues between Ben and Serena come to light when his mother visits. Meanwhile, Russell puts his relationship with Raina at risk by using personal information to blackmail Lily in order to destroy Chuck's family legacy. Blair and Dan's relationship continues to build. Nate and Raina explore their feelings for each other. Lily prepares to face legal consequences for her part in Ben's false imprisonment. William van der Woodsen makes his return to the Upper East Side. Title reference: The 1987 film Empire of the Sun.
83	18	"The Kids Stay in the Picture"	J. Miller Tobin	Jessica Queller	April 18, 2011	1.43
William, along with Lily's mother and sister, CeCe and Carol (Sheila Kelley), come to New York to support Lily as she awaits sentencing for confessing to her crime. As the family reunion goes underway, it's discovered that Serena and Eric have a cousin who they didn't know about. Meanwhile, Blair and Dan deal with the aftermath of their kiss as Chuck realizes that he wants to win Blair back. Title reference: The 1994 film The Kid Stays in the Picture.
84	19	"Petty in Pink"	Liz Friedlander	Amanda Lasher	April 25, 2011	1.55
Suspicious, Serena sends Charlie to spy on Blair and Dan as they begin to spend more time together. Blair is reunited with Prince Louis Grimaldi (Hugo Becker), whom she met in Paris. Meanwhile, Nate helps Raina find out what happened to her mother, while Chuck's hopes about his legacy are crushed with the reveal of devastating information from the past. Rufus and Eric try to cheer up Lily by having Lily's annual breast cancer awareness fundraising party be held at the penthouse. Title reference: The 1986 film Pretty in Pink.
85	20	"The Princesses and the Frog"	Andrew McCarthy	Leila Gerstein	May 2, 2011	1.27
A jealous Serena attempts to use information from Blair's past to threaten her newfound happiness with Prince Louis whose parents disapprove of Blair. After discovering a shocking secret, Nate is torn between his relationship with Raina and his friendship with Chuck. A questionable friendship arises between Serena and Vanessa. Title reference: The 2009 film The Princess and the Frog.
86	21	"Shattered Bass"	Allison Liddi-Brown	Sara Goodman	May 9, 2011	1.20
Chuck and Jack team up to take Russell Thorpe down for good. Blair tries to impress Louis’ family, but it backfires. Charlie's web of secrets begin to unravel. Title reference: The 2003 film Shattered Glass.
87	22	"The Wrong Goodbye"	Patrick Norris	Joshua Safran	May 16, 2011	1.36
After being exposed as his wife's killer, Russell decides to take something precious of Chuck's, which leads to a tense standoff. Old friends and foes return to New York and are looking to get into trouble. After learning Charlie's secret, Serena and Vanessa join forces to find Charlie before it's too late, however, little do they know that Charlie has one more trick up her sleeve. As the summer approaches, someone receives life altering news. Title reference: The 1973 The Long Goodbyefilm The Long Goodbye.

== Production ==
The series was renewed for a fourth season on February 16, 2010. It continued to air Mondays at 9/8c following 90210, and premiered on September 13, 2010.

Blake Lively, Leighton Meester, Ed Westwick, and Clémence Poésy began filming this season in Paris on July 5, 2010. It was announced that Jessica Szohr would be absent for an unspecified number of episodes. However, Szohr began filming on July 9, 2010, the first day of production in New York City along with Penn Badgley, which indicated she would be back sooner than anticipated. Szohr appeared in the season premiere. Taylor Momsen began filming her scenes on August 30, 2010. Taylor Momsen appears in one episode titled "Easy J" which aired October 25, 2010, and will return in full series regular status for the second half of the season. It had also been confirmed that Tate Donovan, who previously worked with show's developers Josh Schwartz and Stephanie Savage in The O.C., would be directing an episode scheduled to air in November 2010.

The first two episodes of the season take place in Paris.

The Airborne Toxic Event made a special appearance during the season 4 finale "The Wrong Goodbye" as the band for the Constance Billard Alumni party, playing the song "Changing" from their second album, All at Once.

=== Cast ===
I can't say that I've actually watched Gossip Girl a lot. A guy who works with me watches it a lot, and he said: "Yes! You have to do it. It's really good." So I checked a little bit with people I know to see what they thought about it, but I thought it would be a good opportunity to showcase the music. I'm happy for any kind of way of doing that at the moment.

— Robyn on her acceptance of the Gossip Girl guest spot.

Harry Potter actress Clémence Poésy joined the cast in Paris as Chuck's new girlfriend, Eva, for four episodes.

Former Melrose Place star Katie Cassidy joined the cast as Juliet, a student at Columbia University and a potential love interest for Nate, with an agenda against Serena, together with David Call as Ben Donovan, Juliet's imprisoned brother. Actor Sam Page was cast as Serena's new love interest, a Columbia business professor and Juliet and Ben's cousin, for a four-episode arc. Kevin Zegers returned to the show as Damien Dalgaard, appearing in five episodes. Desmond Harrington also returned as Chuck's uncle, Jack Bass. Taylor Momsen was absent for several episodes at the beginning of the season due to her touring commitments with the Pretty Reckless, but returned near the end of the first half of the season. She was then scheduled for an indefinite hiatus from the show and only appeared in four episodes of the season. Michael Boatman and Tika Sumpter guest-starred in episodes airing in 2011. Boatman played Russell Thorpe, a powerful business tycoon and a former associate of Chuck's father, Bart, while Sumpter portrayed his daughter, Raina.

Tim Gunn and fashion designers Diane Von Furstenberg and Rachel Zoe all made special cameo appearances during the first half of the season. Singer Robyn also made a cameo appearance performing her song "Hang with Me".

William Baldwin admitted he would like to return for the fourth season. He said he would return in the same capacity of Michelle Trachtenberg to come in cause some trouble then leave again. The CW announced in December 2010 that Baldwin would return in February 2011. Sheila Kelley replaced Illeana Douglas as Lily's sister, Carol, after Douglas was forced to drop out of the project due to scheduling conflicts. Michelle Trachtenberg returned to the series as Georgina Sparks in the season finale. Kaylee DeFer also joined the cast as Carol's daughter and Serena and Eric's cousin, Charlie Rhodes. DeFer had originally auditioned for the role of Raina. DeFer's contract with the show also included the possibility of her becoming a series regular next season. DeFer was officially promoted to series regular starting in season 5.

Hugo Becker, who played Prince Louis Grimaldi, returned on April 18, 2011, for the rest of the season. The Borgias actress Joanne Whalley had been cast in an episode of Gossip Girl following a Screen Actors Guild casting notice. Whalley was rumoured to play an adversarial role to Kelly Rutherford's Lily van der Woodsen, but turned out to be that of Princess Sophie, Louis Grimaldi's mother.

Academy Award-nominated director David O. Russell made a cameo. On April 6, 2011, it was reported that 10 Things I Hate About You star Ethan Peck had landed a role in the show. Both stars were seen filming with Lively in California. Peck would reportedly make his debut in the season finale and was in talks with producers for a recurring role for the fifth season. Recurring cast members Nan Zhang and Nicole Fiscella reprised their roles as Kati Farkas and Isabel Coates for the penultimate episode and the season finale. Zhang had left the show during the first season and Fiscella finished her stint as a recurring cast member during the second season of the show. Tony Award-winning actress Jan Maxwell reprised her role as Headmistress Queller for the season finale. Becker remained ambiguous on whether he would be joining the series as a recurring or regular cast member during an interview with Zap2it, stating "the answer is in the finale." On May 16, 2011, Entertainment Weekly announced that Gossip Girl author Cecily von Ziegesar would be making a cameo for the season finale.

=== Plot ===
I didn't actually read that into it until I actually saw it on TV and how they set it up. I can see why people would think that.

— Katie Cassidy on fans thinking she was Gossip Girl.

Season four begins with Serena and Blair enjoying their summer in Paris, until the unexpected appearance of Chuck Bass, who is using a false name and cozying up to a new girl. Blair has to decide if she wants to fight for Chuck or spend her energy trying to rule Columbia University. Serena needs to choose between Nate and Dan, but Dan is a bit busy coping with his new role as "dad" to Georgina's baby. Georgina later reveals the baby is not his. Stephanie Savage revealed in an interview that the Dan and Serena story is "reactivated" and sorting through it will become a bigger story. She also revealed that the third-season finale "Last Tango, Then Paris" had a big impact on Jenny and she would be a changed person when she returns. Her return later this season would be "full of drama".

The Gossip Girl website was under construction when Serena and Blair returned from Paris and debuted "never before seen technology" when it returned. It is revealed that Juliet is working with her brother to take down Serena, for unknown reasons. Vanessa gets caught in the middle when Juliet sets her up for stealing Serena's phone and sending an incriminating email. Vanessa later leaves town when only Dan believes her, but tells Juliet to watch her back. After Blair ran Chuck's new girlfriend out of town, he pledges war against her. They later decide that it is best for both of them if they end their fighting after Jenny posts on Gossip Girl the reason why she left town. In the next episode, at Blair's 20th birthday party they kiss and have sex. Both Nate and Dan still have feelings for Serena, but do not know what to make of her mixed signals.

Most of Juliet's plan is revealed by the end of the first half of the season, with some elements set to carry over. Juliet also recruits two main characters to help take Serena down. Blair and Dan team up to help Serena. The two characters who joined Juliet were Vanessa and Jenny. The three manage to turn everyone against Serena when Juliet and Jenny dress up as her at a masquerade party. Juliet takes photos of herself with cocaine and drugs Serena, causing Lily to believe Serena had gone off the rails again and has her committed to the Ostroff center. Jenny, feeling guilty about what they have done, reveals everything to Blair. Vanessa leaves town to avoid Blair, while Blair and Dan form an alliance to seek revenge on Juliet. After they track her down, Juliet goes to Serena and explains everything to her. It is revealed in a confrontation with Lily that Juliet's brother Ben was Serena's former teacher at her boarding school in Connecticut, who was accused of having an affair with Serena. Lily forged Serena's signature on the police affidavit, which in Lily's plan, would allow Serena to return home and, inadvertently, had sent Ben to prison. Serena then hatches a plan to help free Ben from prison. This involves proving that her mother forged the affidavit against Ben. Chuck also learns that Lily was planning to sell Bass Industries behind his back.

== Reception ==
The season opened to a 1.0 Adults 18–49 rating and 1.84 million viewers. The fourth episode initially hit season highs in all categories with a 2.8 Women 18-34 rating, 1.1 Adults 18–49, a 1.7 in Adults 18-34 and 2.00 million viewers, until the airing of the eleventh episode hit a season high in viewers 2.06 million. The series has larger increases in the adults 18–49 on the Live + 7 DVR Ratings. The 4th episode had an 18–49 rating of 1.1, which was later increased to a 1.5 rating. The 5th episode had an 18–49 rating of 0.9, which later rose up to 1.3, which is 44% of increase.

"Gossip Girl gets by just fine on scandal, secrets, and convoluted plots, but the times where the show most fully escapes guilty-pleasure territory are when it explores compelling, complex relationships."

— Erik Adams assessing relationships in the show.

The season premiered to generally favorable reviews from critics. Steve Marsi of TV Fanatic gave the episode 4.5 stars out of 5.0 and praised Michelle Trachtenberg's and guest star Katie Cassidy's acting and storylines. Mark O. Estes, from TV Overmind, also enjoyed the fact that the episode had "explored more adult themes than usual." Gerard McGarry, from Unreality Shout, said that the season premiere was "brilliant", while Alexis James-blackhead, from Buzz Focus, said that the episode was "less sizzle than fizzle." Leighton Meester and Ed Westwick's performance was praised during the next episode "Chuck Bass" was also a trending topic on Twitter on the night the episode aired. The season has a 75/100 score of Metacritic, indicating mostly positive reviews.

Erik Adams from The A.V. Club reviewed the direction of the fourth season following the fourth-season premiere. "By the time a television show reaches its fourth season, the characteristics of its main ensemble ought to be deeply entrenched and immediately recognizable to regular viewers. But on the occasion of Gossip Girl's fourth season première, the ongoing teen soap—and its characters—are allowed some reinvention. The CW's flagship franchise is in a precarious position: it's a show that's both out of time and losing its sizzle." Adams cited the show's expensive art direction despite the economic woes outside of the show and the doubtful following of the Gossip Girl world considering the rise of micro-blogging in celebrity culture. Adams praised the development of Blair and Serena's relationship, declaring their friendship as "the great, central romance of Gossip Girl."

Brian Cantor of Headline Planet expressed disappointment with the show's performance for the season premiere, stating "[Gossip Girl] considerably [has] less critical interest and buzz than there had been for past seasons; the show no longer even has the 'pop culture phenomenon' claim to soften the blow of ratings releases." Judy Berman of the Los Angeles Times in contrast, defended the show's creative form during the midseason finale "The Townie", stating, "Whenever I start to think that the show has run out of material [...] it unleashes a showstopping hour of sparkly melodrama that reminds me of why I'm still watching." With the airing of the season finale TV Fanatic's Steve Marsi assessed the fourth season stating that "it's not a stretch to say the past season was uneven at best, lacking some of the continuity, humor and drama of the past. It's hard to put one's finger on in a sense, since many episodes were enjoyable. But there was a certain OMG-can-you-believe-this-happened factor that just wasn't there."

== DVD release ==
Gossip Girl: The Complete Fourth Season
Set Details		Special Features
22 Episodes; 5-Disc Set; English (Dolby Surround 5.1); French (Dolby Surround 2.0); Subtitles in English SDH, Spanish, French, Portuguese, Chinese and Indonesian; Runtime: 930 minutes		Bisoux a Paris!: Go Abroad on a Spree in Paris with the Cast and Creative Teams; Exposing Gossip Girl: The Making of Episode 18: The Complete Lowdown on the Creative Processes Behind "The Kids Stay in the Picture"; Gag Reel; Unaired Scenes
Release Dates
Region 1	Region 2	Region 4
August 23, 2011	August 15, 2011	September 5, 2011 (Brazil); September 7, 2011 (Australia)
