= The Undergraduates =

- Gossip Girl episode
- Episode no.: Season 4 Episode 3
- Directed by: Norman Buckley
- Written by: Amanda Lasher
- Production code: 403
- Original air date: September 27, 2010

Guest appearances
- Zuzanna Szadkowski as Dorota Kishlovsky; Connor Paolo as Eric van der Woodsen; Michelle Trachtenberg as Georgina Sparks; Katie Cassidy as Juliet Sharp; Clémence Poésy as Eva Coupeau; Amanda Setton as Penelope Shafai; Melissa Fumero as Zoe; Alice Callahan as Jessica

Episode chronology
← Previous "Double Identity"	Next → "Touch of Eva"
- Gossip Girl season 4

"The Undergraduates" is the 68th episode of the CW television series Gossip Girl, as well as the third episode of the show's fourth season. The episode was written by Amanda Lasher and directed by Norman Buckley. It aired on Monday, September 27, 2010 on the CW.

The Undergraduates shows Serena van der Woodsen (Blake Lively) and Blair Waldorf (Leighton Meester) on their return from Paris, attending their first day in Columbia University while facing sabotage from Juliet Sharp (Katie Cassidy) who tries to jeopardize their friendship and the return of Georgina Sparks (Michelle Trachtenberg) as she reveals the truth to Dan Humphrey (Penn Badgley) regarding their son, Milo. Chuck Bass (Ed Westwick) is reluctant to introduce his new love Eva Coupeau (Clémence Poésy) to Rufus (Matthew Settle) and Lily Humphrey (Kelly Rutherford) following the event that triggered Jenny Humphrey (Taylor Momsen) leaving Manhattan and fearing that Eva might not accept details behind his past. The episode featured a Fashion's Night Out theme party and a cameo from prominent fashion designer, Diane von Fürstenberg.

== Production ==
During the preview for the episode, Gossip Girl producers Stephanie Savage and Joshua Safran discussed the premise of the episode and working the episode into the Fashion's Night Out event.

"In this episode, it is Serena and Blair's first day of school and obviously, Nate's first day of school as well and they discover that they are not alone at school, somebody else goes there from the recent past of their stories. Also, in this episode, the Fashion's Night Out event takes place as you saw them planning it in episode 4.01, and it's very glamorous, very beautiful, it brings out all the characters together."

=== Filming locations ===
Stephanie Savage noted that the show had been working closely with prominent members of New York's fashion industry, citing Vogue magazine, the CFDA led by Diane von Fürstenberg, and the New York City Company to integrate the episode into the event. Real footage on the September 10th event of Fashion's Night Out had been inserted into the episode while working on the event itself. Savage commented on the filming of the episode, stating "it's really cool to be the only show to be working with these amazing organizations to be a part of a real event."

Columbia University makes its 3rd appearance on the show since the third season twentieth episode, It’s a Dad, Dad, Dad, Dad World and the sixth episode of the second season, New Haven Can Wait and becomes the primary filming location for the episode. Blake Lively and Clémence Poésy filmed their scenes outside a Carlos Miele store in the Meatpacking District at Downtown, Manhattan on July 15, 2010.

=== Casting ===
Amanda Setton reprises her role from the first and second seasons of Gossip Girl as Penelope Shafai. Digital Spy announced her return to the show with her character facing off against Blair Waldorf, further adding that "Blair's made a fair few enemies in her life, so it was only a matter of time until it started to come back to haunt her" and that "their roles have been reversed." Melissa Fumero and Alice Callahan also reprise their roles as Blair's new minions, Zoe and Jessica from the third season. Tory Burch, Alessandra Ambrosio, Hamish Bowles, Molly Sims and Robin Thicke also make cameos in the episode.

=== Fashion ===
The Fashion's Night Out-themed episode featured a wide array of designer looks from the show from Reem Acra, Jenny Packham, Valentino to Diane von Fürstenberg. Leighton Meester wore a sparkling Valentino dress, one that Sharon Clott from MTV praised. Blake Lively donned a Jenny Packham dress from her Fall 2010 collection paired with Raphael Young shoes. Katie Cassidy was seen wearing a beige dress designed by Yigal Azrouël with leopard print denim pumps from Dolce & Gabbana while filming with Lively, who was dressed in a Robert Rodriguez top and a Missoni skirt. Cassidy later wore a Fashion's Night Out tank with a Zadig and Voltaire shirt. On July 14, 2010, a scene at Columbia showed Lively wearing Diane von Fürstenberg and Meester in Pucci, followed by a floral halter from the Erdem Spring 2010 collection and floral print skirt by Charlotte Ronson. Clémence Poésy was seen wearing a Carlos Miele gown and Kelly Rutherford donned a purple Reem Acra dress.

== Reception ==
"The Undergraduates" was watched by 1.78 million viewers and achieved a 1.0 Adults 18-49 demo.

The episode makes several references to past plots from the past seasons. New York Magazine listed a majority of these from Serena's unstable romantic history, Rufus's revelation that Chuck had previously tried to rape Jenny, and members of Hamilton House drinking on steps in similar fashion to Constance Billard. The episode was commended for the authenticity of the Fashion's Night Out party and Blair and Serena showing consistency in their friendship when faced with sabotage from Juliet.
