= The Townie =

- Gossip Girl episode
- Blair, Dan and Nate corner Juliet
- Episode no.: Season 4 Episode 11
- Directed by: Joe Lazarov
- Written by: Amanda Lasher & Stephanie Savage
- Production code: 411
- Original air date: December 6, 2010

Guest appearances
- Connor Paolo as Eric van der Woodsen; Francie Swift as Anne Archibald; Sam Robards as Howard Archibald; Kevin Zegers as Damien Daalgard; Katie Cassidy as Juliet Sharp; David Call as Ben Donovan; Marsha Dietlien Bennett as Cynthia Sharp

Episode chronology
← Previous "Gaslit"	Next → "The Kids Are Not Alright"
- Gossip Girl season 4

"The Townie" is the 76th episode of the CW television series, Gossip Girl, as well as the eleventh episode of the show's fourth season. The episode was written by Amanda Lasher and Stephanie Savage and directed by Joe Lazarov. It aired on Monday, December 6, 2010 on the CW.

The episode is currently the highest-rated episode of the fourth season. "The Townie" shows Blair Waldorf (Leighton Meester) and Dan Humphrey (Penn Badgley) joining forces to track down Juliet Sharp (Katie Cassidy). An institutionalized Serena van der Woodsen (Blake Lively) expounds her boarding school experiences to her therapist and discovers the truth behind Juliet's vendetta against her. Chuck Bass (Ed Westwick) faces the prospect of inheriting Bass Industries but faces trouble when Lily Humphrey's (Kelly Rutherford) family secrets are uncovered.

== Production ==
Although credited, Taylor Momsen and Jessica Szohr do not appear in this episode. Juliet Sharp (Katie Cassidy) exits the show in this episode, marking "The Townie" as her eleventh and final episode until the finale. Kevin Zegers returns to the show as Damien Daalgaard, making his first appearance in the fourth season since breaking up with Jenny Humphrey (Taylor Momsen) in the fifteenth episode of the show's third season.

=== Fashion ===
While filming a flashback scene, Blake Lively was seen dressed in a Boy blazer, a Rag & Bone shirt, Joie shorts, DKNY tights, Rag & Bone shoes, Brooks Brothers tie, Repossi ring, and Be & D bag. The scenes at the Ostroff Center had her wearing a Salvatore Ferragamo top, Vince pants, Roberto del Carlo boots, Oscar de la Renta necklace, and Low Luv rings while Katie Cassidy was filmed wearing an ALC dress, Hue tights, and Manolo Blahnik boots. Leighton Meester wore a Dries van Noten top, Ulla Johnson skirt, Hue tights, Alex Woo necklace for the majority of the episode.

== Cultural allusions ==
- A flashback shows Serena discussing Sylvia Plath with her English teacher, Ben Donovan.
- A second flashback shows Serena and Ben recovering from a storm. Ben briefly mentions the Mary McCarthy Library at Vassar.
- Juliet is seen driving a Mercury on her way home to Connecticut.

== Reception ==
"The Townie" was watched by 2.06 million viewers and achieved a 1.0 Adults 18-49 demo. It is the most watched episode of the fourth season. TV Fanatic praised the episode, stating "Gossip Girl has aired terrific mid-season finales in the past, and "The Townie" was no exception." Judy Berman of the Los Angeles Times commended the episode stating "This week's "Gossip Girl" was easily the best [episode] of the season." Berman complimented Serena's consistency in her own self-doubt when mentioning her tryst with Nate during the first season, citing "It's kind of pathetic that Serena has so little confidence in her ability to change -- but it isn't exactly out of character, either." Berman also lauded the show's return to creative form, stating "Whenever I start to think that the show has run out of material[...] -- it unleashes a showstopping hour of sparkly melodrama that reminds me of why I'm still watching."
