= Easy J =

- Gossip Girl episode
- Jenny returns to New York City.
- Episode no.: Season 4 Episode 6
- Directed by: Lee Shallat-Chemel
- Written by: Jake Coburn
- Production code: 406
- Original air date: October 25, 2010

Guest appearances
- Katie Cassidy as Juliet Sharp; Connor Paolo as Eric van der Woodsen; Amanda Setton as Penelope Shafai; David Call as Ben Donovan; Sam Page as Colin Forrester; Sam Robards as Howard Archibald; Aaron Schwartz as Vanya; Melissa Fumero as Zoe; Alice Callahan as Jessica; Tim Gunn as himself; Ivanka Trump as herself; Jared Kushner as himself

Episode chronology
← Previous "Goodbye, Columbia"	Next → "War at the Roses"
- Gossip Girl season 4

"Easy J" is the 71st episode of the CW television series, Gossip Girl, as well as the sixth episode of the show's fourth season. The episode was written by Jake Coburn and directed by Lee Shallat-Chemel. It aired on Monday, October 25, 2010 on the CW.

Easy J focuses on the return of Jenny Humphrey (Taylor Momsen) and the consequences she faces from her short visit to Manhattan while Blair Waldorf (Leighton Meester) hunts her down in the hope of maintaining her social order and eschewing any possible attempts by Chuck Bass (Ed Westwick) to ruin her at the same time. Serena van der Woodsen (Blake Lively) runs into unfortunate circumstances when she discovers that her new flame is also her college professor.

== Plot ==
The episode begins with a Blair Waldorf dream sequence of Wait Until Dark with her as Audrey Hepburn being attacked. However, unlike in the film, her attacker is, strangely, a blond female.

Blair awakes to find Serena with an unmade bed, messy hair, and adorning the same clothes from the previous day. Serena admits to having spent the night with "The Cab Stealer.", Colin Forrester (Sam Page). However, they spent the night talking of pop art in lieu of sleeping together. Serena says she refuses to be one of the women he hands off in a cab every morning.

Blair explains her dream to Serena, who believes it to be about recently becoming Chuck's active target. Blair is unsure, however, and wonders aloud why the attacker would be female.

After spending the night with Nate (Chace Crawford), Juliet Sharp (Katie Cassidy) departs early so as "not to be late to class." Nate is disappointed, hoping to have spent more time with her. Via phone, Dan (Penn Badgley) assures him it's probably the truth. As Nate ends his call with Dan, getting in line to visit his Dad in prison, he spots a sheepish Juliet.

Jenny returns to New York, only to face an angry Blair – willing to do anything to make "Little J" leave town again.

On her way to class, Serena spots her fling, Colin from the night before while entering the building. Irked, Serena is further thrown off by the revelation that he is her Psychology of Business professor, a fact that threats their relationship.

Blair visits the Van Der Woodsen residence and runs into Jenny. Outraged that Jenny is breaking the rules about being "banished," and after some verbal sparring, Blair grants her "amnesty 'till midnight" if Jenny refuses to be seen while in the city. Blair seeks out Chuck at Columbia, after a brief chat with Serena about the Cab Stealer turned Professor. She asks if he knows about Jenny Humphrey's return, and warns him it will damage his reputation as well as hers if the story about Jenny's virginity is outed; however, unknown to Blair, Chuck is responsible for Jenny's return to Manhattan, and remains nonchalant about the possibility of the truth being revealed. After talking to Chuck, Blair assigns her minions to stake-out the Van Der Woodsen residence, in order to make sure Jenny doesn't violate the terms of her Manhattan amnesty.

Dan and Eric (Connor Paolo) find it strange when Jenny declines going out to one of her favorite venues, so she explains to them the terms of the agreement she made with Blair. However, Jenny ultimately reveals to Gossip Girl to whom she lost her virginity, and after a confrontation with both Chuck and Blair, decides to leave town again. At the episode's end, Chuck visits Blair in her apartment, and, after agreeing that the circumstances surrounding their breakup were beyond both their controls, the two agree to end their war, before they both destroy each other.

== Production ==
=== Casting ===
Sam Robards reprises his role of Howard "The Captain" Archibald, making an appearance on the show since the second season episode, The Magnificent Archibalds. Katie Cassidy makes her sixth appearance on the show as Juliet Sharp.

On August 17, 2010, Michael Ausiello from Entertainment Weekly reported that Project Runway's mentor, Tim Gunn, will be appearing as himself in the episode, which was later confirmed to be the episode featuring the first appearance of Taylor Momsen in the fourth season.

Mad Men star Sam Page makes his second appearance in the show, elaborated his character's personality and the four episode story arc involving the main cast, calling him a "terrifically successful, young, financier...and he's taken quite a shine to Serena."

Tim Gunn made a cameo appearance as himself, but later said that he had difficulty working with actress Taylor Momsen due to her unprofessional behavior.

Following October 6, 2010, Ausiello reported that the characters of Serena and Nate will negotiate a peace treaty between the warring exes, Chuck and Blair, and that Blair will allow wannabe fashion designer Jenny to temporarily gain entry to the island of Manhattan to meet with Tim Gunn about a job opportunity. Also from Entertainment Weekly, Kristin Dos Santos reported on October 7, 2010, that Juliet will recruit Jenny and another major character's help for a scheme against Serena.

InStyle and CBSNews reported that New York City socialite Ivanka Trump and her husband Jared Kushner will be making cameo appearances for the episode. Fashion designer Isaac Mizrahi posted on his website that one of the characters will be wearing his designs and that he will make a cameo appearance as well.

=== Fashion ===
Ivanka Trump wore a Naeem Khan gown on the set. Isaac Mizrahi posted on his website that Kelly Rutherford wore one of his dresses and several jewelry pieces designed by Ivanka herself. InStyle reported that Taylor Momsen wore a one-shoulder Emilio Pucci dress paired with a Carlos Fachi clutch, Leighton Meester was clothed in a dress designed by Victoria Beckham, and Blake Lively wore a Maxime Simoens for The Observer's New Yorkers party scene.

== Reception ==
This episode was watched by 1.88 million of viewers, which was up from last week's episode, which had a viewership of 1.78 million of viewers. The show also built on its 90210 lead in by 16% in women 18–34 (2.2/6) and 8% in adults 18–34 (1.4/4).

On set problems were revealed when Entertainment Weekly reported that Tim Gunn was displeased with Taylor Momsen's on set behavior but enjoyed working with the rest of the cast, calling Penn Badgley in particular, "a delight to work with".
