= Petty in Pink =

- Gossip Girl episode
- Episode no.: Season 4 Episode 19
- Directed by: Liz Friedlander
- Written by: Amanda Lasher
- Production code: 419
- Original air date: April 25, 2011

Guest appearances
- Connor Paolo as Eric van der Woodsen; Francie Swift as Anne Archibald; Tika Sumpter as Raina Thorpe; Kaylee DeFer as Charlotte "Charlie" Rhodes; Hugo Becker as Louis Grimaldi; Kevin Stapleton as Andrew Tyler; Amanda Setton as Penelope Shafai; Alice Callahan as Jessica; Dominik Tiefenthaler as Lucien

Episode chronology
← Previous "The Kids Stay in the Picture"	Next → "The Princesses and the Frog"
- Gossip Girl season 4

"Petty in Pink" is the 84th episode of the CW television series, Gossip Girl and the 19th episode of the show's fourth season. The episode was written by Amanda Lasher and directed by Liz Friedlander. It originally aired on Monday, April 25, 2011 on the CW.

Petty in Pink delves into the deteriorating friendship between Dan Humphrey (Penn Badgley) and Vanessa Abrams (Jessica Szohr), amends and reflections that Lily Humphrey (Kelly Rutherford) slowly absorbs as her house arrest soon makes her realize, Charlie Rhodes' (Kaylee DeFer) integration into the world of the Upper East Side, the continued dilemma that Chuck Bass (Ed Westwick) faces as he continues to hold on to the burdening secret of his legacy as well as the impact it might cause to Raina Thorpe (Tika Sumpter), and the fairytale romance between Blair Waldorf (Leighton Meester) and Louis Grimaldi (Hugo Becker). The episode drew positive reviews from critics with critical praise towards Leighton Meester, Penn Badgley, and Ed Westwick.

== Plot ==
The opening montage shows Blair Waldorf preparing for her date with Louis, having received the heel that she gave him as a parting gift from Paris. Lily van der Woodsen (Kelly Rutherford) finds herself under house arrest in her apartment, spending time through online shopping and preparing the Pink Party, a cancer awareness charity event. As she makes her preparations, Anne Archibald (Francie Swift) arrives to tell Lily that the gift bags will be prepared at a different venue. Lily soon realizes that her incriminated status has caused her supposed friends to shun her. When Blair decides to skip a class and commands that her minions go take her class take notes for her. She keeps the identity of her date secret until Penelope (Amanda Setton) sends a tip to Gossip Girl that Blair has a secret date. Following a voice mail from Vanessa about Dan and Blair's kiss, Serena (Blake Lively) recruits Charlie to help her find information behind Dan and Blair's kiss, training Charlie in the methods of using Gossip Girl and receives word of Blair's date on her blog. At the loft, Rufus (Matthew Settle) inspires Dan to repair his friendship with Vanessa and leaves Dan, who finds himself on a job writing an article involving a royal that recently arrived in New York.

Charlie finds herself on stakeout and sees Dan and Blair having a conversation at the restaurant counter. Charlie informs Serena of Blair and Dan's date but is unaware that Dan had left after Blair forces him out to make her date with Louis. Shortly, Serena arrives at the restaurant and realizes that Blair is dating Louis, shrugging off her suspicions that Dan and Blair are seeing each other. Insisting that she couldn't have mistaken Dan for someone else, Serena praises her work but Charlie excuses herself, saying that she'll be staying to scout out New York University. As Serena leaves, the audience sees Charlie using the Gossip Girl spotted map, looking for Dan.

At the Empire Hotel, Raina finds herself troubled over the whereabouts of her mother and enlists that aid of a private investigator. Nate however, suspects something when he sees a change in Chuck's demeanor and follows Raina. Chuck later discovers that Raina is looking for her mother. Around NYU Dan calls Vanessa and patch their differences, inviting her over at the loft.

Blair and Louis find themselves being tracked down by Lucien (Dominik Tiefenthaler), Louis' royal adviser, and Blair discovers that Lucien had bribed Dan on the pretense that he was interested in Dan's writing. Blair calls Dan and demands that he meet her at a store. Charlie continues her investigation of Dan and finds him with Blair, who plans her scheme to drive out Louis. Blair persuades Dan to stage a fake relationship at the Pink party thereby convincing Lucien to leave without Louis and for Blair to be able to spend time with him. Charlie takes a photo of Blair presenting a pink tie to Dan and sends it to Serena, who conspires with Eric and Rufus to have the Pink party moved at the van der Woodsen apartment. Serena decides to blackmail a party planner to keep an eye on Dan and Blair. The move complicates Dan and Blair's scheme as they both fear that Serena will find out about their scheme and misunderstand their intentions behind it. Nate and Raina proceed to leave for New Jersey after discovering that Raina's possible mother was there and Chuck decides to accompany them.

At a diner, Nate, Chuck and Raina confront a waitress who fits her mother's description but finds a case of mistaken identity. Returning to the Empire Hotel, Chuck enlists the aid of his private investigator to investigate the events that lead to the death of Raina's mother. The transfer of the Pink party draws the ire of Lily's guests, especially Anne, who confronts Lily over the party transfer. Lily realizes that someone had moved the party and that none of the women whom she considered as friends consider her as a friend. Dan and Blair succeed in their scheme but are unaware that Charlie has been filming their kiss and sends it to Gossip Girl, who sends a blast to everyone at the party. Dan finds out that Charlie was responsible as he and Blair look for Serena. Serena tells Louis that Blair has been lying to him and Dan and Blair explain everything to her. Serena finds herself betrayed further conflict rises when Serena raises Blair's jealousy being the reason why she finds herself drawn to Dan until Blair berates Serena's arrogance and her need to be the center of attention. Blair leaves Serena to look for Louis. Unable to take the scrutiny, Lily disobeys her house arrest and goes down to the lobby, waiting for the police to arrive. The police arrive but Lily asks them to shut down the event, at the same time avoiding arrest. Charlie later arrives at Brooklyn to apologize to Dan, adding that everything had happened because of Vanessa's message to Serena.

The closing montage shows Blair convincing Louis that she loves him and make their relationship public, Dan shutting out Vanessa and severing ties with her while letting Charlie stay for a drink, Serena calling Louis' driver, and Chuck watching the security tapes that recorded the night of Avery Thorpe's disappearance.

== Production ==
=== Filming Locations ===
The phone call between Dan and Vanessa was filmed in on the 16th Street between Broadway Ave and Fifth Ave. Veselka is used on set to film the scene of a date between Blair and Louis as well as Charlie's look out for a possible affair between Blair and Dan.

=== Fashion ===
New York Magazine praised the Roger Vivier heel that Blair wore from the Paris story arc, calling it a "recap-worthy memory."

InStyle reported news of the clothing for the cast to wear for a cancer awareness-month themed episode that would host a pink party for the set. Blake Lively and Kaylee DeFer wore differing pink hued dresses of Marchesa and BCBG, respectively while Kelly Rutherford wore Redux gown. Leighton Meester would make another memorable outfit for InStyle wearing a pink dress designed by Oscar de la Renta and a Swarovski necklace. An Oscar de la Renta-designed gown had previously been used for the season's second episode, Double Identity that Meester had worn for the Paris story arc.

For the scene involving a phone conversation between Dan and Vanessa, Jessica Szohr was dressed in a Matthew Williamson dress covered by a Christian Cota winter coat. During the opening montage, Leighton Meester wore a Dior printed dress paired with Badgley Mischka shoes.

== Reception ==
"Petty in Pink" was watched by 1.55 million live viewers and a 0.8 rating in the Adults 18-49 demo.

New York Magazine praised the episode, placing emphasis on the shaky friendships throughout the episode, listing down Anne Archibald's cold-shouldering Lily for when the Captain was down and out, Dan effectively ending his friendship with Vanessa and Nate's relationship with Raina unaware of the impact that it has caused Chuck. Further praise went to Leighton Meester's performance of Blair as she brought down Serena's egotistic tendencies and intellectual shortcomings.

Steve Marsi of Tv Fanatic commended the episode performance, stating that it "had all the makings of a solid episode and it delivered.", giving praise to Dan Humphrey's story arc and the realization of his feelings for Blair, his deteriorating friendship with Vanessa and her continued status as an outsider, Blair's growing relationship with Dan and her romance with Prince Louis. Further praise went to Ed Westwick, whose performance as Chuck Bass was compared to a Howard Hughes routine but one that "continues to sell [it] so well". The character of Charlie was warmly welcomed, stating that she "good-naturedly mocked the show and its often convoluted plot lines."

TV Guide negatively reviewed the character of Vanessa, describing her character's direction "from a borderline interesting counterpoint to all the glamour of her surroundings to a sniveling buttinsky with nothing better to do than meddle for the sole sake of spoiling everyone's fun.", laying out the possibility of her character leaving or becoming a villain.
