= Gaslit (Gossip Girl episode) =

- Gossip Girl episode
- Jenny tells Blair the truth behind Serena's overdose
- Episode no.: Season 4 Episode 10
- Directed by: Tate Donovan
- Written by: Robert Hull & Joshua Safran
- Production code: 410
- Original air date: November 29, 2010

Guest appearances
- Zuzanna Szadkowki as Dorota Kishlovsky; Connor Paolo as Eric van der Woodsen; Katie Cassidy as Juliet Sharp; Sam Robards as Howard Archibald; Francie Swift as Anne Archibald; David Call as Ben Donovan

Episode chronology
← Previous "The Witches of Bushwick"	Next → "The Townie"
- Gossip Girl season 4

"Gaslit" is the 75th episode of the CW television series Gossip Girl, and the tenth episode of the show fourth season. The episode was written by Robert Hull and Joshua Safran, and directed by Tate Donovan. It aired on Monday, November 29, 2010, on The CW.

"Gaslit" is the fourth Thanksgiving-themed episode of Gossip Girl, and received positive reviews from critics. The episode deals with the gaslighting of Serena van der Woodsen (played by Blake Lively) as she copes with her supposed return to drug and alcohol abuse, the continued reluctance of Blair Waldorf (Leighton Meester) to resume a troubled relationship with her former flame, Chuck Bass (Ed Westwick), and short-lived return Jenny Humphrey (Taylor Momsen) to the Upper East Side as she and Vanessa Abrams (Jessica Szohr) face the consequences of working with Juliet Sharp (Katie Cassidy) in taking down Serena.

== Plot ==
The episode opens with Blair discussing her activities with Dorota during Thanksgiving. Blair remains firmly adamant against Serena for what she did to her and Chuck during his party from the previous episode and plans to leave New York to spend Thanksgiving in Paris with her father. Dorota slowly persuades her to stay as she mentions making Blair's father's pumpkin pie, thereby persuading Blair to send it to the van der Woodsens by herself, hoping to make Serena apologize for what she had done. At the van der Woodsen apartment, Lily (Kelly Rutherford) releases her frustrations against Serena seemingly dropping out of college along with Eric (Connor Paolo). Throughout the city, Dan and Vanessa discuss spending Thanksgiving together while Nate (Chace Crawford) incidentally receives his parents' divorce papers. As Blair and Dorota arrive at the van der Woodsen apartment, she hands the pumpkin pie to Lily to honor her yearly traditions. When Blair asks about Serena, Lily questions her whereabouts as well and everyone realizes that Serena has been missing since Chuck's party. Meanwhile, a drugged and distressed Serena wakes up in a motel filled with pills and liquor bottles and calls 911 for help.

Outside of Nate's apartment, Nate tells Dan (Penn Badgley) about his parents' divorce and their conversation is interrupted by Rufus (Matthew Settle) calling Dan about Serena, who has been hospitalized because of a potentially fatal overdose. Back in Hudson, Jenny receives news from Rufus about Serena's overdose and consequently drives Jenny's guilt, not realizing that Juliet had gone too far in her plans of destroying Serena, and Jenny sets off for New York. Vanessa, unaware that Serena is hospitalized, finds herself alone when she arrives at the van der Woodsen apartment and receives a text from Jenny implying that their plan to ruin had gone too far.

At the hospital, the family receives news that Serena had been taking medication meant for treating depression. Believing that her daughter has returned to her old habits, Lily has Serena involuntarily committed to the Ostroff Center. At the Ostroff Center, Serena furiously refuses to be committed at the center, saying that she didn't drug herself. While everyone thinks that Serena is in denial, Dan chooses to believe Serena's sentiment. At Juliet's apartment, Jenny tells Juliet that she'll be telling the truth to everyone, prompting Juliet to pack her bags and leave. As Vanessa makes her way to the Ostroff Center to talk to Dan, she calls Juliet and expresses that they should tell the truth about what they did to Serena. Juliet tells Vanessa that if Jenny tells the truth, they'll eventually forgive her because she's a family member but Vanessa won't be given the same kind of forgiveness, further driving Vanessa to self-preservation by including that her involvement will drive Dan back to Serena. At the Ostroff Center, Blair and Chuck are surprised to see Jenny, who in turn is surprised when she receives a scolding from Rufus. Vanessa tells Jenny that she told Rufus everything and lays the blame on her. A shocked Lily enters when she realizes that Serena is missing from her room.

At the prison, Nate is surprised to see his mother, who has changed her mind about visiting his father. Helping Serena escape, Dan rushes her off to the Humphrey loft and plan a road trip. Their plans are cut short when Lily catches them and Serena isolates herself from her mother while Lily confronts Dan, who expresses his frustrations at Lily's choosing to ignore Serena. Rufus continues to scold Jenny for what she did and as Jenny explains the truth, Rufus continues his scolding, causing Jenny to leave. As Blair convinces Serena to get better, Gossip Girl sends a blast consisting of photos of Juliet in Serena's guise doing drugs and partying, causing Serena to doubt herself and return to the Ostroff Center. While visiting her brother in prison, Juliet reveals that she drugged Serena and even shocks Ben (David Call) for what she has done, saying that drugging her is going too far in their plans to ruin her. Juliet expresses her anger at losing her place and her life in Columbia in her attempt at trying to ruin Serena and leaves her brother. On her way out, she spots Nate and his parents and hurriedly leaves. Hoping to find Juliet, Jenny sees trash bags on the floor of her empty apartment, picks up the mask that Juliet used to drug Serena, and realizes that Juliet has escaped.

Despite his efforts, Anne Archibald (Francie Swift) continues to move forward with her divorce from his father (Sam Robards) and disappoints Nate. When a furious Blair sees Jenny walk into her apartment, Jenny confesses what she, Vanessa and Juliet did. Realizing the truth, Blair offers Jenny an opportunity to help her find Juliet but Jenny turns it down, telling Blair that she was right in banishing her and leaves. At a hotel bar, Lily pays Juliet for her silence in what seems to be one of Serena's past transgressions, unaware that of Juliet's plans of escaping. At the prison, Nate hears that his mother's visit was just in time for his father's parole approval. At the Empire Hotel, Chuck receives Blair's father's pumpkin pie as a sign of goodwill from Blair. Vanessa, in contrast, receives a text from Jenny that she confessed everything to Blair. Fearing Blair's wrath, Vanessa calls her mother and leaves town. Meanwhile, Serena and her family happily spend Thanksgiving at the Ostroff Center.

As Dan looks out onto the city, Blair visits the Humphrey loft and reveals to Dan that Juliet is responsible for Serena's overdose and that she plans to hunt her down.

== Production ==
Gaslit showcased a majority of designer clothes but is the only episode with the fewest costume changes. InStyle praised the fashions displayed throughout the episode, praising Taylor Momsen in Zero Maria Corejo coat, an Alexander Wang sweater, a BCBG skirt, Spanx tights, Cleobella bag, Tania Spinelli boots, and Courtney Lee Collection necklace. Katie as Juliet wore a Cut 25 dress, Hue tights, and Louboutin heels.

This was Taylor Momsen's last appearance as a main cast member (she later made a cameo appearance in the series finale), following an announcement on May 9, 2011, that stated that she would not be back as a series regular. However, she remains listed in the credits on all season four episodes.

== Reception ==
"Gaslit" was watched by 1.96 million viewers and garnered a 1.0 Adults 18-49 demo.

Mark O. Estes from Tv Overmind praised the episode saying "this GG outing turned out to be the best episode since the Paris arc at the beginning of the season. Hands down." but was displeased with the direction of Vanessa's character, stating "even I can't speak up for her throwing Jenny under the bus the way she did." and further elaborated that the show's writers are catering to fans' negative reception of Vanessa. Further praise came to Chuck and Blair's storyline, calling it "very mature and adult, something we've been asking for all season." and commended Ed Westwick's performance but hoped to see the two "reconcile on a more permanent basis."

The episode received praise for the show's direction as more mature storylines were incorporated into the show. Jerome Wetzel of Blogcritics commended the episode, stating how "[the show] seems to have raised the stakes this season. Long gone are the high schools days of the show's first two years, and here to stay seem to be adult consequences for the decisions the characters face." and was "thrilled that Serena and Dan are heading for a reconnection." Chris Rovzar and Jessica Pressler from New York Magazine however, considered the episode to be unrealistic and ridiculous but complimented Matthew Settle's performance and the minute interaction between Chuck and Blair. Tv Fanatic praised the Thanksgiving episode, calling it "grim, slower-paced and more somber than any so far this season". Gossip Girl has been known to make somber and dark storylines for its Thanksgiving episodes and ranked Gaslit as one of the darkest. Further praise went to Katie Cassidy's character, Juliet Sharp, with Steve Marsi declaring her "as one of the best villains in Gossip Girl history."

Judy Berman of the Los Angeles Times commended the dark nature of the episode and when comparing it to previous Thanksgiving episodes of the show, Berman concluded her comparison stating that "[Gaslit] may well have been the most twisted." Berman praised the reduced interaction between Blair and Chuck as well as Vanessa's decline as a prominent character, citing her walking alone into Lily and Rufus' apartment to celebrate Thanksgiving only to find everyone gone but Dorota and her baby. "If that is not a metaphor for the character's diminishing place on the show, I don't know what is." Berman further questioned Jenny approaching Blair with information regarding their actions against Serena, stating "Why would Jenny, who's supposed to be done with scheming, go to her enemy with the information instead of enlightening her family and getting Serena out of rehab? Obviously, it will be more fun to watch Blair ruin Juliet than to see Rufus and Lily call the cops on her. But is this a decision any real person, even Jenny Humphrey, would make?..."
