= Double Identity (Gossip Girl) =

- Gossip Girl episode
- Blair and Chuck meet in Paris
- Episode no.: Season 4 Episode 2
- Directed by: Mark Piznarski
- Written by: Sara Goodman & Joshua Safran
- Production code: 402
- Original air date: September 20, 2010

Guest appearances
- Katie Cassidy as Juliet Sharp; Clémence Poésy as Eva Coupeau; Hugo Becker as Louis Grimaldi; Ronald Guttman as Inspector Chevalier

Episode chronology
← Previous "Belles de Jour"	Next → "The Undergraduates"
- Gossip Girl season 4

"Double Identity" is the 67th episode of the CW television series, Gossip Girl, as well as the second episode of the show's fourth season. The episode was written by Joshua Safran and Stephanie Savage and directed by Mark Piznarski. It originally aired on Monday, September 20, 2010, on the CW.

== Plot ==
Serena and Blair both run into a different Chuck in Paris, who is discovered to now be living with Eva, a young French woman who saved his life after he was shot in Prague. Juliet suggests that tricking Vanessa to be with Dan might be the right thing to remove Dan from the Dan-Serena-Nate triangle. Rufus learns that Dan isn't Milo's father after he checks Georgina's and Milo's blood test. Serena finds Chuck, and discovers his plan to leave Paris under a different identity. Prior to Blair's date with Prince Louis Grimaldi, she visits Harry Winston, when Serena and a French detective arrive, and it is revealed to both Serena and Blair that Chuck had intended to propose to Blair before he was shot. Ultimately, Serena convinces Blair to intercept Chuck at the train station before he left Paris with Eva, and convince him to return to New York.

== Production ==
Leighton Meester had been dressed in an Oscar de la Renta gown while filming in Paris' famous Avenue Montaigne. The final scene between Chuck and Blair was shot at the Gare du Nord in July 2010.

Although she is credited, Taylor Momsen (Jenny Humphrey) does not appear in this episode.

== Cultural allusions ==
- Dan sings a derivative song of This Land Is Your Land by singer-songwriter Woody Guthrie called "This loft is your loft" as a lullaby to his son, Milo.
- Blair refers to Sophie's Choice to describe Serena's dilemma between Nate and Dan.
- Lily states that Rufus licensed a Lincoln Hawk song for Chicago Hope.
- Inspector Chevalier is named after Inspector Chevalier Dupin of The Murders at the Rue Morgue.
- Juliet compares Serena's life to a Jane Austen novel.

== Reception ==
The episode was watched by 1.836 million of viewers, but it was 25% up from last week's premiere with women 18–34 to a 2.5/6 and was up 7% with adults 18–34. It was also the first time that the second episode of the season was higher than the premiere episode.

The episode received generally favorable reviews from critics, who praised Leighton Meester and Ed Westwick for their acting. Entertainment Weekly praised the train station scene, calling it "stunningly shot and impeccably acted". Michael Ausiello integrated suspense on Serena's storyline, telling viewers "By the end of the second episode, the question you (and everyone else) will be asking yourself is “Who the hell did Serena piss off?”". On the possibility of a reunion between Chuck and Blair, EW stated that "Waldorf and Bass are epic, eternal and sure to reunite again one of these days."

During the night that this episode aired, the name "Chuck Bass" was one of the trending topics on Twitter.
