= The Wrong Goodbye =

The Wrong Goodbye may refer to:

- "The Wrong Goodbye" (Gossip Girl), an episode of the American Television series, Gossip Girl
- "The Wrong Goodbye", an episode of the British comedy-drama series, Minder
- "The Wrong Goodbye", an episode of the British comedy-drama series, Doc Martin
