= Belles de Jour =

- Gossip Girl episode
- Blair and Serena having fun in Paris
- Episode no.: Season 4 Episode 1
- Directed by: Mark Piznarski
- Written by: Joshua Safran & Stephanie Savage
- Production code: 401
- Original air date: September 13, 2010 (The CW)

Guest appearances
- Hugo Becker as Louis Grimaldi; Katie Cassidy as Juliet Sharp; Margaret Colin as Eleanor Waldorf Rose; Lou Doillon as herself; Clémence Poésy as Eva Coupeau; Michelle Trachtenberg as Georgina Sparks

Episode chronology
← Previous "Last Tango, Then Paris"	Next → "Double Identity"
- Gossip Girl season 4

"Belles de Jour" is the 66th episode of the CW television series Gossip Girl, as well as the season premiere of the show's fourth season. The episode was written by Joshua Safran and Stephanie Savage and directed by Mark Piznarski. It originally aired on Monday, September 13, 2010, on the CW. The episode filmed several scenes in Paris, a move that was heavily promoted by the show's network and commended by critics. A promotional video entitled "Oh Mon Dieu" used a French rendition of Nancy Sinatra's "These Boots Were Made For Walking" to advertise the season premiere.

The episode received generally favorable reviews, with critics and fans praising Katie Cassidy for her performances as Juliet Sharp. The fourth season premiere opens with Serena van der Woodsen (Blake Lively) and Blair Waldorf (Leighton Meester) spending their vacation in Paris to move on from their troubles. Vanessa Abrams (Jessica Szohr) returns to New York and finds Dan Humphrey (Penn Badgley) living with Georgina Sparks (Michelle Trachtenberg) and a baby, while Nate Archibald (Chace Crawford) attempts to move on from his breakup with Serena, he befriends Juliet Sharp (Katie Cassidy), a girl with ulterior motives for helping him.

== Plot ==
Serena and Blair enjoy their summer vacation in Paris trying to take their minds off of home. Chuck is recovering after being found and healed by Eva. Meanwhile, back in New York, Eleanor helps make arrangements for the Fashion's Night Out gathering at the Van Der Woodsen apartment and Dan and Nate prepare to face Serena.

== Production ==
=== Casting ===
The fourth season premiere showed cameos from prominent members of the fashion and film industry. During the Fashion's Night Out party, fashion models Corinna Drengk and Karlie Kloss make a cameo appearance as Lily's guests and French actress and fashion model Lou Doillon makes a cameo during Serena and Blair's double date. A new love interest for Blair had been cast for the Paris story arc. French actor Hugo Becker was cast as Louis Grimaldi, a member of the Monégasque royal family and suitor to Blair.

Although credited, Taylor Momsen (Jenny Humphrey) does not appear in this episode. When discussing Momsen's return to filming in the show, producer and Gossip Girl writer Stephanie Savage stated, "We want to keep it up in the air where her character will go" and hoped to create tension with her absence, also stating that Momsen would return for an episode for the first half of the season. Savage also dispelled rumors that Italo-French songwriter and wife to the President of France, Carla Bruni, would make a guest appearance nor would famous director and producer Woody Allen.

Michael Ausiello of Entertainment Weekly stated that a new love interest for Nate would be cast, confirming rumors that Nate and Serena's relationship has ended. Former Melrose Place star Katie Cassidy joined the cast as Juliet, a student at Columbia University and a potential love interest for Nate, with an agenda against Serena, together with David Call as Ben Donovan, Juliet's imprisoned brother.

News spread that a new love interest for Chuck would be cast. Producers started casting the recurring role of Eva, an utterly gorgeous female in her 20s or 30s who boasts a warm heart and an authentic French accent. Hollywood and media business blog, The Wrap announced that Harry Potter actress Clémence Poésy had been cast as Eva and would be a part of a four episode story arc.

=== Filming locations ===
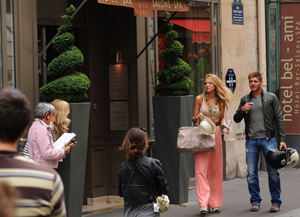
Blake Lively filming in Saint-Germain-des-Prés, Paris, France.

Various news medias announced the fourth season premiere of Gossip Girl would be filmed in Paris. EW's Tim Stack revealed that the show would be filming two episodes in the French capital, anticipated whether it could rival the same Parisian trip that Sex and the City had done years prior and jokingly requested that show stylist Eric Daman dress Leighton Meester in a gown to equal Sarah Jessica Parker's multi-lyered Versace outfit. Archana Ram revealed the new clothes that the show's character would be wearing for the Paris story arc. French magazine Grazia revealed that the show would be shooting at the French University, La Sorbonne in the Latin District (or Quartier Latin) of Paris on July 5, with Clémence Poésy joining the cast in the same filming location. Joe Adalian and Diane Gordon of New York Magazine revealed more filming locations from Musée d'Orsay, the Eiffel Tower, Gare du Nord to Avenue Montaigne. Stephanie Savage stated that Vogue's Fashion's Night Out would be incorporated into the story arc. Leighton Meester and Blake Lively filmed the double date scene at the French restaurant Baccarat.

=== Fashion ===
While filming, Blake Lively commented on the show's fashion for the premiere and her experience of dressing up in Paris. "I feel like just in general, people here dress a little more fabulous [with] things that are a little more old glamor. It's a little bit more glamorous in Paris. You can get away with it." Meester also praised the elevation of the fashions usually seen in the show. "The wardrobe in this show is incredible, but in Paris it's been over-the-top amazing. They just really have taken it to the next level...because we're in Paris and because Blair is starting a new life."

The opening montage features Leighton Meester wearing a printed Moschino frock with Blake Lively dressed in a Georges Chakra couture dress and an Haute Hippie ruffled emerald green wrap dress. Lively was later seen wearing Suno pink palazzo pants while Meester appeared in a pink Oscar de la Renta frock. Meester also wore a Maxime Simoëns dress.

== Cultural allusions ==
The title of the episode comes from the 1967 film Belle de Jour starring French actress Catherine Deneuve, featured French literature, fashion, and art, and pays homage to one of Edith Wharton's novels. Édouard Manet's Le Déjeuner sur l'herbe is featured in the episode and an artistic favorite of Blair when she visits Musée d'Orsay. Gigi penned by novelist Colette is read by Blair in a Parisian park and mentions Serena's infatuation with men wearing Zadig and Voltaire. Juliet is seen reading Wharton's, The House of Mirth at the New York restaurant, Norma's.

== Reception ==
"Belles de Jour" was watched by 1.83 million viewers and achieved a 1.0 in the Adults 18-49 demo. Despite the low ratings, the premiere received generally favorable reviews from critics. L.J. Gibbs, from Tv Fanatic, gave the episode 4.5 stars out of 5.0 and praised Michelle Trachtenberg and guest star Katie Cassidy's acting and storylines. Mark O. Estes, from Tv Overmind, also enjoyed the fact that the episode had "explored more adult themes than usual". Gerard McGarry, from Unreality Shout, had said that the season premiere was "brilliant", while Alexis James-Whitehead, from Buzz Focus.com, had said that the episode was "less sizzle than fizzle". A repeat of the season premiere was watched by 0.87 million viewers on October 18, 2010.

Erik Adams assessed the relationship chemistry between Blair and Serena. "Chuck’s survival and new life are set up to be the episode’s big shocker, but I was taken by a different revelation: After Blair decided for the umpteenth time that she was tired of living in Serena’s shadow, it dawned on me that the Serena-Blair relationship is the great, central romance of Gossip Girl. The “will they break it off?” tension between the two characters has informed plenty of plots and multi-episode arcs in the series’ past, but “Belles du Jour” truly let that relationship breathe as it built momentum toward the next episode. It also paid off in one of the show's best punch lines in a long time, as Blair's bitchy, entitled nature boiled to the surface and plunged Serena into a fountain. Adams praised the casting of Cassidy and the character of Juliet having "[...]the most intriguing hand to reveal in coming episodes. Introduced as the cultured, compassionate antidote to the bimbos performing a commercial for Rock Band 3 [...] the character leaves “Belles du Jour” by flashing a cork-board diagram of the main cast's social circle that would leave The Wire's Lester Freamon thoughtfully nodding his head." The closing montage featured Juliet with photos and visual cross references on the Upper East siders, leading fans to speculate if she was Gossip Girl. An interview with the New York Post dispelled rumors when Katie Cassidy jokingly stated that she was not portraying Gossip Girl but understood how the episode had been set up to make fans assume.
