= The Wrong Goodbye (Gossip Girl) =

- Gossip Girl episode
- Episode no.: Season 4 Episode 22
- Directed by: Patrick Norris
- Written by: Joshua Safran
- Production code: 422
- Original air date: May 16, 2011

Guest appearances
- Zuzanna Szadkowski as Dorota Kishlovsky; Connor Paolo as Eric van der Woodsen; Margaret Colin as Eleanor Waldorf Rose; Michelle Trachtenberg as Georgina Sparks; Michael Boatman as Russell Thorpe; Tika Sumpter as Raina Thorpe; Kaylee DeFer as Charlie Rhodes / Ivy; Sheila Kelley as Carol Rhodes; Hugo Becker as Louis Grimaldi; Joanne Whalley as Sophie Grimaldi; Jan Maxwell as Headmistress Queller; Nan Zhang as Kati Farkas; Nicole Fiscella as Isabel Coates; Yin Chang as Nelly Yuki; Ethan Peck as Man on the bench

Episode chronology
← Previous "Shattered Bass"	Next → "Yes, Then Zero"
- Gossip Girl season 4

"The Wrong Goodbye" is the 87th episode of The CW television series Gossip Girl. It is also the 22nd and final episode of the fourth season. The episode was directed by Patrick Norris and the second finale in the series written by Joshua Safran. This also marks the second time that the show filmed a scene in California. "The Wrong Goodbye" aired on the CW in the United States on May 16, 2011, and was viewed live by an audience of 1.36 million Americans. Despite the low ratings, the episode garnered positive reviews from reviewers and critics.

"The Wrong Goodbye" picks up where the previous episode had left off. Chuck Bass (Ed Westwick) looks for a missing Blair Waldorf (Leighton Meester) who has been held hostage by an unstable Russell Thorpe (Michael Boatman). An erratic Charlie Rhodes (Kaylee DeFer) escapes the humiliation of being rejected by Dan Humphrey (Penn Badgley). Serena van der Woodsen (Blake Lively) and Vanessa Abrams (Jessica Szohr) reluctantly join forces after discovering the secret behind Charlie's behavior. Georgina Sparks (Michelle Trachtenberg) unexpectedly turns up at the event looking for trouble.

Jessica Szohr makes her final appearance as Vanessa Abrams; her exit was noted as her highlight of season 4, with many critics praising Szhor's acting in her phone conversation with Dan. This episode also marks Connor Paolo's final appearance as Eric van der Woodsen until the series finale.

== Plot ==
After discovering that Charlie has not been taking her medication, Serena and Vanessa reluctantly team up to find her. Chuck, Nate, Vanessa, and Serena soon encircle Dan, exclaiming that they need something from him. Chuck asks him where Blair is while Serena and Vanessa ask for Charlie's whereabouts. One of Blair's old friends reveals that Blair left the party. While accompanying Chuck to their apartment to look for Blair, Nate confesses that he told Raina (Tika Sumpter) everything behind her mother's death. Chuck reprimands Nate until Raina interrupts them to apologize. Blair is held hostage by Russell in Chuck's hotel. Pretending to escape, she calls Chuck on her phone, revealing her location. Russell explains his reason for kidnapping Blair: to burn down the hotel with her in it. A drunk Charlie is seen dancing wildly until Dan confronts her, but she escapes. Serena greets Headmistress Queller (Jan Maxwell), who expresses her concern with Serena's choice of staying in New York City, having hoped that Serena would find her place outside of the Upper East Side. Georgina offers her aid in their scheme but Dan, Vanessa, and Serena reject her help, going their separate ways to find Charlie.

At Chuck's hotel, Chuck saves Blair while Raina stops her father. With the police arriving, Chuck offers Blair a limo ride, and a homesick Raina breaks up with Nate, intending to return to Chicago. Chuck proposes avoiding the Constance party by going to a bar mitzvah in a similar fashion to Death Takes a Holiday, which Blair accepts. Chuck and Blair have sex while Prince Louis (Hugo Becker) waits for Blair at Constance. While looking for Charlie at the loft, Vanessa spots Dan's novel and reads it. Dan calls her and is upset that she has been reading the novel, which she suggests that he publish despite the possible backlash. Realizing that he no longer cares about writing, Vanessa steals the novel after Dan angrily dismisses her. Serena stops Charlie from jumping off a window and Charlie expresses her envy towards Serena, aspiring to be like her until Serena admits her personal flaws to Charlie, who comforts her. Dan and Nate find Charlie and Serena and return to the party. Charlie makes a suspicious call to her mother and piques Georgina's interest, who gives her her number. Blair finds herself in a dilemma as her feelings for Chuck have resurfaced, arriving at the party to inform Louis of her decision but Chuck interrupts her, informing him that he has their blessing. Blair confronts Chuck for making a decision for her, but the two eventually settle their issues, and he lets her go.

Three weeks later, Blair travels to Monaco to spend the summer with Louis while Serena goes to Montecito, Charlie departs for Miami, Chuck and Nate decide to travel together, and Lily (Kelly Rutherford) tells the family that her house arrest will end by autumn. Dan decides to spend summer in The Hamptons with Eric (Connor Paolo) and tells Rufus (Matthew Settle) that he has moved on from writing. Vanessa has Dan's novel published and leaves for Spain. While in California, Serena runs into a man who has been trying to convert one of her favorite novels into a movie, but finds herself being given a job instead. In Miami, Carol (Sheila Kelley) pays Charlie, who is actually a con artist named Ivy that was hired to gain access to her daughter's trust fund. Ivy's bag shows that she has stolen money from Carol and plans on returning to New York. A later scene shows a positive pregnancy test in a trash can at Blair's bathroom being thrown out by Dorota (Zuzanna Szadkowski).

== Production ==
"The Wrong Goodbye" is the second part of the two-part season finale. Gossip Girl executive producer, Joshua Safran notes that the most important returning character of the show was Georgina Sparks and discussed working on a two-part season finale for the first time on the show.

"I think that it's really fun. It's always fun to have Georgina around. She justs stirs the pot in a major way. She sort of threads through all the major stories [...] sort of like a witness until she injects herself. And of course, returning to Constance, you can't return without Georgina.[...] So a lot of things are in play and a lot of things are happening [...], since we've never done a two-parter before, we wanted to load the gun with as many bullets as possible."

Following her role in Green Lantern, news surfaced of Blake Lively leaving the show to further her acting career in Hollywood. IOL notes "Despite all talk of career trajectories and fanbase, Blake insists her choices are made through far simpler criteria and when asked about playing in a comic-book film says: 'It’s not really a suitable question because the decisions I make on parts come from a more emotional place. It has to be a character I connect with or someone I can have empathy with.'" New York Magazine and various media periodicals have also noted the possibility of Lively leaving the show. Serena and Georgina's dresses were designed by Jenny Packham and Marchesa, respectively. Blair wore an Alexis Mabille dress while Chuck wore a Ralph Lauren suit.

=== Casting ===
Oscar-nominated director David O. Russell made a cameo appearance in the show. Actor Ethan Peck reportedly landed a role in the show. Both stars were seen filming with Blake Lively in California. Peck made his debut in the season finale together with Russell. Tony Award-winning actress Jan Maxwell reprised her role as Headmistress Queller for the season finale. Hugo Becker remained ambiguous on whether he would be joining the series as a recurring or regular cast member during an interview with Zap2it, stating "the answer is in the finale." and hinted the possibility of a recurring role. Cecily von Ziegesar makes a cameo appearance during the finale and filmed her scenes with Lively.

=== Music ===
The Airborne Toxic Event made a special appearance as the band for the Constance Billard Alumni party, playing the song "Changing" from their sophomore album, All at Once. The band announced that they would performing in the finale on their website.

== Reception ==
"The writers really could have messed up this relationship, delivering B right back into the hands of an erratic alcoholic with a history of abuse. In a perfect, feminist world, Blair might have been the one to realize she couldn't be with Chuck. But, although the ending isn't ideal, I'm at least satisfied that the "Gossip Girl" team realized it was too soon to reunite this toxic couple."

— Judy Berman on the writer's direction of Chuck and Blair's relationship.

The Wrong Goodbye received positive reviews from critics and garnered an audience of 1.36 million viewers. New York Magazine drew out the references from past seasons and commented on how the season finale was written. "The Last Episode of the Fourth Season of the Greatest Show of Our Time felt in many ways like it might have been written to end the series, what with the many This Is Your Life moments (such as the return of Georgina Sparks and Blair's old minions Izzy and Kati), the wry references to episodes past, the wrapping up of story lines (including the revelation that Dan has been secretly novelizing his observations of the Upper East Side for the entire time we've thought we've "known" him), and the meaningful departure of its most marketable star to none other than Hollywood." Critical praise went to the storyline twist behind Charlie's identity, citing her as "the big “shocker” of the Gossip Girl finale" and the cameo appearance of Gossip Girl author, Cecily von Ziegesar. Television Without Pity included the episode in its gallery of "Season Finales 2011: The Best and Worst", declaring the finale as one of the best and stating that it "had a lot of storylines pay off" and "was our own little version of a fairy tale."

Television Without Pity and Steve Marsi of TV Fanatic praised the return of Georgina, stating "Michelle had some of the show's funniest dialogue in a long time. She and Jack Bass have really made the last two weeks for me. It was great to have her back." When reviewing the final scene, Marsi commended the appearance of the positive pregnancy test to the audience, calling it "Quite the cliffhanger to leave us with after a finale that was already pretty darn entertaining. The show went out on a high note and next season could be even better." New York Magazine commented on the pregnancy test, insisting that "we’re pretending that positive pregnancy test didn’t exist."

The Los Angeles Times' Judy Berman praised the finale, stating "[...] this year went out with a bang. I had my doubts and reservations, largely concerning Blair and Chuck, but I am surprised and pleased to report that I found the end of "Gossip Girl" Season 4 both exciting and satisfying." The return of Georgina Sparks was well-received as with Serena's development, with Berman citing Serena's confession with Charlie before she could plunge to her death. "This debacle, along with the events of this season in general, seems to have given S some perspective. Friends, she apologizes to Nate and Dan for leading them on and confesses to Charlie that her decision-making skills leave something to be desired! Even if lazy writing results in Serena falling into old habits next season, it's a pretty gratifying moment." Berman also questioned Vanessa's motive behind publishing Dan's novel "[...]it's impossible to know whether she's trying to do her old friend one last favor or profit from stirring up more drama in his life. Considering that Jessica Szohr won't be returning to the show in the fall, we may never find out." Berman also complimented the casting of director David O Russell calling it "one of the show's most delightfully random cameos ever". New York Magazine labeled Chuck and Blair's relationship as the "Longest-Delayed Breakup" of the season, adding that "the big news was that Blair and Prince Louis are somehow still together and engaged, with the wedding scheduled for November sweeps. We feel comfortable assuming that by then, Chuck will have regrouped enough to break things up more definitively."
