= Ron Fortunato =

American cinematographer

- Occupations: Film cinematographer, television cinematographer, television director
- Years active: 1989–present

Ron Fortunato is an American film and television cinematographer and a television director. His credits include Nil by Mouth, Before the Devil Knows You're Dead, Sunset Strip, Hachiko: A Dog's Story and 100 Centre Street. From 2009 to 2010, he directed two episodes of Gossip Girl. He has been a member of the American Society of Cinematographers since 1998.

In 2001, he was nominated for Outstanding Cinematography for a Multi-Camera Series at the Primetime Emmy Awards for his work on 100 Centre Street.
