= Juliet Sharp =

- Gossip Girl character
- Katie Cassidy as Juliet Sharp
- First appearance: "Belles de Jour" (episode 4.01)
- Last appearance: "New York, I Love You XOXO" (episode 6.10)
- Created by: Stephanie Savage
- Portrayed by: Katie Cassidy

In-universe information
- Nickname: Jules
- Occupation: Socialite; College student Charity volunteer
- Family: Cynthia Sharp (mother); Ben Donovan (older half-brother); Colin Forrester (cousin)
- Birthplace: Connecticut

Juliet Sharp is a recurring character who exclusively appeared in the Gossip Girl television adaptation. The character was created by Gossip Girl producer Stephanie Savage and is portrayed by actress Katie Cassidy. The series portrays her as a scheming and secretive but caring woman who develops into a formidable antagonist as her agenda against Serena van der Woodsen progressed. The actions of character has drawn comparisons to another villain of Gossip Girl, Georgina Sparks, and received positive reviews for her inclusion in the series. Juliet only appears during the first half of the fourth season, though she returns in the series finale.

== Television series ==
=== Casting ===
Prior to the premiere of the fourth season, former Melrose Place star Katie Cassidy joined the cast as Juliet, a student at Columbia University and a potential love interest for Nate, with an agenda against Serena.

=== Season 4 ===
Juliet was introduced in the fourth season as the primary antagonist to Serena.

=== Season 6 ===
On October 12, 2012, it was reported that Cassidy would reprise her role as Juliet in the Gossip Girl series finale. Her brief cameo featured her, once suspected of being Gossip Girl herself, reacting with astonishment to the revelation of Gossip Girl's true identity.

== Reception ==
"I didn't actually read that into it until I actually saw it on TV and how they set it up. I can see why people would think that."

—Katie Cassidy on fans thinking she was Gossip Girl.

During the fourth season premiere, The A.V. Club' Erik Adams praised the casting of Cassidy and the character of Juliet having "the most intriguing hand to reveal in coming episodes. Introduced as the cultured, compassionate antidote to the bimbos performing a commercial for Rock Band 3 [...] the character leaves 'Belles du Jour' by flashing a cork-board diagram of the main cast's social circle that would leave The Wire's Lester Freamon thoughtfully nodding his head." Steve Marsi of TV Fanatic commended her addition to the cast, stating, "There's chemistry between them, but is it all part of some devious plan to ruin Nate ... or Serena? The final shot of Juliet's bulletin board was awesome. We thought for a split second that she just might be Gossip Girl herself. While that might be a stretch, Juliet is clearly plotting something elaborate and we're hooked on her." An interview with the New York Post dispelled rumors when Cassidy jokingly stated that she was not portraying Gossip Girl but understood how the episode had been set up to make fans assume.

Judy Berman of the Los Angeles Times labeled her as "the season's most mysterious schemer" and commended how "her true goal remains the biggest mystery of the season so far." With the airing of the mid-season finale, "The Townie", Berman declared her role in Serena's storyline as "the best of the season".

Following the airing of the Thanksgiving episode, "Gaslit", Steve Marsi of TV Fanatic named her "one of the best villains in Gossip Girl history". Her actions in the episode have earned her notoriety that New York magazine's Vulture set a poll on whether Georgina or Juliet was the more devious character, stating, "Never before has anyone on Gossip Girl challenged Georgina for sheer evilness, but in last night's episode, Juliet stepped up."
