= Joe Lazarov =

American television director and producer

- Born: Memphis, Tennessee, U.S.
- Occupation(s): Television director, television producer
- Years active: 1987–present

Joe Lazarov is an American television director and producer.

He began his professional career working as production assistant on television commercials. In 1987, he worked as a post-production supervisor on the series Northern Exposure, before being promoted as associate producer in 1992. For much of the 1990s and 2000s, he worked as a producer and supervising producer on the series New York Undercover, Spy Game, The Agency, Threat Matrix, NCIS: Naval Criminal Investigative Service, The Mountain, Invasion, Psych and Gossip Girl. He made his directorial debut on the latter series in 2008.

He is from Memphis, Tennessee and is alum of Boston University.
