= Amanda Setton =

American actress (born 1985)

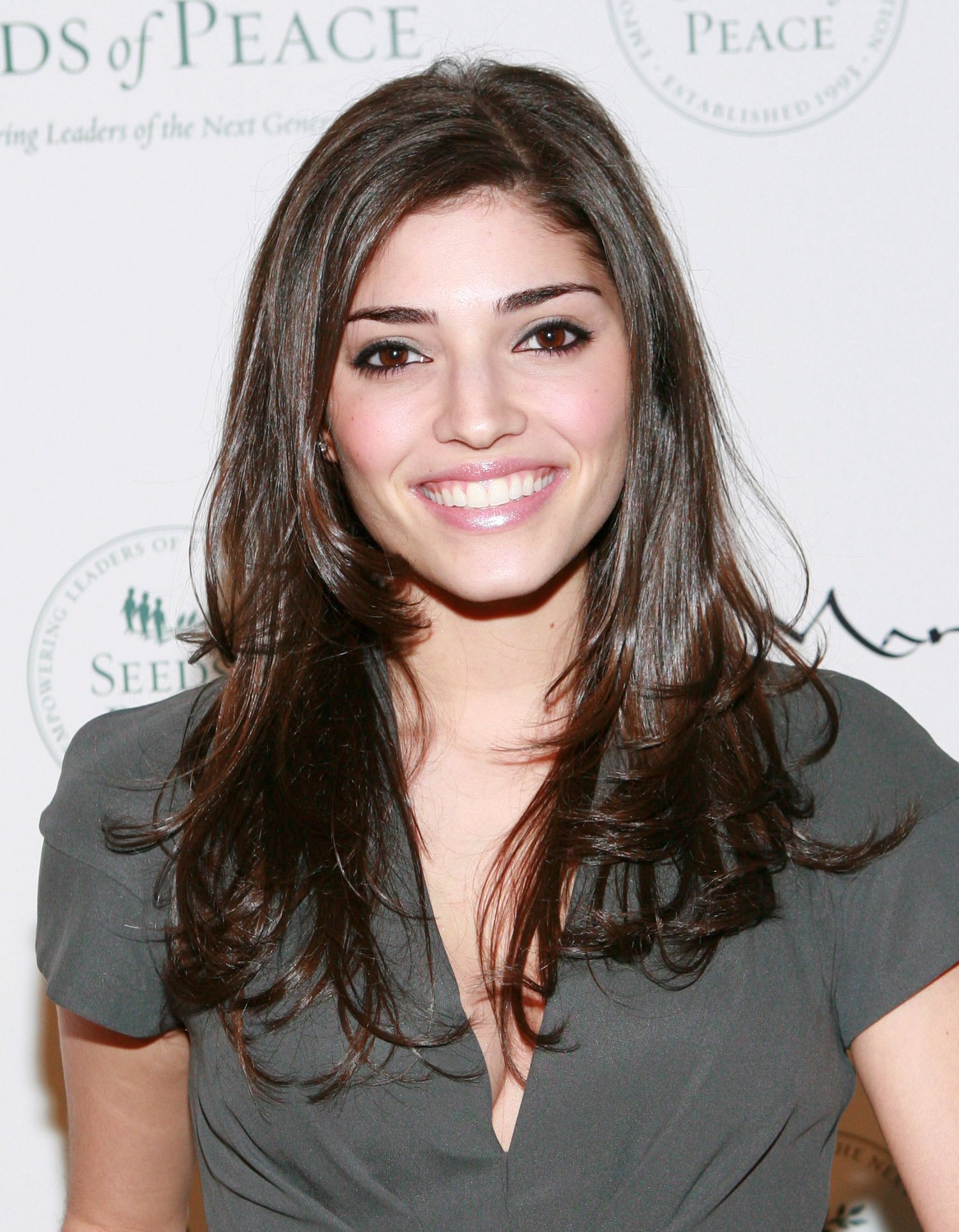
- Setton in February 2009
- Born: December 16, 1985 (age 40); New York City, U.S.
- Occupation: Actress
- Years active: 2005–present
- Children: 3

Amanda Setton (born December 16, 1985) is an American actress. She is known for her recurring role as Penelope Shafai on The CW's teen drama Gossip Girl (2008–2012), for her role as Kimberly Andrews on the ABC soap opera One Life to Live (2009–2011) and as Brook Lynn Quartermaine on the ABC soap opera General Hospital (2019–present). For the latter role, she received a Daytime Emmy Award nomination for Outstanding Supporting Actress in a Drama Series in 2026. She made her Off-Broadway debut in the comedy play Love, Loss, and What I Wore in late 2011 and was on the first half of season one of the Fox comedy The Mindy Project.

== Early life ==
Setton was born in New York City and grew up in Great Neck, where she was vice president of her high school's theater club. She is of Syrian-Jewish ancestry on her father's side and Ashkenazi Jewish on her mother's side. Setton majored in drama at Ithaca College, where she graduated in 2007. In her junior year she studied abroad in Barcelona, Spain in an IES program. Setton completed a comprehensive, two-year Meisner technique program at The Actor's Workshop of Ithaca under the instruction of Eliza VanCort.

== Career ==
Setton played Penelope Shafai on the teen drama Gossip Girl from 2008 to 2012. She made her debut on the ABC soap opera One Life to Live as Kimberly Andrews on August 14, 2009. Setton also had small roles in the 2008 films Sex and the City and What Happens in Vegas. The website Daytime Confidential reported on February 21, 2010, that Setton had taped her last episode as Kim on One Life to Live despite being offered a contract and a pay increase.

Setton returned to Gossip Girl in 2010. In April of 2011, she had a heartbreaking role on the 18th episode during the first season of Blue Bloods. It was announced on June 22, 2011, that Setton would be returning to One Life to Live as Kimberly Andrews in August 2011. On July 11, 2012, Setton was cast as a series regular on the Fox comedy series The Mindy Project, playing the role of Shauna Dicanio. However, it was reported on November 20, 2012, that her character would be written out of the show. Setton had a guest role on the pilot episode of the CBS crime drama series Golden Boy, which premiered February 26, 2013, the same day that Setton was cast in the CBS sitcom The Crazy Ones. She portrayed Dr. Mindy Shaw during the fifth season of Hawaii Five-0.

In 2019, she was cast in the role of Brook Lynn Ashton on General Hospital.. She was recruited to the job without an audition by GH Execitive Producer Frank Valentini, who was also her boss on One Life to Live.

== Personal life ==
Setton is married, and has three children.

== Filmography ==
=== Film ===
Year	Title	Role	Notes
2005	Surrendering Serendipity: A Rock Opera	The God	Short film
2008	What Happens in Vegas	Hot Woman	
2008	Sex and the City	Girl Slapping Guy	
2008	All the World's a Stage	Director's Assistant	
2012	Pasolini's Last Words	Carlo I / Signora Xxx	Documentary film
2014	That Thing with the Cat	Erica	
2015	Black Dog, Red Dog	Aazeen	
2017	That Thing with the Cat!	Erica	
2018	Birth of a Poet	Aazeen	Short film

=== Television ===
Year	Claim	Role	Notes
2008–2012	Gossip Girl	Penelope Shafai	Recurring role; 31 episodes
2009–2011	One Life to Live	Kimberly Andrews	Contract: August 14, 2009 – April 2, 2010; Recurring: August 22 – December 29, 2011
2010	Mercy	Barb	2 episodes (1 uncredited)
2011	Blue Bloods	Sylvia	Episode: "To Tell the Truth"
2012–2013	The Mindy Project	Shauna Dicanio	Main role (Season 1); 12 episodes
2013	Golden Boy	Gemma Bar-Lev	Episode: "Pilot"
2013–2014	The Crazy Ones	Lauren Slotsky	Main cast; 22 episodes
2014–2015	Hawaii Five-0	Dr. Mindy Shaw	Recurring role; 6 episodes
2016	Beauty & the Beast	Bootsy Durbrige	Episode: "Beast Interrupted"
2019–present	General Hospital	Brook Lynn Quartermaine	Series regular

== Awards and nominations ==
List of awards and nominations
Year	Award	Category	Work	Result	Ref.
2026	Daytime Emmy Award	Outstanding Supporting Actress in a Drama Series	General Hospital	Nominated	
