= Katie Cassidy =

American actress (born 1986)

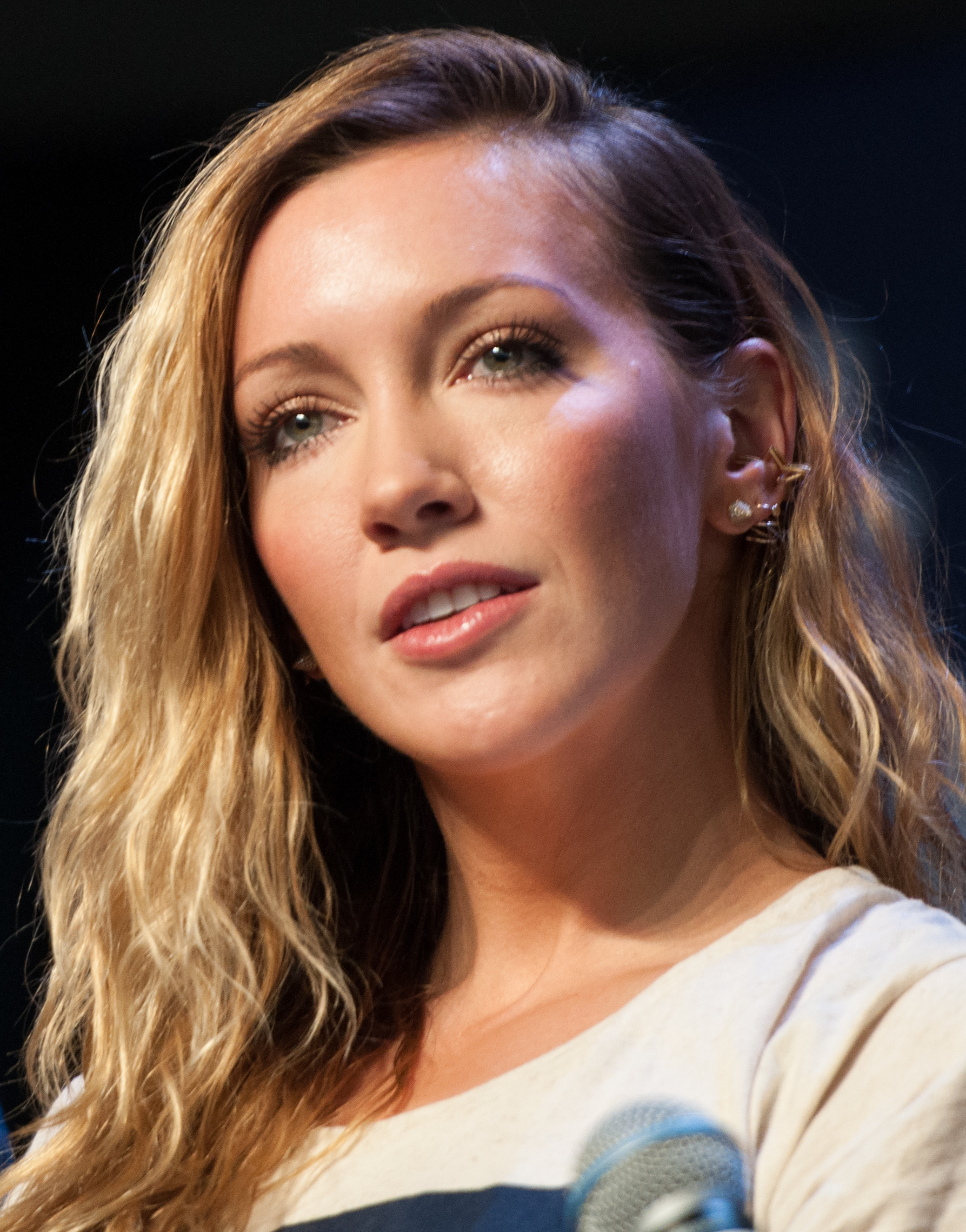
- Cassidy in 2016
- Born: Katherine Evelyn Anita Cassidy; November 25, 1986 (age 39); Los Angeles, California, U.S.
- Occupation: Actress
- Years active: 2003–present
- Spouse: Matthew Rodgers (m. 2018; div. 2021)
- Father: David Cassidy
- Relatives: Jack Cassidy (paternal grandfather); Evelyn Ward (paternal grandmother); Shaun Cassidy (paternal uncle); Patrick Cassidy (paternal uncle)

Katherine Evelyn Anita Cassidy (born November 25, 1986) is an American actress. Following several minor television roles, she came to attention as a scream queen after starring in the horror films When a Stranger Calls (2006), as Kelli Presley in Black Christmas (2006) and as Ruby in the third season of the horror series Supernatural (2007–2008). Following a supporting role in the action film Taken (2008), Cassidy played leading roles in the slasher series Harper's Island (2009) and the remake of the drama series Melrose Place (2009–2010). She starred as Kris Fowles in the slasher film remake A Nightmare on Elm Street (2010) and had a recurring role as Juliet Sharp during the fourth season of the teen drama Gossip Girl (2010–2012).

Cassidy had her breakthrough in 2012, after being cast as Laurel Lance / Black Canary, on The CW television series Arrow. Cassidy has reprised her role in the Arrowverse series The Flash and Legends of Tomorrow, as well as voicing the character in the animated web series Vixen. Following her character's death in season four of Arrow, Cassidy began playing Laurel Lance / Black Siren, an antagonistic version of the character from a parallel universe, originating on The Flash and continuing on to Arrow.

== Early life and family ==
Cassidy was born on November 25, 1986, in Los Angeles, California. She is the only child of actor and singer David Cassidy and fashion model Sherry Williams. Cassidy's paternal grandparents were actors Jack Cassidy and Evelyn Ward and she is the niece of teen idol and television producer Shaun Cassidy, actor Patrick Cassidy and Ryan Cassidy. Cassidy has a younger half-brother named Beau, born in 1991, from her father's third marriage to Sue Shifrin. She also has two younger half-sisters, Jenna and Jamie, from her mother's marriage to Richard Benedon and seven cousins including Samantha Cassidy, Jasmine Cassidy and Chelsea Cassidy who live in Australia.

After Cassidy's parents ended their relationship, she was raised by her mother and stepfather. David Cassidy spoke of his absence from Katie's life, saying in February 2017: "I've never had a relationship with her. I wasn't her father. I was her biological father but I didn't raise her. She has a completely different life. I'm proud of her. She's very talented. It's hard for me to even accept how old she is now." In her youth, Cassidy was on the competitive cheerleader team the California Flyers. A resident of Bell Canyon, California, she attended Calabasas High School. During her time there, she signed a recording contract, releasing a cover of "I Think I Love You", a song which had been a hit for her biological father as part of the soundtrack to his TV show The Partridge Family.

== Acting career ==
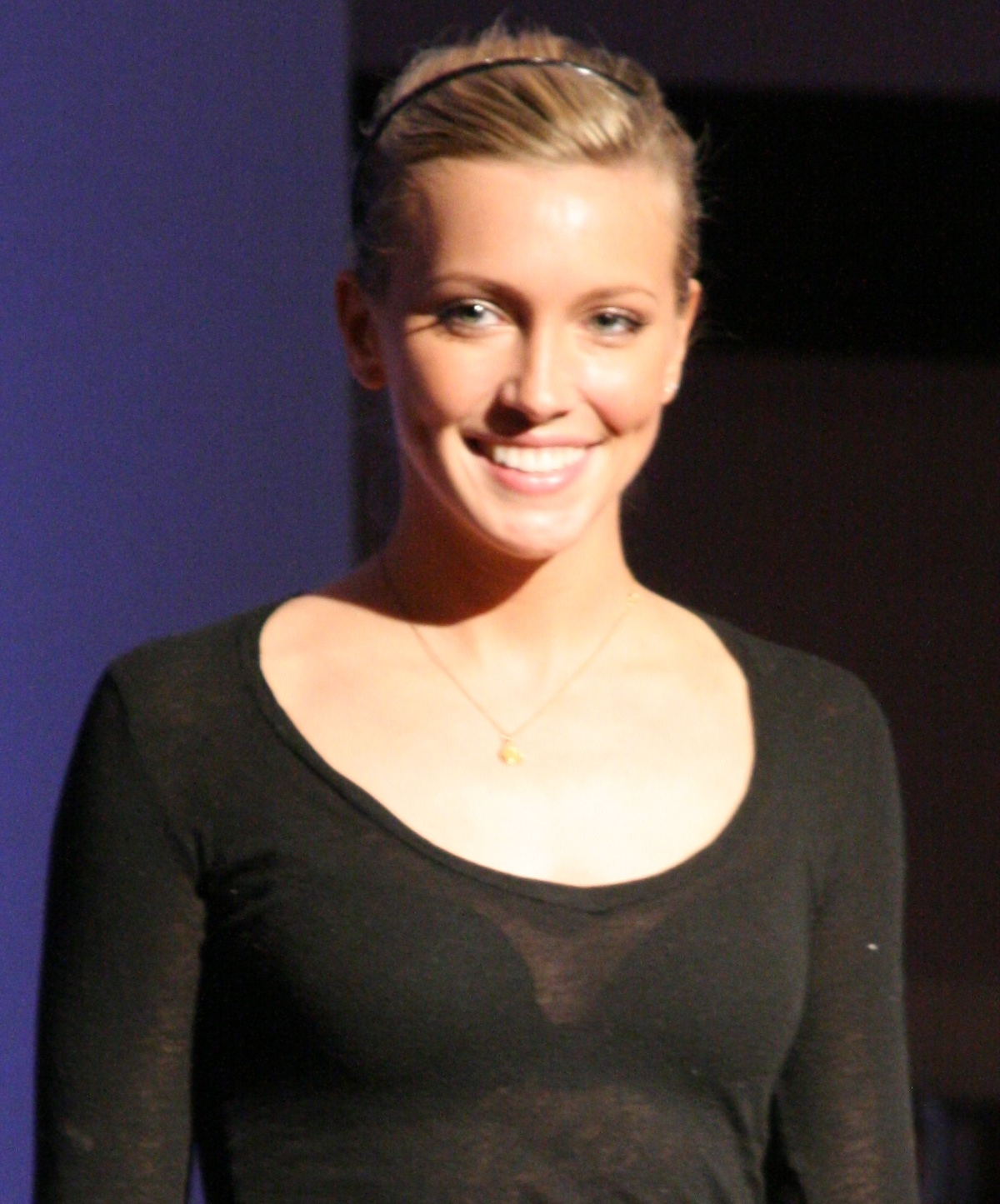
Cassidy in 2008

In 2003, Cassidy made her television and acting debut appearing in an episode of the Lifetime drama series The Division. Cassidy has continued to guest appear in television shows such as Celebrity Apprentice 4, Listen Up and New Girl. In 2005, Cassidy appeared in a recurring role on The WB's series 7th Heaven throughout four episodes. That same year, she also appeared on the UPN (now The CW) teen drama series Sex, Love & Secrets.

In 2006, Cassidy made her film debut as Tiffany Madison in the horror film When a Stranger Calls. Cassidy has gone on to have notable supporting roles in films Click, Taken and Live!.

In February 2006, Cassidy was cast as Kelli Presley in the Dimension Films horror-slasher film Black Christmas, a remake of the 1974 film. The film centers on an escaped maniac who returns to his childhood home on Christmas Eve, which is now a sorority house, and one by one kills all of the sorority sisters. The film was released on December 15, 2006 to negative reviews from critics. The film was a moderate success, making over $50 million worldwide.

In 2007, Cassidy appeared on The CW's supernatural drama series Supernatural. Cassidy played the role of Ruby, a demon. Making her debut in the show's third season, Cassidy appeared in six episodes. In 2008, though her character returned for the show's fourth season, Cassidy was replaced by actress Genevieve Cortese.

In October 2008, Variety announced Cassidy had been cast on the CBS horror mystery limited series Harper's Island. Cassidy portrayed the role of Patricia "Trish" Wellington, a bride-to-be. The series centered on a group of family and friends who gather for a wedding on an island known for its sinister past full of gruesome murders. In each episode, at least one character is killed off. Cassidy and her fellow cast members were not told about their characters' deaths until the day they received a script. The series premiered on April 9, 2009, to 10.21 million viewers. Despite ratings failing to maintain the pilot's success, CBS aired the remainder of the series with the series finale airing on July 11, 2009.

In February 2009, The CW cast Cassidy as a lead in the drama series Melrose Place, a reboot of the 1990s series of the same name. Cassidy portrayed the role of Ella Simms, a publicist who resides in a West Hollywood apartment complex and centers on its residents. The series premiered on September 8, 2009 to 2.31 million viewers. Despite mixed reviews, Cassidy's performance was praised by critics and was cited as "the best thing about the Melrose reboot" by New York magazine. The CW canceled the series in May 2010 due to low ratings.

In April 2010, Cassidy appeared in another remake; this time the horror classic A Nightmare on Elm Street, originally released in 1984 of the same name. Cassidy portrays the false protagonist Kris Fowles; a high school student who becomes a victim to Freddy Krueger. Filming began in Chicago with the film earning over $31 million in its opening weekend. Cassidy was nominated for a Teen Choice Award in the Horror/Thriller Actress category for her role, which she lost to Megan Fox. Cassidy's work in the horror genre has led to her being labelled a Scream Queen.

Shortly after the release of A Nightmare on Elm Street, Variety announced Cassidy had been cast in the adventure comedy film Monte Carlo. The film, which also stars Leighton Meester and Selena Gomez, follows three friends who pose as wealthy socialites while on holiday in Monte Carlo. Production began in May 2010 with filming taking place in Monaco, Budapest, Paris, and Texas. The film was released on July 1, 2011 and received mixed to negative reviews from critics, and went on to gross $39 million worldwide.

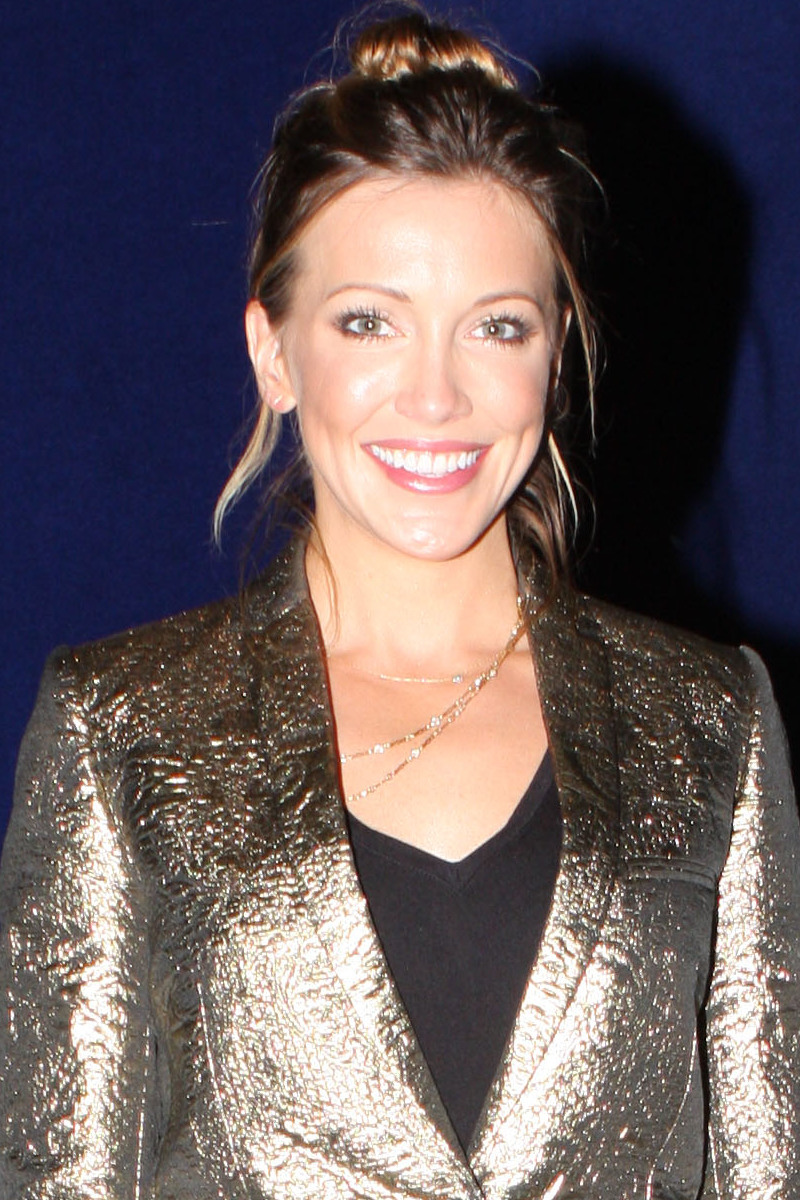
Cassidy at Australia's Supanova Expo in 2014

In June 2010, The CW announced Cassidy would have a major recurring arc in the fourth season of the teen drama series Gossip Girl. Cassidy portrayed Juliet Sharp, who attends Columbia University and sets out to ruin the life of the show's central character Serena van der Woodsen. Cassidy made her first appearance in the season premiere and went on to appear in over 11 episodes of the season.

In May 2012, Cassidy was cast as the title character in the film adaptation of the graphic novel The Scribbler, alongside Eliza Dushku, Michelle Trachtenberg and Gina Gershon. She plays Suki, a young woman with dissociative identity disorder.

In March 2011, Cassidy was cast in the ABC drama pilot Georgetown as Nikki, a smart and quick-witted junior staffer in the White House Communications Office with connections to the First Lady. The pilot was created by Gossip Girl executive producers Josh Schwartz and Stephanie Savage. The series was not picked up by ABC.

In February 2012, Cassidy landed the main cast role of Laurel Lance / Black Canary in The CW's series Arrow, which is based on the Green Arrow comic books. The series premiered on October 10, 2012. Cassidy left the show as a series regular after her character was killed off in episode 18 of the fourth season on April 6, 2016. On May 17, 2016, she guest-starred in the Arrow verse spin-off series The Flash for the second time, but as the metahuman Black Siren, Laurel's Earth-2 doppelgänger, in the second-season episode "Invincible". On July 23, 2016, it was announced that Cassidy had signed a deal with Warner Bros. to appear across multiple CW Arrowverse shows. On March 27, 2017, it was announced that Cassidy would return to Arrow as a series regular for season 6; reprising the role of Black Siren. She continued in that role for the remaining duration of the show. The season 8 episode "Leap of Faith" marked her directorial debut.

In 2016, Cassidy portrayed the character of Sharon (a character inspired by late fashion model and actress Sharon Tate) in the direct-to-digital-HD horror film Wolves at the Door, loosely based on the Manson Family's murders.

Cassidy also stars in the 2017 PS4 game Hidden Agenda.

== Personal life ==
Cassidy is a spokeswoman for the charity H.E.L.P. Malawi.

In 2016, Cassidy began dating Matthew Rodgers. The couple announced their engagement on June 5, 2017. Cassidy and Rodgers wed on December 8, 2018. Cassidy filed for divorce on January 8, 2020, in Los Angeles. The divorce was finalized on March 22, 2021, and it became public on March 26.

Since March 2023, Cassidy has been in a relationship with Canadian actor Stephen Huszar. The two had met on the set of the Hallmark Channel movie A Royal Christmas Crush.

== Filmography ==
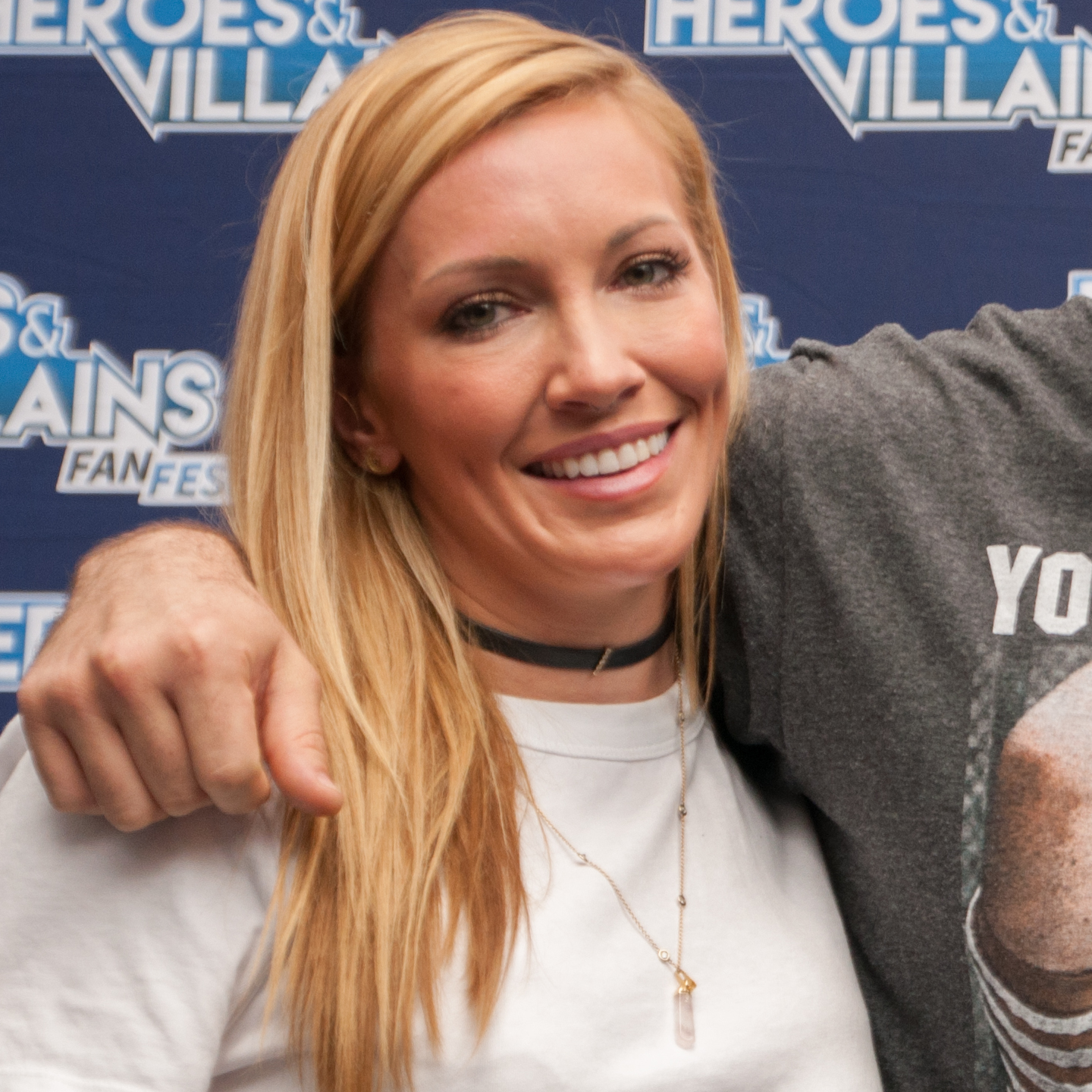
Cassidy in May 2017

=== Film ===
Year	Title	Role	Notes
2006	When a Stranger Calls	Tiffany Madison	
2006	The Lost	Dee Dee	
2006	Click	Samantha Newman at 18 and 27 years old	
2006	Black Christmas	Kelli Presley	
2007	Spin	Apple	
2007	Live!	Jewel	
2007	Walk the Talk	Jessie	
2008	Taken	Amanda	
2010	A Nightmare on Elm Street	Kris Fowles	
2011	Monte Carlo	Emma Perkins	
2013	Kill for Me	Amanda Rowe	
2014	The Scribbler	Suki	
2016	Wolves at the Door	Sharon Tate	
2018	Grace	Dawn Walsh	
2018	Cover Versions	Jackie	
2021	I Love Us	Laura Fenton	Also executive producer
2022	Agent Game	CIA Operative Miller	
2026	Speed Demon	Sister Lu	Post-production

=== Television ===
Year	Title	Role	Notes
2003	The Division	Young Candace "CD" DeLorenzo	Episode: "Oh Mother, Who Art Thou?"
2005	Listen Up	Rebecca	Episode: "Snub Thy Neighbor"
2005	7th Heaven	Zoe	4 episodes
2005	Sex, Love & Secrets	Gabrielle	2 episodes
2007–2008	Supernatural	Ruby / Lilith	Main role (season 3) 6 episodes
2009	Harper's Island	Patricia "Trish" Wellington	Main role
2009–2010	Melrose Place	Ella Simms	Main role
2010–2012	Gossip Girl	Juliet Sharp	Recurring role (season 4); guest star (season 6)
2011	New Girl	Brooke	Episode: "Wedding"
2012–2020	Arrow	Laurel Lance / Black Canary / Black Siren (Note: Cassidy also played Laurel Lance / Siren-X, the Earth-X version of Black Canary and Black Siren in the episode "Fury Rogue" of the fourth season of The Flash.)	Main role (seasons 1–4; 6–8); (Note: Also credited as "Katie Cassidy Rodgers" season 7) (Note: Although billed as a "special appearance" in season 8, Cassidy is still considered a series regular for the season.) recurring (season 5)
2015–2018	The Flash	Laurel Lance / Black Canary / Black Siren	3 episodes
2015	Superhero Fight Club	Laurel Lance / Black Canary	The CW short
2016	Whose Line Is It Anyway?	Herself	Episode: "Katie Cassidy"
2016–2017	Legends of Tomorrow	Laurel Lance	2 episodes
2023	A Royal Christmas Crush	Ava Jensen	Hallmark Channel TV Movie
2026	Accused: The Karen Read Story	Karen Read	Lifetime TV Movie

=== Music videos ===
Year	Artist	Title	Notes
2004	Eminem	"Just Lose It"	
2005	Jesse McCartney	"She's No You"	

=== Other media ===
Year	Title	Role	Notes
2016	Vixen	Laurel Lance / Black Canary	Web series; voice role; 3 episodes
2017	Hidden Agenda	Becky Marney	Video game; voice/motion capture role

=== As a director ===
- Arrow – episode: "Leap of Faith" (2019)

== Awards and nominations ==
Year	Award	Category	Nominated work	Result
2010	Fright Meter Award	Best Supporting Actress	A Nightmare on Elm Street	Nominated
2010	Teen Choice Awards	Choice Movie Actress: Horror/Thriller	A Nightmare on Elm Street	Nominated
2013	Teen Choice Awards	Choice TV Actress: Fantasy/Sci-Fi	Arrow	Nominated
2015	PRISM Award	Performance in a Drama Series Multi-Episode Storyline	Arrow	Won
2018	FirstGlance Film Fest Philadelphia	Best Actress (Feature)	Grace	Won
