= Eric van der Woodsen =

- Gossip Girl character
- Connor Paolo as Eric van der Woodsen
- First appearance: Novel: Gossip Girl; Television: "Pilot" (episode 1.01)
- Last appearance: Novel: I Will Always Love You; Television: "New York, I Love You XOXO" (episode 6.10)
- Created by: Character: Cecily von Ziegesar; Developed for television: Josh Schwartz; Stephanie Savage
- Portrayed by: Connor Paolo

In-universe information
- Full name: Eric van der Woodsen
- Alias: E J
- Occupation: Novels: College student (at Brown); Television: High school student (at St. Jude's; graduated); College student (at Sarah Lawrence College)
- Family: William van der Woodsen (father); Lily van der Woodsen (mother); Serena van der Woodsen (sister); Television: Bart Bass (former step-father); Rufus Humphrey (step-father); Scott Rosson (maternal half-brother); Chuck Bass (adoptive step-brother); Dan Humphrey (former step-brother/brother-in-law); Jenny Humphrey (former step-sister); Rick and CeCe Rhodes (maternal grandparents)
- Spouses: Television: Jonathan Whitney (husband)
- Relatives: Carol Rhodes (maternal aunt); Lola Rhodes (three-quarter sister)

Eric van der Woodsen (spelled Erik in the novels) is a fictional character from the book series Gossip Girl and the television series of the same name, in which he is portrayed by Connor Paolo.

== Novel series ==
Erik is described as similar to every van der Woodsen: thin, and blonde. The elder brother of Serena van der Woodsen, Erik van der Woodsen is not featured in the books very often. A junior at Brown University, Serena has said he has "at least six or seven different girlfriends he sleeps with routinely." On a trip to Sun Valley, Erik and Serena's best friend Blair Waldorf dated briefly.

Very close to his sister, Erik threw her a giant sweet sixteenth birthday bash and drove her up to Hanover on her first day of school there. Aside from his brief appearances, Erik remained a relatively quiet secondary character throughout the series; however, he did have a bigger part in the Gossip Girl prequel, Gossip Girl: It Had to Be You.

== TV series ==
=== Characterization ===
In contrast to the novels, Eric's character is more complex in the show, showing a mature understanding of family and relationships but faces the same troubles as most teenagers have. Alessandra Stanley of The New York Times mentions his character's deviation from the novels from "an object of female lust" to one of "...psychotherapy", but notes his strong bond with Serena, stating how he "is misunderstood by all but his caring, if troubled, sister." Despite his mature persona, Eric is no stranger to the problems that most teens face as his stay at the Ostroff Center, a rehabilitation facility, is a result of his constant loneliness and his mother's many unstable marriages. Connor Paolo notes that Eric's lack of a father figure contributed to his suicide attempt.

=== Season 1 ===
At the beginning of the season, Eric has been living at the Ostroff Center, a high-class mental facility. Serena frequently visits him after coming back. As well as trying to convince the doctors and her mother Lilly to let him out. They let Eric out temporarily, during the Ivy League Mixer, where he develops a friendship with Jenny Humphrey. After Blair Waldorf humiliates his sister, telling the whole school she was attending the Ostroff Center during her absence having mistakenly seeing photos of Serena entering the center, Eric tells Blair he was the one attending the mental center and shows her the scars on his wrists from his suicide attempt.

At Blair's annual sleepover, Blair dares Jenny to break into the Ostroff Center and take Eric out for the night. Jenny and Blair succeed and they take him to a bar downtown. Lily is made aware of his disappearance and begins to panic. She quickly informs Rufus, whose son, Dan, is on a date with Serena, after she cannot get hold of her. They contact the couple to make sure Eric is alright and to bring him home. Later, Lily realizes that Eric is ready to come out of the medical center. He is present during Thanksgiving dinner at the Humphrey's apartment when Lily and Rufus reveal they had a previous relationship years ago. Due to his mother's engagement to billionaire Bart Bass, he develops a close friendship with Chuck Bass, whom he soon sees as a brother.

He tries to warn Jenny about her new boyfriend Asher Hornsby (Jesse Swenson) but she mistakes this for Eric being in love with her. In the same episode, Dan and Georgina Sparks see Asher making out with someone outside of school. The news becomes public on Gossip Girl, and Jenny denies the rumor by saying she lost her virginity to Asher, which Eric knows is untrue. During a dinner with his family, Georgina outs him to get back at Serena. Eric's homosexuality upsets Lily, who blames herself for Eric getting institutionalized. Serena comforts him, and learns that Eric already came out to Chuck before her because he knew Chuck wouldn't judge him. He also explains that he had a relationship with someone while at the Ostroff Center, but now believed that it was over. At Asher and Jenny's party, Eric helps Blair dethrone Jenny by revealing that Asher was indeed gay, and that they were involved. Asher denies this, but Blair sends a Gossip Girl blast with Eric and Asher's emails. He and Lily later reconcile.

=== Season 2 ===
During summer 2008, Eric is staying with his sister and grandmother in The Hamptons. He receives a call from Jenny who tells him that she needs help to get in the Vitamin White Party. She apologizes to him about the incident with Asher and they become friends again. Eric introduces Tinsley Mortimer to Jenny to extend her contacts in the fashion industry.

After the school year starts, although Serena complains about Lily's new marriage and their new house rules, Eric thinks they should give the marriage a chance. Later, Eric introduces Jonathan Whitney (Matt Doyle) as his new boyfriend. They break up after Bart tells Eric that Jonathan has been cheating on him. Eric lodges Jenny secretly in the Bass-van der Woodsen penthouse and goes with her to make the paperwork to divorce her parents.

Eric then discovers that Bart hired his private detective, Andrew Tyler, to do research about his, Lily's, and Serena's past. He discovers that Lily was also institutionalized at a French sanatorium and that she didn't tell him so that she could be strong for him. Bart's actions convince Lily to celebrate Thanksgiving with the Humphreys.

After Bart's death, Eric comes back with Jonathan and tries to convince Chuck to go back to their penthouse. Chuck and Eric officially go from close friends to brothers after Lily adopts her late husband's son.

=== Season 3 ===
During summer 2009, Eric is in his grandmother's house with Jenny, Dan, and Rufus while Lily is in Montecito taking care of his and Serena's grandmother, CeCe. He observes Jenny's speech to the rest of Constance that ends the school hierarchy.

During Jenny's gradual transformation as an Upper East Side Queen, he falls victim to Jenny and her cronies when a battle over the steps that Jonathan inadvertently started and ends with Eric being splattered with yogurt. The Halloween party that followed after had Jonathan being egged at the club opening, enraging Eric, who tells Jenny he wants nothing to do with her. Eric sabotages Jenny's Cotillion by falsely sending a text to Graham Collins, the date Jenny wants using her phone which claims that Jonathan will be taking her to Cotillion. He joins forces with Blair, whom Jenny also offends publicly, in making Kira Abernathy, a Constance student whom Jenny regularly ignores, a threat to Jenny's reign as Queen. Blair gives Kira a makeover and Eric blackmails Graham into becoming Kira's escort instead of Jenny. Jenny soon endures public humiliation but manages to gain their respect by taking Nate as her escort for Cotillion. These events cause Jonathan to break up with Eric as he claims Eric has changed now that he's resorted to scheming with Blair. After Cotillion, Jenny leaves with the other Upper East Side Queen Bees and leaves unaware that Eric has been responsible for her public embarrassment.

At Thanksgiving, Jenny discovers that Eric was the one behind her public embarrassment at Cotillion which sets her getting her revenge on him. Eric teams up with Kira and attempts to ruin Jenny by buying one of his accomplices the same bag as her and have the girls turn against her. This fails as Jenny reveals two identical bags handing them over to his accomplices, falsely apologizing for her actions but claiming that one of the girls whom Erica bought a bag for spoiled her surprise. Eric and Jenny then to a truce after Serena's car accident.

It is revealed in "Inglourious Bassterds" that Eric was in Japan and ends up meeting a potential love-interest named Elliot (Luke Kleintank) during a game of assassin on Nate's birthday. On the day of Blair's maid's, Dorota, wedding, Eric wonders if Elliot is gay and discovers that he has a girlfriend during the wedding reception. Elliot then confides in Eric that he is bisexual, indicating that Eric still has a chance with him when Elliot tells him that his girlfriend left out of jealousy.

Eric's relationship with his father, William, is also observed when he coldly rejects him for not being there for him. He informs him that he is gay and had been institutionalized.

His friendship with Jenny is once again tested when she reveals that she aided his father's escape from the police. He coldly states that no one is forcing Jenny to stay and that she can leave if she wants to. Eric is the first to discover that Jenny lost her virginity to Chuck and tries to comfort a dismayed Jenny, who is sent away to finish high school in Hudson.

=== Season 4 ===
In "The Undergraduates", Chuck tries to make amends with Rufus and Eric, by coming to Fashion Week with his new girlfriend, Eva. Eric, however, informs Rufus of Chuck's season 1 assault on Jenny and says that his brother has been given too many chances to redeem himself, signaling the end of their once-close bond.

When Jenny returns to the Upper East Side briefly for an interview with Tim Gunn, Eric attempts to help her make a good impression and keep her away from both Chuck and Blair. Later, he and Dan scheme against Blair and Chuck to get Jenny to come back for their parents' anniversary. The plan fails when Blair and Chuck sign a treaty and come to a truce. After Dan steals the treaty from Nate, Eric backs out of the plan. Eric unknowingly leads his parents to Blair's party where Dan's plan is about to go through, thinking Dan had abandoned the plan.

Eric is present when Serena is admitted to the Ostroff Center. He is proud of her for going, but does not believe her when she denies overdosing. He is also present when Serena confronts Lily.

Pepe angry at his mother for what happened to Ben Donovan and Bass Industries. When man from the Empire calls saying the judge from Ben's case was there, Eric calls Serena, which makes her determined to take Lily down.

In "Damien Darko", it is revealed that Eric and Elliot broke up and he has been lying to his mother about being with Elliot when he has really been with Damien. When Jonathan goes with Eric to the W party, Eric ditches Jonathan to meet up with Damien. However, earlier Ben had seen Eric with Damien and called Serena. When they walk in on Eric and Damien, the two pretend to be couple and Ben lectures Eric about making bad choices. Eric promises not to see Damien anymore. Rufus confronts Eric, asking if he bought drugs from Damien and Eric says he bought some pills, but realizes it was stupid and promises to stop. But while he keeps that promise, when Damien calls Eric after Ben warns him away from Serena's family, Eric agrees to hang out with him.

=== Season 5 ===
Rufus reveals in the season 5 premiere "Yes, Then Zero" that Jenny has moved to London to attend Saint Martins. Eric is attending Sarah Lawrence College. During the episode "Memoirs of an Invisible Dan", it's mentioned that in Dan's semi-autobiographical novel Inside Nate and Eric's literary counterparts were meshed together.

=== Season 6 ===
Eric returns briefly for the series finale. He is shown to be close to Lily and Jenny.

== Reception ==
TVLine's Michael Ausiello had reported that Paolo had originally been offered to become a series regular for the show's second season but declined. "I'm very happy with my position on the show and I have no interest in changing it", and that he may not be ready to face the same challenges as his other castmates, stating, "Watching Blake [Lively] and Penn [Badgley] and the things they have to deal with as [a full-time cast members]... because they are on the posters and they are the face of the show, is not something I'm totally ready for right now."
