= Stephanie Savage =

Canadian screenwriter (born 1969)

- Born: 1969 (age 56–57)
- Occupations: Producer; Screenwriter
- Writing career
- Years active: 2002–present
- Notable works: Fastlane; The O.C. Gossip Girl; Dynasty; Runaways

Stephanie Savage (born 1969) is a screenwriter and television producer from Calgary, Alberta, Canada. Savage is best known for developing The CW's teen drama series Gossip Girl (2007) from the novel series, and being an executive producer of the Fox series The O.C.. In 2010 Savage and creative partner Josh Schwartz created Fake Empire, a production company producing their TV series, films and music.

== Career ==
Savage graduated from the University of Toronto in 1990 with a B.A. in English and Cinema Studies, then from the University of Iowa in 1993 with an M.A. in Film History and Theory. While writing her PhD dissertation for the University of Iowa she moved to Los Angeles, and in 1995 was offered a position at Drew Barrymore's production company Flower Films. Here she dabbled in scriptwriting, handling production rewrites for Charlie's Angels, and met the film's director McG. The two later formed production company Wonderland Sound and Vision in 2001.

In September 2016, Savage was announced as an executive producer for the then-upcoming Dynasty reboot series.

in 2025 it was announced that Savage would co-executive produce a series based on Clueless with Schwartz and Jordan Weiss for Peacock.

== Filmography ==
=== Film ===
Title	Year	Credited as	Notes
Title	Year	Producer	Notes
Charlie's Angels: Full Throttle	2003	Associate	
Endless Love	2011	Yes	
Fun Size	2012	Yes	
No Cameras Allowed	2014	Executive	Documentary

=== Television ===
The numbers in directing and writing credits refer to the number of episodes.

Title	Year	Credited as				Network	Notes
Title	Year	Creator	Director	Writer	Executive Producer	Network	Notes
Fastlane	2002–03	No	No	No	No	Fox	Producer
The O.C.	2003–07	No	No	Yes (12)	Yes	Fox	Supervising producer (Season 1); Co-executive producer (2005–06: 5 episodes); Executive producer (2006: 3 episodes)
The Mountain	2004–05	No	No	Yes (2)	Yes	The WB	
Gossip Girl	2007–12	Developer	No	Yes (12)	Yes	The CW	
Valley Girls	2009	Yes	No	Yes	Yes	The CW	Backdoor pilot: series not picked up; Proposed spin-off to Gossip Girl
Ghost Angeles	2011	No	No	No	Yes	NBC	Unaired television pilot
Georgetown	2011	No	No	No	Yes	ABC	Unaired television pilot
Hart of Dixie	2011–15	No	No	No	Yes	The CW	
The Carrie Diaries	2013–14	No	No	No	Yes	The CW	
Cult	2013	No	No	No	Yes	The CW	
The Astronaut Wives Club	2015	Developer	No	Yes (2)	Yes	ABC	
Broad Squad	2015	No	No	Yes	Yes	ABC	Unaired television pilot
Dynasty	2017–22	Developer	No	Yes (1)	Yes	The CW	
Runaways	2017–19	Yes	No	Yes (3)	Yes	Hulu	
Nancy Drew	2019–2023	Developer	No	Yes (1)	Yes	The CW	
Looking for Alaska	2019	No	No	Yes (2)	Yes	Hulu	Miniseries
Gossip Girl	2021	No	No	No	Yes	HBO Max	
Sterling Point	TBA	No	No	No	Yes	Amazon Prime Video	Post-production

=== Web ===
The numbers in writing credits refer to the number of episodes.

Title	Year	Credited as		Notes
Title	Year	Writer	Executive Producer	Notes
Charlie's Angels: Animated Adventures	2003	Yes (6)	No	
Gossip Girl: Chasing Dorota	2009	No	Yes	

== See also ==
- Fake Empire
- Josh Schwartz
