= Summer, Kind of Wonderful =

- Gossip Girl episode
- Blair asks Chuck to say "I Love You" to her.
- Episode no.: Season 2 Episode 1
- Directed by: J. Miller Tobin
- Written by: Joshua Safran
- Production code: 201
- Original air date: September 1, 2008

Guest appearances
- Connor Paolo as Eric van der Woodsen; Caroline Lagerfelt as Celia "CeCe" Rhodes; Mädchen Amick as Catherine Mason; Michelle Hurd as Laurel; Jay McInerney as Jeremiah Harris

Episode chronology
← Previous "Much 'I Do' About Nothing"	Next → "Never Been Marcused"
- Gossip Girl season 2

"Summer, Kind of Wonderful" is the 19th episode of the CW television series, Gossip Girl, as well as the season premiere of the show's second season. The episode was written by Joshua Safran and directed by J. Miller Tobin. It originally aired on Monday, September 1, 2008, on the CW.

"Summer, Kind of Wonderful" premieres in the Hamptons with the summer nearly drawing to a close. Serena van der Woodsen (Blake Lively) spends the summer attempting to move on from her previous relationship with Dan Humphrey (Penn Badgley), who himself also has trouble moving on to the point that it has affected his internship with a famous author. Chuck Bass (Ed Westwick) awaits the arrival of Blair Waldorf (Leighton Meester) from her European trip but finds her already in a new relationship with James Schuller (Patrick Heusinger) who is hiding his own secrets from Blair. Nate Archibald (Chace Crawford) uses his fake relationship with Serena to conceal his affair with an older, married woman named Catherine Mason (Mädchen Amick) while Jenny Humphrey (Taylor Momsen) finds herself interning at Eleanor Waldorf Designs, subsequently reconciling with Eric van der Woodsen (Connor Paolo) to impress her boss.

== Plot ==
The episode reveals Blair, Serena, Nate and Chuck spending their summer in the Hamptons and opens with Nate having an affair with a woman named Catherine while he and Serena mislead people into thinking that they are together. During one their trysts, Catherine's husband returns home early and she drives Nate out of the house. Barely clothed and running for the street, he runs into Serena and her date and Serena discovers Nate's affair. Nate soon develops feelings for Catherine and arrives with Serena as a date to the White party to make Catherine jealous. Serena helps Nate make her jealous by kissing him in public but is shocked to find a displeased Dan witnessing the entire scene. Serena's plan eventually works for Nate as Catherine becomes jealous and the two sleep with each other during the party.

Chuck is seen spending his summer with other women and prepares to impress Blair by meeting her at the bus stop of the Hamptons jitney, fresh from her travels. Blair returns but is seen with a new man, James, whom Blair uses to make Chuck jealous. During lunch at their Hamptons house, Chuck's attempts to ruin Blair reveals Blair's conflicted feelings for Chuck but chooses not to forgive him after he left her during her travels. In the hopes of getting rid of James, Chuck calls his private investigator to find any information on him. James' origins soon become questionable when he mixes up the college he is enrolled in. During the White party, James tries to confess something to Blair but finds Blair still enamored of Chuck and dismisses her. Blair turns to James to apologize and he confesses that he is of English nobility and reveals his real name to be Marcus Beaton. The revelation stuns Blair and the two continue their relationship. As the White party ends, Chuck attempts to reconcile with Blair but she gives him an ultimatum: to confess his love for her or she'll leave with Marcus. Unable to express his love, Blair leaves the party with Marcus.

Jenny's summer internship under Eleanor Waldorf grows more difficult as Laurel (Michelle Hurd), her supervisor, subjects her to unreasonable amount of work. Jenny apologizes to Eric and makes her way into the White party, impressing Tinsley Mortimer and Laurel, telling her that she is lucky to be working where she already is.

Dan and Serena face the hazards of breaking-up with Serena continuously pining for Dan despite news that she has been seen with Nate. Dan has taken a summer internship under Jeremiah Harris (Jay McInerney) but has been uninspired throughout the summer since his break-up Serena and procrastinates his submission of a story. Dan travels to the Hamptons and is surprised to see CeCe (Caroline Lagerfelt) whose recent illness has given her a change of heart and encourages him to resume his relationship with Serena. At the White party, Dan and Serena resume their old issues as Serena is forced to keep Nate's affair secret, thereby resuming her lying to Dan and Dan faces the problem of dating multiple women at once. The two eventually reconcile as Dan returns to his writing and he and Serena watch the fireworks from a distance on a beach.

== Production ==
Although credited, Kelly Rutherford and Jessica Szohr do not appear in this episode.

=== Filming Locations ===
The second-season premiere primarily filmed in the Hamptons and began filming in mid-June. The majority of the episode was filmed during an elaborate white party. Jeremiah Harris' reading and the scene where Dan is revealed to be dating two girls was filmed at a Housing Works bookstore in SoHo while the Cooper's Beach scenes with Chuck and Serena were filmed at Rockaway Beach.

=== Fashion ===
Gossip Girl costume designer, Eric Daman originally intended to dress Blake Lively in a men's vest but instead dressed her in an iconic Grecian gown coupled with a metallic chain headpiece after conflicts regarding the appearance of the vest when viewed via camera occurred. For the scene at a garden dinner party, Daman fitted Ed Westwick with a light green suit with hydrangea and cabbage rose tones in his shirt and tie selection. Daman considered the experience as "[a] perfect moment of art direction — he actually matched the set, and when he and Blair have their sad moment in the garden, it was a symphony of greens and flower blossoms. A memorable moment where costumes and sets work seamlessly to create a visual atmosphere." During a New York Magazine interview, Eric Daman cites both outfits in his list of eleven favorite looks in the series.

== Cultural Allusions ==
- During Jeremiah Harris' public reading, he recites a passage from Bright Lights Big City.
- Blair compares a lifeguard to Kleenex tissue.
- Blair's favorite movies are Breakfast at Tiffany's, Roman Holiday and Funny Face, and she hates Charade.
- Blair mentions James giving her a Bulgari necklace.
- Blair reveals that she has traveled to France and gloomily thought about Chuck while celebrating Bastille Day.
- Chuck mentions going to Lily Pond, a Hamptons club.
- Jenny meets Tinsley Mortimer.
- Blair speculates that Serena has been watching The Closer while Serena replies eating at Della Femina.
- Gossip Girl describes The Hamptons as "Think Park Avenue but with tennis whites and Bain de Soleil."
- Dan is seen writing on Moleskine.
- Jenny describes the exclusivity of the White Party by mentioning how recording artist Jack Johnson was turned away from last year's party.

== Reception ==
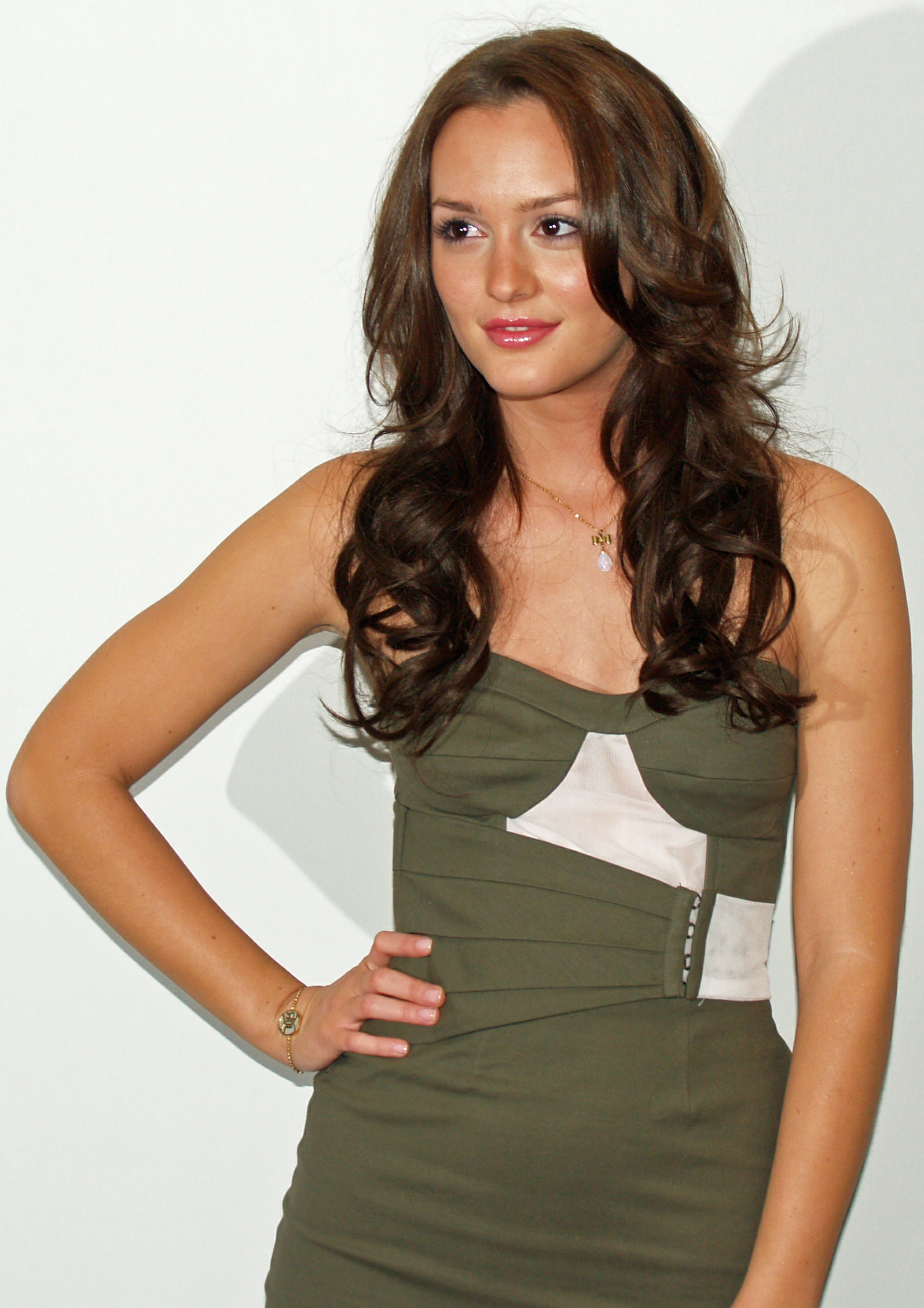
Leighton Meester (pictured) received critical acclaim for her performances in this episode

"Summer, Kind of Wonderful" was watched by 3.43 million of viewers and received positive reviews from critics.

Most of the critics had praised Leighton Meester, Ed Westwick and guest star Mädchen Amick for their performances. Kona Gallagher, from Television Blend, enjoyed the "new multidimensional Chuck", and considered the episode a "pretty strong premiere". Isabelle Carreau, from TV Squad, had praised Mädchen Amick's performance in the episode, saying she "was a good choice to play Catherine", and compared Chuck Bass with Christian Troy, a plastic surgeon portrayed by Julian McMahon in Nip/Tuck stating "he is a ladies' man who likes the idea of being with someone but can't commit". Jacob, from Television Without Pity, praised Nate's storyline and Mädchen Amick's performances in the episode. Michelle Graham of Film School Rejects praised the Nate's storyline, calling it a "blessing for him as his character has always been one of the least interesting". Graham was surprised with the transformation of Dan Humphrey and compared his character's dating habits with Chuck Bass, further adding that the change "is a nice way to flesh out an otherwise goody goody guy. Hopefully he won’t revert to [this] type with his reunion with Serena." Graham had high hopes for the premiere and considered the episode a "good start to the season, with plenty of threads to weave into a new storyline but sadly none of them are as scandalous as last year’s… Yet." On Jenny's character, Graham considered her storyline "predictable & dull, but there’s definitely something enjoyable in seeing her boss get dissed by a famous model." BuzzSugar commended how the storylines were "tidied up" so fast.

In contrast to positive criticism, Amber Charleville of Firefox News considered that "despite the fresh locale and the ever snappy voiceover of Gossip Girl", she found that "most of the characters were up to their same, stale tricks" but praised Blake Lively's performances, saying that she knows that Serena isn't perfect, "but she does try to be a good person". Further praise went to Leighton Meester and Ed Westwick's performances as Blair Waldorf and Chuck Bass had "handedly saved the episode from total ruination".
