= The Dark Night =

- Gossip Girl episode
- Chuck seduces Blair.
- Episode no.: Season 2 Episode 03
- Directed by: Janice Cooke
- Written by: John Stephens
- Production code: 203
- Original air date: September 15, 2008

Guest appearances
- Mädchen Amick as Duchess Catherine Beaton; Margaret Colin as Eleanor Waldorf; Patrick Heusinger as Lord Marcus Beaton; Michelle Hurd as Laurel; Purva Bedi as Clare; Alexandra Carl as Laurel's Assistant; Yin Chang as Nelly Yuki; Nicole Fiscella as Isabel Coates; Amanda Setton as Penelope Shafai

Episode chronology
← Previous "Never Been Marcused"	Next → "The Ex Files"
- Gossip Girl season 2

"The Dark Night" is the 21st episode of the CW television series, Gossip Girl. It was a bottle episode and the third episode of the show's second season. The episode was written by John Stephens and directed by Janice Cooke. It originally aired on Monday, September 15, 2008 on the CW. This episode is also the most watched episode of the series, with an average of 3.73 million of viewers.

== Plot ==
Blair wants to consummate her relationship with Marcus, but he would rather wait for a more special moment. Nate keeps postponing his dates with Vanessa, leaving her worried about the status of their relationship. Dan and Serena are ready to go public with their rekindled relationship despite not having fixed their issues. Blair has been devising a scheme against Vanessa and Nate for Catherine. Chuck has been suffering from erectile dysfunction due to his repressed feelings for Blair. Three preteen girls spot Dan and Serena and admonish them for getting back together. Vanessa and Nate are hanging out when Blair invites them to a party, but Nate can see through her uncharacteristic kindness. Jenny is fired from Eleanor Waldorf's company for criticizing her design. During Blair's party, Vanessa catches Nate with Catherine right before a city-wide blackout (that traps Serena and Dan in an elevator). Blair is determined to have sex with Marcus as soon as possible but Chuck thwarts her plans by pretending to be him in the dark. Serena and Dan agree to disagree and break up again. When the power comes back on Marcus catches them. Vanessa breaks up with Nate as she leaves, due to Catherine threatening to extort Nate's family. Eleanor rehires Jenny.

== Reception ==
"The Dark Night" was watched by 3.73 million viewers, and with the Live + 7 DVR Rating, it scored 4.16 million viewers, making this episode the highest of the series. The episode also hits series highs in women 18-34 (4.1) and adults 18-34 (2.8). It also ranked #1 in adults 18-34 for the night, beating shows like Two and a Half Men and The Big Bang Theory.

The episode received mixed reviews from critics though, critics praised Leighton Meester, Mädchen Amick, and Blake Lively's performances by saying that they got all the best lines of the episode. Isabelle Carreau, from TV Squad, compared Serena and Dan's relationship to Friends main couple Ross and Rachel by saying that "the couple has a bumpy road ahead". Although, she felt that the couples scenes "felt a little flat" for her taste, and that she had expected "something juicier than what we were offered". She defined the episode as "an enjoyable episode filled with twists and turns and loads of backstabbing" and also defended Vanessa by saying that she's starting to like of the character "because of the calmness and maturity she can show". Michelle Graham, from Film School Rejects, said "Catherine’s comments on her need for Nate and how Blair’s relationship with Lord Marcus might be missing one thing is an interesting parallel", and also said that even though "it was nice to see Vanessa again", "she did come off very whiny and a tad annoying". She also said that "Jenny’s sudden rise from intern to confidante of the designer felt incredibly contrived", and that the scene where Blair make-out with Chuck knowing that it's him, not Marcus, makes "no-sense". However, she defined the scene of the girls catching Serena and Dan up to the park as "excellent".

Buzz Sugar, from the BuzzSugar site, said that she cannot say anything too serious on the series and that she's "loving how ridiculous this season is". However, she enjoyed the scene of the little girls at the park and the bonding between Eleanor and Jenny. Kona Gallagher, from Television Blend, had said that she felt "silly" that Catherine was jealous of Nate and Vanessa's relationship, because in the end she's a married woman. She was confused and angry over the reason that lead to Serena and Dan's break-up by saying that it was such a "clichéd class war nonsense". She said that the episode overall had made "every relationship suddenly became completely contrived and laughable" and that pissed her off. Amber Charleville, from Firefox News, said that Dan's reason to break-up with Serena "sounds more like bitter jealousy than righteous indignation" than something else, and that the episode overall "ties up a lot of loose ends, but makes others fray unbecomingly".

Jennifer Armstrong, from Entertainment Weekly, ranked this episode at #7 as one of the best episodes of the year of 2008, as well as Brian Ford Sullivan, from The Futon Critic, who ranked this episode at #33 as one of the 50 best episodes of the year of 2008.

== Featured Music ==
- "Lights Out" by Santogold
- "Like Knives" by The Fashion
- "Closer" by Ne-Yo
- "I Can Feel A Hot One" by Manchester Orchestra
- "It's A Lot" by The 88
