= Never Been Marcused =

- Gossip Girl episode
- Chuck introduces Catherine to Blair.
- Episode no.: Season 2 Episode 2
- Directed by: Michael Fields
- Written by: Stephanie Savage
- Production code: 202
- Original air date: September 8, 2008

Guest appearances
- Mädchen Amick as Duchess Catherine Beaton; Francie Swift as Anne Archibald; Zuzanna Szadkowski as Dorota Kishlovsky; Patrick Heusinger as James Schuller / Lord Marcus Beaton

Episode chronology
← Previous "Summer, Kind of Wonderful"	Next → "The Dark Night"
- Gossip Girl season 2

"Never Been Marcused" is the 20th episode of the CW television series, Gossip Girl, as well as the second episode of the show's second season. The episode was written by executive producer and developer Stephanie Savage and directed by Michael Fields. It originally aired on Monday, September 8, 2008, on the CW. The episode received generally positive reviews from critics.

== Plot ==
Serena and Dan wake up on the beach after a night of passion but Serena feels they should discuss what went wrong with their relationship before getting back together. However, they end up sharing a bus back to Manhattan and, after a large amount of provocative behaviour, making out in the rest room.

Blair is throwing herself into a romance with Marcus on learning his true identity and tries to get his attention by organising a big, high class party at the Hudson with Dorota's help, asking Serena to invite Dan so he can talk football with Marcus. Marcus speaks with his stepmother, who turns out to be Catherine, Nate's older woman. Chuck, eager to drive a wedge between Blair and Marcus, befriends the lord and challenges him to a game of squash, where he learns Catherine always scares off Marcus' girlfriends.

Nate learns from his mother that the federal prosecutors are planning to seize their assets. He confides in Vanessa and is humiliated to learn Chuck has sold his club in order to give the money to Anne. Rufus returns from his tour and admits to Vanessa he is considering going on another one, but ultimately chooses to stay at home with Dan and Jenny.

Chuck takes Catherine to Blair's party, where Blair accidentally insults her before finding out who she is and Serena and Nate are shocked to realize their connection. Dan and Serena decide to give up on keeping apart and Nate sees them kiss and leave in an elevator. Nate tells Catherine about his family's money troubles. Blair walks in on them having sex in the library; Catherine tells Marcus that Blair has her approval and Blair makes it clear to Chuck that his plan failed. Nate cancels a meeting with Vanessa, unaware she was planning a romantic dinner, and Catherine gives him an envelope full of money before they drive off together.

== Reception ==
"Never been Marcused" was watched by 3.15 million of viewers.

The episode received generally positive reviews from critics, who felt that this episode was much better than the previous episode. Isabelle Carreau, from TV Squad, had praised Leighton Meester and Mädchen Amick's performances in the episode by saying that "both actresses delivered their bitchy lines perfectly" and that "they are believable as evil queens, each in their own way". Michelle Graham, from Film School Rejects, had said that even though the episode was "a little slow, a few interesting plot strands are beginning to emerge". Jennifer Sankowski, from TV Guide, had said that so much thing had happened in this episode that she had to "defer to Gossip Girl, who summarized things quite nicely". Amber Charleville, from Firefox News, also praised Leighton Meester's performances by saying that she had got all the best lines in the episode. She also defended the romance between Serena and Dan by saying that they got their old chemistry back.
