= The Ex Files =

- Gossip Girl episode
- Chuck tries to sabotage Blair and Serena's friendship.
- Episode no.: Season 2 Episode 04
- Directed by: Jim McKay
- Written by: Robby Hull
- Production code: 204
- Original air date: September 22, 2008

Guest appearances
- Mädchen Amick as Duchess Catherine Beaton; Connor Paolo as Eric van der Woodsen; Patrick Heusinger as Lord Marcus Beaton; Michelle Hurd as Laurel; Yin Chang as Nelly Yuki; Nicole Fiscella as Isabel Coates; Purva Bedi as Clare; Amanda Setton as Penelope Shafai; Laura-Leigh as Amanda Lasher

Episode chronology
← Previous "The Dark Night"	Next → "The Serena Also Rises"
- Gossip Girl season 2

"The Ex Files" is the 22nd episode of the CW television series, Gossip Girl. It was also the fourth episode of the show's second season. The episode was written by Robby Hull and directed by Jim McKay. It originally aired on Monday, September 22, 2008 on the CW.

== Plot ==
Dan meets a new girl named Amanda on the first day back to school. Blair and her clique look for new "projects" and "victims" and decide to go after the new girl whilst ignoring Jenny. Serena is upset that Dan has rebounded so quickly and Blair makes it worse by interfering. Dan asks Amanda on a date at Serena's favorite restaurant and she decides to tag along. Dan and Amanda bond over literature leaving Serena as a third wheel. Eventually, Serena and Dan decide it's better for them to just keep their distance. Blair's clique bullies Amanda by putting Nair in her hair and Dan blames Serena; she decides to start living up to her old reputation. Nate's mistress Catherine agreed to pay the Captain's restitution rather than blackmail him but Vanessa unwittingly thwarted Blair's plan. Chuck hired Amanda to pretend to like Dan in order to take down Blair as Queen B of Constance-Billard. Dan has become a social pariah because of how he treated "Queen" Serena.

== Reception ==
The episode received generally favorable reviews from critics. Most of the critics praised Blake Lively's performances in this episode. Isabelle Carreau, from TV Squad, continued to compare Serena and Dan's relationship to Rachel and Ross from Friends and also said that "Blake Lively delivered it with the right amount of attitude and bitchiness" in her final lines in the episode. Jennifer Sankowski, from TV Guide, had said that she was surprised to see that Amanda was working for Chuck all time long, and that the reason why she loves the show is because of the many twists between the episodes. Michelle Graham, from Film School Rejects, had said that "overall, this episode really kick started the season, with Chuck’s manipulations felt right the way through, but his hand mostly unseen until the end".

Nevertheless, Carlos Delgado of If Magazine gave the episode a negative rating of D+ and said that the show "is poised to take bad television to a whole new level".
