= The Goodbye Gossip Girl =

- Gossip Girl episode
- Promotional poster
- Episode no.: Season 2 Episode 25
- Directed by: Norman Buckley
- Written by: Joshua Safran
- Production code: 225
- Original air date: May 18, 2009

Guest appearances
- Margaret Colin as Eleanor Waldorf; James Naughton as William van der Bilt; Chris Riggi as Scott Rosson; Jan Maxwell as Headmistress Queller; Connor Paolo as Eric van der Woodsen; Wallace Shawn as Cyrus Rose; Yin Chang as Nelly Yuki; Nicole Fiscella as Isabel Coates; Amanda Setton as Penelope Shafai; Michelle Trachtenberg as Georgina Sparks; Dreama Walker as Hazel Williams; Sebastian Stan as Carter Baizen; Stella Maeve as Emma Boardman; Reed Birney as Mr. Prescott; Matt Doyle as Jonathan Whitney

Episode chronology
← Previous "Valley Girls"	Next → "Reversals of Fortune"
- Gossip Girl season 2

"The Goodbye Gossip Girl" is the 25th and final episode of the second season of the American teen drama television series Gossip Girl. The episode was written by Joshua Safran and directed by Norman Buckley. It originally aired on The CW in the United States on May 18, 2009.

"The Goodbye Gossip Girl" opens with graduation at Constance Billard and St. Jude's. Everything seems to be going smoothly until Gossip Girl sends a devastating e-mail blast that humiliates the majority of the senior class, prompting Serena van der Woodsen (Blake Lively) to seek out the identity of Gossip Girl. Unfortunately, Gossip Girl further wreaks havoc on the senior class during a party just when Blair Waldorf (Leighton Meester) and Chuck Bass (Ed Westwick) decide to confess their feelings for one another, interrupting them, causing previous issues to resurface between them. Dan Humphrey (Penn Badgley), Nate Archibald (Chace Crawford), and Vanessa Abrams (Jessica Szohr) are caught in the crossfire of Serena's war with Gossip girl and Jenny Humphrey (Taylor Momsen) faces the prospect of becoming Queen when Blair's minions rebel against her make a bidding war on who will be the next Queen Bee.

== Plot ==
Thinking that after graduation, Serena and her friends will be off the Gossip Girl's radar are in for a surprise, as Gossip Girl writes a scathe post calling everyone out on their dirty sins done in high school. Serena, Blair, Nate and Chuck decide to uncover the mysterious blogger. Chuck and Blair resolve to be vulnerable with each other after playing with each other's emotions for the past two years. Nate is contemplating a summer job in the Mayor's office as well as a summer backpacking in Europe with Vanessa.

Meanwhile for the underclassmen, Jenny is being tested by Blair and her minions as they try to find the new Queen Bee of the school as their time is coming to an end. Lily and Rufus take a significant step forward in their relationship, which will have long-term effects for both of their families.

In the midst of their graduation party, Gossip Girl posts another scandalous blog post, detailing all the wrongdoings they engaged in throughout their senior year and reminding the recent graduates that despite having graduated from high school, they will never be able to get rid of her no matter how hard they try. After putting up with the posts, Serena snaps and decides to arrange a meeting with Gossip Girl by herself, which ultimately does not take place because Gossip Girl was not willing to expose herself to the one girl who is the subject of the most discussion on her blog.

After learning she didn't meet with Gossip girl, her classmates are angry and are willing to hunt for Gossip girl, but Serena calms them down by saying in a few months they will be in college where they can all start anew and forget about Gossip girl. After saying that, Her classmates realize that this might be their last time together and decide to enjoy their last night together by renting out the whole bar they were in.

In the end of the episode, Blair and Chuck reconnect and decide to say "I Love You" and kiss at his new hotel "the Empire". It's also mentioned Serena will be attending Brown, and Blair, Dan, and Vanessa will be attending NYU and Nate will be attending Columbia. Jenny and Eric will continue attending Constance for their Junior year as Jenny is now the Queen Bee.

== Reception ==
"The Goodbye Gossip Girl" was watched by 2.23 million of viewers.

Michelle Graham of Film School Rejects praised the finale and reviewed the entirety of the second season. "“The West Wing” once called the swearing in of a certain Vice President “a triumph of the middling” and that’s definitely what this season has felt like." Graham commended the writer's usage of the characters searching for the identity of Gossip Girl, stating "The idea of discovering the identity of Gossip Girl was tantalizing, especially as it really does have to be someone featured on the show’s peripheries. Of course, we were never going to really find out who it was, as it’d spell the end of a lucrative series for The CW. However, the chase was fun and the consequences of going head to head with the big G were far reaching." Graham also commended the cliffhanger involving Rufus and Lily's lovechild.

Graham heavily praised the relationship between Chuck and Blair and hailed the well-received kiss between them, calling Chuck's declaration of love one of the high points for the season finale. "It did seem as though Gossip Girl had managed to finally destroy Blair and Chuck’s chances as her all-out assault hit them mid-seduction. The couple that had gone through hell over the last two seasons seemed about to be happy together, only to have past affairs used to ruin it. However, the writers realised that another trip around the block for Dan and Serena just yet would throw the fans into a revolutionary frenzy, and so rescued the damsel and her black knight." Graham opined on the direction of their relationship following Chuck's declaration. "How will Blair and Chuck fare with an honest to goodness grown-up relationship, now that the games are at an end and they have both declared their feelings?"

Graham welcomed Georgina's return following her previous arc that began during the episode, Southern Gentlemen Prefer Blondes. "Of course, to balance the cute we need something evil and no character manages that better than good old Georgina Sparks. Her mere moments in the episode rank as my other high point as not only do we discover that the Poppy Lifton issue has been resolved. (The only problem with this scene: HOW did she resolve the issue?) but also that she will be back!"With the return of Georgina in the finale, Graham expressed high hopes for her character for the next season, stating "Perhaps this will be the spark (no pun intended) required to shake Blair’s cobwebs off and get her back to her queen bee fighting weight."

Entertainment Weekly listed Chuck and Blair's final scene in their "25 Great 'I Love You's".
