= The Serena Also Rises =

- Gossip Girl episode
- Serena walks the runway of Eleanor's fashion show
- Episode no.: Season 2 Episode 5
- Directed by: Patrick Norris
- Written by: Jessica Queller
- Production code: 205
- Original air date: September 29, 2008

Guest appearances
- Robert John Burke as Bart Bass; Margaret Colin as Eleanor Waldorf; Tamara Feldman as Poppy Lifton; David Patrick Kelly as Noah Shapiro; Yin Chang as Nelly Yuki; Nicole Fiscella as Isabel Coates

Episode chronology
← Previous "The Ex Files"	Next → "New Haven Can Wait"
- Gossip Girl season 2

"The Serena Also Rises" is the fifth episode of the second season of the American teen drama television series Gossip Girl, which originally aired on The CW on September 29, 2008. The episode was written by Jessica Queller and directed by Patrick Norris.

In the midst of Fashion Week, a furious Blair Waldorf (Leighton Meester) plans on sabotaging Serena van der Woodsen (Blake Lively) after Serena claims her Queen Bee status and rejecting her for New York socialite Poppy Lifton (Tamara Feldman), during her mother's fashion show. Jenny Humphrey (Taylor Momsen) becomes a casualty of Blair's schemes as her father Rufus Humphrey (Matthew Settle) begins to see through her Jenny's lies. Meanwhile, Dan Humphrey (Penn Badgley) decides to hang out with Chuck Bass (Ed Westwick) to improve his writing, incidentally discovering a darker side to Chuck. Lily Bass (Kelly Rutherford) finds difficulty in her marriage with Bart Bass (Robert John Burke) when details behind her past are uncovered.

== Plot ==
Blair designs a seating plan for Eleanor's fashion show and attempts to get back in favor with the girls at school by presenting them with front row tickets. However, the girls' attention is soon drawn to the society pages, which detail Serena's new friendship with society girl Poppy Lifton. Jenny suggests to Eleanor that they improve the guest list by getting Serena to invite Poppy and her friends. When Blair finds the seating plan changed, she sees it as a personal insult from Jenny and Serena, who normally watches the show backstage with her. (In fact, Jenny did not know Blair did the plan and Lily accepted Eleanor's offer without telling Serena.) Blair realizes Jenny has been playing truant to work for Eleanor and tells Rufus, who drags Jenny home from the atelier. Poppy suggests Serena placate Blair by inviting her to an after party, but when Serena goes to see Blair they end up arguing and Serena decides to go to the fashion show anyway.

Dan meets his new mentor, Noah Shapiro, who is unimpressed that all his stories involve a sheltered boy from Brooklyn with girl troubles. Dan says that is all he knows so Shapiro tells him to get out of his comfort zone. Dan asks Chuck if he can spend an evening with him and Chuck is bored enough to agree. He feeds Dan pills and shots, takes him to a strip club and then leaves him by the side of the road with no shoes. Shapiro is not impressed with the resulting story but is intrigued by Dan's "Charlie Trout" character. He tells Dan to learn the secret that will humanise him.

Lily has hired an art dealer to redecorate the apartment and asks her to buy a nude photo that Mapplethorpe once did of her. The art dealer finds it has already been bought by Bart. She and Lily assume it is a present but when Bart returns home he reveals he only bought it so no-one could see it and use it against them. Lily is shocked he got a private investigator to do a file on her past and claims she has nothing she wants to hide from her children...until Bart shows her one of the things he dug up.

Jenny goes to the fashion show after a meeting with Principal Queller. Blair tries to move Serena onto the back room but is stopped by Jenny and Eleanor. Jenny gives an assistant the dress she made to wear at the after party. On learning Jenny is in charge of models, Blair sends them home but Jenny ropes in Serena, Poppy and their friends as replacements. Serena is worried how Blair will feel, but Poppy tells her she spent years hiding her light because of her best friend's insecurities and a true friend will support her. Blair gives Serena Jenny's dress to wear for the finale. Eleanor is furious and blames Jenny. Jenny tells Blair that she wanted to be her friend because they both work hard for things, rather than gliding through life like Serena. The news comes through that everyone loves the dress; Blair and Jenny convince Eleanor to take the credit for it, since Jenny used her materials and designs. Jenny hears Rufus is outside but tells the assistant her dad is out of town.

Dan overhears Chuck trying to phone an uninterested Bart. Chuck mistakes a girl at the bar for a hooker and tries to hire her. Her boyfriend squares up to Chuck and Dan punches him, getting them both arrested. In the lock-up, Chuck thanks Dan and says Bart always hated him because his mother died in child birth. Chuck's lawyer gets him released; Chuck offers to do the same for Dan until he is accidentally handed Dan's belongings, including the story. He tells Dan he lied and his mother died in a plane crash when he was six. Dan calls Shapiro who tells him the guy he punched has dropped the charges. Dan tells him "Charlie"'s secret but is not sure about using it, since he is not sure about exploiting people. Shapiro walks away from him.

Rufus arrives at the after-party as Eleanor and Blair are leading a toast to Jenny. Jenny tells him that she told Queller she is not going back to school. Blair tries to apologise to Serena but Serena tells her she is not going to hold herself back so as not to outshine Blair anymore, and it is up to Blair if she supports that. Serena leaves with Poppy.

== Reception ==
"The Serena Also Rises" was watched by 3.39 million of viewers, making of this episode the 3rd most watched episode of the series.

The episode received generally favorable reviews from critics. Most critics praised the fashion theme and the scenes involving Chuck and Dan. Isabelle Carreau, from TV Squad reviewed the episode based on fan perspective, stating that the episode was "a little bit awkward but satisfying at the same time". Carreau enjoyed Serena finally embraced one side of herself, but was disappointed with Jenny's choices throughout the episode. Film School Rejects praised the episode with Michelle Graham stating "Fashion week is hellish, rivalries are at their peak and this episode showcases that to perfection". Jacob from Television Without Pity, gave the episode an A+, citing positive reviews on Chuck and Blair's performances. Overthinking It noted the show's creative streak, stating "The last episode of Gossip Girl continued the show's return to form, and thankfully contained various acts of wanton cruelty."

Critical reaction towards Ed Westwick's performance was mixed. Carlos Delgado, from If Magazine, praised Chuck's story line, stating that "the real magic happens" when Chuck opens his heart to Dan. He would later call the show "a mindless unrealistic teen drama". Overthinking It praised Chuck's development, calling his motivations "inscrutable" further asserting that it was his inscrutability that "added to his allure, because it made him impossible to judge, at least on any terms he's willing to grant us — as opposed to say, morally, by which standard he's a jerk. There was a constant deferral of judgment, a missing piece of information that was necessary to forming a complete picture of him. This kept us involved with the character and, they should hope, kept us watching."
