= Gossip Girl season 2 =

Gossip Girl
- Season 2
- DVD cover art
- Showrunners: Josh Schwartz; Stephanie Savage
- Starring: Blake Lively; Leighton Meester; Penn Badgley; Chace Crawford; Taylor Momsen; Ed Westwick; Jessica Szohr; Kelly Rutherford; Matthew Settle
- No. of episodes: 25

Release
- Original network: The CW
- Original release: September 1, 2008 – May 18, 2009

Season chronology
- ← Previous; Season 1 Next → Season 3

The second season of the American teen drama television series Gossip Girl premiered on The CW on September 1, 2008, and concluded on May 18, 2009, consisting of 25 episodes. Based on the novel series of the same name by Cecily von Ziegesar, the series was developed for television by Josh Schwartz and Stephanie Savage. Every episode title this season was a reference to a film from the 20th century.

There was also a spin off pilot, focusing on Lily van der Woodsen (Kelly Rutherford/Brittany Snow) and her family in California.

== Synopsis ==
The newly formed Bass-Van der Woodsen family is now regarded as the richest in New York's Upper East Side. Eleanor Waldorf remarries, causing Blair to struggle with her new blended family. Jenny's rebellion from "Little J" and attempting to start her own clothing line. Dan is accepted to Yale, but has to refuse due to financial stress and ends up at NYU along with Vanessa. Serena is also accepted, but denies to attend Brown University. Blair is rejected by Yale, but is able to get into NYU with Cyrus' help. Nate plans to attend Columbia University. As Nate's family issues intensify, he takes extreme measures that ultimately hurt him and his chances with Vanessa Abrams. Nate accepts money from a married Duchess, Catherine Beaton, to save his family from debt. Lily van der Woodsen grows closer with Rufus Humphrey, even after her new marriage with Bart Bass. Chuck is confronted with an unimaginable tragedy. Bart Bass tragically dies in a car accident. Rufus and Lily rekindle their relationship after his death. Lily adopts Chuck, becoming his legal guardian, so that she could be named head of Bass Industries and give it to Chuck when he is of age. Blair and Chuck struggle with admitting their feelings for one another. Serena, Eric, Dan and Jenny learn a long-buried secret from Lily and Rufus' past that has come to light.

== Cast and characters ==
=== Main ===
- Blake Lively as Serena van der Woodsen
- Leighton Meester as Blair Waldorf
- Penn Badgley as Dan Humphrey
- Chace Crawford as Nate Archibald
- Taylor Momsen as Jenny Humphrey
- Ed Westwick as Chuck Bass
- Jessica Szohr as Vanessa Abrams
- Kelly Rutherford as Lily van der Woodsen
- Matthew Settle as Rufus Humphrey
- Kristen Bell as the voice of Gossip Girl (uncredited)

=== Valley Girls ===
- Brittany Snow as Lily Rhodes
- Krysten Ritter as Carol Rhodes
- Andrew McCarthy as Rick Rhodes
- Matt Barr as Keith van der Woodsen
- Shiloh Fernandez as Owen Campos
- Ryan Hansen as Shep
- Cynthia Watros as CeCe Rhodes

=== Recurring ===
- Mädchen Amick as Catherine Beaton
- Connor Paolo as Eric van der Woodsen
- Patrick Heusinger as Marcus Beaton
- Michelle Hurd as Laurel
- Zuzanna Szadkowski as Dorota Kishlovsky
- Francie Swift as Anne Archibald
- Margaret Colin as Eleanor Waldorf
- Yin Chang as Nelly Yuki
- Amanda Setton as Penelope Shafai
- Nicole Fiscella as Isabel Coates
- Robert John Burke as Bart Bass
- Tamara Feldman as Poppy Lifton
- Dreama Walker as Hazel Williams
- Matt Doyle as Jonathan Whitney
- John Patrick Amedori as Aaron Rose
- Willa Holland as Agnes Andrews
- Wallace Shawn as Cyrus Rose
- Desmond Harrington as Jack Bass
- Michelle Trachtenberg as Georgina Sparks

=== Guest ===
- Caroline Lagerfelt as CeCe Rhodes
- Laura-Leigh as Amanda Lasher
- David Patrick Kelly as Noah Shapiro
- Jill Flint as Bex Simon
- Stella Maeve as Emma Boardman
- Cyndi Lauper as herself
- Sam Robards as Howard Archibald
- John Shea as Harold Waldorf
- Linda Emond and Jan Maxwell as Headmistress Queller
- William Abadie as Roman
- Laura Breckenridge as Rachel Carr
- Sebastian Stan as Carter Baizen
- James Naughton as William van der Bilt
- Aaron Tveit as Tripp van der Bilt III
- Armie Hammer as Gabriel Edwards
- Aaron Schwartz as Vanya
- No Doubt as Snowed Out

== Episodes ==
No. overall	No. in season	Title	Directed by	Written by	Original release date	U.S. viewers (millions)
19	1	"Summer, Kind of Wonderful"	J. Miller Tobin	Joshua Safran	September 1, 2008	3.43
As the summer draws to a close in the Hamptons, Serena and Nate have everyone fooled into thinking they are a couple to cover up the fact that Nate has been hooking up with an older woman. Blair returns from abroad with an attractive man on her arm, Marcus, making a very jealous Chuck question his decision to leave Blair stranded at the heliport. Dan has spent the summer assisting a famous author, and clearly still has a certain girl on his mind, which results in him going after her. While interning for Eleanor Waldorf's company, Jenny sneaks a coveted invite to the Hamptons' White Party and meets socialite Tinsley Mortimer. Title reference: The 1987 film Some Kind of Wonderful.
20	2	"Never Been Marcused"	Michael Fields	Stephanie Savage	September 8, 2008	3.25
Blair is delighted that she is dating royalty and falls in love with idea of being a royal, while scheming against both Chuck and Marcus. Serena and Dan agree to keep their recent hook-ups a secret from their friends and family until they figure out what all this means for their relationship. Meanwhile, Nate learns the downside to having an affair with a hot older woman, Catherine, who also happens to be married. Title reference: The 1999 film Never Been Kissed.
21	3	"The Dark Night"	Janice Cooke	John Stephens	September 15, 2008	3.73
Stuck in a citywide blackout, the teens are forced to confront their problems in time for the start of the new school year. Blair and Chuck are concerned about the lack of passion in their new relationships. Being trapped in an elevator forces Serena and Dan to bring up the issues they faced in junior year. Nate is torn between his affections for Vanessa and his increasingly complicated relationship with Catherine. Meanwhile, Jenny faces losing her internship when Eleanor catches Jenny criticizing one of her designs. Title reference: The 2008 film The Dark Knight.
22	4	"The Ex Files"	Jim McKay	Robert Hull	September 22, 2008	3.33
The school year has started for the students of Constance Billard and St. Jude. Blair and her minions decide to befriend the new girl Amanda in order to sabotage her for coming in between Serena and Dan. Vanessa discovers a scandalous secret about Catherine and enlists Blair's scheming expertise to use the information to help Nate. Meanwhile, Lily finds herself drawn back to her ex, Rufus, once again. Title reference: The TV series The X-Files.
23	5	"The Serena Also Rises"	Patrick Norris	Jessica Queller	September 29, 2008	3.40
In the midst of Fashion Week, Blair is outraged when she discovers that Eleanor has given Serena and her new socialite friend, Poppy Lifton, front-row seats to the Eleanor Waldorf show at the advice of her protégée Jenny. Blair decides to ruin the event after being hurt by Serena's popularity and her mother's betrayal. Meanwhile, Dan begins hanging out with Chuck, but a walk down the dark side always comes with costs, as Dan discovers the hard way. Lily discovers a secret her new husband, Bart, has been hidden from her. Title reference: The 1926 novel The Sun Also Rises.
24	6	"New Haven Can Wait"	Norman Buckley	Alexandra McNally & Joshua Safran	October 13, 2008	3.31
Following the fight after the fashion show with Blair, Serena decides to get revenge by canceling her intentions to visit Brown and accepting a personal invitation to visit Yale from the Dean. Dan resorts to desperate ways to get into Yale after realizing that his reference letters were never sent. Chuck is kidnapped by Skull and Bones members while visiting Yale, and Nate meets a student who may hold the key to Dan's acceptance. Title reference: The 1978 film Heaven Can Wait.
25	7	"Chuck in Real Life"	Tony Wharmby	Lenn K. Rosenfeld	October 20, 2008	3.03
Vanessa continues to use the photograph of Catherine and Marcus to blackmail Blair, which prompts Blair to retaliate. Lily and Bart organize a lavish housewarming celebration and expect their children to make them proud in front of the assembled press, but a rebellious Serena refuses to play by their rules. Meanwhile, Dan and Jenny uncover a major truth that Nate has been keeping hidden from his friends. Title reference: The 2007 film Dan in Real Life.
26	8	"Pret-a-Poor-J"	Vondie Curtis-Hall	Amanda Lasher	October 27, 2008	3.05
Jenny befriends a young model, Agnes, who encourages Jenny to not only explore her wild side, but also to confront her fears no matter who gets hurt. Serena meets an artist, Aaron Rose, and realizes they have instant chemistry. Blair enlists the avice of Dan to help her seduce Chuck, but it proves tougher than she ever imagined. Title reference: The 1994 film Prêt-à-Porter.
27	9	"There Might Be Blood"	Michael Fields	Etan Frankel & John Stephens	November 3, 2008	3.16
Serena realizes Aaron has been keeping a secret from her. Blair babysits the 15-year-old daughter of a Yale donor who has bit of a wild side. Meanwhile, Jenny and Agnes plan a guerrilla fashion show that will either launch Jenny's fame or ruin her chances of ever being accepted by the industry. Dan and Vanessa learn the secret between Jenny and Nate. Title reference: The 2007 film There Will Be Blood.
28	10	"Bonfire of the Vanity"	David Von Ancken	Jessica Queller	November 10, 2008	2.88
Not approving of the new man in her mother's life, Cyrus Rose, Blair makes it her mission to split up the two lovebirds. After running away from home, Jenny moves in with Agnes as the friends move forward with their plans for a fashion line. Serena continues to fall for the new guy in her life, Aaron, but she learns something about him that threatens to end things just as they are getting good. Dan decides to win the trust of Bart Bass in order to learn more about the man and possibly write an exposé on him for Vanity Fair, but things get heated after Chuck finds out the real reason Dan is spending so much time around his family. Singer Cyndi Lauper makes a cameo at Blair's 18th birthday party celebration. Title reference: The 1987 novel The Bonfire of the Vanities.
29	11	"The Magnificent Archibalds"	Jean de Segonzac	Joshua Safran	November 17, 2008	2.89
Thanksgiving in the Waldorf household finds Blair upset that her mom's new boyfriend, Cyrus, has decided to ruin all her favorite traditions, but that is nothing compared to what is coming next. Lily finds herself trying to broker a peace between Rufus and Jenny as their relationship is given an ultimatum. As Serena tries to keep her past a secret from her new man, Aaron becomes curious and seeks help from Dan. Vanessa and Chuck come to their friend's aid when Nate is once again forced to confront his father's abandonment. Finally, Eric discovers a secret that Bart has been keeping from Lily. Title reference: The 1918 novel The Magnificent Ambersons.
30	12	"It's a Wonderful Lie"	Patrick Norris	Robert Hull	December 1, 2008	3.11
The annual Snowflake Ball has arrived for the students of St. Jude and Constance Billard. Blair and Chuck decide to test how well they know each other, which ends with them finding doppelgängers of themselves. Aaron's ex-girlfriend, Lexi, expresses an interest in Dan. There is drama between Serena and Dan about their sex lives. Nate, Jenny and Vanessa get into a tangled situation that puts their friendships and hearts on the line, as Vanessa steals a love letter Nate had written to Jenny and continues her relationship with Nate. Jenny retaliates by sending an unsuspecting Vanessa to the ball in a see-through dress. After the ball, Nate ends things with Jenny and goes after Vanessa. As Bart Bass is trying to return to the Snowflake Ball, he suffers a car accident. Title reference: The 1946 film It's a Wonderful Life.
31	13	"O Brother, Where Bart Thou?"	Joe Lazarov	Stephanie Savage	December 8, 2008	2.99
A sudden and tragic event hits the Bass family with the passing of Bart Bass. The whole city is shocked, including Lily. Chuck does not react very well to the passing of his father. Blair has something important to say to Chuck, but it is said at a bad time. Right before Serena travels to Argentina with Aaron, Dan decides to express his feelings for her. Meanwhile, Cyrus and Eleanor get married, and Rufus discovers something that Lily has been keeping from everybody for a long time. Title reference: The 2000 film O Brother, Where Art Thou?
32	14	"In the Realm of the Basses"	Tony Wharmby	John Stephens	January 5, 2009	2.96
With Chuck missing since after his father's funeral, Jack arrives on the Upper East Side to help Chuck pick up the messy pieces, but first he has to find him. Trying her best to forget her last painful exchange with Chuck, Blair focuses her attention on being accepted into the most prestigious ladies' club in the city, the Colony Club. Jenny returns to Constance Billard and immediately takes on Penelope and her posse of mean girls, but no one is going down without a valiant Gossip Girl-worthy fight. Meanwhile, after Serena tells Dan about her recent break-up, they decide to get back together. Title reference: The 1976 film In the Realm of the Senses.
33	15	"Gone with the Will"	Tricia Brock	Amanda Lasher	January 12, 2009	2.85
With the reading of Bart Bass' will, Chuck, Bart's brother Jack, and Blair learn the fate of the Bass empire. Rufus and Lily's relationship is strained as Rufus seeks details about the child he never knew he had. Noticing that his father has been acting strangely as of late, Dan does some investigating and uncovers Rufus and Lily's secret, putting him in the awkward situation of deciding what to do with this shocking revelation and whom to share it with. Title reference: The 1936 novel Gone with the Wind.
34	16	"You've Got Yale!"	Janice Cooke	Joshua Safran	January 19, 2009	2.22
It is that stressful time of year when Constance Billard and St. Jude's students find out who is and is not worthy of early admission to Yale University. Serena bonds with her new Shakespeare teacher, Rachel, who has no clue the wrath she is about to suffer after giving Blair the first B of her prep school career. Chuck pairs up with an unlikely ally in his war against Jack over Bass Industries. Meanwhile, Nate and Vanessa have a romantic night at the opera. Title reference: The 1998 film You've Got Mail.
35	17	"Carrnal Knowledge"	Elizabeth Allen	Alexandra McNally & Lenn K. Rosenfeld	February 2, 2009	2.31
In retaliation for not playing by the unspoken rules of Constance Billard, Blair hatches a plan to bring down her teacher, Rachel. After Chuck wakes up in a hotel and only has a minor recollection of what happened the previous evening, Nate and Vanessa try to help him fill in the missing pieces. Blair starts a rumor about Dan and Rachel, which gets Rachel fired. Dan and Serena decide to break up and Dan has sex with Rachel, as she is no longer a teacher. Unaware of this, the school reinstates Rachel. Title reference: The 1971 film Carnal Knowledge.
36	18	"The Age of Dissonance"	Norman Buckley	Jessica Queller	March 16, 2009	2.33
The seniors put on a production of The Age of Innocence and find their personal lives mirroring the play. Serena develops a crush on the play's director, Julian, and enlists Vanessa's knowledge of theater to help her get his attention. Nate has difficulties with the play and his relationship with Vanessa. Blair receives devastating news about her future that leads her on a witch-hunt for the person responsible. Blair thinks it is Dan, but it turns out to be Rachel. Dan and Rachel agree to stay away from each other in the aftermath of being discovered as more than teacher and student, but find it impossible to keep that promise, and end up having sex before the show. Chuck stumbles upon a secret society and is put into a dangerous situation to try and protect his new love interest. Chuck enlists help from an unlikely source, his nemesis Carter Baizen. Title reference: The 1920 novel The Age of Innocence.
37	19	"The Grandfather"	J. Miller Tobin	Robert Hull & Etan Frankel	March 23, 2009	2.25
Devastated by the recent plot twist in her life, Blair turns her back on her predictable Waldorf existence in favor of a more wild lifestyle, causing Serena and Chuck to have serious concerns about her new lover, Carter Baizen. Vanessa convinces Nate that it may be time to forgive and forget when it comes to his mother's Kennedy-esque family, the Van der Bilts, who abandoned Nate and his mother when they needed them the most. In a misguided effort to be completely honest with each other, Lily and Rufus agree to share lists of their past lovers. Title reference: The 1972 film The Godfather.
38	20	"Remains of the J"	Allison Liddi-Brown	Sarah Frank-Meltzer	March 30, 2009	2.45
Serena decides to throw Jenny an intimate party for her 16th birthday, but things get out of control when Serena turns the small gathering into a party. An angry Jenny writes a post to Gossip Girl, turning the party into a huge social event. In a moment of weakness, Vanessa agrees to help Chuck with a scheme having to do with Blair and Nate. Rufus learns that Dan will not receive financial aid at Yale and tries to figure out another way to cover the cost of his education. The episode ends with Chuck and Vanessa starting a friends with benefits, and Nate and Blair starting a relationship. Title reference: The 1989 novel The Remains of the Day.
39	21	"Seder Anything"	John Stephens	Amanda Lasher	April 20, 2009	2.37
Serena returns from her trip to Spain with Poppy and Gabriel. Blair makes a secret deal with Nate's grandfather, William van der Bilt, and Nate learns some disturbing information about his father's arrest. Dan takes a job as a cater-waiter to earn money for college, but is distressed when he discovers the gig is a Passover Seder at the Waldorf penthouse and several of his friends and family are guests. Title reference: The 1989 film Say Anything...
40	22	"Southern Gentlemen Prefer Blondes"	Patrick Norris	Leila Gerstein	April 27, 2009	1.97
Georgina Sparks returns to the Upper East Side after undergoing a major transformation. Chuck and Nate find themselves at a major crossroads in their relationship as it pertains to their mutual interest in Blair. Serena finds her relationship with Gabriel growing more and more complicated. Title reference: The 1949 musical Gentlemen Prefer Blondes.
41	23	"The Wrath of Con"	Janice Cooke	Sara Goodman	May 4, 2009	2.22
Blair pressures Georgina into making amends for her past bad behavior by helping her with a scheme. The rivalry between Nate and Chuck over Blair comes to a head. Lily hatches a secret plan to help Rufus with Dan's college tuition. Title reference: The 1982 film Star Trek II: The Wrath of Khan.
42	24	"Valley Girls"	Mark Piznarski	Josh Schwartz & Stephanie Savage	May 11, 2009	2.30
In a flashback to the 1980s, 17-year-old Lily Rhodes gets kicked out of boarding school and runs away to Los Angeles, reconnecting with her estranged older sister, Carol. Back in the present day, Blair and Nate attend their senior prom together, but the evening does not turn out exactly as planned due to Chuck's tricks. Serena and Lily do not see eye-to-eye over Serena's recent run-in with the law. Title reference: The 1983 film Valley Girl. Special guest star No Doubt performs in the flashbacks as a 1980s band called Snowed Out.
43	25	"The Goodbye Gossip Girl"	Norman Buckley	Joshua Safran	May 18, 2009	2.23
Gossip Girl plans to spice things up during the graduating class' final days of high school by spreading a tidal wave of juicy secrets. Meanwhile, Lily and Rufus decide to take a significant step. With the seniors leaving, Jenny's reputation is up in the air as Blair and her minions decide to choose one incoming Juniors to fill the Queen Bee position. Chuck makes a shocking revelation to Blair, and Nate wants to spend the summer rebelling against his family. Title reference: The 1977 film The Goodbye Girl.

== DVD release ==
Season two was released by Warner Home Video in the United States on August 18, 2009, it included all 25 episodes from the season, plus over 4 hours of bonus features including a downloadable audiobook, deleted scenes, behind-the-scenes featurettes and the exclusive pre-publication book excerpt from "Gossip Girl, I Will Always Love You". In the United States, some sets from the season were packaged with a free pair of jeweled earbuds.

Gossip Girl: The Complete Second Season
Set Details		Special Features	
25 episodes; 7-disc set; 1.78:1 aspect ratio; English (Dolby Digital 5.1 Surround); Subtitles: English SDH, Spanish, French, Portuguese, Chinese; Runtime: 1063 minutes		Unaired Scenes; Gag Reel; 'Chasing Dorotha' Webisodes; 2 Featurettes: 5th Ave. Meets Gossip Girl: Tour the Gossip Girl Crowd's Favorite Haunts; Faces Behind the Design: Creative Forces Behind the Show's Art and Fashion; Downloadable Audiobook of the Best-selling Novel Gossip Girl, You Know You Love Me by Cecily von Ziegesar, read by Christina Ricci	
Release Dates
Region 1	Region 2	Region 3	Region 4
August 18, 2009	September 28, 2009	October 2, 2009	September 24, 2009 (Brazil); October 28, 2009 (Australia)
