= Reversals of Fortune =

- Gossip Girl episode
- Promotional poster
- Episode no.: Season 3 Episode 1
- Directed by: J. Miller Tobin
- Written by: Joshua Safran
- Original air date: September 14, 2009

Guest appearances
- Connor Paolo as Eric van der Woodsen; Sebastian Stan as Carter Baizen; James Naughton as William Vanderbilt; Joanna Garcia as Bree Buckley; Aaron Schwartz as Vanya; Chris Riggi as Scott Rosson; Ashley Hinshaw as herself

Episode chronology
← Previous "The Goodbye Gossip Girl"	Next → "The Freshman"
- Gossip Girl season 3

"Reversals of Fortune" is the 44th episode of the CW television series, Gossip Girl and the third season premiere. The episode was written by Joshua Safran and directed by J. Miller Tobin. It originally aired on Monday, September 14, 2009, on the CW.

"Reversals of Fortune" shows Blair Waldorf (Leighton Meester) and Chuck Bass (Ed Westwick) exercise their relationship through unconventional means. Serena van der Woodsen (Blake Lively) returns from her European vacation a celebrity but finds herself facing other troubles when Carter Baizen (Sebastian Stan) follows her. Nate Archibald (Chace Crawford) decides to sever ties with his family returns from his travels with Bree Buckley (Joanna Garcia), a member of his family's political rival. Dan Humphrey (Penn Badgley) finds himself overwhelmed by the sudden change in his lifestyle while Vanessa Abrams (Jessica Szohr) assumes the worst of Dan and brings a long her new friend, Scott Rosson (Chris Riggi) to meet him and Rufus Humphrey (Matthew Settle).

== Plot ==
The third season premiere begins with summer drawing to an end. Blair Waldorf (Leighton Meester) and Chuck Bass (Ed Westwick) are madly in love, breaking all the traditional rules of dating as would be expected. Rufus Humphrey (Matthew Settle), Dan Humphrey (Penn Badgley), Jenny Humphrey (Taylor Momsen), and Eric van der Woodsen (Connor Paolo) spend the summer at the van der Woodsen house in the Hamptons, where they adapt to the upper society lifestyle faster than expected. Lily van der Woodsen (Kelly Rutherford) is out of town looking after her ailing mother.

Vanessa Abrams (Jessica Szohr) begins a relationship with Scott Rosson (Chris Riggi), not knowing that he is the illegitimate son of Rufus and Lily. Meanwhile, Scott uses Vanessa in order to get close to meet Rufus, his father. Nate Archibald (Chace Crawford) returns home from vacationing with a mysterious girl, Bree Buckley (Joanna Garcia), whom he soon discovers to be from a rival family. Nate rebels against his family, and plans to get back at his grandfather by bringing Bree to the big Vanderbilt charity polo match. As Nate and Bree are leaving the event, Nate's grandfather, William van der Bilt (James Naughton), stops them, telling Nate that he is a part of the family, no matter what. However, once they are out of earshot, Nate's grandfather makes a phone call telling someone he has figured out how to "do something about the Buckleys."

Serena van der Woodsen (Blake Lively) returns from her wild European adventure, swarmed with paparazzi. She is also unwillingly followed by Carter Baizen (Sebastian Stan). It is revealed at the end that Carter has been helping Serena search for her father. In a closing scene, Serena is seen on the phone, leaving a message for her father, we can only assume. She tells him that she is "going to do whatever it takes, for however long" to get his attention, implying that that is what was behind her antics over the summer.

== Production ==
Abercrombie and Fitch model, Ashley Hinshaw reportedly earned a role for the third-season premiere, portraying herself. "I kind of came in between Ed Westwick and Leighton Meester's character. I kind of was the wrench that Chuck and Blair threw in their relationship. I gave Chuck somebody to think about but in the end, the joke was on me and the game they were playing. That was something they enjoy doing, so it was kind of funny." DJ Alexandra Richards, daughter of musician Keith Richards, makes a cameo appearance in a role that would also catch the eye of Chuck Bass. Richards also filmed her scenes at the Greenwich Polo Club separately from polo player, Nacho Figueras. When approached for the role, Figueras accepted the offer. "Amazing, that's great. But I will only do it if I'm Nacho the polo player and I can wear my Black Watch shirt." And they agreed to let me do that."

== Reception ==
"Reversals of Fortune" was watched by 2.55 million viewers and received mixed reviews.

New York Magazine hailed the return of the third season and praised the premiere's theme of change as "Last night's episode was all about new beginnings. About taking on new roles — or shaking off old ones." and "a fresh start, a chance to do something, to be something different." Michelle Graham from Film School Rejects reviewed the episode unfavorably, noting a lack of interesting storylines. "For a season premiere, this episode lacked a lot of the punch designed to motivate viewers to stick with the show." but judged the premiere as a "calm before the storm lull" further stating that "Of course, with college just around the corner, things are soon going to change for everyone, so perhaps more of the fire will return to GG then." Enid Portugez of The Los Angeles Times had mixed thoughts on the episode. "Overall, my mind wasn't blown by the premiere, but the season's only just begun. Bring on the drama!"

With the Humphrey clan moving into the world of the Upper East Side, New York Magazine examined the altercation that occurred between Dan and Vanessa. "When Vanessa confronts Dan at the polo match, he presents a list of totally valid and sympathetic reasons he's not the same old Dan, which includes an illness in the family and major life changes, and brings up the very valid and obvious point that Vanessa is a shrew with class issues." The Los Angeles Times' however, was unsupportive of their move, stating "Their arty loft and bohemian existence was part of their charm," and sympathized with Vanessa's perception of their move, "I still felt just as Vanessa had when she saw Dan climbing into that limo—bittersweet and somewhat betrayed." Film School Rejects considered Dan’s speech to Vanessa as the high point of the episode.

"It's so ludicrous it's actually realistic, in the way that teenagers love to conceive of elaborate revenge fantasies that don't actually have any hope of working in the way that they imagine they will."

— New York Magazine on Serena's issues with her father.

Film School Rejects called Blair and Chuck’s game "predictable, with the whole set up screaming, well, set up." The Los Angeles Times compared it to Samantha and Smith's courtship in Sex and the City and looked forward to the progression of their relationship.

Serena's storyline was heavily panned with Graham calling it a "side plot" but found Serena fleeing from Carter interesting. "Serena’s wild child summer didn’t have the meat to hold up the bulk of the episode, which the writers attempted to have it do." In contrast, Jacob from Television Without Pity praised Serena for using Gossip Girl's blog for her personal ends and her motive for using it. "She's used GG and the tabs against Bart, she's used it against Rufus and Lily, she's even used it against Blair; she's been victimized by it more than any of them [...] And then Graduation, when she called GG's bluff sixteen times in an episode, bringing the world crashing down around her. So maybe it's just the wording, coincidentally: Maybe this is the strongest, smartest choice Serena could have made, and the lies are just about protecting Dan and Lily from how far she's willing to go."
