= Desperately Seeking Serena =

- Gossip Girl episode
- Episode no.: Season 1 Episode 15
- Directed by: Michael Fields
- Written by: Felicia D. Henderson
- Production code: 3T6764
- Original air date: April 28, 2008

Guest appearances
- Michelle Trachtenberg as Georgina Sparks; Nicole Fiscella as Isabel Coates; Yin Chang as Nelly Yuki; Amanda Setton as Penelope Shafai; Dreama Walker as Hazel Williams; Jesse Swenson as Asher Hornsby; Zuzanna Szadkowski as Dorota Kishlovsky

Episode chronology
← Previous "The Blair Bitch Project"	Next → "All About My Brother"

"Desperately Seeking Serena" is the 15th episode of the CW television series, Gossip Girl. The episode was written by Felicia D. Henderson and directed by Michael Fields. It originally aired on Monday, April 28, 2008 on the CW. It is the first episode to feature the recurring character of Georgina Sparks.

== Plot ==
Gossip Girl narrates that the SAT brings out the worst in everyone. Dan, Blair, and Serena are studying extremely hard. Chuck hires someone to take them for him and even gives him a fake ID. Rufus wants to walk Jenny to school, but Jenny is horrified by the idea so she leaves abruptly. Blair is threatened by Nelly Yuki because she has her sights on Yale, which means that Blair might not have a chance if she gets in. Chuck talks to Serena about Georgina. He tells her that she is in Switzerland and dating the prince. Jenny is hanging out with her friends and planning a study group session. Blair interrupts and offers them massages and spa treatment at her penthouse. Hazel, Penelope and Isabel go with Blair leaving Jenny alone. Dan sees Nate and they talk for a while. Serena comes up and kisses Dan. She apologizes for being off the radar. After Dan leaves, Georgina comes up to Serena.

Serena is surprised to see her. Georgina wants to hang out. Serena is reluctant to go with Georgina. Jenny and Elise meet up. Jenny wants to get a boyfriend to be separate from Blair and her crowd. They meet some boys who don't meet criteria. Jenny runs into a cute guy walking dogs. He writes his number on a piece of paper and gives it to Jenny. She throws it away because he's a dog-walker. She wants a king, not a jester. Nate goes into the coffee shop where Vanessa works. He gives Dan some SAT study books. Dan accepts them, even though Vanessa doesn't want them. Nate leaves, but he gives the books to Dan. Vanessa sees a piece of paper and starts reading with interest. Serena and Georgina meet at a bar and they get drinks. Serena doesn't want to drink, but Georgina convinces her to have one drink. Penelope, Hazel and Isabel arrive at Blair's. She says that before they get their spa treatment, they have to help her with something first. She shows them information on Nelly Yuki. Blair shows Nelly's academic and extracurricular activities. They join her on annihilating Nelly Yuki. Serena and Georgina are drunk and having fun. Two guys offer to get them more drinks. Georgina's phone rings and it's a drug dealer. Serena leaves in a hurry. She calls Chuck for help. She is supposed to be with Dan, so she asks Chuck to help her out. Chuck calls Dan and tells him that Serena has food poisoning. Dan doesn't believe him.

Dan finds Chuck in the morning. He tells Chuck to leave Serena alone. Serena shows up and she accidentally says her migraines are better instead of food poisoning. Dan wants her to explain things to him. He leaves after the bell rings and Serena tells Chuck how she hates Georgina's being there. Penelope and Hazel try to get information out of Nelly Yuki. Nelly mentions how she doesn't want to hear Flo Rida ever again. Her boyfriend broke up with her at a Flo Rida concert. Jenny and Elise run into the dog-walker again. It turns out that he's rich. Jenny then gets interested in him. Blair sees Nelly studying, so she turns on Flo Rida and walks by. Nelly mentions her break-up, so Blair comforts her. She then invites Nelly to her penthouse to let all her feelings out. Vanessa is waiting at a diner for Nate. Nate shows up and after the waitress says Nate's name, he explains that his father is in rehab a couple blocks away. Vanessa feels bad while Nate explains how he comes here afterwards. Vanessa apologizes to him for reading one of his practice essays. She begins to see that Nate isn't like a regular rich snob. Georgina calls Serena and wants to make it up to her. Georgina says that Serena's transformation for the better is an inspiration to her. Georgina wants to have dinner with her, but Serena is reluctant because she has SATs in the morning. Serena agrees to dinner for only an hour.

Dan is studying. He tells Jenny that he is distracted by Serena. Jenny finishes all her homework and Rufus pulls out a sewing machine for her. She is so happy, but when Rufus says she's still grounded. Jenny mentions that she wants to meet with a guy tomorrow. He doesn't want her to date, so she gets angry and goes to her room. At Blair's spa treatment, Nelly Yuki is relaxed. Her ex-boyfriend, Todd, shows up. Nelly is happy to see him. He wants to talk to her. Nelly is happy and thanks Blair. Unfortunately, Nelly doesn't know Blair's plan. Nate and Vanessa are walking together and having a good time. He asks Vanessa why she takes SATs practice tests without the intention of taking the real SATs. They continue to have a good time until they get to Vanessa's workplace. They share their first kiss here. Serena and Georgina are having dinner. To Serena's surprise, Georgina refuses a cocktail. Serena tells her more about Dan and their relationship. Serena goes to call Dan. Georgina slips a drug into Serena's soda. They drink to the new Serena.

The next morning, Serena wakes up wondering where she is. Georgina comes in and Serena panics about the SATs. She calls Chuck and asks him to help out and try to keep the doors open for her. Nate meets Vanessa at her restaurant. Nate wants to take her somewhere. Vanessa decides to go along with him. Rufus and Jenny are eating breakfast. She is still angry at him. Jenny asks again to let her go. Rufus makes her cancel with Asher. Nate takes Vanessa to the SATs. He convinces her to take it to have options. Nelly Yuki shows up and Blair asks her how her night was. Todd doesn't want to get back together and Nelly stayed up all night crying. Blair takes the batteries from her calculator. Blair asks Dan where Serena is, but he doesn't know. Dan starts to leave Serena a voicemail. He then sees a girl claim she is Serena van der Woodsen.

Blair and Dan spot Nate and Vanessa together getting into a limo. Dan goes to Serena and Chuck's. Serena tells him that she had a food poisoning relapse. He confronts her about a girl getting paid to be her. Chuck did it and Serena didn't know. Dan wants to understand what's going on, but Serena says they'll talk tomorrow. Serena tells Chuck that he went too far. Apparently, there's something so bad between Georgina and Serena that she can't tell anyone. Serena shows up at Georgina's. She tells her that she never wants to see her again. Georgina brings up the incident and Serena says that if she goes down, Georgina's going down with her. Serena tells her to stay out of her life. Asher comes to Jenny's apartment. Jenny is surprised to see him. Asher brought her hot dogs and apologizes to them. He butters up to Rufus and he lets him come in. Dan is outside. He runs into Georgina. She introduces herself as Sarah. They seem to get along.

== Reception ==
"Desperately Seeking Serena" was watched by 2.53 million viewers.

Vogue included the episode on its list of the 20 best episodes in the series.

== International titles ==
- Czech Republic: Sereno, kde jsi? (Serena, Where Are You?)

== Featured Music ==
- "Do the Panic" by Phantom Planet
- "Campus" by Vampire Weekend
- "Crimewave" by Crystal Castles VS Health
- "Nice Sweet Sexy" by DIFX ft. Imperio & Cru
- "Elevator" by Flo Rida
- "We Started Nothing" by The Ting Tings

== Trivia ==
- Title comes from the 1985 film Desperately Seeking Susan.
- Although credited, Kelly Rutherford (Lily van der Woodsen) does not appear in this episode.
- Mischa Barton, who had previously worked with show's developers Josh Schwartz and Stephanie Savage in The OC, was the show's producers initial choice to portray Georgina Sparks.
- Vanessa's parents didn't go to college.
- Isabel is a concert pianist.
- Penelope is a National Merit Scholar.
- Vanessa's sister is part of a lesbian punk band.
- Dan used to play T-ball.
- Jenny is allergic to cats.
