= Georgina Sparks =

Fictional character

- Gossip Girl character
- Michelle Trachtenberg as Georgina Sparks
- First appearance: Novel: Because I'm Worth It; Television: "Desperately Seeking Serena" (2007, episode 15)
- Last appearance: Novel series: I Like It Like That; Television: "Dress Me Up! Dress Me Down!" (2021, episode 140)
- Created by: Character; Cecily von Ziegesar; Developed for Television; Josh Schwartz; Stephanie Savage
- Portrayed by: Michelle Trachtenberg

In-universe information
- Full name: Georgina Sparks
- Aliases: G Sarah; Svetlana; Sherilyn Phillips; Television: Gossip Girl 2.0 (step-in)
- Nicknames: Novels: Georgie
- Occupation: Television: College student (at New York University; dropped out); Socialite; Gossip Girl
- Spouses: Television: Philip Becker
- Children: Television: Milo (son, with Serge)

Georgina Sparks is a fictional character in the Gossip Girl novel series and a recurring character on the television series of the same name, in which she was portrayed by Michelle Trachtenberg.

While the novel series portrays her as a harmless, friendly drug-addicted girl, the television adaptation portrays her as a cruel, manipulative young socialite who creates havoc throughout the show. Originally conceived as the series' primary antagonist, by the final season Georgina came into the good graces of the Upper East Side - even becoming a member of their inner circle.

She is notable for her manipulative machinations and sudden returns throughout the series, and for appearing in all the finales, and most recently the latter half of the fifth season in light of cast members Taylor Momsen and Jessica Szohr departing. In the sixth season of the show, she appears in eight of ten episodes. Georgina also appears in the second season of the HBO Max sequel series.

== Novel series ==
Georgina Spark (Sparks in the television series), known as Georgie, is a pretty New York celebutante and probably the wealthiest character in the saga. She somewhat resembles Snow White: she is slim and has long, straight, silky dark brown hair, almost black, thin black eyebrows, dark brown eyes, dark red lips, pale skin and an average-sized bust. She is a talented equestrian who has won numerous awards. A rumor has it that she studied at the same boarding school — Hanover Academy — as Serena. Georgie is fatherless and her mother largely neglects her. Lost and adrift, she has an addictive personality and often behaves in extravagant and reckless ways. Among other things, she sold her favorite competition horse to buy fifty grams of cocaine. She lost all her friends because of her troubles. She and Nate meet during a stay in rehab at the Rupture Breakaway. They date for a while and, one evening, when Nate comes to see her at her mansion, the young woman overdoses after taking an excessive amount of various pills. The golden boy then saves her life by contacting their addiction counselor. They later go together to Sun Valley for spring break, where Georgie runs into Serena and Blair Waldorf. Georgie’s relationship with Nate ends when she and Chuck Bass are arrested by the police for sledding completely naked on a public highway. She then returns to rehab, this time in Switzerland.

In sixth grade, she and Chuck lost their virginity together.

She gave Chuck a South American snow monkey as a thank-you to his parents for getting them both out of jail and then covering up the incident. Contrary to what is shown in the television series, Georgina gets along fairly well with Serena and Chuck. Her mother and Misty Bass are cousins, which even makes her and Chuck third cousins[11]. A notable difference between her character in the book and in the television series is that, in the novels, Georgina has no cruel intentions toward anyone and interacts only minimally with the main characters. She gets along quite well with Serena and Chuck, although they do not spend much time together.

== Television series ==
=== Casting ===
Tim Stack of Entertainment Weekly reported that Michelle Trachtenberg took on the role that actress Mischa Barton had been previously offered. The Buffy alumna was cast into the role of Georgina Sparks, described by Michael Ausiello as "an adolescent Cruella". Creator Josh Schwartz states that, "Georgina was [Serena's] enabler, her best friend, and her id." The actress stated that the character is "basically the evil bitch from hell" and that "She's been part of the Gossip kids' lives for a long time, and she's coming back around to make her presence known." She describes the role as "the best character I have ever played," saying "It's awesome playing the bad girl," and compared her previous role on Buffy as something very different from her current role as Georgina. She has stated that the character is "incredibly evil, manipulative and pretty much just takes no prisoners, and she doesn't care about the consequences." Trachtenberg also draws her on her "own painful teen experience in her L.A. private school," citing her work on Harriet the Spy as an inspiration for her portrayal of the character.

=== Season 1 ===
Georgina Sparks, a girl who had frequently partied with Serena van der Woodsen, returns to New York from Switzerland. Georgina is first mentioned in "The Blair Bitch Project" when Serena discovers that she had been sending her packages of champagne, porn, sex toys and drugs—not Chuck. Serena apologizes to Chuck and shows him Georgina's recent letter. However, he later reassures her that Georgina is still in Switzerland.

Although Chuck has assured her, Georgina steals her family's jet and arrives in Manhattan to surprise Serena with a visit to her high school, Constance Billard, during the "Desperately Seeking Serena" episode. Serena's plans to study with Dan Humphrey for the SATs are interrupted when Georgina persuades her to go out and catch up with each other over drinks. She reluctantly agrees, but after a few cocktails, her wild-child persona returns. However, she answers a call from Georgina's phone, revealing she had still been in contact with drug dealers. Serena leaves the bar, realizing that Georgina has stayed the same. Since she had missed her study date with Dan, Chuck helps Serena conceal the truth—claiming she had suffered from food poisoning the previous night. When Serena realizes Georgina's intentions, she reverts to her good-girl persona. Serena apologizes for the missed study plans and says she will meet Dan and Blair at the SATs the next day. Georgina calls, asking Serena to go out to dinner. She initially declines the offer, but Georgina assures her it will just be a casual drink between friends. To further persuade her, Georgina tells her how she has been inspired to change her ways after seeing Serena the other day. Impressed, Serena meets Georgina for dinner, who compliments her on how much she's changed. With Serena being distracted on a call with Dan, Georgina had slipped unknown drugs into Serena's Diet Coke. Serena frantically wakes up in Georgina's apartment the next morning and misses the SATs. Georgina packs her bags to leave Manhattan until Serena confronts her, seeking to end their friendship, having realized that she makes too many mistakes when she's around her. Georgina recounts a past incident which Serena quickly dismisses. This incident is revealed later in the season and becomes a significant plot point for Serena. Unfortunately for Serena, Georgina changes her mind, unpacks her bags and meets Dan in Central Park while introducing herself as Sarah.

Determined to impose her presence in Serena's life, Georgina becomes friends with Dan and Vanessa under the guise of Sarah. Georgina sends Serena a video of what appears to be Serena in a sex tape. Afterwards, she invites herself into the van der Woodsen's home, subsequently outing Eric during dinner. Distressed, Serena runs to Dan; he introduces her to Sarah, who Serena is shocked to discover is Georgina in disguise. Georgina then proceeds to blackmail Serena with the video threatening to reveal all the dark secrets from her past.

Serena has a breakdown and eventually confides in Blair, Nate and Chuck. She reveals to her friends an instance from her past that brought her guilt: After Serena had sex with Nate at a wedding, Serena joined Georgina and a boy named Pete Fairman at a hotel. Georgina hid a video camera in the room to film a sex tape of Pete and Serena. Serena was not in the mood, though, and instead passed Pete a line of cocaine which he subsequently overdosed on. Panicked, Serena called the emergency services, and she and Georgina fled the hotel. After learning that Pete had died, Serena ran away to boarding school.

Chuck lost his virginity to Georgina in sixth grade; he recalls her partying attitude before Serena abruptly left for boarding school. Serena explains that Georgina is blackmailing her into continuing the lifestyle they used to have.

At Rufus's concert, Nate tells Vanessa about Sarah's true identity. However, Georgina has successfully deceived Dan by confessing her real name and a tale about needing the identity of Sarah. She concocted a story about an abusive ex-boyfriend, which caused her to need a disguise from her past. When Georgina learns about Dan and Serena's breakup due to her constant lies to cover up secrets, Georgina tells Dan she fell in love with him at first sight. After they kissed, Georgina calls Serena on Dan's phone. She claims, “all bets are off,” implying she will have sex with him that night. Dan and Georgina then walk away together, holding hands.

The next morning Serena confronts Georgina at Dan's apartment and furiously tries to attack her. After Georgina leaves; Serena with Blair’s assistance tells Dan the truth about Georgina. Dan believes Serena, and devises a plan to get rid of Georgina. Dan calls Georgina up and has her meet him in Central Park; he consequently leaves her after she confesses her feelings for him and is met by Blair who has tracked down Georgina's parents. Blair reveals that Georgina was supposed to be at an equestrian circuit but sold her show pony for cocaine. Georgina was in fact in a rehabilitation center in Utah where she escaped, hitchhiked into a town, stole a credit card and booked a ticket to Ibiza. Georgina is left with her parents who decide her fate by sending her to a boot camp for troubled young girls, originally where Lily threatened to send Serena amidst her daughters old habits returning, upon Blair's suggestion.

=== Season 2 ===
Georgina Sparks returns in the second season but is transformed into a sweet woman believing in the power of Jesus. Although she appears to have genuinely changed, she is rejected by Blair, Chuck, Dan and Serena who all do not take her seriously. Blair eventually uses her in a scheme that would have Poppy Lifton arrested after a Ponzi scheme she had concocted with Gabriel compromised Serena's reputation. Georgina unfortunately loses the money that she intended to buy Bibles for Christian children to Poppy, Blair accuses her of sabotaging the plan and that she will never be forgiven by Jesus as well as herself. Georgina, upset and adamant that she didn't do anything wrong, reverts to her old self at the end of the episode, with the intent of getting her money back. She calls Blair, scolding her for being unable to get rid of Poppy and confirming her return to her old habits by telling her, "You can tell Jesus that the bitch is back."

In the second-season finale, Georgina returns and informs Dan that Poppy Lifton has been taken care of and that the money has been returned. In a twist, she also reveals that she will be attending NYU the following year, where she is enrolled at the Gallatin School of Individualized Study. She also requests to be Blair Waldorf's roommate.

=== Season 3 ===
Georgina returns to the Upper East Side in disguise, on episode "Last Tango, Then Paris".

Georgina appears in the third season of the show as Blair's roommate. She convinces Dan and Vanessa that she has changed, even though she is plotting revenge against Blair. She starts a relationship with Dan, not realizing that he was not interested in anything serious. Georgina is still up to her old ways by sending Blair on a wild goose chase for entering a secret society. After Serena discovers this scheme tells Dan that Georgina created a scheme that threatened to ruin Chuck and Blair's relationship, he decides to end things with her. It is then revealed that she has grown very attached to Dan. Because he broke things off with her, she plans to find another way to cause more damage. At the end of the third episode in the season, Georgina plans to make a trip to Boston after she overhears Scott bidding farewell to Vanessa, with that Scott Adler is in fact Rufus and Lily's son.

Georgina returns from Boston only to learn that Dan is dating Olivia Burke. Georgina then blackmails Vanessa to get Dan to dump Olivia or she'll reveal to everyone that she knows about Scott's secret, knowing that Vanessa's friendship with the Humphreys could be jeopardized if they found out that she had been hiding secrets from them. Vanessa later confesses to Dan about her own knowledge of Scott's true identity and the fact that Georgina is using this to blackmail her. Georgina crashes Rufus' wedding where Dan and Georgina share a conversation that reveals that Poppy Lifton had been deported. Georgina arrives at the wedding and reveals to Rufus and Lily that Scott is their lovechild and leaves, taking a slice of the wedding cake and driving Blair to get rid of her. Georgina is last seen in a bar with Vanya, disguised as a prince, who leaves with her, stating that he'll be taking her to Belarus. Dorota is shown looking on, hinting that it was Blair behind the entire scenario to get rid of Georgina.

The third-season finale has Georgina return from Belarus wearing a blond wig and large coat, desperately seeking the help of various Upper-East Siders with her "problem." However, they all dismiss Georgina, as Blair is too worried about Chuck to listen to her, and Dan and Serena do not notice her new disguise while at the hospital. In the season finale, Georgina arrives at the loft with "something" of Dan's. It is revealed that Georgina is pregnant with what she says is Dan's child.

=== Season 4 ===
In the season premiere "Belles de Jour" it is revealed Georgina had a son, Milo, born on July 7, 2010, but it is unknown if Dan Humphrey is the father at first because they never did a DNA test. Georgina then gives a fake DNA test so that Dan will sign Milo's birth certificate. It is later revealed to be another one of her schemes when she abruptly leaves New York, leaving Dan alone with Milo. She left a note saying that she went to the "spa". Whilst she is away, Rufus does a DNA test himself, and breaks the news to Dan that he isn't Milo's biological father. In the episode "The Undergraduates", Georgina returns from the "spa" (she was in fact in St. Barts) to collect Milo, and ends up telling Dan about Serge, Milo's real father, because he knows that she has been lying. She also declares that she and Milo are going to live with Georgina's parents. Georgina returns in the season finale attending a Constance Billiard alumni dance. She reveals to Serena that she is living in Bedford, New York and is now married, but bored, from the lifestyle she sought to raise her son in. Georgina seeks to maintain her need to scheme as she offers her aid in catching Charlie, finding out later that she has her own agenda - one that Georgina takes interest in. She offers her home phone number to Charlie and tells her to give her a call in case she ever needs her.

=== Season 5 ===
Georgina returns to the Upper East Side with her husband, Phil, for the royal wedding of Blair and Louis in order to ruin Blair's happy ending as revenge for the many things Blair has done to her. She is caught inside the church by Rufus and Lily who have her thrown out, but not before she ends up recording Blair's confession of love to Chuck before the wedding commences. Georgina leaves the video in Chuck's hands. After 'Gossip Girl' plays the video, Georgina is confronted by Dan, Nate and Serena, but Georgina denies any involvement and accuses each of them of sending the video, before promptly leaving. Georgina is seen to be posting a blast on the Gossip Girl website.

After Blair's wedding, Georgina locks Dorota in Blair's closet in an attempt to find Blair and destroy what she thinks is Blair's "happily ever after". When Chuck and Serena free Dorota, she follows them to the hotel in which Dan and Blair are hiding out and takes a photo while framing Serena for sending the video to Gossip Girl. After taking her camera back from Serena, Georgina is seen putting up a video of Blair and Louis leaving for their honeymoon. Georgina reveals to Phil, her husband/accomplice, that the real 'Gossip Girl' abandoned her post following Chuck and Blair's accident. Phil appears to love Georgina and knows all about her past and of her agenda against everyone she knows on the Upper East Side and he assists her in times of need despite the fact that she often treats him badly and ignores their baby, Milo, leaving Phil as the parental caregiver at home while she goes out to work her ways.

Following Blair's return from her honeymoon, Georgina learns that Ivy is back in town and goes to the Van der Woodsens' to confront her. While at a party thrown by Nate, Dan discovers that she is Gossip Girl and he blackmails her with this information as she is trying to get Blair to default on her marriage to Louis, thereby effectively ruining her family's financial security. Georgina and Serena witness a kiss between Dan and Blair that Georgina manages to get a photo of.

Georgina appears briefly in the season finale. Dan, having seemingly been dumped by Blair, alienated and betrayed by Serena, Lily, Chuck, Nate and everyone that he knows, approaches Georgina, asking for help to publish the sequel to "Inside", pledging to write the novel "he should have written from the beginning". Georgina, with her own personal score to settle with all of the characters of the Upper East side, is happy to help.

=== Season 6 ===
At the start of Season 6, Georgina is working as Dan's book agent, and she works to secure publications that would be willing to publish his exposé about the Upper East Side. However, she also helps Chuck, Blair, Serena, Ivy and Sage Spence take down Chuck's father, Bart Bass. In the series finale, after Bart has fallen to his death after his rooftop confrontation with Chuck, Georgina helps Blair and Chuck escape the crime scene. Georgina ends up teaming with Jack Bass to bring everyone together for Chuck and Blair's wedding. After it is revealed that Dan has been acting as Gossip Girl, Georgina (along with the other characters) realizes that it's time to move on from the fighting and backstabbing and move on with life. At the time jump at the end of the episode, it's revealed that she and Jack have become a couple, and has also become friends with the other members of the circle.

=== 2021 sequel series ===
Milo, Georgina's son, appears in the first season of the 2021 sequel series. Milo is diabolical and inherited his mother’s intellectual brilliance. In the episode "Fire Walks with Z", he invites Zoya to Georgina's home. She is absent but several photos of her with famous men can be seen. She also has a portrait of Blair Waldorf in her house.

Georgina returns in the episode "How to Bury a Millionaire" from season two after discovering Kate's is behind the new Gossip Girl. She blackmails Kate into working for her. However, she leaves after Kate ruined her plan.

== Reception ==
CNN included the introduction of Georgina in the list of the series' "OMG" moments, writing that she is "the kind of insane yet hilarious character that can make any episode better." Chicago Tribune described her as "one of the series' all-time best troublemakers." BuddyTV found Georgina "amazing" in the 100th episode, "you can't even take your eyes off her because she's so great in every scene." Sparks was included in TV Guide's list of the best TV bitches. However, Entertainment Weekly named her one of the "21 Most Annoying TV Characters Ever". Trachtenberg was nominated at the 2012 Teen Choice Awards under the category "Choice TV Villain" for her portrayal of Sparks.
