= Patrick Heusinger =

American actor (born 1981)

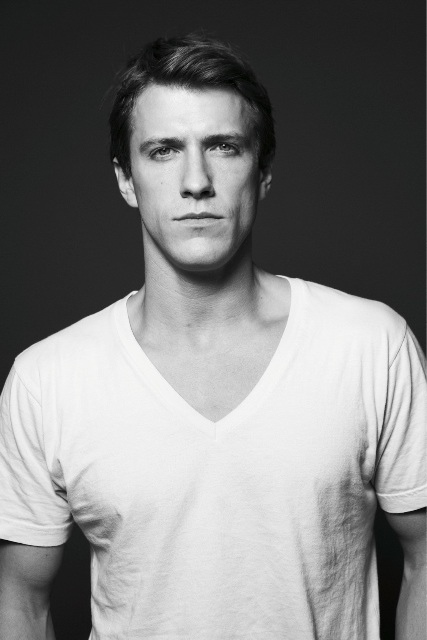
- Heusinger in 2008
- Born: February 14, 1981 (age 45); Jacksonville, Florida, U.S.
- Education: Juilliard School (BFA)
- Occupation: Actor
- Years active: 2005–present

Patrick Heusinger (born February 14, 1981) is an American actor. He is known for his recurring roles as James Schuller / Lord Marcus Beaton on the second season of The CW teen drama series Gossip Girl (2008), Adam Pierce on the USA Network medical comedy drama series Royal Pains (2010–11), and Max McCarthy on the Bravo comedy drama series Girlfriends' Guide to Divorce (2014–17). Heusinger is also known for his lead role as FBI Special Agent Nick Durand on the Amazon Prime Video crime thriller series Absentia (2017–20).

== Early life ==
Heusinger was born and raised in Jacksonville, Florida, where he attended Douglas Anderson School of the Arts. He is a graduate of Juilliard.

== Career ==
Heusinger made his debut in the 2005 independent period drama film Sweet Land, as young Lars, and then appeared in Tie a Yellow Ribbon, The Nanny Diaries, and Black Swan.

On television, Heusinger is known for the roles of Lord Marcus on the CW teen drama Gossip Girl, where he appeared on four episodes in 2008, and Adam on USA Network's Royal Pains in 2010 and 2011. He was also in a recurring role as Max McCarthy on Bravo TV's first original scripted series Girlfriends' Guide to Divorce. Other television credits include 30 Rock, The Good Wife, Law & Order: Special Victims Unit, Rescue Me, Unforgettable, and Necessary Roughness.

Heusinger starred as Lancelot in the national tour of Spamalot from 2006 through 2008. In 2010, he starred in the Naked Angels' Tony-nominated Broadway production of Next Fall. Other theater credits include the off-Broadway production of Next Fall and the Broadway revival of Fiddler on the Roof (as Fyedka). Between 2024 and 2026, he starred as James in the stage production of Paranormal Activity at the Leeds Playhouse theatre, during its subsequent US Tour, and later at the Ambassadors Theatre on London’s West End.

In 2009, Heusinger appeared in the comedy web series Jack in a Box. In 2010 and 2011, he appeared in the comedy web series Submissions Only. In 2013, he had a guest-starring story arc on the NBC survival drama series Revolution as bounty hunter Adam. In 2015, he had a guest-starring role on the Hulu original series, Casual, as Michael, a photography teacher. Heusinger was cast as Special Agent Nick Durand in the AXN series Absentia that premiered in 2017.

== Filmography ==
=== Film ===
Year	Title	Role	Notes
2005	Sweet Land	Young Lars	
2007	Tie a Yellow Ribbon	Joe Mason	
2007	The Nanny Diaries	Carter	
2007	Skin-Deep	Jared	Short film
2010	Black Swan	Rich Gent	
2012	Willowbrook	Bill Huntsman	Short film
2012	Snow White and the Seven Movies	Agent	Short film
2012	Frances Ha	Reade 'Patch' Krause	
2013	Cause of Death	Guy In The park	Short film
2015	A Beautiful Now	Aaron	
2016	Jack Reacher: Never Go Back	The Hunter	
2018	Accommodations	Jake Somner	

=== Television ===
Year	Title	Role	Notes
2008	Gossip Girl	James Schuller / Lord Marcus Beaton	4 episodes
2009	30 Rock	Brian	Episode: "Generalissimo"
2009	The Good Wife	Ray Demory	Episode: "Fixed"
2009	Law & Order: Special Victims Unit	Brady Harrison	Episode: "Perverted"
2010	Rescue Me	Steve Burton	Episode: "Comeback"
2010–2011	Royal Pains	Adam Pierce	4 episodes
2011	CSI: Miami	Matthew Shaw	Episode: "Match Made in Hell"
2011	Law & Order: LA	Dan Rathman	Episode: "Angel's Knoll"
2011	The Protector	Unknown	Episode: "Wings"
2011	Necessary Roughness	Cash Carson	Episode: "Losing Your Swing"
2011	Friends with Benefits	Austin	2 episodes
2011	Unforgettable	Dean	Episode: "Friended"
2013	Revolution	Adam	3 episodes
2013	Bones	Martin Proctor	Episode: "The Lady on the List"
2013	Castle	Raymond Vance	Episode: "Number One Fan"
2014–2017	Girlfriends' Guide to Divorce	Max McCarthy	11 episodes
2015	A to Z	Jay	Episode: "M is for Meant to Be"
2015	Casual	Michael Carr	7 episodes
2017–2020	Absentia	Nick Durand	Main role
2018–2020	Corporate	Joshua	2 episodes
2022	Law & Order	Wyatt Ackman	Episode: "The Great Pretender"
2024	Parish	Travis	Episode: "A Good Man"

=== Web ===
Year	Title	Role	Notes
2009	Jack in a Box	Coy	Episode: "The Alpha Actor"
2010–2011	Submissions Only	Eric Hennigan	4 episodes
2014	Writers' Block	Eli	Episode: "Flirting with Disaster"

=== Video games ===
Year	Title	Role	Notes
2016	Quantum Break	Liam Burke	Voice, motion capture performance, and full motion video cutscenes
