= Film School Rejects =

American film blog

- Website type: Film blog
- Available in: English
- Headquarters: Austin, Texas
- Creator: Neil Miller
- Website: www.filmschoolrejects.com
- Commercial: Yes
- Launched: February 15, 2006; 20 years ago
- Current status: Inactive

Film School Rejects was an American blog devoted to movie reviews, interviews, film industry news, and feature commentary. It was founded by Neil Miller in February 2006.

The site was nominated for Best News Blog by Total Film magazine and named one of the 50 best blogs for filmmakers by MovieMaker magazine. Its weekly podcast, Reject Radio, was voted as the fourth best podcast for movie fans by Movies.com.

Film School Rejects and its contributors have been featured and quoted in regional and national media outlets, including CNN, the Los Angeles Times, Mashable, and American Public Media. The site's April Fools' Day pranks have been covered on MTV, Fandango, and BuzzFeed.

Film School Rejects went up for sale in December 2024, and went offline in 2025.

== Awards and recognitions ==
- #4 Best Podcast for Movie Fans – Movies.com, 2012
- #3 Best Movie Blog – BlogRank, 2012
- 50 Best Blogs for Filmmakers – MovieMaker magazine, 2010
- Best News Blog (nominated) – Total Film, 2010
- Site of the Week – AMC, 2008
