= Chuck Bass =

Fictional character

- Gossip Girl character
- Ed Westwick as Charles Bass
- First appearance: Novel: Gossip Girl; Television: "Pilot" (episode 1.01)
- Last appearance: Novel: I Will Always Love You; Television: "New York, I Love You XOXO" (episode 6.10)
- Created by: Character: Cecily von Ziegesar; Developed for television: Josh Schwartz; Stephanie Savage
- Portrayed by: Ed Westwick

In-universe information
- Full name: Charles Bartholomew Bass
- Alias: C
- Nickname: Chuck
- Title(s): Television: CEO of Bass Industries
- Occupation: Novels: College Student at the University of Oxford (graduated); College Student at Deep Springs College (graduated); High School Student at Riverside Preparatory School for Boys (graduated); Fashion Model (formerly); Television: Entrepreneur; High school student (at St. Jude's; graduated)
- Family: Novels: Bartholomew Bass (father); Misty Bass (mother); Donald Bass (brother); Mrs Spark (maternal second cousin); Georgina Spark (maternal third cousin); Sweetie (pet; snow monkey); Television: Barth "Bart" Bass (father; deceased); Jack Bass (Uncle); Elizabeth Fisher (mother; alias: Evelyn Bass); Lillian "Lily" van der Woodsen (adoptive mother; née Rhodes); Serena van der Woodsen (adoptive sister); Eric van der Woodsen (adoptive brother)
- Spouses: Television: Blair Waldorf
- Children: Television: Henry Charles Bass (with Blair; flash-forward)
- Home: Novels: Plaza Hotel; Television: Empire Hotel; Palace Hotel
- Birthdate: January 19, 1991

Charles Bartholomew Bass is a fictional character in the novel and television series Gossip Girl. In the TV series, he is portrayed by British actor Ed Westwick. Although he is a secondary antagonist in the original book series, the TV series elevates him to an antiheroic main character, and the male lead of the show, where he is noted for his financial ambition, hedonism and personal style.

Since they were children, Chuck has been best friends with Nate Archibald, Serena van der Woodsen and Blair Waldorf, who is his main romantic interest throughout the series. In the TV series, he is also step-brother to Serena and Eric van der Woodsen.

== Novel series ==
Charles Bartholomew Bass is introduced by author Cecily von Ziegesar in her Gossip Girl series of teen novels, the first of which was published in 2002. He got his nickname, Chuck Bass, from his signature chuckle in a bass tone, which often sounds like a raspy whisper. Chuck's role is initially that of an antagonist to the main characters. He is described as really handsome, tall, slim, muscular, dark and brooding with firm abs, naturally tanned skin, straight black hair and deep brown eyes. He resides with his family at the Plaza Hotel on the Upper East Side. Unlike in the television adaptation, Chuck Bass plays only a minor role in the book series (the main characters each get their own alternating chapters but he does not). He is the eldest son of billionaires Bartholomew (“Bart”) and Misty Bass and the heir of the Bass leather and luxury goods fortune and has a brother, Donald. He is an egocentric, arrogant, obnoxious, narcissistic, misogynistic, and spiteful character who attempts on several occasions throughout the saga to sexually assault his female classmates (like Kati Farkas, Serena and Jenny). Very attractive, he pursues a modeling career for a time. Most of the characters in the series despise him but because he is extremely wealthy, everyone tolerates his presence. He is described as having flamboyant fashion sense, with a penchant for scarves. Lazy and vain, Chuck's only interests are sex and money, and he is frequently chided by his father for lacking ambition and performing poorly in school.

As the story progresses, he reveals more of his bisexuality and even attempts to seduce Dan. He has a lot of flings with numerous girls and boys throughout the novels. It is revealed he lost his virginity to Georgina Spark, his third cousin, back in sixth grade. During his high school years, he attends Riverside Prep, a private boys’ school, with his best friends, Roger Paine and Jefferson Prescott. A careless student with mediocre grades, Chuck is not admitted to any of the universities he applies to during his senior year. His father then threatens to send him to military school but ultimately finds a compromise: he enrolls his rebellious son at Deep Springs College, known for its unconventional learning methods.

After two years, Chuck returns with a noticeably calmer demeanor before completing his studies at the University of Oxford in the United Kingdom. His behavior is portrayed as having changed considerably from his earlier characterization, becoming more considerate and protective of others.

During this time, he reconnects with Nate, who becomes his best friend, and later begins a romantic relationship with Blair that lasts 12 months. Chuck’s pet is a female snow monkey he received from Georgina Spark, Sweetie, whom he takes everywhere with him, dresses like himself and considers his best friend.

== TV series ==
Chuck Bass was then reconfigured as a more central character, an antiheroic playboy whose on-off relationship with Blair Waldorf serves as one of the show's major ongoing storylines. Chuck is the resident "bad boy" of the Upper East Side, and like Blair, is both vengeful and manipulative; the two often scheme elaborate plans together. As the show progresses, Chuck develops a softer side, specifically towards Blair, his chief love interest, and Lily, Eric, and Serena, his adoptive mother, brother, and sister.

=== Season 1 ===
Chuck grew up on the Upper East Side with his three best friends and fellow elites Nate Archibald, Blair Waldorf, and future-stepsister Serena van der Woodsen. His father is Bart Bass, a self-made billionaire, which is irregular, compared to the Bass' old money friends. Although he is popular in school, he doesn't have many other friends than the three mentioned, and it's learned that others hang out with him due to his father wealth. Chuck is often described as the "bad boy of his circle", being a playboy and womanizer who sees women as recreational tools. He frequently skips class and smokes cannabis.

When speaking about Serena in the pilot episode, Chuck says, "Serena looked effin' hot last night. There's something wrong with that level of perfection. It needs to be violated." In the same episode, Chuck attempts to rape both Serena and Jenny Humphrey. With time, he attenuates his behaviors as a sexual predator and becomes more of a manipulating womanizer. However, his lecherous attitude continues as he makes multiple advances on his step-sister at the time, Serena.

In episode three, "Poison Ivy", Chuck gets interviewed for an usher position for a school event with representatives from Ivy League colleges, and answers the question why he should get the spot simply with "I'm Chuck Bass", a phrase that he continues to utter on multiple occasions throughout the series to justify his behavior or boast about his reputation.

In episode seven, "Victor/Victrola", Chuck purchases a burlesque club, Victrola. After Nate and Blair break up, Blair visits Chuck at Victrola where she ends up performing on stage and later loses her virginity to him in the back of his limousine. Though she tries to deny the encounter, Chuck buys a necklace for her and admits that he feels "butterflies" in her presence, leading to a clandestine sexual relationship. Despite this, Nate and Blair rekindle their relationship, and a jealous Chuck reveals secret relationship with Blair to the anonymous "Gossip Girl". This leads Chuck to have a temporary rift with both Blair and Nate.

As Bart Bass and Lily van der Woodsen's relationship progresses, they decide to move their families in together. Chuck and Eric van der Woodsen, Lily's son and Serena's younger brother, become especially close. When Serena begins receiving mysterious packages (pornography in the mail, alcohol delivered to her at school), she automatically blames Chuck, who had made multiple remarks expressing his desire to sleep with her. Bart subsequently forces Chuck to move out of the family home. Serena discovers that the culprit was actually Georgina Sparks, a past classmate of both Serena and Chuck. It is later revealed that Chuck lost his virginity to Georgina in the sixth grade. Chuck and Blair join together to prevent Georgina from further harming and embarrassing Serena. This process rekindles their bond, and they succeed in getting rid of Georgina.

At Bart and Lily's wedding at the end of Season 1, Chuck apologizes and confesses to Nate that he was in love with Blair. During the wedding reception, Chuck gives a speech about forgiveness that is implied to be directed towards Blair. She accepts his apology and the two kiss. A week later however, as they are about to embark on a trip to Tuscany together, Chuck gets cold feet when his father praises how the relationship with Blair would make him "grow up". Blair leaves for Tuscany without him, as Chuck has decided to seduce Amelia, tossing the roses for Blair in the trash can.

=== Season 2 ===
In the season premiere, "Summer Kind of Wonderful", we learn Blair has stayed in Europe. Chuck regretted his actions but told this to Blair too late as she was already dating Lord Marcus Beaton. Blair asks Chuck to tell her he loves her, but his fear of commitment stops him.

In order to gather material for a story, Dan tags along with Chuck for a night, ending with the two of them in jail after a fistfight. While in jail, Chuck tells Dan in confidence that Chuck's mother died while giving birth to him, and that his father blames him for her death, which explains their icy relationship. When Chuck later discovers that Dan was using him for a story, he feels betrayed and tells Dan that he was lying about all of it.

Chuck's storyline throughout season 2 mainly deals with his inability to tell Blair that he loves her. Eventually, his father is killed in a car accident. Then as he is about to leave after the funeral. Blair tells him that she loves him, but he leaves nevertheless. Lily adopts him so that he's able to own Bass Industries, making Serena and Eric his sister and brother. When Blair begins dating Nate again, Chuck realizes his true feelings for her. The two team up to take down Poppy Lifton, and Blair realizes that she still has feelings for Chuck as well. She breaks up with Nate. After finding out through a GossipGirl blast that Blair had sex with his uncle, he leaves after Blair tells him she loves him for the second time. In the final episode of season 2, Chuck admits to Blair his true feelings and the two finally begin a relationship.

=== Season 3 ===
When Season 3 returns, Chuck and Blair are very happy and very much in love. Chuck struggles to run Bass Industries to his deceased father's impeccably high standards. He buys The Empire Hotel. Halfway through the season, Chuck meets a woman claiming to be his mother called Elizabeth Fisher. After initially rejecting her, Chuck finally accepts Elizabeth and is then met with a sexual harassment claim from his former employees. Despite his innocence, he settles to keep the scandal out of the media. Jack Bass, Chuck's sinister uncle, informs the media anyway and necessitates Chuck signing the hotel over to Elizabeth to appease the public. She betrays him and signs the hotel over to Jack, whom she loves. However, she calls Chuck to say goodbye and reveals that Jack chose the hotel over her. She then reveals to Chuck that she is not his mother and she does not know whether his real mother is alive or dead.

Chuck and Blair agree to team up to take down Jack to get the hotel back. Jack tells them both (separately) that he will only give up the hotel if he has sex with Blair. Unbeknown to Blair, Chuck sets the situation up and Blair goes to Jack's. After a kiss, Jack tells Blair the truth about Chuck's involvement. Blair breaks up with Chuck and he gets the hotel back, vowing to get Blair back too. Chuck tries desperately to win Blair back, doing everything from banning all of the other Upper East Side men from dating her to asking her to meet him on top of the Empire State Building. Blair decides that Chuck is her true love and she's going to meet him, but Dorota suddenly goes into labor and she ends up being two hours late. Chuck, thinking she is finally over him, leaves the building heartbroken and nearly suicidal. When he gets home, he sees that Jenny Humphrey has arrived looking for Nate. The two drunkenly sleep together, heartbroken that their true loves don't return their feelings.

Blair appears later in Chuck's suite, apologizing for being late, and the two reunite (sleep together). Chuck is about to propose to Blair at the hospital, as they visit Dorota and her new baby, when Dan appears and rashly delivers a punch to Chuck's face. He then forces Chuck to tell Blair what happened between him and Jenny. Blair breaks things off with Chuck and informs him that it's over for good. She also threatens to ruin Jenny's life if she doesn't leave Manhattan immediately. Chuck then travels to Prague to escape New York for a while, feeling as though he has nothing left. He gets robbed by two muggers who insist on taking the ring that Chuck intended on proposing to Blair with and when Chuck puts up a fight, he gets shot. The last shot of season 3 is him lying in an alley, presumably dying.

=== Season 4 ===
In the first episode of season four, we find that Chuck is alive and well, having been rescued by Czech girl, Eva (Clémence Poésy) who has no idea of his wealth or who he is. He creates a fake name and persona as he no longer wants to be the manipulative Chuck Bass. He eventually reveals who he really is and returns to New York City with her, at the request of Blair and Serena. Blair insists she no longer loves him, but still schemes to undermine his new relationship. He eventually falls for one of her schemes and breaks up with Eva. He realizes his mistake and begs her to take him back, but she refuses, saying that he showed his true feelings by continuing to believe Blair over anyone else.

Chuck asks Blair whether she still has feelings for him, and she denies it, prompting him to declare "war" on her. He tries to "take" Columbia from her, and arranges for Jenny Humphrey to return to the city in order to stir up trouble for Blair, who still hasn't told her minions why she banished Jenny from the Upper East Side in the first place. After Jenny declares that it's only a matter of time before they both destroy each other, Chuck and Blair agree to a truce. They even draw up a contract, with the stipulation "no touching," but their mutual attraction proves too powerful and they soon fall into an enemies-with-benefits relationship.

In "The Witches of Bushwick", Chuck accidentally tells Blair during foreplay that he loves her and, not knowing whether his words are true, Blair chooses to gloss over the moment. Although Chuck and Blair spend the episode striving for different ends which will eventually alienate each other (Blair to become the face of Anne Archibald's charity, Girls Inc, and Chuck to increase the revenue of The Empire by returning to his bad boy persona), Blair makes the decision to attend Chuck's Saints and Sinners party in order to confront him. Chuck confesses that he loves her, and the pair kiss in front of everyone after the curtain concealing them is pulled down. Anne tells Blair that she can no longer be a part of Girls Inc just as Chuck's publicist KC tells Chuck that she thinks Blair will be good for business. Blair re-thinks her decision to sacrifice it all for their relationship, and she and Chuck break up once again. Chuck promises he'll wait for her, and both affirm their belief that their love will reunite them in the end.

On Thanksgiving Chuck and Blair run into each other at Serena's house, Chuck offers to leave but she tells him that she was heading to JFK anyway and came to drop off the traditional pie and that they should get used to this. They hear about Serena being hospitalized and while they're sharing that maybe nothing can change between them, Jenny walks in and interrupts their conversation. While driving Blair home, Chuck tells her that he showed up only for Serena. When she told him that what happened with Serena made her question what she told him after the Saints & Sinners party; Chuck tells her that he cannot be her friend now as much as he wishes he could. After that Blair still sends him her traditional pie, saying that even if they can't be friends it doesn't mean that they aren't.

In "The Townie" episode, It was revealed that Lily was going to sell Bass Industries instead of giving Chuck the company back. So he sets off to New Zealand, where his uncle Jack Bass is currently living. In the following episodes Chuck returns to the Upper East Side with revenge for Lily. Chuck's new love interest is Raina and her father is Russell Thorpe, a former rival of Chuck's late father Bart Bass. Russell is the main contender to buy Bass industries. Chuck, however, manages to save the company after it is revealed that Russell accidentally killed his wife in a building fire that Bart was originally accused of.

In "The Princess and the Frog" he learns that Blair's relationship with Louis is serious, and that there is talk about them getting engaged. He gets drunk and embarrasses Blair in front of Louis' mother, and later tries to force himself on her, while pushing her down and smashing a glass window right next to her face, after she tells him about her engagement. Blair ends up with her cheek being cut.

Later, Blair is kidnapped by Russell, but Chuck saves her, and the two go to a Bar Mitzah. There, the two are seen dancing and smiling happily. Blair pulls him off the dance floor into a private room and the two have sex. Blair decides she is going to leave Louis, but Chuck stops her, telling her that she needs to be with Louis because he makes her happy. At the end of the episode, Chuck decides to spend the summer traveling with Nate.

==== Controversy ====
Following the 20th episode of Season 4, Safran spoke on behalf of the series regarding the scene in which Chuck became violent with Blair.

The way we viewed it, I think it's very clear that Blair is not afraid in those moments, for herself. They have a volatile relationship, they always have, but I do not believe—or I should say we do not believe—that it is abuse when it's the two of them. Chuck does not try to hurt Blair. He punches the glass because he has rage, but he has never, and will never, hurt Blair. He knows it and she knows it, and I feel it's very important to know that she is not scared—if anything, she is scared for Chuck—and what he might do to himself, but she is never afraid of what he might do to her. Leighton and I were very clear about that.

=== Season 5 ===
In the first episode of season 5, we find out that Chuck has spent his summer traveling the world with Nate. The two arrive in Los Angeles to meet up with Serena, who is working as an assistant on a film set. Seemingly over his break up with Blair, Chuck exhibits a positive outlook on life, telling Serena and Nate that he's seeking to experience everything he can in life. However, his heartbreak soon becomes apparent when he receives an invitation to Blair's upcoming wedding, which causes him to drive recklessly and get into a motorbike accident. In the following episode, it is revealed that Chuck has an emotional disorder as a result of his losing Blair, and which now causes him to be numb to physical and emotional stimuli. Dan decides to help Chuck break through this emotional barrier, and gets him a dog, hoping to spark some emotion. However, it is only when Blair reveals to him that she is pregnant with Louis's baby does Chuck begin feel again – he is shown crying over the revelation at the end of the episode. He names the dog "Monkey" (a homage to the pet monkey Chuck's character had in the books). He forms a reluctant friendship with Dan from here on.

He meets a psychiatrist, Eliza Barnes, who tells him that he acts out because he never had a childhood, and needs help. When he finds himself falling back into his old patterns, he calls Dr. Barnes, ready to seek that help. However, it is revealed that Blair's fiancé, Louis, gives Dr. Barnes money to upset Chuck, in hopes that he will do something reckless and drive Blair away forever. When Chuck finds this out, he publicly exposes both Dr. Barnes and Louis, leaving Blair devastated. Later that same night, he goes to Blair's apartment to finally apologize to her for all the times he's hurt her and let her down. His apology recounts all the obstacles Chuck and Blair have faced in their relationship thus far, and prompts an emotional Blair to thank him. Chuck assures her that she is going to be "an amazing mother", having come to terms with her relationship with Louis.

He resolves to keep his distance from her after that, but in "The Big Sleep No More", a conflicted Blair seduces him in the hope to prove that his efforts to be a better man is just a ploy to win her back. When he kisses her, she slaps him, and tells him that he will never change. It is later revealed that he conspired with Dorota and kissed Blair in order to confirm her suspicions of him, and push her back to Louis. In the episode "Riding in Town Cars with Boys" he admits to Blair that he still loves her. They profess their love for one another in Chuck's limo. This occurs whilst the limo is being chased by paparazzi on motorbikes and results in a car crash. Lily reveals at the conclusion of the episode that Blair is awake and doing fine, but whether or not Chuck has survived was not revealed.

We later discover that Chuck did indeed survive the accident after a blood transfusion was donated to him. He wakes up to a very distant Blair, very opposite to the one he got into an accident with. For the next few episodes he chases her to discover what has changed her mind – unbeknownst to him, Blair has made a pact with God over his life, where if she breaks her promise to Louis, Chuck will surely die. This leads to Blair going to Chuck's penthouse in the episode "The End of the Affair" where she tells him what a good man he has become and to not let the ending of their relationship destroy him.

In G.G., Chuck is willing to accept the fact that Blair is marrying another man, when Blair's mother tries to convince him to stop the wedding. He makes one final play for Blair, but Blair – despite saying that she "loves him more and more every day, if it's even possible to love somebody that much" – once more rebuffs him, saying that she's actually doing this for him. Their conversation is unknowingly recorded, and released in a blast by Gossip Girl during the wedding. Despite this, Blair still marries Louis, but flees the reception with Dan when Louis reveals that their relationship is now strictly business.

With the help of Dan, Blair tries to leave for the Dominican Republic to get a divorce from Louis without his consent due to a loophole in the Dominican Republic's law, but forgets her passport. Chuck, Nate and Serena eventually find Blair hiding out in a hotel room with Dan. However, Sophia finds Blair and threatens to forcefully sell Eleanor's company as dowry if Blair chooses not to return. Blair reluctantly goes back to Louis, despite an offer from Chuck to pay her dowry.

In "Cross Rhodes", Blair realizes she now has feelings for Dan, and Chuck and Serena struggle with watching their loves with their friends.

In "The Princess Dowry", Chuck pays Blair's dowry so she can be free, but wishes for it to remain a secret. She finds out and accuses him of wanting to own her. He admits that he paid the dowry, but for her freedom and her freedom only. At the end of the episode, Blair begins a relationship with Dan.

In "Con Heir", Chuck invites his uncle, Jack, back to New York to thank him for saving his life in the car accident by donating blood, but starts to doubt Jack's story when Chuck investigates and learns that Jack was recently diagnosed positive with Hepatitis C, and a test on Chuck turns to be negative. This kicks off a lot of "mother/father" issues for Chuck – he believes that it was Elizabeth Fisher who donated the blood, then Diana says that she is his mother when Bart cheated on Elizabeth with her (she claims that an arrangement was made with Diana leaving town alone, leaving Chuck to be raised by Bart and Elizabeth because Elizabeth couldn't get pregnant), but in "Despicable B", Nate receives a picture from Elizabeth that indeed shows her pregnant with Chuck. Chuck is more interested in the man in the picture with Elizabeth – his face is cut out, but his tattooed arm is still visible. Jack Bass has exactly the same tattoo.

It all comes to a head in "Raiders of the Lost Art", when he, Blair, Serena, Nate and Lola team together to crack the code in Diana's day planner – the code they believe will lead them to Jack Bass. They end up at a brothel that Diana is in charge of. Diana realizes that they are there and has the event shut down. During the chaos, Blair searches one of the rooms, still looking for Jack, and is shocked by what she sees. Blair later tells Chuck to re-enter the building once everyone is gone, which he does, and it is revealed that Bart Bass is still alive.

Bart reveals that he faked his death to save Chuck and Lily, and has been hiding from everyone for the past three years. The car crash actually happened, and that it was ordered by one of Bart's enemies. When he was in the hospital, he paid the doctor to say he died and then recruited Diana Payne to help him hide. Diana kept Bart informed of when Chuck was in trouble, so when Chuck was in the hospital, Bart was the one who donated his blood to save Chuck.

In "The Return of the Ring", Bart drops the bombshell that he will be returning to Bass Industries as "the only Bass in Bass Industries", pushing Chuck out of the company. After this, Blair declares her love for Chuck, admitting she finally really wants them to be together. Chuck rejects her in anger, shadowing the words she once said to him: "I don't want to be Mr. Blair Waldorf."

Chuck pairs up with an unlikely partner – Jack – to take down his father. They meet in a casino in Monte Carlo. Blair turns up, informed by Jack of Chuck's whereabouts. Blair reveals she is 'all in' and one hundred per cent ready to be with him.

=== Season 6 ===
At the beginning of the season Chuck and Blair make a pact not to be together until Blair succeeds at Waldorf Designs and Chuck takes down Bart. After many failed attempts of taking down Bart, Bart and Chuck end up in a fight. This leads to Bart falling off a building and dying. Blair is the only witness to this event and so Chuck and Blair get married so Blair does not have to testify against Chuck.

In the 5-year flash forward, Chuck and Blair are happily married with a son (Henry). They are all gathered at the Bass house for Dan and Serena's wedding.

== Characterization ==
Ed Westwick who portrays the character on the television series said: "As the [first] season's progressed, I think everyone's had sympathy for him. I think he's an alluring character; he's very interesting. He has these slices of his personality. He can be the devil, but at times he can be very charming. It can be a very dangerous concoction. I think he has a good heart, but his heart is often tempted by corrupt desires." He later added: "He's intelligent and quite slimy in the way he manipulates to his gain. He goes after what he wants. Sometimes that's not a good thing. He's got a long way to go before he's a nice guy." Westwick also said: "Chuck's just this vain kind of metrosexual Manhattan eccentric living in a flash world." While describing Chuck as "mischievous", Westwick noted the second season displayed a "more good-guy" side of him. Ultimately, he said Chuck is a "kid trying to find his way in the world."

Denise Martin of the Los Angeles Times characterizes him as more of "a would-be Casanova than a seasoned predator. He's the charming devil at the center of all the intrigues, the go-to guy when something naughty needs to be said and he's the most self-aware of the Upper East Side high schoolers.

Stephanie Savage, one of the television series' creators, described him as "entertaining and observationally smart, he's the friend who says all the things you want to say but can't, and he tempts you in ways, at that age, you want to be tempted." She compared his relationship with Blair to Glenn Close and John Malkovich's in Dangerous Liaisons. She found Westwick's portrayal of Chuck was similar to James Spader of Pretty in Pink and Robert Downey Jr.

Savage said about the character's evolution during the six seasons: "I feel like Chuck has gone on the biggest journey of any one on the show. In the pilot, he's pretty much a pure villain. He's not a character that has a lot of layers. That was something Ed Westwick really brought as an actor. And his chemistry with Leighton [Meester] — when we saw them together on screen and the power of the two of them working together but also being attracted to each other, which really inspired us to grow that character and give him some more layers."

== Reception ==
Entertainment Weekly named Chuck Bass and Blair Waldorf number one in their "Best Dressed TV characters of 2008" list, as well as in their "Best Performances" list for Ed Westwick, alongside co-star Leighton Meester. His relationship with Blair was included in TV Guide's list of "The Best TV Couples of All Time" as well as Entertainment Weekly's "30 Best 'Will They/Won't They?' TV Couples". The character also made the "Forbes Fictional 15" ranking at number 13 with an estimated $1.1 billion fortune.

In February 2012, Zap2it held a poll to determine TV's Most Crushworthy. Chuck was elected TV's Most Crushworthy 1% Male over Oliver Queen of Smallville. The 1 percenters are people that "have everything going for them with their fantastic good looks and their opulent lifestyle".

In May 2025, Lancôme revived Chuck Bass for the campaign "Juicy Tubes Kissing Web" and according to The Business of Fashion "Lancôme says Westwick’s video is the most-engaged social media content they’ve ever made." The campaign celebrates 25 years of their lip gloss.
