= Blair Waldorf =

Fictional character in Gossip Girl

- Gossip Girl character
- Blair as portrayed on the cover of It Had to Be You
- First appearance: Novel: Gossip Girl; Television: "Pilot" (episode 1.01)
- Last appearance: Novel: I Will Always Love You; Television: "New York, I Love You XOXO" (episode 6.10)
- Created by: Character; Cecily von Ziegesar; Television producers Josh Schwartz; Stephanie Savage
- Portrayed by: Leighton Meester

In-universe information
- Full name: Novel: Blair Cornelia Waldorf Television: Blair Cornelia Waldorf Bass
- Aliases: Novel: B Blair Bear (by her father); Bear (by her father) Television: B Queen B
- Titles: Television: Princess Blair of Monaco (during her marriage to Louis)
- Occupation: Novel: Intern at the Litigation firm MacMahon Cannon (currently); Yale University Law School Student (currently); Yale University Student in political sciences and pre-law (graduated); Intern on the campaign of a Connecticut Senator (formerly); Saint Peter's College in Oxford University exchange program Student (formerly); Constance Billard School for girls student (graduated); Television: CEO of Eleanor Waldorf Designs fashion firm Columbia University Student; Intern at the W fashion magazine New York University Student; Constance Billard School for girls student (graduated)
- Family: Novel: Harold and Eleanor Waldorf (parents); Tyler Waldorf (brother); Yale Rose (maternal half sister); Pierre Waldorf (adoptive paternal half brother); Pauline Waldorf (adoptive paternal half sister); Tyler August Waldorf (maternal grandfather); Mirabel Waldorf (maternal grandmother); Fran Waldorf (maternal aunt); Zo Zo Waldorf (maternal aunt); Catherine Waldorf (maternal aunt); Peter (maternal cousin); Willie (maternal cousin); Becky (maternal cousin); Kitty Minky (cat; pet); Cyrus Rose (stepfather); Aaron Rose (stepbrother); Giles (stepfather via her father); Bruce (uncle-in-law); Ray (uncle-in-law); Television: Harold and Eleanor Waldorf (parents); Cyrus Rose (stepfather); Bartholomew Bass (father-in-law); Lily Van Der Woodsen (step/adoptive mother-in-law); Elizabeth Fisher (mother-in-law); Serena Van der Woodsen (step/adoptive sister-in-law); Eric Van der Woodsen (step/adoptive brother-in-law); Aaron Rose (stepbrother)
- Spouses: Television: Charles "Chuck" Bass (husband); Prince Louis Grimaldi (ex-husband)
- Children: Television: Henry Bass (son, with Chuck; flash-forward)
- Alma mater: Novels: Yale University; University of Oxford; Television: New York University; Columbia University

Blair Cornelia Waldorf (married name Bass) is one of the main characters of Gossip Girl, introduced in the original series of novels and also appearing as the lead in the television adaptation; she also appears in the comic adaptation. Described as "a girl of extremes" by creator Cecily von Ziegesar, she is a New York City socialite and a comical overachiever who possesses both snobbish and sensitive sides. Due to her position as queen bee of Manhattan's social scene, Blair's actions and relations are under constant scrutiny from the mysterious Gossip Girl, a popular blogger.

Leighton Meester, who portrayed the character in the television drama, has described Blair as being insecure about her social status. At times, this anxiety creates flaws and complexities which contribute to character development. In Meester's view, the true Blair is ultimately a good girl at heart.

Blair has been compared to vintage film and literary figures, including Becky Sharp and Lizzie Eustace. She is commonly likened to Lila Fowler of Francine Pascal's Sweet Valley High series. Meester's portrayal has also drawn comparisons to roles played by Joan Collins and Audrey Hepburn. She is the most critically acclaimed character of the franchise, while the television character has drawn real-life attention surrounding fashion and her love life.

== Character in print ==
Gossip Girl is a series of novels about socially prominent young adults in New York City. The story primarily follows Blair Waldorf and her best friend Serena van der Woodsen during their years in high school and college. Due to her fame on the Upper East Side, Blair is featured on the website of "Gossip Girl", an anonymous gossip blogger whose posts appear occasionally throughout the story.

=== Novel series ===
In the first book, Blair is introduced as a privileged, comically vain overachiever. She is described as an alluring brunette, and occasionally models her appearance and demeanor after famous actresses, including Marilyn Monroe and, most often, Audrey Hepburn. In early novels, the character is also written as bulimic.

Blair is largely motivated by matters surrounding family, romance, and ambition. However, her tendency to overachieve can lead to feelings of paranoia, with dramatic or comical results. In a review for The New Yorker, Janet Malcolm remarked that Blair's issues made her "both a broader caricature and a more real person" than the other Gossip Girl characters. In a 2009 interview, Gossip Girl creator Cecily von Ziegesar claimed to identify with Blair the most, stating, "She is so unpredictable and dramatic. Such a bitch, but we understand why she is a bitch and we like her anyway".

In the novel series, Blair Cornelia Waldorf is a pretty, perfectionist, hard-working young woman with a compulsive personality and eating disorders. Ambitious and determined, she is willing to do anything to succeed and refuses to back down from any obstacle life places in her path. However, being very impulsive, she often acts out of anger or sorrow, leading her to commit numerous rash actions that she must then undo.

Blair cares little about what others think of her; she speaks freely and is less concerned with her impact on others. She is fiercely competitive and authoritarian, becoming irritable when those around her fail to behave as she expects. She uses her charm, money and social clout to get what she wants, as she was raised to believe that she deserves everything she desires. However, she at times shows great empathy, especially toward those younger than herself. She is romantic and idealistic by nature, and frequently imagines her life as a fairy tale. Blair is considered one of the most popular girls on the Upper East Side and has her own entourage.

She is described as a fashion enthusiast who always wears the best shoes and clothes in the series and, being very athletic, is also tremendously talented at tennis, a discipline in which she is highly ranked at the national level. Blair is the eldest daughter of the extremely wealthy Harold J. Waldorf III, a renowned business attorney, and Eleanor Wheaton Waldorf, a Scottish protestant socialite— and has a younger brother, Tyler Hugh Waldorf, six years her junior. Her pet is a small Russian Blue cat named Kitty Minky.

Blair's parents divorce when her father was caught cheating on her mother with his 21-year-old secretary. His homosexuality being finally revealed, Harold decides to flee the scandal by settling permanently in the south of France with his young lover. After this painful separation, Eleanor meets Cyrus Rose, a Jewish real estate developer, and marries him shortly after. Blair thus acquires an anarchist, pacifist, vegan stepbrother, Aaron Rose, whom she initially cannot stand but who eventually earns her respect. This new union also brings the birth of Blair, Tyler and Aaron’s half-sister, little Yale Rose, named by Blair in tribute to her dream university. At the beginning of the saga, Blair is a student at Constance Billard School for Girls, where she is the top student in her class, and her entire life revolves around her obsession with getting into Yale alongside her boyfriend, Nathaniel “Nate” Archibald - with whom she constantly breaks up and reconciles — and finally turning their relationship into a shared life, perhaps even a marriage. In the early part of the book series, she is also fixated on the idea of losing her virginity to him.

Blair idolizes actress Audrey Hepburn so intensely that she tries to live her life the way she imagines her idol would. She often turns various adventures into scenarios she plays out as though she were starring in the movie of her own life. Although beautiful and more than wealthy, Blair is constantly plagued by doubts and her life is far less perfect than she wishes.

Despite her excellent academic performance and numerous extracurricular activities (tennis, working in a soup kitchen one night a week, tutoring third graders in reading, taking fashion design course with Oscar de la Renta, chairing the Social Services Board, running the French Club, participating on the planning committee of every social function, doing charity work, presiding several youth organizations, etc.), she sees her college applications inexplicably rejected by most of the universities she applies to during her senior year, except for Georgetown, which immediately accepts her, and Yale, which at first places her — much to her dismay — on its waiting list.

Just as she is about to begin her higher education, her father — who has since remarried to a man named Giles — adopts two young Cambodian twins, Pierre and Pauline Waldorf (previously named Ping and Pong), thereby presenting Blair —desperate at the thought of no longer being the center of family attention — with two additional (half-)siblings.

After high school, Blair finally enters her dream university, Yale, where she studies political science for four years, hoping eventually to be admitted to law school. During her studies, her ambition even leads her to work on the campaign of a Connecticut senator. She also spent her junior year studying in England, at Saint Peter's College in the Oxford University where she crossed path again with Chuck and started a 12 months romance with him. Finally, in the fourth and final year of her undergraduate degree, she secures an internship at a prestigious New York litigation firm, MacMahon Cannon.

Blair has Serena Van der Woodsen as her childhood best friend and, though she loves her with all her heart, spends much of her time envying her. During her senior year, she also becomes the temporary roommate and friend of Vanessa Abrams and serves as a sort of mentor to Jenny Humphrey and Elise Wells.

Blair Cornelia Waldorf is described as average height (5'5"), slim and toned. She has long, dark chestnut, walnut-colored hair, cobalt-blue eyes, red lips, an aristocratic chin and a small fox-like face with delicate features. Her chest fills a B cup and she has a well-proportioned figure. She chopped her hair into a pixie cut in Because I'm Worth It, before having it extended in Don't You Forget About Me.

==== Storylines ====
Throughout most of the series' run, Blair grapples with a number of changes within her family. One year prior to the opening novel, Blair's parents divorced after her father ran off with another man. When her mother remarries, and her father leaves the country, Blair has difficulty accepting her stepfather, Cyrus Rose. In addition, her stress over these matters occasionally affects her other relationships. However, Blair ultimately remains close to her father Harold, who she often turns to for comfort. By contrast, she maintains a somewhat tenser relationship with her mother Eleanor. It is also revealed that Blair has struggled with bulimia.

In the opening novel, Blair learns of an affair between her friend Serena van der Woodsen and her boyfriend Nate. This marks the beginning of the story's primary love triangle, which recurs throughout the series. Blair's romantic life has various effects on her character development. After Nate repeatedly hurts her, she eventually refuses to take him back until she believes in his ability to commit to her. In pursuing Nate, however, Blair herself cheats on her new boyfriend Pete, which results in her losing both of them. She eventually begins to acknowledge her mistakes, with her father's help. She later grows closer to Chuck Bass (which initially occurred in the series' television adaptation), who she'd previously known for years, which leads them to briefly date one another.

Blair is noted for an over-achieving nature, which often appears in humorous scenes. In a review for New York magazine, Emily Nussbaum lauded one of Blair's fantasies, which involves "joining the Peace Corps, getting a killer tan, winning the Nobel Peace Prize, and having dinner with the president, 'who would then write her a recommendation to Yale, and then Yale would fall all over themselves to accept her.' " The New Yorker's Janet Malcolm remarked that unlike some of her forerunners in film and literature, "Blair already has all the money and position anyone could want. She is pure naked striving, restlessly seeking an object, any object, and never knowing when enough is enough."

Blair encounters a setback during her interview at Yale by revealing the recent stress in her life, and then kissing her interviewer on the cheek upon dismissal. Her father then makes a donation to the school, though Blair is still wait-listed. In the twelfth book, I Will Always Love You, it is revealed that she has been admitted to the university.

In addition to her feelings for Nate, Blair is sometimes said to feel competitive with Serena in other areas, including matters of beauty and popularity. This also leads to an occasional envy on Blair's part. It is unclear how much of Blair's perception of Serena is in line with reality; the narrative describes both characters as "hands down the two hottest girls on the Upper East Side, and maybe all of Manhattan, or even the whole world."

=== Manga series ===
Blair as she appears in the manga

In 2010, Yen Press began publishing a manga adaptation titled Gossip Girl: For Your Eyes Only, written and illustrated by HyeKyung Baek. This series adapts notable scenarios from the novel—including the triangle with Nate and Serena—but also features new material.

After losing her position as queen bee, Blair attempts to regain her former status while adjusting to a less privileged lifestyle. In addition to this series, Blair also appears in a manga adaptation of the novel Gossip Girl: Psycho Killer, a parody of horror stories.

== Television series ==
In 2007, Gossip Girl was adapted for television. According to Cecily von Ziegesar, the television character is largely faithful to the original. Among the aspects to be maintained are her admiration for Audrey Hepburn and her interest in Yale University. However, the series is also noted for its deviations from the source material, including the exclusion of Blair's brother Tyler. The show also explores romances between Blair and multiple male leads, resulting in occasional love triangles. In the fifth season, Blair is revealed to be pregnant with Prince of Monaco, Louis Grimaldi's child. However the child later dies before birth after a car crash Blair and Chuck were in.

Among fans and the media, Blair's bond with Chuck Bass was commonly known by the portmanteau "Chair", while her relationship with Dan Humphrey was referred to as "Dair". The nicknames and viewer interest in these relationships were recognized by the show's producers.

=== Casting ===
They were like, 'Be bitchy and nice, ugly and pretty, young and old, stupid and smart, innocent and slutty, blond and brunette. Can you be all those things?'

— Leighton Meester

To prepare for the part of Blair, actress Leighton Meester, a natural blonde, dyed her hair brown before auditioning, and also studied the first novel. She has described the character as multi-faceted, labeling her "a little bit of everything which is pretty amazing." Like von Ziegesar, Meester has also claimed to relate to Blair on certain levels. Prior to the show's debut in 2007, the actress stated that, "The only way to play Blair, or any character, and make her human, is to find what she is inside me. And I know I have my insecurities, too." She went on to say that, "The way Blair and I are not alike when it comes to insecurities is: She pays so much attention to hers!" Meester's casting was described by Yahoo! as a star-making role which moved her "into the pop culture vanguard", while Cecily von Ziegesar has called her a perfect choice.

In December 2010, Meester revealed plans to leave the show in 2012. E! Online and other outlets speculated that her departure would possibly mark the end of the series.

=== Season 1 ===
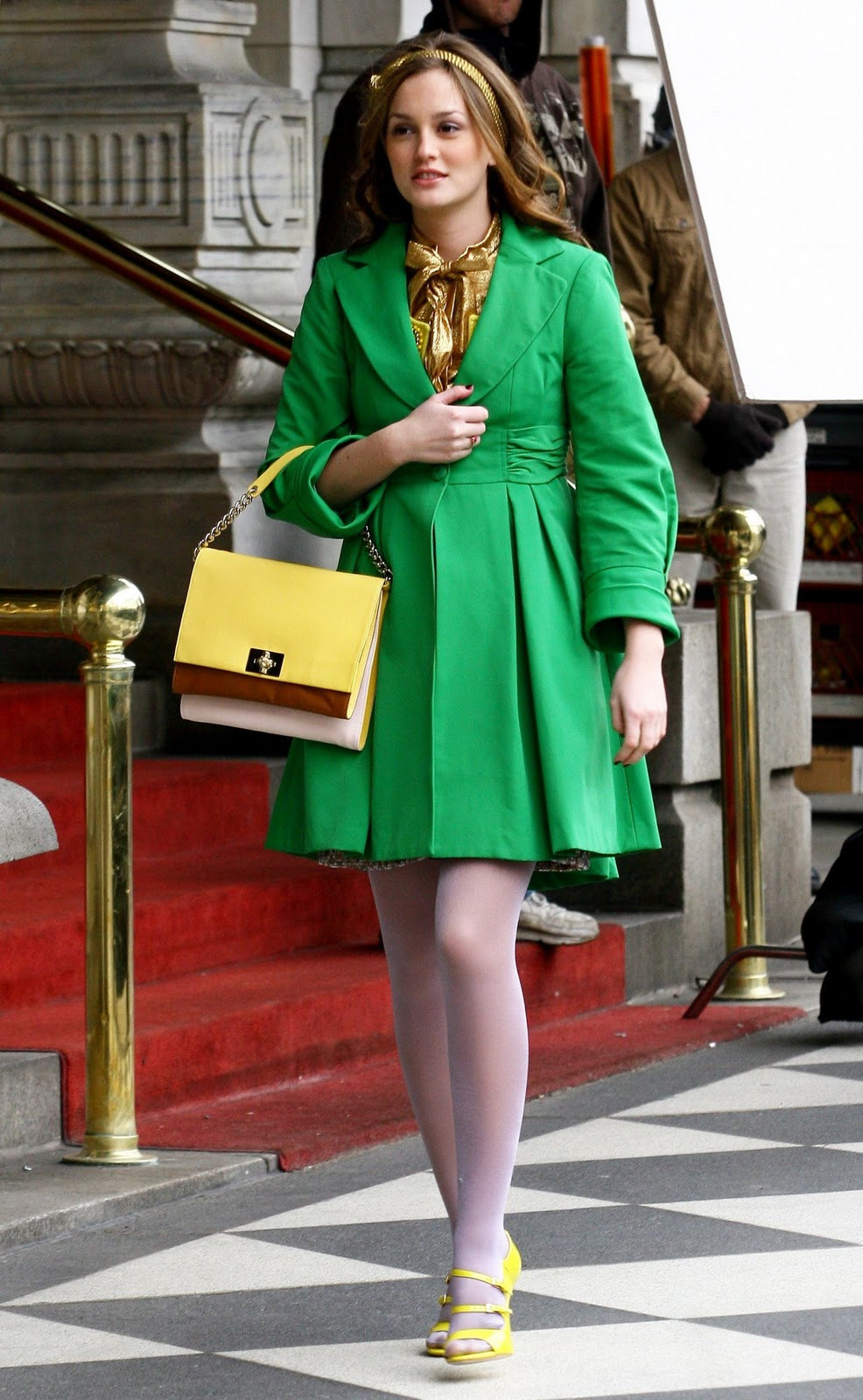
Blair as she appears in the TV adaptation, portrayed by Leighton Meester

In Season 1 of Gossip Girl, Blair is introduced as the Upper East Side's beautiful and popular queen bee. She is the daughter of Eleanor Waldorf, a famous fashion designer. She is dating Nate Archibald, and is best friends with Serena van der Woodsen. She also finds a close companion in Nate's best friend and her childhood friend Chuck Bass, who becomes a partner for her schemes. When Serena returns home from boarding school, Blair learns from Nate that he lost his virginity to a drunken Serena over a year ago. Blair retaliates by publicly revealing Serena's connection to a rehab hospital. She then learns that the actual patient is Serena's younger brother, Eric, who had been committed after a suicide attempt. Afterward, a remorseful Blair reconciles with Serena.

After learning that Nate no longer loves her, Blair sleeps with Chuck, eventually falling for him. This leads to a heated affair and an eventual love triangle. Her inability to choose creates much of the first season's story line. There are brief mentions of Blair's past struggle with bulimia.

She also begins a brief power struggle with freshman Jenny Humphrey. After she unites with Chuck and Nate in order to save Serena from the scheming Georgina Sparks, Chuck realizes that his feelings for Blair are real and suggests that they spend the summer together in Tuscany. However, he is discouraged by his father at the last minute, and stands Blair up.

=== Season 2 ===
At the launch of the second season, Blair was described by creators as the queen at the center of the Gossip Girl chess game. A large portion of her story line in Season 2 revolves around her love-hate relationship with Chuck Bass, which was labeled "the heart of GG" by People magazine. While competing with Serena, Blair forms an unexpected friendship with Jenny, who states that they each work for everything they achieve, while Serena often glides through life. During their interviews at Yale University, Blair and Serena apologize for their ill feelings and resume their friendship.

In the episode "O Brother, Where Bart Thou?", Chuck is devastated by news of his father's death, prompting Blair to offer her support while telling Chuck that she loves him. He initially shuns her advances, but later turns to her for comfort. However, the two stop seeing each other due to Chuck's uncle, Jack Bass, convincing him he has an inability to commit to a relationship. After being rejected by Yale, Blair finds unexpected encouragement from Nate. She is later accepted into New York University, and her competitive relationship with Georgina is eventually renewed.

As the season ends, Blair crowns Jenny the new queen of Constance Billard School. In the season finale, it is discovered that Blair slept with Chuck's uncle Jack and that Chuck had slept with Vanessa Abrams. Chuck then departs for Europe. He later returns to New York and reconciles with Blair while declaring his love for her, and the two finally begin a committed relationship.

=== Season 3 ===
In the third season, Blair joins Vanessa, Georgina, and Jenny's brother Dan at NYU. Much of her storyline concerns her inability to attain her previous status at her new school. She finds emotional support from her mother, as well as Chuck. However, she and Chuck separate once again when Blair feels that he manipulated her while competing with his uncle (Chuck made a deal with Jack that Blair could sleep with him and in exchange, Chuck gets his hotel back that Jack initially stole to 'destroy Chuck').

She later transfers to Columbia University, and learns that an emotionally reformed Chuck was responsible for her enrollment. They later team up as part of a role-playing scheme to help Serena's mother and Chuck's adopted mother, Lily. In the season finale, Chuck attempts to propose to Blair, but is interrupted by Dan, who reveals that Chuck had slept with Jenny. Two weeks later, Blair and Serena depart for Paris intending to spend the summer together.

=== Season 4 ===
In Season 4, Blair and Chuck become competitive once again, but eventually resume their sexual relations before recognizing their love for one another. When the relationship interferes with their business interests, she and Chuck break up once more. Chuck promises he'll wait for her, and both affirm their belief that their love will reunite them in the end.

Blair then teams up with Dan when the two share common goals. They also end up working together at W. magazine, where friction develops between the two. On Valentine's Day, she discovers that Chuck has romantic feelings for Raina Thorpe, the daughter of his business rival. Later, she and Dan spend the evening talking on their cell phones while watching Rosemary's Baby. Blair later quits W. and is shown asleep with Dan in his Brooklyn flat. Later, upon growing curious of their feelings for one another, Blair and Dan share a kiss before the mid-season hiatus.

Blair eventually decides that she wants to be with Chuck, but shuns him once again after he tries to humiliate Dan. She is later courted by a prince from Monaco named Louis. During a private confrontation, a drunken Chuck punches a window after he finds out Prince Louis has proposed to Blair, which cuts Blair's face as it shatters. Afterward, Blair chooses to accept a proposal from Louis. Blair later attempts to warn Chuck about potential trouble in his family. She is then abducted by an enemy of the Basses, Raina's father Russell Thorpe. Chuck later rescues Blair and apologizes for his violent actions. Following a night out together, the two have sex before Chuck advises Blair to return to Louis, believing that she will be happier with him. However, the season ends with the revelation that Blair may be pregnant.

==== Reaction to triangle ====
Chuck and Blair are always going to be connected in their way, and Dan and Serena are always going to be connected in their way. But that doesn't mean that there won't be new roads to go down that might be different than what we initially anticipated.

—Joshua Safran, producer

Amidst the fourth season, the romance between Dan and Blair became a polarizing topic among viewers which also drew significant media interest. Jarett Wieselman of the New York Post applauded the development, feeling that Blair had "more chemistry" with Dan than with Chuck. Tierney Bricker of E! ranked all 25 Gossip Girl couples placing 'Dair' as the third best couple after Blair and Serena (#1) and 'Chair' (#2).

Dawn Fallik of The Wall Street Journal was less positive, asserting that "both characters have been so Blandified that there's no fun left in the show." A writer for E! Online's Team WWK labeled the Dan/Blair relationship "nomance nonsense".

With regard to Chuck and Blair, Meester stated, "I can really relate to it—not necessarily because it's this dramatic, tumultuous relationship, but because the way they love each other is very real, and not for the sake of being dramatic. It's actual love. There's nobody for each other but them." Meester also expressed fondness for Dan and Blair, however, stating, "I think they're good for each other in a lot of ways, in a way that Chuck and Blair aren't." Badgley claimed that he thought "Blair [was] Dan's soul mate" but that Blair's soulmate was Chuck "because Blair and Chuck belong with each other, obviously." He further stated that he thought the Blair and Dan storyline was "the most exciting for Dan as a person".

According to producer Joshua Safran, the outcome wasn't necessarily decided ahead of time. "One thing we are very conscious of—and I know some fans get upset about this—is we really try to treat the characters as living, breathing, well-rounded individuals. And we're often surprised by where their journeys take them; they open new doors for us all the time," he said.

==== Controversy ====
Following the twentieth episode of Season 4, Safran spoke on Chuck's violence around Blair in the episode:

The way we viewed [the violence], I think it's very clear that Blair is not afraid in those moments. [She and Chuck] have a volatile relationship but I do not believe it is abuse [because] Chuck has never, and will never, hurt Blair. He knows it and she knows it, and I feel it's very important to know that she is not scared—if anything, she is scared for Chuck—and what he might do to himself, but she is never afraid of what he might do to her.

In response to these comments, Carina MacKenzie of Zap2it stated, "We're left wondering if Safran missed the part where she went home bleeding because Chuck was using physical intimidation to release his own emotions." While reviewing the episode, Tierney Bricker of Zap2it felt that there were "really no excuses for Chuck Bass anymore." MacKenzie also called the show's explanation "disturbing, particularly given the young, female target demographic of Gossip Girl and The CW."

In a review for the Los Angeles Times, Judy Berman addressed Safran's description of Blair during the scene. "Considering how terrified Blair looked at the end of their encounter, and how quickly she got out of there, the show is sending a mixed message at best." She went on to state, "We have no right to expect Gossip Girl to be a paragon of morality, or even realism, but the idea that true love requires taking a shard of glass to the face is disturbing even in this alternate, soap-opera dimension."

=== Season 5 ===
In the fifth-season premiere, Blair continues to plan her wedding, but begins to encounter problems in her relationship with Louis. It is later revealed that she is pregnant. Blair tells Chuck that the child is Louis', and states that part of her wanted Chuck to be the father. Dan becomes Blair's confidante and is shown to be in love with her, though she remains oblivious to his feelings and states that there is nothing more than friendship between them.

Though she insists that she is in love with Louis, Blair begins to seek Chuck out as the season progresses. The two eventually declare their love for each other prior to a car accident in her limousine while being chased by paparazzi. Though both recover, Blair suffers a miscarriage from the crash. After the crash Blair decides that she must commit herself to Louis, converting to Catholicism and cutting off any connection with Chuck. At the wedding, Gossip Girl releases a recording of Blair confessing her love for Chuck. Nevertheless, Louis and Blair get married, making Blair a Princess of Monaco, though Louis informs her that they will have a loveless marriage of convenience. She then receives support from Dan, leading them to share a kiss on Valentine's Day. Amidst these developments, Blair grows conflicted between her feelings for Dan and Chuck. After taking steps to end her marriage, she chooses to pursue a relationship with Dan. By the end of the season, however, after a debate about which love is the best, Blair declares that she is still in love with Chuck, and chooses to pursue him.

=== Season 6 ===
In the final season, Blair resumes her romantic relationship with Chuck, while Chuck and his father Bart—who is revealed to be alive in the previous season—become bitter rivals. Blair pursues her career as head of Waldorf Designs, with several mishaps, before staging a successful line. In the penultimate episode, Bart falls to his death while trying to attack Chuck atop a building. Afterward, Blair and Chuck depart together. In the series finale, Blair marries Chuck which results in her not having to testify against him in his father's homicide case. Five years later, Blair is shown to be running her mother's successful fashion line and she works with Jenny in a line called "J for Waldorf", and she and Chuck are shown to have a son named Henry.

== Reception and cultural impact ==
=== In print ===
While covering the book series, Janet Malcolm of The New Yorker labeled the character "an antiheroine of the first rank", and asserted that "the series belongs to awful Blair, who inspires von Ziegesar's highest flights of comic fancy." She also compared Blair to vintage film and literary figures such as Becky Sharp of Vanity Fair, and Lizzie Eustace of The Eustace Diamonds. In addition, several critics have likened Blair to the character Lila Fowler of the earlier Sweet Valley High series.

In the 2007 book Children's Literature and Culture, writer Harry Edwin Eiss chastised the depiction of Blair's bulimia. "If handled properly, the inclusion of her illness could have provided a powerful lesson for young adult readers who worry about their weight and food consumption. Unfortunately, Cecily von Ziegesar, the author of the series, presents a seriously flawed treatment of the problem. In a failed attempt at humor, the writer regards Blair's sickness as just another source of gossip," he said. Emily Nussbaum of New York magazine had similar comments, calling the bulimia "more of an icky weakness than a full-fledged pathology." However, she went on to commend Blair as "hilariously self-centered".

Julie Opipari of Manga Maniac Cafe gave the initial Gossip Girl manga a negative review, citing displeasure with the characters and plot. However, she acknowledged that this gave her a greater appreciation for Blair in the second volume, noting that Blair "really had to learn how to rough it" after losing her privileged lifestyle. She went on to state that "Blair is one character that is fun to hate on. So imagine my surprise when I actually started to like her by the end of the book".

=== On screen ===
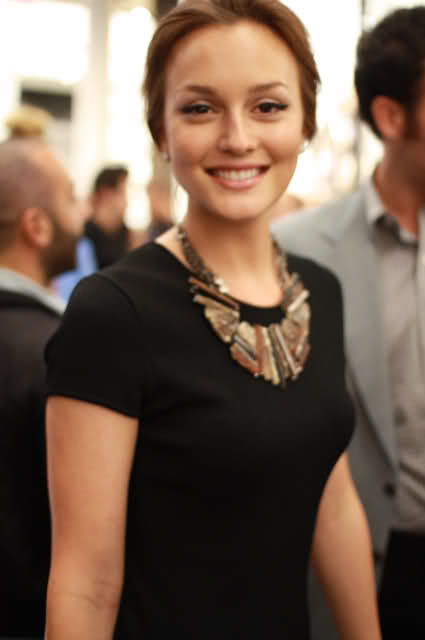
Meester's portrayal of Blair has been met with critical acclaim. The actress prepared by reading Gossip Girl.

The show's breakout character, Blair Waldorf has garnered much media recognition. Yahoo! proclaims Blair a member of "television's pantheon of razor-witted, solipsistic high school Alpha females." While commenting on Meester, New York magazine's 2008 cover story of the series states, "Her villain-you-want-to-root-for is the most sophisticated performance on the show." In another 2008 article, People magazine commented that "Meester has burst out of this ensemble to stardom." Variety described her performance as similar to that of "a predatory junior Joan Collins who practically breathes fire out of her pinched, perfectly WASP-ish nostrils." FHM Online ranked the actress the "Hottest TV Star" of autumn 2008, stating that as Blair Waldorf, "Leighton Meester has stolen the spotlight with her mind-blowing good looks and amazing performance." OK! magazine likened her character to Audrey Hepburn's portrayal of Holly Golightly. The physical similarity was also noted by USA Today.

In its 2009 "Hot List", Rolling Stone cited Blair as "the reason we love the back-stabby soap most." Regarding the fictional fame of Blair's friend Serena, Tim Stack of Entertainment Weekly asserted that "Serena may be the star of the media but Blair is quickly becoming the star of this show." While citing Serena's long-revered allure, Glamour and its readers compared the two characters in 2008, with Blair being recognized as more beautiful than Serena. In a review from The Atlantic, Blair and Serena's friendship was praised as "it offered a relationship whose depth and complexity approached Rory and Paris' [from Gilmore Girls]."

In May 2009, Blair received attention from Forbes, which interviewed her via the series' writers. Television Without Pity listed Meester in their "Golden Globes 2009: Overlooked TV Shows and Performances" article, labeling Blair "so multi-faceted, well-dressed and beautifully played that she elevates this teen soap to something we don't even feel guilty about admitting we love." Meester won the Teen Choice Award for "Choice TV Actress Drama" in 2009, and again in 2010. In 2009, she was voted the "Best Mean Girl" in Zap2it's first poll of the best television characters in the 2000s. In February 2012, Zap2it held another poll to determine TV's Most Crushworthy. Blair was elected TV's Most Crushworthy 1% Female over Temperance "Bones" Brennan. The 1 percenters are people that "have everything going for them with their fantastic good looks and their opulent lifestyle". Her relationship with Chuck Bass was included in TV Guide's list of "The Best TV Couples of All Time" as well as Entertainment Weekly's "30 Best 'Will They/Won't They?' TV Couples".

The character's wardrobe—credited to designers Abigail Lorick and Eric Daman—was popular, earning mentions from periodicals such as InStyle and New York, along with recognition from websites. TV Guide listed Blair among its "Best Dressed TV Characters of 2007". Entertainment Weekly named Blair Waldorf and Chuck Bass the "Most Stylish" characters of 2008. Lifetime television ranks Blair first in its listing of "The Top 10 Best-Dressed TV Characters", while Glamour has named her among its best-dressed TV characters of all time. In a Vanity Fair interview, costume designers Eric Daman and Meredith Markworth-Pollack named Audrey Hepburn and Vogue editor-in-chief Anna Wintour as their inspirations when dressing Meester as Blair. The designers also cited New York socialites Tinsley Mortimer and Arden Wohl as influences. TV Guide named her the sixth most fashionable TV character.
