= Gossip Girl season 1 =

Gossip Girl
- Season 1
- DVD cover art
- Showrunners: Josh Schwartz; Stephanie Savage
- Starring: Blake Lively; Leighton Meester; Penn Badgley; Chace Crawford; Taylor Momsen; Ed Westwick; Jessica Szohr; Kelly Rutherford; Matthew Settle
- No. of episodes: 18

Release
- Original network: The CW
- Original release: September 19, 2007 – May 19, 2008

Season chronology
- Next → Season 2

The first season of the American teen drama television series Gossip Girl premiered on The CW on September 19, 2007, and concluded on May 19, 2008, consisting of 18 episodes. Based on the novel series of the same name by Cecily von Ziegesar, the series was developed for television by Josh Schwartz and Stephanie Savage. It tells the story of Serena van der Woodsen's return to Manhattan's Upper East Side in New York City following her mysterious disappearance to boarding school in Connecticut, while being watched by the anonymous and omniscient blogger Gossip Girl.

The first 13 episodes of Gossip Girl aired in the United States on Wednesdays at 9:00 p.m. on The CW, a terrestrial television network. With the exception of the 12th episode "School Lies", the first 13 episodes aired on the CTV Television Network in Canada one day prior to their U.S. air date. Following the 2007–2008 Writers Guild of America strike, the remainder of the season aired on Mondays at 8:00 p.m. The season was released on DVD as a five-disc box set under the title of Gossip Girl: The Complete First Season on August 19, 2008, by Warner Home Video. The pilot episode was made available as a free download to registered users of the iTunes Store prior to its premiere on television. Subsequent episodes became available to purchase following their original airing.

== Plot ==
The return of "it girl" Serena van der Woodsen (Blake Lively) to the Upper East Side serves as the first season's focal point. Shrouded in mystery and scandal, Serena's disappearance and sudden return are announced by the omniscient blogger Gossip Girl. The news reaches Blair Waldorf (Leighton Meester) whose life is torn apart when the secret behind Serena's leaving is revealed: Serena slept with Nate Archibald (Chace Crawford), the Golden Boy of the Upper East Side and Blair's boyfriend, the night she left town. Nate announces his feelings for Serena a number of times and a series of battles ensue between the former Queen Bee Serena and her heir, Blair. However, the rift resolves in reconciliation between the two and temporary peace follows. Meanwhile, siblings Dan (Penn Badgley) and Jenny Humphrey (Taylor Momsen), Brooklyn residents, are attracted by the opulent wealth of their classmates. Young Jenny becomes a cunning protégée to Blair while Dan enters a relationship with Serena. It is revealed that their relationship resembles the one between Dan's father Rufus (Matthew Settle) and Serena's mother Lily (Kelly Rutherford) in their youth.

As a subplot, Blair and Nate suffer problems in their relationship when the dangerously seductive Chuck Bass (Ed Westwick) conquers Blair's fragile heart. The manipulative Georgina Sparks (Michelle Trachtenberg) arrives, creating a lot of trouble and revealing the real reason behind Serena's disappearance: a death Serena thought she was responsible for. When Georgina arrives on the Upper East Side she poses as a naive girl named Sarah in order to destroy Serena's newfound happiness. She succeeds in exposing Serena's deep-hidden secrets, taking Dan away from her, and outing Serena's brother as gay. At the same time, Blair falls for Chuck, but as a price they both lose their friendships with Nate. Not able to withstand the vulnerability that a real relationship demands, Chuck deserts Blair.

In the midst of all these events, Dan welcomes Vanessa Abrams (Jessica Szohr) back into his life. Vanessa is a childhood friend of his and an outsider herself. She is a threat to his feelings for Serena, until he realizes the real love he has for Serena. At the end of the season, the Upper East Siders team up to expose Georgina and banish her from New York. Serena then leaves with Nate for the Hamptons, while Chuck abandons a heartbroken Blair. Dan reconciles with Vanessa and returns to his old life in Brooklyn. A disgraced Jenny leaves Blair's clique and earns an internship as a fashion designer in the company owned by Blair's mother.

== Cast and characters ==
=== Main ===
- Blake Lively as Serena van der Woodsen
- Leighton Meester as Blair Waldorf
- Penn Badgley as Dan Humphrey
- Chace Crawford as Nate Archibald
- Taylor Momsen as Jenny Humphrey
- Ed Westwick as Chuck Bass
- Jessica Szohr as Vanessa Abrams
- Kelly Rutherford as Lily van der Woodsen
- Matthew Settle as Rufus Humphrey
- Kristen Bell as the voice of Gossip Girl (uncredited)

=== Recurring ===
- Sam Robards as Howard Archibald
- Connor Paolo as Eric van der Woodsen
- Nicole Fiscella as Isabel Coates
- Nan Zhang as Kati Farkas
- Zuzanna Szadkowski as Dorota Kishlovsky
- Robert John Burke as Bart Bass
- Margaret Colin as Eleanor Waldorf
- Michelle Hurd as Laurel
- Jill Flint as Bex Simon
- Francie Swift as Anne Archibald
- Susan Misner as Alison Humphrey
- Amanda Setton as Penelope Shafai
- Dreama Walker as Hazel Williams

=== Guest ===
- Sebastian Stan as Carter Baizen
- John Shea as Harold Waldorf
- Caroline Lagerfelt as CeCe Rhodes
- William Abadie as Roman
- Linda Emond as Headmistress Queller
- Michelle Trachtenberg as Georgina Sparks
- Yin Chang as Nelly Yuki
- Jesse Swenson as Asher Hornsby

== Episodes ==
No. overall	No. in season	Title	Directed by	Written by	Original release date	Prod. code	U.S. viewers (millions)
1	1	"Pilot"	Mark Piznarski	Teleplay by : Josh Schwartz & Stephanie Savage	September 19, 2007	276026	3.50
In the fast-paced and opulent world of the Upper East Side, 16-year-old "it girl" Serena van der Woodsen returns after mysteriously vanishing to boarding school for a year, and her return is announced on the blog of the all-knowing albeit ultra-secretive Gossip Girl. However, her return is met with a cold reception as not everyone in her life believes she has changed, especially her best friend, Blair Waldorf, who Serena and Blair's childhood lover, Nate Archibald are keeping a devastating secret from. Meanwhile in Brooklyn, 16-year-old Dan Humphrey and his 14-year-old sister, Jenny, begin to explore the affluent world as Dan begins to go out with the reformed "it" girl.
2	2	"The Wild Brunch"	Mark Piznarski	Josh Schwartz & Stephanie Savage	September 26, 2007	3T6751	2.48
In the wake of the Kiss on the Lips party, Blair reveals to Serena what she knows about the night she disappeared. As if it could not get any messier, Serena decides to take Dan to his arch-enemy Chuck's fundraiser brunch at The Palace. Jenny seeks advice from Blair, who realizes she may have something to gain by allowing Jenny into her inner circle. Title reference: The 1969 film The Wild Bunch.
3	3	"Poison Ivy"	J. Miller Tobin	Felicia D. Henderson	October 3, 2007	3T6752	2.75
As the Upper East Side teens from Constance Billard and St. Jude's prepare for a much-anticipated visit from the Ivy League representatives, Blair and Chuck uncover a scandalous secret about Serena that may not remain a secret much longer. Dan has his heart and future set on the coveted usher position for the Dartmouth rep, only to be beaten out by Nate, who has no interest in the school despite pressure from his controlling father, The Captain. Meanwhile, Jenny bonds with Serena's younger brother, Eric, and Rufus must swallow his pride and ask Lily for a favor to help his son, Dan, despite their complicated history. Title reference: The 1992 film of the same name.
4	4	"Bad News Blair"	Patrick Norris	Joshua Safran	October 10, 2007	3T6753	2.80
Blair is thrilled when her mother, Eleanor, chooses her to be the new face of her clothing line. However, Blair's happiness soon turns to feelings of betrayal and jealousy when Serena moves into the spotlight and Blair finds herself back in Serena's shadow. Meanwhile, Serena and Dan are reminded once again that they come from two very different worlds. Nate and Chuck indulge in a boys' weekend to blow off steam after Ivy Week, but when an old classmate shows up, it tests Chuck and Nate's friendship. Title reference: The 1976 film The Bad News Bears.
5	5	"Dare Devil"	Jamie Babbit	Lenn K. Rosenfeld	October 17, 2007	3T6754	2.41
Dan makes elaborate plans to impress Serena on their first official date. The same night, Jenny is invited to the infamous Blair Waldorf sleepover and finds herself in a high-stakes game of "truth or dare". Meanwhile, when Lily discovers that Eric is missing from his treatment center, she finds herself seeking help from an unexpected source. Title reference: The 2003 film Daredevil.
6	6	"The Handmaiden's Tale"	Norman Buckley	Jessica Queller	October 24, 2007	3T6755	2.54
Dan is torn between two girls as an old childhood friend, Vanessa, returns to town with a confession as Serena and Dan figure out what they mean to each other. At the infamous masked ball, Blair sends Nate on a scavenger hunt, but Nate makes a shocking confession to a disguised Jenny who uses it as ammunition against Blair. Finally, Lily asks Rufus to accompany her to an Eleanor Waldorf event in order to make Bart Bass jealous. Note: This is Jessica Szohr's first appearance as Vanessa Abrams. Title reference: The 1985 book The Handmaid's Tale.
7	7	"Victor, Victrola"	Tony Wharmby	K.J. Steinberg	November 7, 2007	3T6756	2.52
After surviving the on-again/off-again pattern of their new relationship, Serena and Dan admit their true feelings to each other, and consider taking their relationship to the next level. Chuck contemplates investing in a burlesque club in the hopes of making his hard-to-please father, Bart, proud of him. Nate and the Captain come to blows regarding the Captain's apparent drug problem. Jenny discovers a secret that her father Rufus and mother Alison have been keeping from her. After learning about what Nate said, Blair commits the ultimate act of betrayal. Title reference: The 1982 film Victor Victoria.
8	8	"Seventeen Candles"	Lee Shallat-Chemel	Story by : Felicia D. Henderson; Teleplay by : Joshua Safran & Felicia D. Henderson	November 14, 2007	3T6757	2.95
Despite being devastated by the current state of her relationship with Nate and still dealing with the guilt from her recent indiscretion, Blair attempts to put on a happy face for her 17th birthday party and hide the truth from her friends. Hoping to ease the tension between Serena and Vanessa, Dan takes Vanessa to Blair's party so the girls can have some bonding time. Jenny brings her mother (Susan Misner) home for a surprise visit, but Rufus may not be ready to forgive and forget. Nate's parents (Sam Robards and Francie Swift) ask him to make a huge sacrifice in an effort to salvage his father's business as he faces charges of embezzlement and fraud. Title reference: The 1984 film Sixteen Candles.
9	9	"Blair Waldorf Must Pie!"	Mark Piznarski	Story by : Lenn K. Rosenfeld; Teleplay by : Jessica Queller & K.J. Steinberg	November 28, 2007	3T6758	2.93
After getting kicked out of the annual Waldorf Thanksgiving, Serena and her family decide to head over to Brooklyn to spend it with the Humphreys, unaware of the torrid history between Rufus, Alison, and Lily. Meanwhile, Blair's emotions spiral out of control when she learns that her father is not coming home for Thanksgiving, which starts up Blair's "issue" Nate spends the holiday with his mom and dad, but their awkward dinner quickly goes from bad to worse. Title reference: The 2006 film John Tucker Must Die.
10	10	"Hi, Society"	Patrick Norris	Joshua Safran	December 5, 2007	3T6759	2.44
Serena's plan to avoid the annual Cotillion Ball is sidetracked when her grandmother CeCe persuades her to attend. Dan and Cece begin to clash due to her history with Lily and Rufus. Nate is confused by Blair’s new indifferent attitude and enlists Chuck to find out the reason. Chuck spreads a rumor that a certain alum that Nate has bad blood with is the reason for Blair’s newfound behavior. Meanwhile, Jenny attends the ball despite it being on the same night as Alison's art gallery opening. Title reference: The 1956 film High Society.
11	11	"Roman Holiday"	Michael Fields	Jessica Queller	December 19, 2007	3T6760	1.81
When Blair's father, Harold, comes home for the holidays with an unexpected guest—his boyfriend, Roman (William Abadie)—Blair hatches a plan to get rid of Roman for good. Jenny and Vanessa help Serena plan the best Christmas surprise for Dan, who may have a surprise of his own in mind for Serena. Rufus refuses to remain the understanding husband any longer after Alison's former lover calls the house. Title reference: The 1953 film of the same name.
12	12	"School Lies"	Tony Wharmby	Lenn K. Rosenfeld	January 2, 2008	3T6761	2.19
A casual break in for a night swim leads to the whole junior class facing expulsion after one student gets seriously injured, and Dan and Serena's relationship begins to break apart as he is not ready to take the fall and risk his future. Vanessa is working on a documentary project about private schools and accidentally captures Blair and Chuck discussing their affair. Lily contemplates telling Rufus how she really feels about him. Title reference: The 1992 film School Ties.
13	13	"A Thin Line Between Chuck and Nate"	Norman Buckley	Felicia D. Henderson	January 9, 2008	3T6762	2.27
Gossip Girl takes pleasure in reporting that Serena was spotted buying pregnancy tests—but of course, the teens of the Upper East Side prove yet again there is always more to the story than meets the eye. Title reference: The 1996 film A Thin Line Between Love and Hate.
14	14	"The Blair Bitch Project"	J. Miller Tobin	K.J. Steinberg	April 21, 2008	3T6763	2.50
Having been recently dethroned as "Queen Bee", Blair hesitantly returns to school with the support of her only friend, Serena. Meanwhile, Serena struggles to adjust to her new living arrangements with her future step-brother, Chuck, while receiving disturbing packages from an unknown sender. Jenny needs something to wear to her birthday party and her drive to be popular hits a new all-time high when she does something illegal to fit in with her new Upper East Side friends. Note: From this episode on, Szohr (Vanessa) is added to the main cast and is credited in the opening titles. Title reference: The 1999 film The Blair Witch Project.
15	15	"Desperately Seeking Serena"	Michael Fields	Felicia D. Henderson	April 28, 2008	3T6764	2.53
Serena's new image is turned upside down when her former friend and partner in all things bad, Georgina Sparks (Michelle Trachtenberg), returns to Manhattan to stir up trouble and bring back the old Serena, and it leads to lies and secrets between Dan and Serena. Nate finds romance with the last person he was expecting to connect with, Vanessa. Jenny meets a cute sophomore boy, Asher Hornsby, who just might be her ticket to permanent popularity. Finally, Blair hatches a secret plan to sabotage her biggest rival, Nelly Yuki (Yin Chang). Title reference: The 1985 film Desperately Seeking Susan.
16	16	"All About My Brother"	Janice Cooke	Paul Sciarrotta	May 5, 2008	3T6765	2.12
Georgina blackmails Serena with a secret that could ruin her future. Blair and Jenny escalate their "popularity war" by spreading scandalous rumors about each other through Gossip Girl. Dan witnesses Jenny's new boyfriend, Asher, cheating on her with a boy. Rufus goes to Lily for advice on how to handle Jenny's recent out-of-character behavior. Eric comes out of the closet. Title reference: The 1999 film All About My Mother.
17	17	"Woman on the Verge"	Tony Wharmby	Joshua Safran	May 12, 2008	3T6766	2.71
Following her confession, Serena begins to unravel and fall back into old habits. Angry with how Serena has been lately, Dan has been growing closer with "Sarah", but Vanessa is onto who “Sarah” really is. Rufus is thrilled when his band is invited to perform at a Rolling Stone-sponsored concert, but Lily is the last person he expects to see at the performance, especially since her wedding rehearsal dinner is on the same night. Title reference: The 1988 film Women on the Verge of a Nervous Breakdown.
18	18	"Much 'I Do' About Nothing"	Norman Buckley	Josh Schwartz & Stephanie Savage	May 19, 2008	3T6767	3.00
With Serena's newfound clean slate on the line, Blair decides to take matters into her own hands in dealing with the manipulative and evil Georgina Sparks. With Rufus never far from her thoughts, Lily prepares for her wedding day which is destined to be the Upper East Side's social event of the year. Serena finally confesses the truth to Dan, but Dan thinks it's too little too late. As Nate begins to think his family's troubles are finally behind them, he is in for a rude awakening. Chuck and Blair finally confess their long held feelings for each other. Guest star: Lydia Hearst as Amelia Title reference: William Shakespeare's play Much Ado About Nothing.

== Casting ==
The initial season had nine major roles receive star billing. Blake Lively portrayed initial protagonist Serena van der Woodsen, a former it girl of the Upper East Side, who returns from a mysterious stay at a boarding school in Connecticut, with Kelly Rutherford playing her mother Lily, a multiple-divorced socialite. Leighton Meester played Queen Bee, and the show's eventual protagonist, Blair Waldorf, who is less than happy to see her best friend return. Penn Badgley acted as middle-class outsider Dan Humphrey, with Matthew Settle playing his father Rufus, former rock star turned art dealer, and Taylor Momsen portraying his sister, Jenny, a freshman looking to fit in with the elite crowd at Constance Billiard. Chace Crawford portrayed Blair's boyfriend Nate Archibald, who has a thing for Serena. Ed Westwick played a womanizing player and 'bad boy' Chuck Bass. Originally only a guest star, Jessica Szohr starred as Dan's childhood best friend, Vanessa Abrams. Szohr gained a contract to the main cast list in the fourteenth episode.

Kristen Bell voiced "Gossip Girl", whose gossip commentary blog is widely visited by the youths of the Upper East Side social scene. Numerous supporting characters were given expansive and recurring appearances in the progressive storyline, including Connor Paolo who portrayed Serena's brother, Eric van der Woodsen, who had been placed into a rehab center following a suicide attempt. Margaret Colin acted as Blair's mother, Eleanor Waldorf, a fashion designer. Colin took over from Florencia Lozano who played the role in the pilot episode. Michelle Trachtenberg acts as Georgina Sparks, a girl from Serena's past who returns after escaping rehab in Utah. Sam Robards and Francie Swift portrayed Nate's parents Howard and Anne Archibald. Nicole Fiscella and Nan Zhang acted as Blair's loyal sidekicks Isabel Coates and Kati Farkas. Zhang left the series to study neuroscience at Johns Hopkins University with Serena explaining that Kati and her family had moved to Israel. Kati was replaced with the character of Nelly Yuki played by Yin Chang. Zhang would return to the show in season 4. Other members of Blair's clique include Amanda Setton as Penelope Shafai, Dreama Walker as Hazel Williams and Emma Demar as Elise Wells.

Other guest stars in recurring roles include Zuzanna Szadkowski as Blair's maid Dorota Kishlovsky, Robert John Burke as Chuck's father and billionaire Bart Bass, Susie Misner as Rufus's estranged wife Alison Humphrey and John Shea as Blair's father Harold Waldorf, with William Abadie as his partner Roman.

== Crew ==
The season was produced by Warner Bros. Television, Alloy Entertainment and College Hill Pictures. The executive producers were creators Josh Schwartz and Stephanie Savage with Bob Levy and Leslie Morgenstein. K.J. Steinberg and Felicia D. Henderson served as co-executive producers. Producers include Joe Lazarov and Jessica Queller. The season was produced by Amy Kaufman. Jonathan C. Brody served as co-producer with Joshua Safran as consulting producer.

The staff writers were Schwartz, Savage, Henderson, Safran, Lenn K. Rosenfeld, Queller, Steinberg and Paul Sciarrotta. The regular directors throughout the season were Mark Piznarski, J. Miller Tobin, Patrick Norris, Norman Buckley, Tony Wharmby and Michael Fields.

== Reception ==
Due to the show's pedigree as an adaptation of The New York Times bestselling novel series, the show was considered to be one of the more anticipated new shows of the 2007–2008 television season. An August 2007 survey by OTX, a global media research and consulting firm, placed the show on the list of top ten new shows that viewers were aware of. The pilot episode gained 3.50 million viewers on its original airing, having previously been available as a free download on the American iTunes store. As the season progressed, ratings dropped with 2.48 million viewers tuning into the second episode. The eleventh episode marked a season low with only 1.81 million viewers tuning into watch the episode. The show was moved from Wednesdays at 9:00 p.m. to Mondays at 8:00 p.m following the end on the 2007–2008 Writers Guild of America strike where the final five episodes of the season were aired. Ratings increased for the season finale, with 3.00 million viewers tuning into the episode. Gossip Girl's digital video recorder ratings were high, increasing the show's profitability and the show had also been in the top five of iTunes sales.

Author Cecily von Ziegesar has expressed support for the show, noting that all of her major plot points were present in the pilot. The second episode in which the characters are shown to be attending a brunch gained some approval from New York magazine, stating that "there's no such thing as 'lunch' on the weekends", "that kids actually do venture outside of their neighborhoods" (since The New York Palace Hotel is in Midtown Manhattan), and "saying you live in Williamsburg makes much more sense... for real-estate emotional conflict", as well as the fact Rihanna is played "in every situation." Gossip Girl was designated the "Best. Show. Ever." in April 2008 by New York magazine. Other positive reviews came from publications Variety and the Boston Globe. John Maynard of The Washington Post felt that creator Josh Schwartz "turns it up a notch" from his former series The O.C., and cited Dan (Penn Badgley) as a standout character. Tim Goodman of the San Francisco Chronicle praised the show for its use of "Gossip Girl"'s blog as a new media element noting "there's a chance to tell a story where the Greek chorus essentially has a blog."

The show has come under criticism for containing scenes too risqué for its teen audience. The Parents Television Council (PTC) has shown particular criticism of the series, especially with its "OMFG" ad campaign used towards the end of the season in April 2008. It also named the episode "Victor, Victrola" the worst television program of the week in which the episode originally was broadcast. The Parents Council's negative comments include it being "the most-watched show among girls 12-17 and glamorizes casual sex and drug use among teens. [And that] storylines have featured a would-be teen rapist, threesome among teens, and teenage girls having sex with adults." Scott D. Pierce of the Deseret Morning News noted that the show is milder than a lot of what's shown on MTV, but still warned parents of several scenes in the pilot. He said it includes "among other things, a teenage girl climbing on top of a boy and removing his clothes; drunken teens having sex; teens smoking pot; teens drinking in bars, in a limo and at a party; a teen boy getting amorous with a girl who fights him off; and that same teen boy essentially attempting to rape a freshman girl who is supposed to be, what, 14?".

The series has also been criticized for having less-than believable storylines, and has been described as a guilty pleasure rather than an hour's worth of must-watch television.

== DVD release ==
The DVD release of season one was released by Warner Home Video in the United States on August 19, 2008, after it had completed broadcast on television. As well as every episode from the season, the DVD release features bonus material including a downloadable audiobook, deleted scenes, and behind-the-scenes featurettes.

Gossip Girl: The Complete First Season
Set details		Special features	
18 episodes; 5-disc set; 1.78:1 aspect ratio; English (Dolby Surround 5.1); Portuguese (Dolby Surround 2.0); Subtitles: English, French, Spanish, Chinese, Korean, Portuguese, Thai; Runtime: 752 minutes		Unaired Scenes; Gag reel; The Pierces Music Videos: Boring; Secret; Downloadable audiobook of the original best-selling novel read by Christina Ricci; Featurettes; The Beginning, XOXO: Conception to Execution; Gossip Girl Couture; A Gossip Girl Wedding	
Release dates
United States	Canada	United Kingdom	Australia
August 19, 2008		August 18, 2008	April 15, 2009
