= Gone Maybe Gone =

- Gossip Girl episode
- Episode no.: Season 6 Episode 1
- Directed by: Mark Tinker
- Written by: Josh Schwartz; Stephanie Savage
- Cinematography by: Mauricio Rubinstein
- Editing by: Marc Pattavina
- Original air date: October 8, 2012
- Running time: 42 minutes

Guest appearances
- Sofia Black-D'Elia as Sage; Robert John Burke as Bart Bass; Andrea Gabriel as Amira; Barry Watson as Steven; Roby Schinasi as Jean-Pierre; Aaron Schwartz as Vanya; Michelle Trachtenberg as Georgina Sparks; Karen Contreras as housekeeper; Alexandra Fiber as female train passenger; Rhett Kalman as groom #1

Episode chronology
← Previous "The Return of the Ring"	Next → "High Infidelity"
- Gossip Girl season 6

"Gone Maybe Gone" is the first episode of the sixth and final season of the American teen drama television series Gossip Girl, and the 112th episode overall. Written by series developers Josh Schwartz and Stephanie Savage and directed by Mark Piznarski, the episode originally aired on The CW on October 8, 2012.

Gossip Girl follows the lives of a group of young adults coming from a wealthy background. In this episode, the group consisting of Blair Waldorf (Leighton Meester), Chuck Bass (Ed Westwick), Nate Archibald (Chace Crawford) Dan Humphrey (Penn Badgley), and Georgina Sparks (Michelle Trachtenberg), tries to find Serena van der Woodsen (Blake Lively) who has not given any news during the summer. Trachtenberg and Robert John Burke returned in guest star capacity, along with newcomers Andrea Gabriel, Barry Watson, Sofia Black-D'Elia, and Roby Schinasi.

Upon its initial airing, the episode was viewed by 0.78 million Americans and garnered a 0.4/1 Nielsen rating/share in the 18–49 demographic, registering as the series' least-watched premiere. Despite the low ratings, the premiere received mixed to positive reviews from television critics praising the writing, except the development of Rufus and Ivy's storyline, which was criticized.

== Plot ==
In the fifth-season finale, Blair Waldorf (Leighton Meester) decides she wants to have a relationship with Chuck Bass (Ed Westwick) and she meets him in a casino of Monte Carlo. Serena van der Woodsen (Blake Lively) leaves New York City after being rejected by Blair and Dan Humphrey (Penn Badgley) and does drugs with a stranger in a train. Dan decides to expose the real world of the Upper East Side in his new book and teams up with Georgina Sparks (Michelle Trachtenberg) while Nate Archibald (Chace Crawford) tries to unmask Gossip Girl. Lily Bass (Kelly Rutherford) annuls her marriage to Rufus Humphrey (Matthew Settle) in order to get back with Bart Bass (Robert John Burke) who recently resurfaced. Ivy Dickens (Kaylee DeFer) plans to take down Lily with the help of Lola Rhodes (Ella Rae Peck). "Gone Maybe Gone" picks up right after those events; Blair and Chuck have sex in a room of the casino's hotel, Serena is seen unconscious in the train, Dan is in Italy with Georgina who tries to make him write, and Nate prints pictures of a video featuring the masked Gossip Girl.

Four months later, Lily and Bart come back from their holidays in the Hamptons during which they renewed their vows. It also revealed that Lily has not been in touch with her daughter, Serena, for the whole summer. Blair is running her mother's clothing company in Paris, Dan continues the writing of his book with Georgina, Nate is working at The Spectator, and Chuck is in Dubai trying to find what his father was doing there, before he faked his death and reappeared months ago, with the help of his father's translator, Amira (Andrea Gabriel). When the group receives the news that Serena has gone missing, Blair, Dan, Georgina and Chuck fly back to New York to find her. Ivy has moved in with Rufus letting him believe that she has no money anymore and no place to live to manipulate him and destroy Lily.

Having no clue as where Serena might be, Nate sends Gossip Girl the video he had of her obtaining in exchange the location where Serena is. The group goes at the location and finds Serena who goes by the name of Sabrina and has a new boyfriend, Steven (Barry Watson). As it looks like a wedding will take place and that Serena is the one who is getting married, Blair and Georgina tell the truth about who Serena is, ruining the wedding of two men; Serena was only a maid of honor. Blair apologizes to Serena for the mean words she said to her months ago but she responds that she wants a fresh start with Steven.

It is revealed that Blair and Chuck made a pact to stay apart from each other in order to allow them to accomplish things in their careers before getting back together for good. Since Steven now knows who Serena is, she decides to go back to New York with him. After Amira has received money to remain silent about Bart's actions in Dubai, she goes at Chuck's and tells him she will help him find what he is hiding. Meanwhile, Nate goes out for a drink with Sage (Sofia Black-D'Elia), a girl who wants to interview him. As Dan is heading to his apartment in Brooklyn, he discovers his father and Ivy in bed together.

== Production ==
The episode was written by Josh Schwartz and Stephanie Savage (one of the few episodes co-written by Schwartz, and his since season two's "Valley Girls"), while Mark Piznarski directed it. Schwartz revealed the title of the episode on June 26, 2012, via his Twitter account. Filming started on July 5, 2012 with some scenes being shot in Melville, New York. The dress worn by Serena (Lively) was designed by Jenny Packham. Michelle Trachtenberg and Robert John Burke reprised their guest star role as Georgina Sparks and Bart Bass whereas Andrea Gabriel, Barry Watson, Sofia Black-D'Elia, and Roby Schinasi made their first appearances as Amira, Steven, Sage, and Jean-Pierre, respectively. Featured music included The Ting Tings' "Hang It Up", Ladyhawke's "Gone Gone Gone", The xx's "Angels", and Rebecca & Fiona's "Dance".

Executive producer Sara Goodman said that she did not want Rufus "to sit there moping" after Lily chose to annul her marriage to him to be with Bart in the season five finale. She explained the storyline involving Rufus and Ivy was imagined in the fifth season as some connections had been witnessed and that "it made sense in terms of them ending up together."

== Reception ==
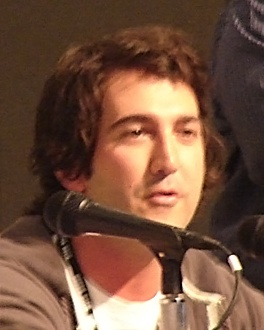
Josh Schwartz and Stephanie Savage's script was lauded.

"Gone Maybe Gone" was first broadcast on October 8, 2012, in the United States on The CW Television Network (The CW). The episode was watched by 0.78 million Americans and scored a 0.4/1 Nielsen rating/share in the adults among the 18–49 demographic. Registering as the least-watched episode of the entire series, "Gone Maybe Gone" was down 33% in viewers, from the previous episode "The Return of the Ring", which netted 1.14 million American viewers and a 0.6/2 Nielsen rating/share during its initial airing and it also represented a decrease of 45% in comparison to the season five premiere.

"'Gone Maybe Gone' was what we always hope Gossip Girl will be, pushing the characters' boundaries while uniting them in a common goal."

— Steve Marsi of TV Fanatic

The episode received mixed to positive reviews. Prior to its broadcast, Verne Gay of Newsday gave the installment a B grade, describing it as "breezy, entertaining and –as usual– sharply written." Entertainment Weekly's Sandra Gonzalez wrote that "this final season of kicked off in fine form". Steve Marsi of TV Fanatic, who appreciated the OMG-moments, the introduction of new mysteries, and the hilarious lines, praised Savage and Schwartz's writing as the episode "revived the entire series and raised expectations for Gossip Girl going out on top". TV columnist for The Huffington Post, Laura Prudom applauded Savage and Schwartz's script which "recaptured some of the sparkle that has been missing for the past few years". She enjoyed the "in-jokes, knowing winks and sharp one-liners", and that the characters were "sane" and "rational". She called Blair and Chuck's deal "a fairly sensible agreement" while deeming Dan's story arc "the most childish of the bunch".

Prudom found that Lily's reunion with Bart and the Rufus/Ivy storyline were uninteresting. While Marsi named the development of the relationship between Rufus and Ivy "creepy", Sydney Bucksbaum of Hollywood.com expressed criticism towards it, feeling it "was about a billion steps too far" because Rufus had always been like a father for Ivy. The Wall Street Journal writer Dawn Fallik was also critical of this move calling it "gross". Catriona Wightman of Digital Spy was disappointed by the premiere because everything that happened felt déjà vu. She found that the episode fell "flat" and called the intrigue of finding Serena "a bore". She, however, liked Dan's speech to Blair and highlighted the moments shared by Blair and Georgina. The A.V. Club awarded the installment a D− grade describing what followed the search of Serena as "a traumatic zombie movie".
