= Hi, Society =

- Gossip Girl episode
- Dan and Serena dance at the cotillion.
- Episode no.: Season 1 Episode 10
- Directed by: Patrick Norris
- Teleplay by: Joshua Safran
- Production code: 3T6759
- Original air date: December 5, 2007

Guest appearances
- Caroline Lagerfelt as Celia "CeCe" Rhodes; Connor Paolo as Eric van der Woodsen; Nicole Fiscella as Isabel Coates; Nan Zhang as Kati Farkas; Susan Misner as Alison Humphrey; Sebastian Stan as Carter Baizen

Episode chronology
← Previous "Blair Waldorf Must Pie!"	Next → "Roman Holiday"
- Gossip Girl season 1

"Hi, Society" is the tenth episode of the first season of The CW television series, Gossip Girl. The episode was written by Joshua Safran and directed by Patrick Norris. It originally aired on December 5, 2007, on The CW. The episode received positive reviews from reviewers and critics. The character of CeCe Rhodes received critical praise throughout the episode.

"Hi, Society" focuses mainly on the growing relationship between Dan Humphrey (Penn Badgley) and Serena van der Woodsen (Blake Lively), the complex love-triangle between Nate Archibald (Chace Crawford), Chuck Bass (Ed Westwick) and Blair Waldorf (Leighton Meester), and the slow transformation of Jenny Humphrey (Taylor Momsen) from an outsider to a social climber. The episode further delves into the difficult relationship between Rufus Humphrey (Matthew Settle) and Lily van der Woodsen (Kelly Rutherford) and introduces a new recurring guest character to the series, CeCe Rhodes, Lily's mother and Serena's grandmother, portrayed by veteran actress Caroline Lagerfelt.

== Plot ==
The episode opens with Blair and Serena discussing cotillion. Blair expresses her relief at moving on from Nate and Serena reminds Blair that she won't be attending. Meanwhile, Nate tells Chuck that he's falling for Blair again. While practicing for the cotillion, CeCe Rhodes (Caroline Lagerfelt), Lily's mother and Serena's grandmother, arrives with masked disappointment when she receives news that Serena won't be making her debut and meets Dan, whom she views as responsible for Serena not going. Jenny worriedly ponders her decision on attending her mother's art exhibition or volunteering at cotillion. While Blair and Chuck make out in her room, Nate arrives at Blair's loft, waiting for her. Nate proceeds to apologize with the intent to win Blair back, and succeeds in doing so when he shows her a pin that she sewed into his sweater sleeve. Blair accepts his offer to attend the cotillion with Nate as friends, unaware that Chuck has been listening to their conversation. At the gallery, Jenny and Rufus have an argument over her attending cotillion instead of her mother's art exhibition. Alison (Susan Misner) walks in, hoping to surprise Jenny with shoes she bought from a thrift store until Jenny flatly rejects the shoes. As the Rhodes women bond over Serena's boarding school trips and stories, CeCe privately tells Lily of her illness, revealing more of Lily's past when she states that she did not attend her cotillion when she was younger, and slowly manipulating her into forcing Serena to attend cotillion. While lying to Lily about having permission to go to cotillion, Jenny and Lily run into Alison and Lily inadvertently reveals Jenny's lying, leaving immediately. Jenny guiltily sees a pair of shoes that Alison had been intending to purchase for her.

During a luncheon at the Waldorf apartment, CeCe introduces Carter Baizen (Sebastian Stan) to Serena as her escort. The aura of wealth and affluence eventually makes Dan uncomfortable at the party and CeCe toys with his exclusion from Serena's high society world. Her intention is to turn Dan against Serena but instead he tells Serena that he will be her escort. Alison and Jenny have another argument that soon drives Alison into asserting her parental role and demands Jenny's presence at her art exhibit. Chuck however, has other plans when he confronts Blair regarding Nate. Blair coldly dismisses him while she waits for Carter to retrieve the jacket he left but Chuck uses Carter's attendance in cotillion to toy with Nate. At the gallery, CeCe decides to take matters into her own hands and attempts to bribe Rufus by offering to purchase every painting in the gallery in return for convincing Dan to revoke escorting Serena. Rufus declines the bribe, stating that Dan can't be bought. CeCe callously tells him that Serena can be bribed just like Lily, and reveals that she forced Lily to choose between Rufus and her inheritance. At the Van der Woodsen suite, CeCe expresses her disappointment over Serena's presentation statement and forces Lily to change it while Serena calls for Jenny, revealing that Dan will be her escort while Jenny takes matters into her own hands and goes to cotillion. Hoping to convince Serena of her grandmother's manipulative nature, Dan reveals to her all of CeCe's actions since her arrival but fails to persuade her.

As cotillion proceeds, Serena discovers the change in her presentation statement and is angered to discover her mother's involvement in it. Carter messes with her statement and extensively humiliates her mother, her grandmother, and the announcer. While dancing, Chuck tells Nate that Carter just flirted with Blair and Nate accidentally starts a brawl that results in him and Carter being escorted out by security. The brawl damages Blair's dress, and she persuades Jenny to fix the dress in return for forgiveness causing Jenny to miss her mother's art exhibition. Serena later discovers from Carter that CeCe has been manipulating her all along while Lily calls Dan to tell him to fight for Serena. As Chuck offers to dance with Blair, she assumes that Chuck has been planning to ruin her and leaves him. Serena soon confronts her grandmother, ambiguously telling her granddaughter that her illness might be true but the two are surprised to see Dan, waiting for Serena and beginning their first dance.

In pursuit of Blair, Chuck finds her kissing Nate on the hotel stairway, breaking his heart. Jenny arrives at the gallery but finds it empty, with Alison giving her advice to reflect on the person she's becoming. As the night closes, Rufus calls Lily saying that he now knows why she left him, further stating that he wished that he had never let her do so. The ending montage shows Blair and Nate kissing romantically on a bed, and then having sex, Dan carrying Serena out of the hotel lobby, Lily looking on at Dan and Serena, CeCe taking pills (confirming that her illness is genuine), and Chuck leaving Manhattan.

== Production ==
This episode marks the first appearance of Caroline Lagerfelt as CeCe Rhodes. Sebastian Stan reprises his role as Carter Baizen after his first appearance in the fourth episode of the first season, "Bad News Blair".

=== Fashion and music ===
The Pierces performed live during the Cotillion.

When asked to design and produce a dress for the Cotillion episode of Gossip Girl, costume designer Eric Daman told New York Magazine,

[It] was actually the first dress I ever got to design myself for the series. I was given [an] advance notice from the producers that this was coming down the pipeline and it might be nice to design something that was extra special. So in three days we made this gown. [Blair's] mom Eleanor had supposedly designed it, and Eleanor is based on Carolina Herrera a little bit, so I was doing a little vintage Carolina. But I wanted Blair Waldorf to have this big bow, so I had a giant bow on the shoulder. I really wanted Blair’s dress to be Marie Antoinette–inspired."

Eric Daman considers Blair's silver brocade gown as one of his eleven favorite looks from the series during a September interview for New York Magazine, calling it "very beautiful and retro."

The Pierces performed live "Secret" and "Three Wishes" from their third album Thirteen Tales of Love and Revenge, during the Debutante Ball. The song "Secret" also appears in Pretty Little Liars, as the theme song.

== Reception ==
"Hi, Society" garnered 2.44 million viewers and positive reviews from critics. Scott Tobias of The A.V. Club praised the writer's direction of the episode, stating "Gossip Girl needs evil like a flower needs the rain." and positively compared "Hi Society" to the previous episode, "Blair Waldorf Must Pie!". "[...] last week’s hideous Thanksgiving episode was an anomaly mostly because of the holiday: Thanksgiving is supposed to be about family and togetherness, after all, so it was the antithesis of the petty manipulation and dysfunction that makes this show purr. The moment it became clear that “Hi, Society” was going to center around a cotillion—that deliciously antiquated ritual left over from the earliest days of New York high society—I had a feeling the show would find itself again." Tobias also assessed the character development of Jenny Humphrey. "The only real complaint I have with this episode is the fairly graceless way Jenny’s descent into snobbery was handled. I think it’s a good idea to have this very young girl poised between two different worlds—one that buys its extravagant shoes from Saks and the one she has the economic misfortune to occupy. Jenny’s flirtation with Blair is a temptation to the dark side that a girl of her age and insecurity would find hard to resist [...] I wish Jenny showed a little of the independent-mindedness that helped her survive Blair’s slumber party ambush several weeks ago. By the end of the episode, it looked like Jenny was unconvinced by her mother’s scolding, which can only be good for a show that’s firmly back in its element. Tobias praised the writers' handling of the Blair/Nate/Chuck love triangle, the Blair-Chuck relationship, and Chuck's development. "I’m not entirely sold on Nate’s about-face with regard to Blair, but it made for some juicy intrigue as Blair continued her dalliance with Chuck while slowly letting Nate back into her life. Chuck goes from the proud, devilish peacock [...] to the spurned, vengeful lover at the end."

The character of CeCe received critical praise throughout the episode. Movieline listed CeCe Rhodes in their list of The 5 Worst Mothers on Television Today, describing her as cold and manipulative and enumerated her many manipulations during the episode. New York Magazine praised the revived social class tension between Dan and Serena as well as the character of CeCe, stating that "[she] reminded us that even old ladies can be catty bitches." further praised her character attributes, particularly her "nakedly manipulative, as fabulously coiffed, simply as stone-cold awesome" and for expanding the character storyline behind Lily and Rufus' past. Scott Tobias also praised the character of CeCe, declaring "The big star of tonight’s hour was Serena’s beloved Grandma CeCe, a character that would have been perfect for Angela Lansbury circa The Manchurian Candidate. So prim, so refined, so wonderfully malevolent, she seems to lurk around every corner and drinks cocktails like rocket fuel, never letting her ice to get too lonely."
