= The Wild Brunch =

- Gossip Girl episode
- Serena reenacting Dan's "wave".
- Episode no.: Season 1 Episode 2
- Directed by: Mark Piznarski
- Written by: Josh Schwartz; Stephanie Savage
- Production code: 3T6751
- Original air date: September 26, 2007

Guest appearances
- Robert John Burke as Bart Bass; Connor Paolo as Eric van der Woodsen; Sam Robards as Howard Archibald; Nicole Fiscella as Isabel Coates; Nan Zhang as Kati Farkas

Episode chronology
← Previous "Pilot"	Next → "Poison Ivy"
- Gossip Girl season 1

"The Wild Brunch" is the second episode of the CW television series Gossip Girl. Josh Schwartz and Stephanie Savage wrote the episode; it was directed by Mark Piznarski. It premiered on The CW on September 26, 2007.

The episode relates the story a day after Blair's "Kiss on the Lips" party where Dan Humphrey discovers Serena van der Woodsen's past affair with Nate Archibald while his sister Jenny becomes one of Blair Waldorf's acquaintances. The relationship of Dan and Jenny's father Rufus and Serena's mother Lily is also brought into light.

The episode title is a play from the film The Wild Bunch.

== Plot ==
Jenny and Dan wake up from the events of last night where Jenny mocks Dan for doing "the wave". Dan figures that he should explain to Serena what "the wave" meant, while Jenny goes to Blair for help with Chuck. Serena on the other hand thought that Dan hated her when he did "the wave" and goes to Blair's place to ask what the staredown meant at the party. Blair for her part does not want anything to do with Serena, and hopes she doesn't show up at Chuck's father Bart's annual brunch.

After telling Serena that she knows what transpired between her and Nate the night Serena left, Blair orders Serena to leave her and her group alone. Meanwhile, at the Palace, Nate and Dan encounter each other waiting for Serena. Chuck sees Dan and it almost comes to blows; Nate restrains Chuck and leads him off to Bart's brunch.

At the Waldorf penthouse, Jenny confides to Blair about Chuck, and the junior assures her that Chuck hasn't said anything yet. Jenny then helps Blair dress up for the brunch, and as a reward, Blair gives her one of her mother Eleanor's old dresses. Meanwhile, Rufus meets Lily in Brooklyn, and tells her that Dan "might be the guy Serena needs."

Dan and Serena meet outside the Palace, and after explaining about "the wave," he invites her to eat, just as Lily arrives and orders Serena to proceed to the brunch.

Dragging Dan along, Serena goes to the brunch, infuriating Blair with her presence. Nate surreptitiously gives Serena a key to Chuck's suite so that the two can talk out from under the watchful eyes of Blair; Chuck gives Blair an identical key, telling her to grab Nate and "seal the deal." Blair and Nate, already in action, tumble into the suite only to be greeted by Serena. Blair flips out, and runs to find Dan to tell him about Serena's past. Meanwhile, as Dan steps outside, he sees Lily and Bart discussing their relationship; Lily catches sight of Dan and admonishes him, demanding that he tell no one what he overheard.

Blair finally catches up with Dan, which led to Serena coming clean to her date. A disappointed Dan is further enraged when Chuck insults Jenny, and throws a second punch at the would-be rapist. Serena tries to explain herself to Dan, but he leaves the brunch without her.

Back at the Humphrey apartment, Dan relates to Rufus and Jenny that he "...found Serena, but then [he] lost her." Blair and Nate make up yet again, and Jenny tries out her new dress as Serena throws away her cellphone that contained pictures of her, Blair, Chuck and Nate.

== Reception ==
The episode received significantly lower ratings as compared to "Pilot" due to strong competition from other networks for the night. It garnered a 1.8/3 rating/share, with a total of 2.55 million watching it.

The episode was criticized for having a less-than believable storyline (such as there were no waiters during the brunch), but was seen as trying to be "responsible" when it did not show teenagers smoking, although it showed alcohol and sex. People also noticed that the series is "giving you major dramarama payoff in only its second week on the air" and that wasn't even "the episode's biggest angst–y moment."

New York magazine approved that "there's no such thing as 'lunch' on the weekends", "that kids actually do venture outside of their neighborhoods" (since The New York Palace Hotel is in Midtown Manhattan), and "saying you live in Williamsburg makes much more sense... for real-estate emotional conflict", plus the fact Rihanna is played "in every situation." However, things such as Blair's unreal wardrobe choices while at home, the high number of trees, and teens, in Williamsburg, and "every single thing that happened involving the plot" are disapproved.

In the United Kingdom, where the show is also aired on ITV2, the show was met with good feedback, being dubbed "the new O.C.". Tabloid critics said that the show was "scandalous." and "...perfect for those lovers of The O.C.".
