= Valley Girls =

- Gossip Girl episode
- Promotional poster
- Episode no.: Season 2 Episode 24
- Directed by: Mark Piznarski
- Written by: Stephanie Savage; Josh Schwartz
- Original air date: May 11, 2009

Guest appearances
- Brittany Snow as Lillian "Lily" Rhodes (flashbacks); Krysten Ritter as Carol Rhodes; Matt Barr as Keith van der Woodsen; Andrew McCarthy as Rick Rhodes; Shiloh Fernandez as Owen Campos; Ryan Hansen as Shep; Caroline Lagerfelt as Celia "CeCe" Rhodes; Connor Paolo as Eric van der Woodsen; Cynthia Watros as CeCe Rhodes (flashbacks); Yin Chang as Nelly Yuki; Nicole Fiscella as Isabel Coates; Abby Pivaronas as Veronica; Amanda Setton as Penelope Shafai; Zuzanna Szadkowski as Dorota Kishlovsky; Dreama Walker as Hazel Williams

Episode chronology
← Previous "The Wrath of Con"	Next → "The Goodbye Gossip Girl"
- Gossip Girl season 2

"Valley Girls" is the twenty-fourth episode of the second season of The CW television series Gossip Girl. The episode served as a backdoor pilot for a potential Gossip Girl spin-off series set in the 1980s, entitled Valley Girls. The episode was directed by Mark Piznarski and written by Josh Schwartz and Stephanie Savage (this was the first episode of the series since "Much 'I Do' About Nothing" to be co-written by Schwartz). It was filmed on location in New York City, New York and in Los Angeles, California. References to elements of 1980s popular culture were heavily accentuated in the episode, which the producers hoped would bridge the generation gap between the characters and audience. "Valley Girls" aired on the CW in the United States on May 11, 2009 and was viewed live by an audience of 2.31 million Americans. Although the episode received generally positive reviews, the spin-off series was not picked up.

"Valley Girls" provides insight on the mysterious past of character Lily van der Woodsen (played by Kelly Rutherford as an adult and Brittany Snow as a teenager) through a series of flashbacks to her life as a teenager in the 80s. After getting kicked out of boarding school, Lily runs away from her wealthy parents to live in the San Fernando Valley with her sister Carol Rhodes (Krysten Ritter), the black sheep of the family. In the present, Lily's daughter Serena van der Woodsen (Blake Lively) rebels against her mother and decides to stay in jail as a statement, while her classmates prepare for the Prom. The episode introduces the main cast of Valley Girls as guest actors.

== Plot summary ==
To prove she is able to handle her own affairs, Serena refuses to leave jail with either Lily or CeCe (Caroline Lagerfelt) although Lily drops the charges on which she had Serena arrested. Rufus (Matthew Settle) is also angry with Lily for Serena's arrest; Dan (Penn Badgley) and Jenny (Taylor Momsen) inform Vanessa (Jessica Szohr) that Rufus returned home without proposing to Lily, and he has remained in his bedroom ever since. Lily feuds with CeCe for telling Rufus about their lovechild. From jail, Serena encourages Blair (Leighton Meester) to enjoy prom with Nate (Chace Crawford) in the way Blair had chronicled in a scrapbook as a preteen, but each of the couple's prom plans, such as the limo, hotel reservation and Blair's dress, inexplicably go awry. Nate suspects Chuck (Ed Westwick) of sabotaging the prom in an effort to win Blair back, but Chuck denies involvement. Dan convinces Serena to allow him to pay her bail and escort her to the Prom.

At the Prom, Chuck foils a plot by Penelope (Amanda Setton), Hazel (Dreama Walker), Isabel (Nicole Fiscella), and Nelly Yuki (Yin Chang) to humiliate Blair during Prom royalty elections. Chuck admits to Serena and Dan that he has secretly been altering Nate and Blair's Prom night in order to recreate the scenes from Blair's Prom scrapbook. Meanwhile, Blair feels disconcerted while dancing with Nate and ends their relationship by the end of the night. Blair explains to Serena that after completing high school with Nate, he feels like simply a high school boyfriend. The girls reminisce about growing up together through crazy times, like sisters. Lily apologizes to Rufus and CeCe. Rufus expresses concern that Lily is too unpredictable and too much like her mother. CeCe remains indifferent, but agrees to return to Lily's home.

Throughout the episode, dialogue and objects prompt Lily to recall the events of her own first arrest. During flashbacks, a seventeen-year-old Lily Rhodes (Brittany Snow), having deliberately gotten expelled from The Thacher School in Ojai, California travels to Malibu, California to meet with her father, Rick Rhodes (Andrew McCarthy), the wealthy owner of Rhodes Records. Sadly for Lily, Rick already phoned her mother CeCe, who drove to Malibu from Montecito to deal with Lily. When Rick rejects the idea of Lily living with him in Malibu, Lily decides to find her sister Carol (Krysten Ritter) rather than move in with CeCe, whom Lily detests. Carol, an aspiring actress, had rejected the Rhode's upscale life and moved a year earlier to the San Fernando Valley. While searching for Carol, Lily meets Owen Campos (Shiloh Fernandez), who takes her to a club where they find Shep, Owen's musician friend, and Carol. Carol and Shep are in the midst of a dispute with Keith van der Woodsen (Matt Barr), the rich, antagonistic director of Shep's music video in which Carol stars, and are headed to his party to confront him for raising his price and holding the video hostage. When Lily asks why Carol does not simply use their father's company, Carol insists she does not want anyone to know of their privileged background. When the antagonism escalates to a fight at the party, security arrests Owen and Lily although Carol and Shep manage to escape. From jail, Lily calls CeCe. CeCe calls her daughters irresponsible. Carol, who has come to pay Lily's bail, overhears Lily defend Carol's lifestyle. Carol takes the phone from Lily, informs CeCe that Lily will be moving in with her, and takes Lily back to the city.

== Production ==
"Valley Girls" doubles as both a Gossip Girl episode and the pilot episode of Valley Girls, a possible Gossip Girl prequel. The spin-off television series would chronicle the life of Lily Rhodes while attending high school and living with Carol in 1980s Los Angeles.

Discussion about a Gossip Girl spin-off began in 2008. Despite believing the project was "unlikely," Gossip Girl executives explored potential concepts including an adaptation of the Gossip Girl book series' spin-off, The It Girl. However, they felt that The It Girl's world, centered on character Jenny Humphrey's stay at boarding school, was too small and insular to sustain a television series. They were also concerned about disrupting Gossip Girl's chemistry by taking away any of the show's cast members. In December 2009, Variety magazine reported that while the "Gossip Girl spinoff [was] still in the very early stages of development", CW had begun to consider making a backdoor pilot. Such a pilot would allow the company to evaluate viewer interest in a spin-off while saving money.

On January 14, 2009, CW green-lit a backdoor pilot for an untitled spin-off series starring a young Lily van der Woodsen. The concept was based on an original idea by Gossip Girl producers Schwartz and Savage. The pilot episode, eventually named "Valley Girls", was written by Stephanie Savage and Josh Schwartz and directed by Mark Piznarski, all of whom had previously worked the same roles for the Gossip Girl pilot. "Valley Girls" was shot on location in New York City, New York and in Los Angeles, California beginning in February 2009. Flashbacks were set apart from present day scenes through a grainy, sepia tone. A scene in which Lily conceives and carries out an "elaborate plan to kiss a boy, and then lie about it" in order to violate her school's honor code and be expelled, was cut from the final episode. "Valley Girls" aired on May 11, 2009.

=== Casting ===
On February 5, 2009, Krysten Ritter became the first guest star to be officially cast for the Valley Girls pilot. Brittany Snow was the producers' top choice for young Lily Rhodes and was offered the role in early February 2009 without auditioning. Initially, the series' producers wanted to cast an undiscovered star in the role while Snow was interested in continuing her film career. However, after viewing a reel featuring Snow's work ranging from Hairspray to Nip/Tuck, Savage and Schwartz found her "perfect" and "pulled out all the stops" to convince her to come back to TV. Ryan Hansen had previously starred as "Douche" on Schwartz's web series Rockville CA. Schwartz deemed Hansen's performance there "so unlikable in such a likable way, that we cast him on the Gossip Girl spin-off." On March 6, 2009, Entertainment Weekly reported that Cynthia Watros and Andrew McCarthy were in final talks to join the show as Lily's parents, thereby filling Valley Girls' last starring roles.

=== Fashion and music ===
When asked what was being done to make modern day audiences comfortable with 1980s American culture, Schwartz replied,

If you never lived through that era — like most of our "Gossip Girl" audience didn't — there is a fascination, like we were fascinated by the '70s. My sense ... is that their connection to that era is via Michael Jackson, Madonna — those broader pop culture references. Fashion-driven, especially. So there's an appetite there, they want to go deeper into that era. ... In the same way New York is a character on "Gossip Girl," the '80s will be a character on Valley Girls.

The producers worked to incorporate 1980s fashion into the show in a way that "felt fun, definitely, but also grounded in a reality where [they] could tell dramatic stories." The styles featured were therefore constructed so that viewers would not be distracted from an emotional scene by characters wearing 1980s makeup, hairstyles, or shoulder pads. In addition, show makers wanted to make the series feel "like something that you'd want to be a part of, rather than make fun of", and that young women would be inspired by the clothing styles featured in the spin-off as well as on Gossip Girl. During flashbacks in "Valley Girls", Lily dresses in two styles of clothing. She appears in a preppy, upper-crust riding outfit while associating with her rich parents, but changes into a dress more typical of the "underground punk-rock scene" after running away to the San Fernando Valley. Snow describes her hairstyle as "a little teased, feathered like Farrah Fawcett with curly bangs like Brooke Shields." In present-day scenes, Blair and Serena both attend Prom in designer dresses; Blair dons a black and gold gown from the Marchesa Spring 2008 collection, while Serena wears a pink halter dress from the Christian Dior Spring 2009 collection. Belinda Goldsmith of Reuters cited the episode's Prom scene as an example of the media's glamorization of U.S. formal dances, which she says has caused the cost of formal dances around the world to rise.

No Doubt guest stars as fictional 80s band "Snowed Out"

Songs featured within "Valley Girls" were taken from both the Los Angeles punk rock scene and mainstream 1980s hits in order to represent the two worlds surrounding character Lily Rhodes. "Jumping between these two worlds is important to the show. Lily is living with her sister in the Valley and kind of hanging out in the punk rock scene, but she and her sister come from a wealthy family and their parents are more aligned with a Pacific Palisades/Beverly Hills/Malibu, Less than Zero world. So her struggle ... is to try and figure out what kind of world she wants to be in", says Savage. Music supervisor Alexandra Patsavas oversaw music selection for the episode. With the exception of Fountains of Wayne's "Prom Theme" (1999), every song featured within "Valley Girls" was released prior to or in 1983, the year in which Lily's flashbacks take place. Savage explains that the show makers hoped to introduce modern audiences to bands and music they had not known before. No Doubt makes an uncredited guest appearance during the episode as a fictional band called "Snowed Out", a play on words of "No Doubt". During the cameo, part of the band's return to music after a four-year hiatus, No Doubt premiered their cover of Adam and the Ants' "Stand and Deliver", the band's first new song in five years. The band performs in the Sunset Strip club where Lily meets Carol for the first time in a year.

=== Pick-up ===
Literally every pilot we shot this year could have made the schedule this year ... It was just a matter of where would it fit on our schedule ... Honestly, it's just what did we feel we had the best opportunity to kind of break out with.

— Dawn Ostroff, CW President of Entertainment

Rumors that the spin-off would not be picked up as a series began well before the pilot premiered due to the limited number of spots available on CW's fall line-up. Seven CW series were renewed for another season, leaving three spots open for pick-ups. "Valley Girls" competed against pilots for several other promising shows. On May 7, 2009, Nikki Finke wrote on her blog, Deadline Hollywood, that despite enthusiasm of CW executives, "the show went from hot, to lukewarm, to 'fading but wouldn't count out', to now dead, according to my insiders." CW eventually chose to pick up Melrose Place, The Beautiful Life, and The Vampire Diaries.

However, on May 21, 2009, the day CW's fall schedule was formally announced, CW President of Entertainment Dawn Ostroff told reporters at a CW upfront that Valley Girls was still in contention for use as a midseason replacement. Said Ostroff,

It was the toughest year we've ever had, figuring out what to pick up, because [our pilots] were all really, really good. We do have room for another midseason show. We have some reality, and we'll probably have another scripted drama. We're just going to take a beat and see where we are. In all honesty, I think the Gossip Girl spinoff is the show that we would love to be able to find a place for as the season goes on.

During a television press tour on August 4, 2009, when Ostroff was asked if the series would ever be green-lit, she said, "Not right now." She explained that she believed using "Valley Girls" episode as a backdoor pilot "instead of doing a full pilot" put the potential series at a disadvantage because "it was hard for everybody to understand what the world would be like on its own." However, she stated that if Schwartz and Savage were interested in creating a different Gossip Girl spin-off, CW would "of course ... be open to it."

== Reception ==
"Valley Girls" received generally positive comments from reviewers. TV Guide's Jennifer Sankowski enjoyed the episode and believed the producers had captured all aspects of popular 1980s teen culture well, but that "at times it felt like they were trying too hard, throwing everything and anything '80s at us" such as a montage of 1980s outfits worn by Lily and mentions of MTV videos, fanny packs, Rubik's Cube, and Jane Fonda workout videos. "At this rate," said Sankowski, "they won't have anything left to showcase." Tim Stack of Entertainment Weekly "loved" the episode and complimented the casting choices, but agrees with Sankowski in that "if this ends up being an actual series, they need to dial down the '80s references a tad." Kona Gallagher of Cinema Blend said the premise was interesting and that "[Valley Girls] has the potential to be a strong spinoff, and [she] hope[s] that CW decides to pick it up this fall." Dave Itzkoff of The New York Times writes that he "especially liked the moxie of Brittany Snow as young Lily and Krysten Ritter ... as her sister, Carol. And of course the retro soundtrack was a total trip." A few review sites took issue with the episode's script, such as BuddyTV, which claimed it was cliché, and Television Without Pity, which found it repetitive. While writing for The Frisky, Sara Benincasa praised the clothing styles and called the overall episode "awesome fun! ... weirdly sentimental, and sweet". She also believed that the confrontation between the Valley dwellers and the rich attendees of Keith's party was "clearly a giant, dance-friendly metaphor for Reaganomics and the woes of a trickle-down world." Michelle Graham for Film School Rejects liked both the 1980s and present day scenes separately, but when put together, "the overall effect was disjointed and showed it for what it was: an attempt to shove two shows together in order to save money on a proper pilot."

"Valley Girls" was viewed live by a relatively small audience of 2.31 million in the United States according to Nielsen Media Research. However, Schwartz notes that "Gossip Girl became the first show that indicated that the way people watch television is changing. You can go on iTunes, every episode is No. 1, ahead of all these bigger shows. The streams are high, the DVR time-shifting number was something like 40%. There's a much bigger audience for the show than the (Nielsen) numbers might indicate."

== See also ==
- Gossip Girl (season 2)
