= Much 'I Do' About Nothing =

- Gossip Girl episode
- Promotional poster
- Episode no.: Season 1 Episode 18
- Directed by: Norman Buckley
- Written by: Josh Schwartz; Stephanie Savage
- Production code: 3T6767
- Original air date: May 19, 2008

Guest appearances
- Robert John Burke as Bart Bass; Connor Paolo as Eric van der Woodsen; Sam Robards as Howard Archibald; Michelle Trachtenberg as Georgina Sparks; Candy Buckley as Mrs. Sparks; Mark La Mura as Mr. Sparks; Lydia Hearst as Amelia

Episode chronology
← Previous "Woman on the Verge"	Next → "Summer, Kind of Wonderful"
- Gossip Girl season 1

"Much 'I Do' About Nothing" is the 18th and final episode of the first season of the American teen drama television series Gossip Girl. The episode was written by Josh Schwartz and Stephanie Savage and directed by Norman Buckley. It originally aired on The CW in the United States on May 19, 2008.

== Plot ==
Blair takes matters into her own hands to help Serena deal with the manipulative and evil Georgina Sparks who threatens to expose Serena's secret. Lily, while keeping Rufus in her mind, prepares for her wedding with Bart Bass that is designed to be the Upper East Side's social event of the year. Serena finally tells Dan the whole truth about her past and about Georgina and they try to work things out. But Dan is guilt-ridden after having cheated on Serena with Georgina and wonders if it is already too late. An unexpected guest shows up at Lily and Bart's wedding. Also Blair manipulates matters so that Georgina goes "somewhere where she can do no harm". As the end of the school year approaches, Blair plans to go somewhere with Chuck.

== Production ==
=== Fashion ===
For the wedding during the first season finale, Gossip Girl costume designer Eric Daman dressed Blake Lively in a yellow floral bridesmaid dress designed by Ralph Lauren while Kelly Rutherford wore a custom-made Vera Wang wedding dress. Eric Daman considers Serena's Ralph Lauren bridesmaid dress as one of his eleven favorite looks from the series in a September interview for New York Magazine.

== International Titles ==
- Czech Republic: Mnoho povyku pro nic (Much Ado About Nothing)
- Germany: Abschied (Farewell)

== Cultural Allusions ==
- Georgina Sparks is supposed to be a part of the equestrian circuit, mentions having lasted longer than Lohan in rehab, and sold her show horse for money to buy cocaine.
- When Dan and Blair are calling Georgina, you can see a painting behind them with the name "XOXO". When Georgina calls Dan back, the inscription has disappeared.
- When Bart speaks with Lily regarding her relationship with Rufus, the building he mentions to be his first project is 105 Chambers Street, the address of the real-life New York Newspaper, The New York Sun.
- Rufus mentions his band Lincoln Hawk replacing alternative rock band Luscious Jackson for a concert tour.
- Blair is seen taking the Bass helicopter on her way to Teterboro.

== Reception ==
"Much 'I Do' About Nothing" was watched by 3.00 million viewers, a series high since the pilot.
