= Pilot (Gossip Girl) =

- Gossip Girl episode
- Serena returns to New York City from boarding school.
- Episode no.: Season 1 Episode 1
- Directed by: Mark Piznarski
- Teleplay by: Josh Schwartz; Stephanie Savage
- Cinematography by: Ron Fortunato
- Editing by: Timothy A. Good
- Production code: 276026
- Original air date: September 19, 2007
- Running time: 42 minutes

Guest appearances
- Sam Robards as Howard Archibald; Florencia Lozano as Eleanor Waldorf; Connor Paolo as Eric van der Woodsen; Nicole Fiscella as Isabel Coates; Nan Zhang as Katia "Kati" Farkas; Kimberly Hébert Gregory as nurse; Andrew Stewart-Jones as concierge; Lindsey Broad as girl who takes photo; Robert Stoeckle as high society man

Episode chronology
← Previous —	Next → "The Wild Brunch"
- Gossip Girl season 1

"Pilot" is the pilot episode of the American teen drama television series Gossip Girl. The episode was written by Josh Schwartz and Stephanie Savage and directed by Mark Piznarski. It premiered on September 19, 2007, on The CW in the United States.

== Plot ==
Serena van der Woodsen's (Blake Lively) mysterious return to Manhattan's Upper East Side after a year-long stint at a boarding school in Connecticut becomes the talk of the town when the news of her homecoming is announced on a popular blog run by an unseen character using the screen name "Gossip Girl" (voiced by Kristen Bell). Serena's best friend, Blair Waldorf (Leighton Meester), however, is less than thrilled to see her again, especially when her plans of losing her virginity to her boyfriend, Nate Archibald (Chace Crawford), are interrupted when Serena arrives unexpectedly at a party.

Serena and Blair have a heart-to-heart and rekindle their friendship. After Blair leaves, Chuck Bass (Ed Westwick) appears and lures Serena into the bar's kitchen, where he attempts to rape her. Blair and Serena's re-ignited friendship is short-lived when Nate confesses to her that he and Serena slept together the night before she left, and although Blair forgives Nate, she refuses to forgive Serena.

Outsider Dan Humphrey (Penn Badgley) who has a secret crush on Serena, which dates back even before her mysterious departure, is once again drawn to her as soon as he learns that she has arrived back in town and, after trying to return Serena's phone to her, she asks him out on a date simply as an excuse not to go to Blair's "Kiss on the Lips" party. Dan takes Serena to his dad's band's concert, but they are forced to leave when his younger sister Jenny (Taylor Momsen) sends him a text message from Blair's party asking for help. Dan and Serena turn heads as they burst in on the party and search frantically for Jenny. They find her on the roof, where an egotistical predator Chuck is attempting to rape her. Dan punches Chuck and he and Serena leave in disgust, hand-in-hand with Jenny tagging along.

The apparent reason for Serena's abrupt return is revealed to be her younger brother Eric (Connor Paolo), who unsuccessfully tried to commit suicide but is now living in a psychiatric institution.

In addition, the past affair between Dan and Jenny's father Rufus (Matthew Settle) and Serena and Eric's mother is brought to light when Lily (Kelly Rutherford) asks Rufus whether he is using his son to get close to her again.

== Production ==
=== Casting ===
Featuring nine regular speaking roles, the majority of the ensemble cast were assembled from February to April 2007. Blake Lively and Leighton Meester were the first two actresses to be chosen in February for the lead roles of Serena van der Woodsen and Blair Waldorf respectively. Penn Badgley, Taylor Momsen, Chace Crawford, Kelly Rutherford, Connor Paolo and Florencia Lozano also auditioned successfully and landed roles in the series in March. Actors for the roles of Chuck Bass and Rufus Humphrey were found in April when Ed Westwick and Matthew Settle were cast. As rumors swirled about the impending cancellation of Veronica Mars, it was revealed at The CW's 2007 Upfronts on May 17, 2007, that Kristen Bell had narrated the pilot, thus making her the title character of another show on the network.

=== Costume and design ===
With the premiere of the fourth season, New York magazine interviewed Gossip Girl costume designer Eric Daman, who cited Serena's French striped t-shirt, leather jacket, and attire in the Pilot opening as one of Serena's most iconic outfits and one of his eleven favorite looks from the series. Entertainment Weekly's Meeta Agrawal places Blake Lively's Serena van der Woodsen amongst the wearers of the 20 Knockout Dresses of the 2000s. Her Tory Burch designed dress that she wore while she waited for Dan at The New York Palace Hotel marble staircase earned her the second spot on the list.

== Cultural allusions ==
- Chuck suggests that Nate uses his father's viagra.
- Serena reminds Blair that they used to dance on tables at Bungalow 8.
- When talking to Nate, Chuck uses the phrase "Talk to Chuck", a marketing campaign for the Charles Schwab Corporation.
- During Serena's attempt to rebuild her friendship with Blair, the two are seen drinking at Gilt, the hotel bar of the New York Palace.
- A flashback shows Serena and Nate having sex on the bar of the empty Campbell Apartment.

== Featured music ==
The following is a list of songs featured in "Pilot".

- "Young Folks" by Peter Bjorn and John featuring Victoria Bergsman
- "If It's Lovin' that You Want – Part 2" by Rihanna featuring Cory Gunz
- "What Goes Around... Comes Around" by Justin Timberlake
- "Diamond Hipster Boy" by Washington Social Club
- Concerto for Strings and Harpsichord in G Major by Antonio
- "99%" by The Mooney Suzuki
- "Bounce with Me" by Kreesha Turner
- "Back to Black" by Amy Winehouse
- "Space for Rent" by WhoMadeWho
- "Send You Back" by Matthew Dear
- "Photograph" by Air
- "Joyful Waltz" by Zdeněk Barták
- "Hang Me Up to Dry" by Cold War Kids
- "Time Won't Let Me Go" by The Bravery
- "Hard to Live in the City" by Albert Hammond Jr.
- "The Way I Are" by Timbaland featuring Keri Hilson and D.O.E.
- "Go" by Hanson
- "Don't Matter" by Akon
- "Knock Knock" by Lyrics Born
- "The Gift" by Angels & Airwaves

== Reception ==
"Pilot" was the first television pilot of the fall 2007 season to be picked up by its network. "Pilot" had lukewarm ratings overall, but performed well in key demographics and is one of the most buzzed about new shows on the internet. Its digital video recorder ratings were high, increasing the show's profitability. The show has also been in the top five of iTunes sales. Scott D. Pierce of the Deseret Morning News noted that Gossip Girl is milder than a lot of what's shown on MTV, but still warned parents of several scenes in the pilot. He said it includes "among other things, a teenage girl climbing on top of a boy and removing his clothes; drunken teens having sex; teens smoking pot; teens drinking in bars, in a limo and at a party; a teen boy getting amorous with a girl who fights him off; and that same teen boy essentially attempting to rape a freshman girl who is supposed to be, what, 14?". In the United Kingdom Gossip Girl scored an average of 520,000 viewers on ITV2. The pilot is the second highest-rated episode in the series (proceeding "The Dark Night" with 3.73), pulling a 3.50. Vogue included the episode on its list of the 20 best episodes in the series.
