= Andrew Stewart-Jones =

American actor

Andrew Stewart-Jones is an English actor, best-known for playing the role of Crispus Allen in Gotham.

== Career ==
Stewart-Jones first came on to the television scene in 2003 in HBO's Sex and the City as Jules. Next he guest starred in 2005 in NBC's Third Watch. In 2006, Stewart-Jones guest starred on Fox's The Wedding Album pilot episode. Also in 2006, he guest starred on One Life to Live in a 4 episode arc as an airline pilot.

In 2007, Stewart-Jones began his film career with Montclair and The Girl in the Park. Next Stewart-Jones guest starred on The CW's Gossip Girl in the pilot episode and the second episode. Stewart-Jones has guest starred on NBC's Law & Order, 30 Rock, and Mercy.

He guest starred on ABC's Castle in 2009. Stewart-Jones had minor roles in 2009's It's Complicated and The Good Guy.

Stewart-Jones has guest starred on Person of Interest, Unforgettable, The Good Wife, the short-lived Golden Boy, and Blue Bloods. He had a minor role in 2011's Mr. Popper's Penguins.

In 2013, Stewart-Jones guest starred in the pilot episode of The CW's The Tomorrow People. He next was in 2013's Dead Man Down. In 2014, Stewart-Jones landed the role of Crispus Allen in Fox's Gotham as a guest star in the pilot episode. He would be bumped up to a starring role as Crispus Allen in the second episode. In August 2015, it was reported that Stewart-Jones would not be returning as a member of the main cast for season two.

Stewart-Jones has done theatre work. He was in 2005's Guantanamo: Honor Bound to Defend Freedom as Jamal al-Harith.

Stewart-Jones starred in 2013's Good Television as Ethan Taumer. In 2008, Stewart lent his voice to Midnight Club: Los Angeles as Martin.

== Filmography ==
=== Film ===
Year	Title	Role	Notes
2007	Montclair	Policeman No. 1	
2007	The Girl in the Park	Guy with Louise	
2009	The Good Guy	Shakespeare	
2009	It's Complicated	Restaurant Host	
2011	Mr. Popper's Penguins	Animal Control Guy	
2013	Dead Man Down	Harry	
2023	Founders Day	Thomas Chambers	
2025	V13	Carl Jung	

=== Television ===
Year	Title	Role	Notes
2003	Sex and the City	Jules	3 episodes
2005	Third Watch	Gang Leader No. 1	Episode: "In the Family Way (part 1)" (S 6:Ep 16)
2006	The Wedding Album	Bartender	Episode: "Pilot" (S 1:Ep 1)
2006	One Life to Live	Airline Pilot	4 episodes
2007	Gossip Girl	Concierge	Episodes: "Pilot" (S 1: Ep 1); "The Wild Brunch" (S 1:Ep 2)
2008	Law & Order	Devon	Episode: "Zero" (S 19:Ep 7)
2009	Castle	Bartender	1 episode
2009	30 Rock	Gabe	Episode: "The Ones" (S 3:Ep 19)
2010	Mercy	Holmes	1 episode
2011	Person of Interest	Doyle	Episode: "Pilot" (S 1:Ep 1)
2012	Unforgettable	Ken Coleman	Episode: "The Comeback" (S 1:Ep 18)
2012	The Good Wife	Tom Gill	Episode: "Anatomy of a Joke" (S 4:Ep 7)
2013	Golden Boy	Tyler Neville	Episode: "Scapegoat" (S 1:Ep 8)
2013	The Tomorrow People	Damien	Episode: "Pilot" (S 1 :Ep 1)
2013	Blue Bloods	Officer Kamins	Episode: "Mistaken Identity" (S 4:Ep 10)
2014	Gotham	Crispus Allen	Guest star (S 1:Ep 1); Main cast
2016	Beauty and the Beast	Deputy Secretary Hill	5 episodes
2016	The Night Of	Coach Harris	2 episodes
2016	The Blacklist	Krantz	Episode: "Gaia (No. 81)" (S 4:Ep 4)
2017	Bull	Garrett	Episode: "Free Fall" (S 1:Ep 16)

=== Video games ===
Year	Title	Role	Notes
2008	Midnight Club: Los Angeles	Martin	

== Stage performances ==
Year	Title	Role	Notes
2005	Guantanamo: Honor Bound to Defend Freedom	Jamal al-Harith	
2013	Good Television	Ethan Taumer	
