= A Thin Line Between Chuck and Nate =

- Gossip Girl episode
- Serena convinces Blair to stay.
- Episode no.: Season 1 Episode 13
- Directed by: Norman Buckley
- Written by: Felicia D. Henderson
- Production code: 3T6762
- Original air date: January 9, 2008

Guest appearances
- Connor Paolo as Eric van der Woodsen; Margaret Colin as Eleanor Waldorf; Zuzanna Szadkowski as Dorota Kishlovsky; Nan Zhang as Kati Farkas; Nicole Fiscella as Isabel Coates; Dreama Walker as Hazel Williams; Amanda Setton as Penelope Shafai; Jan Maxwell as Headmistress Queller; Emma Demmar as Elise Wells; Jill Flint as Bex; Veronica Taylor as Bryn

Episode chronology
← Previous "School Lies"	Next → "The Blair Bitch Project"
- Gossip Girl season 1

"A Thin Line Between Chuck and Nate" is the 13th episode of the CW television series, Gossip Girl. The episode was written by Felicia D. Henderson and directed by Norman Buckley. It originally aired on Wednesday, January 9, 2008, on the CW.

== Plot ==
After Gossip Girl posts a picture of Serena looking at pregnancy tests, everyone thinks that she must be pregnant. Jenny, Dan, and Rufus see the news online, and Dan worries about the right thing to say. After hearing about the Gossip Girl blast while with Eric, Serena runs into a frazzled Dan who blurts out that he loves her. Serena tells him that she is not pregnant, and goes to find Blair. It is revealed that Serena bought the test for her because Blair mentioned that her period was late. Blair refuses to take the test since everything is going so well in her life, including her reinforced relationship with Nate. Dan tells Rufus about what happened between him and Serena, and he says that it's a good thing it was just a scare, because they need to take some time and slow down. Jenny tells Dan that if he really does love Serena, he should tell her again in a more personal way.

While having dinner together in the Humphrey's apartment, Serena tells Dan everything about Blair's current situation. Dan explains that even though Chuck is a jerk, he deserves to know about what's going on. Serena later visits Chuck at his hotel room, who informs her that Nate and Blair have already slept together. She confronts Blair over her dishonesty, making a point by saying she took a public bullet getting the test for her. Eleanor expresses concern over Blair's recent attitude fearing that her bulimia may have resurfaced. Blair finally takes the test, and calls Serena to happily tell her she isn't pregnant. At school, Chuck tries to threaten her about exposing their tryst to Nate, to which Blair replies that he would never tell Nate since that would ruin their friendship, and that she no longer wants to be a part of his games. Chuck then sends a blast to Gossip Girl about Serena covering for Blair because "her sheets got rumpled by two guys in the same week".

Meanwhile, Dan attempts to say a proper "I love you" by having a romantic picnic in the park, only to get derailed when Serena's English paper gets blown away. Everyone see the news about Blair when school lets out. Nate initially believes that it must be a lie, but Jenny, who overheard Serena's conversation with Dan the previous night, tells him the truth. Nate gets into a fight with Chuck over the whole thing, then tells Blair he wants nothing to do with her. She is quickly overthrown as the queen bee, with Jenny joining the popular group. Serena asks Dan if he told Jenny anything relating to Blair, so he says he wouldn't do something like that to her because he loves her.

Confused over what to believe, Serena confides in Eric about whether or not to trust Dan. He explains that there were times where he listened to her conversations without knowing, and that she is apprehensive over Dan's "I love you" because of their mother's history with men. Blair is then shown going to see Chuck at a bar. She explains that he is the only person that wants to be around her now, and Chuck replies that he is no longer interested in her. Overcome by her recent troubles, Blair begs her mother to let her spend a semester in France. Serena goes to see Dan, and they both finally profess their love to each other. But their happiness is cut short when Serena discovers that Blair is going away. She races to see Blair before she gets on the plane, and convinces her to stay and fight for her life.

== Reception ==
"I’ve been lobbying for the show to use the GG gimmick as more than just a cute framing device or a running commentary on events that need no further embellishment. Tonight, the GG blog set off the daisy-chain of misunderstandings and back-biting that kept the episode percolating, and finally demonstrated how the rumor mill can upend people’s personal lives. Whether the rumors are true or not doesn’t really matter."

—Scott Tobias praising the utilization of the Gossip Girl blog.

"A Thin Line Between Chuck and Nate" was watched by 2.27 million viewers and received positive reviews from critics. New York Magazine praised the episode following the show's return from the Writer's Strike and the use of Gossip Girl to elevate the episode. "We were concerned after last week's episode that Gossip Girl was embarking on a downward spiral, that the writers' strike would cause it to slink off the air like a disgraced social climber, [...] Every time we find ourselves doubting or mistrustful of our lover, he or she surprises us, we are proven wrong, and we fall in "love" all over again. As the great writer Jessica Fletcher once said, what does not kill us makes us stronger. And this week's season finale had us feeling strong indeed! [...] it was the first to play up the role of Gossip Girl herself and her effect on the character's lives." Scott Tobias of The A.V. Club lauded the development of the Blair/Nate/Chuck triangle, "[...]one, it adds another layer to the big revelation that she lost her virginity to Chuck before losing her fake virginity to Nate. It would have been hard enough to deal with the truth about who's sleeping with whom, but adding a paternity test to the mix kicks it up several notches. For two, we get to see Blair's swift and stunning fall from grace after Chuck decides to finally play his hand on the Gossip Girl site."

Chris Rovzar from New York Magazine praised the panic that the pregnancy storyline caused. "To be fair, Blair's sleeping with Chuck after getting dumped was kind of understandable. But it's so real that no one would see it that way." Tobias commended the writers' shifting the storyline from Serena to Blair. "[...]surely none of you believed that Serena was buying the test for herself, did you? The writers do a fine enough job covering up this little twist, but it’s impossible to believe that she and Dan would have unprotected sex." On reviewing the episode, Tobias praised the pregnancy scare storyline for Blair, calling it a "masterstroke" and noted the commonality of the rules of 19th century New York high society and the rules of high school hierarchy in the show. "The moment Blair is tarred as a harlot, her adoring underlings turn on her like a pack of hyenas; it’s strange to think that Blair’s pristine sexuality was somehow the root of her power [...] but in this world, it makes sense. Sleeping with two guys in quick succession (particularly Chuck, who isn’t “special” like Nate) is a show of weakness, and she fast discovers that her loyal subjects do not respect vulnerability from their leader." Tobias expected the return of a vengeful Blair. "Blair will have to dig pretty hard to hurt Chuck as badly as he did with that “Arabian horses” speech. Can't wait for her Medea phase to begin."

Tobias praised the direction of Jenny Humphrey from her role in bringing down Blair to being given an elevated storyline. "I’ve been waiting for Jenny to play a more integral role than luring her boring mother back into the Humphrey household."
