= All About My Brother =

- Gossip Girl episode
- Episode no.: Season 1 Episode 16
- Directed by: Janice Cooke-Leonard
- Written by: Paul Sciarrotta
- Cinematography by: Ron Fortunato
- Editing by: Harry Jierjian
- Production code: 3T6765
- Original air date: May 5, 2008
- Running time: 42 minutes

Guest appearances
- Connor Paolo as Eric van der Woodsen; Michelle Trachtenberg as Georgina Sparks; Yin Chang as Nelly Yuki; Emma Demar as Elise Wells; Nicole Fiscella as Isabel Coates; Amanda Setton as Penelope Shafai; Jesse Swenson as Asher Hornsby; Dreama Walker as Hazel Williams

Episode chronology
← Previous "Desperately Seeking Serena"	Next → "Woman on the Verge"
- Gossip Girl season 1

"All About My Brother" is the 16th episode of the first season of the American teen drama television series Gossip Girl. It originally aired on The CW on May 5, 2008. The episode was written by Paul Sciarrotta and directed by Janice Cooke-Leonard.

== International titles ==
- Czech Republic: "Vše o mém bratrovi" ("All About My Brother")

== Cultural allusions ==
- Jenny is seen using Evite to invite everyone to her party.
- After publicly humiliating Jenny and Asher, Blair's clique ask her where they're going to celebrate and mentions a Waverly restaurant and the Lower East Side bar, 151.
- When Lily discusses seating arrangements for her wedding, she requests a waiter to have Serena seated far away from former New York governor, Eliot Spitzer.
- Penelope compares Gossip Girl to Page Six when the blog halts its acceptance of gossip involving Blair and Jenny.
- Hazel compares Jenny to Vanessa Hudgens while Blair compares Jenny to Katie Holmes when a rumor implying Asher's alleged homosexuality spreads.
- Frustrated with Gossip Girl's choice of halting her publishing of gossip involving her and Jenny, Blair expresses to Dan how Gossip Girl's credibility is now similar to an inebriated Tinsley Mortimer.
- Jenny reveals that Dan wears L.L.Bean pants.
- Lily discusses hiring both wedding planner Preston Bailey and noted cake-maker Sylvia Weinstock for her wedding.

== Reception ==
"All About My Brother" was watched by 2.12 million of viewers, the least watched episode of the series to be aired in 2008.

The episode received generally favorable reviews. BuzzSugar gave the episode a positive review, and praised Leighton Meester's performances by saying that "Blair was on fire". She said that the "surrender of Little J to Blair was", in her own words, "classic". Jacob from Television Without Pity also gave the episode a positive review, claiming that the episode was as a whole "awesome", and that the final scene of Serena saying to Blair that she killed someone as a great surprise for the episode. Isabelle Carreau from TV Squad had used the word "OMFG" to describe how great the episode was, and that "the suspense" of Serena's storyline was "killing" her.
