= The Wedding Album (TV series) =

- The Wedding Album
- Starring: Bruno Campos; Tara Summers
- Country of origin: United States

Production
- Running time: 60 minutes

Original release
- Network: Fox

The Wedding Album is an American television pilot ordered by the Fox Network for the 2006-2007 television season. It was picked up for series order as a midseason replacement during the 2006-2007 television season. However, shortly after this, Fox ended development on the show, and replaced it with a similar project, The Wedding Bells, which received a midseason pick up.

== Synopsis ==
The pilot followed Tony Zutto, who while being one of the most sought-after wedding photographers in New York City, is also seemingly a lifelong playboy-bachelor, because of his family history. However, his lifestyle changes with the hiring of his new British assistant, Milla Cavendish. Also coming into the mix is Milla's roommate Gretchen, and Tony's photo lab technician Bruno. Tony also faces criticisms of his lifestyle from his minister-brother Peter, as well as from his father, bar-owner Danny.
