= Serena van der Woodsen =

Gossip Girl character

- Gossip Girl character
- Blake Lively as Serena van der Woodsen
- First appearance: Novel: Gossip Girl (2002); Television: "Pilot" (episode 1.01)
- Last appearance: Novel: I Will Always Love You; Television: "New York, I Love You XOXO" (episode 6.10)
- Created by: Character; Cecily von Ziegesar; Developed for Television; Josh Schwartz; Stephanie Savage
- Portrayed by: Blake Lively

In-universe information
- Full name: Novels: Serena Caroline Van der Woodsen; Television: Serena Celia van der Woodsen Humphrey
- Aliases: Sabrina; Gossip Girl 3.0 Savannah S
- Occupation: Novels: Yale University Student (graduated); New School Student (formerly); Hollywood Actress (made two films and her performance received positive reviews); Fashion model (she has posed for Fashion photographers and 2 acclaimed portrait artists, walked in NY Fashion Week for a famous designer, served as the face of a perfume brand and appeared on the cover of an internationally renowned Fashion magazine); High school student (graduated); Television: Socialite; Fashion model (former); Publicist (former); High school student (at Constance Billard; graduated); College student (at Columbia); Gossip Girl (former)
- Family: Novels: Mr. Van der Woodsen (father); Lillian Van der Woodsen (mother); Erik Van der Woodsen (brother); Television: William van der Woodsen (father); Lillian "Lily" van der Woodsen (mother); Eric van der Woodsen (brother); Bartholomew "Bart" Bass (former step-father; deceased); Rufus Humphrey (former step-father/father-in-law); Lola Rhodes (paternal half-sister); Scott Rosson (maternal half-brother); Charles "Chuck" Bass (former step-brother/adoptive brother); Jenny Humphrey (former step-sister/sister-in-law); Henry Bass (nephew, via Chuck and Blair); Rick and Celia "CeCe" Rhodes (maternal grandparents)
- Spouses: Television: Dan Humphrey (husband; flash-forward)
- Significant others: Novels: Chuck Bass (kissed in the prequel); Charles (ex-boyfriend); Nicolas (ex-boyfriend); Henry (ex-boyfriend); Dan Humphrey (ex-boyfriend); Julian Prospere "Flow" (ex-boyfriend); Aaron Rose (ex-boyfriend); Drew (ex-fling); Christian (ex-fling); Nate Archibald (ex-boyfriend); Television: Nate Archibald; Aaron Rose; Carter Baizen; Tripp Vanderbilt; Colin Forrester; Ben Donovan; Gabriel Edwards; Steven Spence
- Children: Television: Unnamed child (with Dan)
- Relatives: Novels: Unnamed aunts (see prequel); Unnamed uncles (see prequel); Television: Carol Rhodes (maternal aunt); Charlotte "Lola" Rhodes (paternal half-sister/cousin)
- Birthdate: 14 July 1991
- Friends: Novels: Blair (best friend); Nate (best friend); Vanessa (good friend); Jenny (friend); Georgina Spark (friend); Thaddeus Smith (close friend); Amanda Atkins (friend); Alysia (friend); Alison (friend); Serge (friend); Television: Blair (best friend); Nate (best friend); Chuck (best friend)

Serena van der Woodsen is a fictional character in the Gossip Girl novel series and in its TV adaptation, in which she is portrayed by Blake Lively. Serena is featured on the blog of the series' mysterious narrator, "Gossip Girl". Serena is known as the "it girl of Manhattan" and appears to easily get whatever she wants because of her captivating beauty and charismatic personality. She is the daughter of a successful doctor and a well-known socialite/heiress.

== Novel series ==
Angelical, Serena Caroline van der Woodsen (Serena Celia VDW in the television adaptation) is the most beautiful, the richest, the coolest, the most popular and the wildest of the heroines. Her father, Mr. van der Woodsen (William in the television adaptation), runs the same Dutch shipping firm his great-great-grandfather founded in the 18th century, and her mother, Lillian van der Woodsen, is a philanthropic art collector. Billionaires, her parents are on the boards of all major charities and art organizations in New York City. She also has an older brother, Erik (one or three years her senior; this detail is inconsistent in the novels), who attends Brown University. The van der Woodsens reside at 994 Fifth Avenue, a ritzy, white-gloved doorman building directly across the street from The Met and Central Park. Her family owns half the top floor in a 14-room penthouse.

Serena attends Constance Billard, an elite private girls’ school, until the end of her sophomore year then is admitted to Hanover Academy, a very prestigious co-ed boarding school. She is eventually expelled a year later for taking the liberty of extending her summer vacation without the administration’s approval. She returns to New York, where her former school agrees to take her back for her senior year. She is not particularly academically skilled and she is often told that she is not meeting her full potential. This continually causes problems with her best friend, Blair Waldorf, as Serena is able to waltz her way easily through life while herself has to work for things the blond beauty attains via her charm. A bit lazy, nonchalant and indecisive, she is nonetheless intelligent and perceptive and possesses numerous skills that help her obtain an excellent score on the SATs, which earns her admission to several of the most prestigious colleges in the country (Yale, Harvard, Princeton, Brown, Vassar, Wesleyan and Georgetown). However, she never fully realizes the extent of her potential and sometimes loses her way in life, unable to set boundaries or commit to real effort in pursuit of ambitious goals.

Serena is portrayed as kind and compassionate, though at times impulsive and emotionally inconsistent. She is sociable and enjoys an active lifestyle, but often struggles to maintain long-term romantic relationships. During high school, she dated Aaron Rose, Blair’s stepbrother, and was also briefly involved with Dan Humphrey and others.

Serena forms social connections and acquires opportunities across various environments. Although described as having high physical attractiveness, she does not prioritize her appearance, maintaining habits such as nail-biting and cutting her hair during school classes. While she is familiar with the fashion industry, she does not focus on her personal wardrobe or clothing choices.

Because of her free-spirited nature, she and Blair — her longtime best friend — often end up fighting. But despite their frequent clashes and the brunette sometimes openly hostile attitude towards her, Serena continues throughout the series to care deeply about her friend’s well-being. She also has a complicated relationship with Nate, her other best friend, with whom she lost her virginity at age fifteen. The two never quite know whether they are in love with each other or simply friends.

For a time, Serena experimented with modeling — posing for renowned fashion or portrait photographers, walking the runway at New York Fashion Week for a famous designer (Les Best), becoming the face of a perfume brand that bears her name (Serena's Tears) and even appearing on the cover of an internationally acclaimed fashion magazine (W Magazine) — before ultimately landing the female lead in a remake of Breakfast at Tiffany’s (Breakfast at Fred's) and its cinematic sequel (Coffee at the Palace), performances that were highly praised by critics.

After finishing high school, she decides to take a gap year to focus on this new career and try to discover who she is, before eventually returning to university. She first attends the New School in New York for a year then transfers to the prestigious Yale University, from which she graduates barely two years later then transfers to the prestigious Yale University. Though Serena never managed to choose a specific academic path, it is known that her university courses mainly revolved around philosophy, theater and literature. At Yale, she changed a lot, taking her studies seriously for the first time and discovering new interests. She stopped trying to entertain herself at all costs and even maintained a second romantic relationship with the same guy, Dan, for two years. It appears at the end, however, that she's still in love with Nate.

During her senior year, she becomes friends with Vanessa Abrams and Georgina Spark and takes Jenny Humphrey under her wing.

Serena is described as tall (5'7) with long light-gold hair that curls slightly at her temples and large dark blue — almost navy — eyes. She is slender, willowy, with a slim waist, narrow hips, delicate shoulders, a flat stomach, well-shaped buttocks and long, thin legs. She has a 34B bust and a perfectly sculpted face, fair skin, rosy cheeks, full lips that tilt upward at the corners, an aristocratic chin and straight, white teeth. She is ethereally beautiful, often described as "perfect" in the books.

The character may be based on Hadley Nagel, another wealthy and beautiful New York City socialite, who in 2010 made her debut at the International Debutante Ball. In 2009 Cecily von Ziegesar wrote on a copy of her newest Gossip Girl novel "To Hadley, the real thing". Janet Malcolm of The New Yorker called Serena "incandescently beautiful, exceptionally kind, and, in the end, it has to be said, somewhat boring."

== Television series ==
=== Characterization ===
People compared Serena to Josh Schwartz's original it-girl creation, Marissa Cooper, writing that Serena "seems to have it all, but in addition to a party girl reputation, dark family secrets and a disregard for high society, Serena one-ups the sulky Coop with a history of BFF betrayal." Jason Gay of Rolling Stone called Serena "the bad girl gone good(ish) who serves as Gossip Girl's wobbly moral compass". Describing her early strained relationship with Blair, Gay wrote, "Lively's Serena is a former queen bee who mysteriously disappeared from campus, only to return and find her spiteful ex-best friend, Blair (Meester), in charge." In an interview, Lively said of Serena, "I feel ridiculous at times with her, because I'm, you know, killing someone or marrying someone, but I look like me. I'm like, 'Oh, this is absurd.'" Vogue magazine wrote that Lively's upbringing helped her portray Serena and called her "dazzling and worldly and optimistic". Her mother, a former model from Georgia, dressed Lively differently, and her differing fashion choices drew the attention of her classmates at her L.A. private school. "It was the only school where people were just downright mean to me", Lively said. "They would make fun of my clothes because I dressed differently than the other kids."

=== Season 1 ===
The first season introduces Serena as a beautiful, wealthy daughter of divorced parents who returns from boarding school. Her return sparks her old rivalry with her best friend, Blair. Serena's return is due to her younger brother, Eric van der Woodsen, who attempted suicide. She is considered unwelcome, especially by her former best friend Blair, who has always seen Serena as a threat to her reign as Queen Bee of Constance. After Serena reconciles with her, Chuck Bass reveals to Serena that he knows the cause of her sudden departure before the first season—taking Nate Archibald's (Blair's boyfriend) virginity during a wedding— and he tries to kiss her. Serena escapes and runs into Dan, a St. Jude's student from Brooklyn, who often expresses cynicism about his wealthier classmates' lifestyle. Serena also finds a friend in Jenny Humphrey, Dan's younger sister. Nate eventually reveals his tryst with Serena to Blair, and Serena is ostracized in the first few episodes. Blair and Serena consistently fight and reconcile throughout the subsequent episodes, often dealing with Serena's tendency to overshadow Blair. Serena and Blair reconcile after a heartfelt confrontation that prompts Serena to admit her mistake with Nate and leaving Blair in her time of need.

Serena encounters myriad problems as her mother becomes engaged to Bart Bass, who forces her family to adjust to living with Chuck. Then she discovers her mother's relationship with Dan's father, Rufus Humphrey, and the complications of embarking on a relationship with Dan, which is met with the disapproval of her mother and her peers. Her relationship with Dan is further complicated by the arrival of Georgina Sparks, a longtime friend who slowly reveals to viewers the real reason Serena left Manhattan. Georgina drives her to commit the same mistakes she did before leaving Manhattan, from partying excessively to drinking heavily, causing Serena to miss the SAT. Serena confronts Georgina, only to draw her anger, prompting Georgina to destroy her relationship with Dan and blackmail her with knowledge of a particular event in the past: she accidentally killed a man. Serena's constant lying in order to keep Dan from discovering her past eventually takes its toll on their relationship, and Dan breaks up with her.

Blair eventually retaliates against Georgina with the help of Chuck and Nate and the intervention of Vanessa, successfully driving Georgina out of Manhattan. Serena finally tells Dan the truth, only to discover during Lily's wedding that he wants to end their relationship. A disappointed Serena attempts to move on throughout the summer.

=== Season 2 ===
The second season shows Serena spending the summer with her family and Blair in the Hamptons, attempting to move on from her relationship with Dan. During a dramatic party, she and Dan briefly reconcile and return to New York. Their relationship becomes public again but ends sooner than expected during a blackout as neither can move past the problems that previously ruined their relationship. After a disastrous double date with Dan and a new transfer, Amanda, that ends with two of Blair's mean girls throwing Nair at Amanda and Dan accusing Serena of being behind it, Serena takes matters into her own hands and reestablishes herself as Queen, thus reigniting her rivalry with Blair. She has Dan publicly ostracized throughout the school. Exposing herself to New York's high society, she meets Poppy Lifton, a socialite, and further strains her relationship with Blair during Eleanor Waldorf's fashion show when she and Poppy participate in it. Serena and Blair reconcile during a trip to Yale, where she didn't originally want to apply to but then did after Blair told her she couldn't possibly get in.

An exhibit at Rufus's gallery has Serena finding new love with a childhood friend and artist, Aaron Rose. She reconciles with Dan but their friendship soon threatens her relationship with Aaron, prompting him to escort her to a ball where Serena receives news from her mother of Bart's death. During Bart's funeral, Aaron notices her continually drawn towards Dan and invites her to come with him to Argentina, which she accepts. Upon their return, Serena breaks up with Aaron, and she is free to pursue a relationship with Dan. They reunite, only to face the awkward discovery that they share a sibling. Dan and Serena's relationship further suffers when she realizes their diverging college choices, her continual mistrust of him, and Dan's affair with a teacher that drives her to prematurely end their relationship.

After throwing a disastrous Sweet Sixteen party for Jenny, Serena retreats to Spain with Poppy and Poppy's boyfriend, Gabriel Edwards. She returns to New York pursued by Gabriel after he broke up with Poppy and finds herself in a new relationship. During a party held by her mother, Serena discovers that Gabriel and Poppy have conned her mother's guests and calls on Blair's aid to obtain their stolen money, breaking up with Gabriel as she pursues Poppy. Blair reluctantly teams up with Chuck and a reformed Georgina, ignoring Lily's wishes that they let her handle it herself. The plan completely backfires: Serena is arrested, Poppy escapes, and Georgina, becoming the scapegoat, eases back into her old ways.

A stubborn Serena chooses to stay in prison until Dan bails her out and the two go to prom together. Her arrest soon adds to her fame as she becomes a local celebrity. On graduation day, Gossip Girl sends a blast that further ruins Serena's and her friends' reputations. Declaring war on Gossip Girl, Serena finds herself the center of blame when a ticked-off Gossip Girl decides to drop every unreleased piece of gossip she had in store, creating further division within the group. Sending a text to Gossip Girl, Serena calls a bluff that she knows Gossip Girl's identity, only for Gossip Girl to escape and warn everyone that she'll be pursuing them in college. She spends the summer leaving New York with Carter in pursuit of her father.

=== Season 3 ===
Serena returns from her European adventure and a complicated relationship with Carter that indicates a possible romance. The Los Angeles Times noted her character's penchant for secrecy but wrote, "It initially seems as though Bad Serena is back, but we all know her highway of crazy behavior is always paved with good intentions." Serena's relationship with Carter earns the disapproval of her peers but she discovers redeeming qualities in him. Lily first assumes that she's preparing to go to Brown but defers from entering, preferring to stay in the city and find herself. During Lily's wedding, she discovers Carter's previous transgressions and loses him when he chooses to make amends for his mistakes, breaking her heart in the process.

Serena eventually makes her time in New York useful by taking a job as a publicist, one that is short-lived as her relationships with both her friends and her family begin to erode. Her friendships with Blair and Nate crumble due to her job but she finds even more trouble when she falls for Nate's married congressman cousin, Tripp van der Bilt (Aaron Tveit). Her relationship with him is tumultuous as both Nate and Blair fail to persuade her to end it. The affair ends when an offer to become a mistress from Tripp's wife makes her come to her senses. As Serena and Tripp return to New York, their car crashes, leaving her hospitalized. She survives and Nate proves his love for her. They begin a relationship.

When Chuck's mother returns, Serena's resolve to find her father reignites. Her decision slowly damages her relationship with Nate as she reconnects with Carter, who is back to his old habits. Knowing that he has information about her father, the two work together to find him but is no longer interested in a relationship with Carter. Jenny's growing feelings for Nate also threaten her relationship with him when she makes every effort to steal Nate for herself. One incident occurs during Nate's "assassin" birthday bash. During the party, Nate and Jenny happen to be the last two players. After being stuck in a supply closet, she kisses Nate, despite him being in love with Serena, straining their relationship further. After a night drinking with Chuck and Nate, Nate and Jenny go back to his apartment. As Serena gets off the elevator, she sees Jenny trying to kiss Nate. Nate kicks Jenny out of the apartment to reconcile with Serena, spurning Jenny's advances.

During Dorota's wedding, Serena leaves with Carter and gives Jenny a message telling Nate that she has found her father. Serena soon finds out that Carter has been delaying her in an attempt to get close to her and leaves him, flying alone. Upon arriving, she is shocked to find her mother answering the hotel door, assuming that she had been in Canyon Ranch the entire time.

William van der Woodsen (William Baldwin) returns, making Serena happy, but is unknowingly dragged into her father's plot to win back his ex-wife. The plot nearly works until Jenny, Blair, Nate, and Chuck scheme against William, who had been trying to frame Rufus for adultery and intentionally misdiagnosing Lily, and William leaves. Her father's departure leads to Dan comforting her and reignites her feelings for him. Serena sleeps over at Dan's and they wake in a compromising position, one that Jenny photographs and sends to Gossip Girl. As the photo spreads, Nate and Serena temporarily end their relationship and she joins Blair for a summer in Paris.

=== Season 4 ===
Serena spends the summer in Paris with Blair, reluctant to tell Blair that she has enrolled in Columbia, something Blair fears will have them return to their high school pettiness, when she receives news that Chuck might be dead. After an unfortunate double date involving a handsome royal, Blair eventually forgives her. Chuck's arrival and a visit to a Parisian morgue confirm that he is alive but Serena pursues him in hopes of convincing him to return to New York when he tries to run away to London. She returns to New York having made her decision between Dan and Nate but her decision becomes irrelevant when she sees them with their new significant others, Vanessa and Juliet Sharp (Katie Cassidy), a girl with a personal vendetta against Serena.

Serena's enrollment at Columbia has her face Juliet's many attempts to get rid of her: excluding her from an exclusive society and driving Blair against her; exposing her relationship with her professor, Colin Forrester (Sam Page), who happens to be Juliet's cousin, to get her kicked out; and spreading various rumors about Serena, who manages to evade these attempts. Juliet then recruits Jenny and Vanessa and succeeds in gaslighting her into toying with Dan and Nate's feelings, attempting to take a foundation position from Blair, and returning to her old partying habits. Serena is rehabilitated while Dan and Blair discover Juliet's reasons for ruining Serena. Serena was supposedly in an illicit but unconsummated relationship with Juliet's half-brother and Serena's boarding school English teacher, Ben Donovan (David Call), and was arrested when Lily forged an affidavit that falsely accused Ben of statutory rape out of concern for Serena.

The holidays have Serena trying to figure out how to release Ben from prison and her relationship with Lily is yet again strained. Serena and Dan put a possible return to their relationship on hold, knowing they might not have the same chance to love and trust each other. Meanwhile, Ben's release from prison reignites Serena's feelings for him and they pursue a loving but troubled relationship. Serena's relationship with Ben slowly erodes when she receives news from Vanessa that he is responsible for hurting Nate's father in prison and when Ben's mother, Cynthia, raises Ben's personal troubles while at the same time seeking to exonerate him. Serena becomes proud of her mother when Lily decides to face the consequences of sending an innocent Ben to prison. Serena and Ben's relationship eventually ends due to family complications.

Serena's cousin, Charlie Rhodes, comes to stay with Serena's family for a while. Charlie helps Serena find out that Dan and Blair have had a secret romance, causing a fight between Serena and Blair. Serena continues to use Charlie as a spy until noticing that Charlie is starting to act exactly like Serena and steals Serena's dress. In the season finale, Serena gets Charlie to help with a medical condition, though it is later revealed that Charlie is really Ivy, and Ivy is just acting. Later, while walking the streets of Los Angeles, Serena gets offered a job in Hollywood, where she decides to move.

=== Season 5 ===
In Season 5, Serena is working as a film producer's assistant in Los Angeles and spending her free time with Nate and Chuck. Serena's boss, Marshall, is difficult to please, but his boss, Jane, promotes Serena after she succeeds at a task that Marshall failed. Later, she runs into Charlie and convinces her to move with her back to New York.

When Dan tells Serena, Nate, Blair, Chuck, Rufus, and Lily that he wrote a book about his life and their roles in it, Serena is offended when he portrays her as a self-centered, promiscuous party girl and even more upset when Blair tells her that's exactly who she's been. After this revelation, she stops speaking to Dan. But this cannot last, as her boss, Jane, requires Serena to get the movie rights to Dan's book. He agrees, saying he trusts her, and she gives him her word to protect him and his work. When Jane tries to smear Dan's character in the movie, she kills the deal to protect him. When Dan finds out, he accuses her of killing the movie because of the way it portrays her. Heartbroken by his accusation, she reveals her real reason for killing the movie, then walks away.

After being fired by Jane, Serena is hired by Nate's boss, Diana Payne, to start a blog based on her life in order to take down Gossip Girl. Later, Nate and Serena discover a list of sources for Gossip Girl, which would be the silver bullet in Diana's campaign against Gossip Girl. They struggle over whether to use it and decide it would be too damaging to release. The list is leaked anyway and the two accuse each other before Blair discovers that Louis leaked Gossip Girl's sources. Charlie encourages Serena to start dating in order to motivate her for her blog and she begins dating a guy named Max she met on the street, not knowing that Max is actually Charlie's ex-boyfriend. Diana arranges for Max to meet Serena at the opening of Chuck's premiere of Sleep No More to make it look like Max has stood her up. Serena forgives Max for standing her up, and the two begin dating.

Charlie finds out the two are dating and convinces her to slow down the relationship. Serena's aunt Carol returns and Serena overhears an argument between them about Carol forcing Charlie to live under the name 'Ivy Dickens'. Serena makes the connection between Max and Charlie when she remembers that Max's ex-girlfriend's name was Ivy. She demands the truth from Charlie and Max. Ivy as Charlie and Carol manage to convince Serena and the family that Max is lying and Serena tells Max to leave before she calls the police.

As Serena and Lily prepare Charlie for her debut into New York society, Dan tells Serena that he is going to tell Blair how he feels about her. In order to make Dan see that Blair's happy ending will be with Louis, she sends Louis to the Humphrey loft. When she finds Dan with Blair and Chuck later, she realizes that he gave up his desire for Blair for Blair's own happiness with Chuck and realizes that Blair is still in love with Chuck. Later that night, after Charlie's debutante party, Serena receives a call from Nate that Blair and Chuck have been in an accident. This causes Serena to declare war on Gossip Girl, using Nate's power at the Spectator, and Dan.

With Gossip Girl gone, Serena finds that Gossip Girl's tipsters have begun sending their blasts to her via her blog. Nate encourages her to use the blasts productively, but Serena is reluctant to become the next Gossip Girl. Meanwhile, Serena is concerned for Blair's well-being and confronts her at Nate's New Year's Eve party, where Blair tells her that the accident was God's way of telling her that she and Chuck are not meant to be together, that she promised God that if Chuck lived, she would marry Louis, and that Dan has been going to church with her since. In order to cover Blair, Serena pretends that she has rekindled her romance with Dan. This "romance" becomes the focus of her soon-to-be-launched blog, which causes problems for Dan, as while Dan thinks that their romance is fake, Serena is shown to have genuine feelings for Dan again.

Serena is humiliated at the press premiere of her new blog, being photographed holding a tablet that shows "Site not found." Upset, she is told the time wasn't right for her blog, but she ultimately discovers that Nate had it shut down as a favor to Gossip Girl. In return, Gossip Girl would help him find out the truth about Blair and Chuck's car accident. Serena doesn't agree with Nate's suspicions that Tripp was responsible, and confronts the latter over at the Waldorf residence. This is revealed to be a set-up brought about by Nate, Serena, and Nate's grandfather as a way for Tripp to admit that he was behind the accident thinking that Nate was going to be in the car instead.

Serena finds out that Blair was arrested at her own bachelorette party, and rushes to her aide. Blair tells her that she's all right, and that since she's going to go through with her wedding, Serena doesn't have to pretend to be together with Dan anymore. Serena decides to keep this truth from Dan a little longer.

On Blair's wedding day, Serena tries to convince Blair not to marry Louis. Blair goes through with her wedding anyway, even after Gossip Girl launches a video of Blair professing her true feelings to Chuck. After the vows are said, Serena, Dan, and Nate confront Georgina and she blames each of them in a vague manner before leaving. When Blair goes missing after her wedding, Serena and Chuck search for her, and find her in a motel in Queens with Dan, which upsets Serena as she still has feelings for him. When Georgina arrives, Serena is revealed to have Georgina's videocamera, which was used to record Blair's confession, and she takes the fall for the video.

Blair and Serena are in yet another rut but forgive each other and Serena is unknowingly set up on a blind date with Dan, after she told him her feelings and he rejected her. At a party later, she and Georgina find Dan and Blair kissing, causing another rift between her and Blair. After her grandmother's death and shocking news of her will, Serena starts a vendetta against Ivy (who received the majority of CeCe's estate), trying to win back her family fortune. In a surprising turn of events, she gets a package from former Gossip Girl Georgina Sparks containing a computer and the means necessary to become the next Gossip Girl. Serena accepts.

After losing the reins to Gossip Girl and her unintentional role in exposing Blair's diary to the Upper East Side, Serena attempts to deceive Blair by having sex with Dan. The plan almost works, but Dan realizes what has happened. Serena once again tells Dan she loves him but Dan tells her he feels nothing for her. Depressed, Serena leaves the city with one of Damien Dalgaard's drug dealers, a flashback to her days before she returned to the Upper East Side in season one.

=== Season 6 ===
In season 6, Serena is seen together with a new boyfriend, Steven Spence (who is significantly older than her). She is seen leading a happy, peaceful life away from the UES. Confronted by Blair, she simply says that she doesn't see how they could ever be friends again. Serena ultimately moves back to the UES with Steven and his jealous daughter Sage. Sage uses every chance she gets to sabotage her father's relationship with Serena, and proves herself to be on par, scheming-wise, with Georgina and Blair. After some shocking revelations, including that Steven slept with Lily when her last name was Müller, they decide to end things.

Serena is reunited with Dan again in a last attempt to make things work. Dan has been writing a scathingly honest sequel to "Inside" with Georgina's help. One of his last and most poignant chapters is The Serena Chapter, which is released during the Thanksgiving party. In it, Serena is described as a "Golden girl" who lives for attention and love, and dramatically ends things with Dan. She decides to move away from New York, but is intercepted by Dan, who tries to convince her he has always loved her and always will. Hurt and upset, she doesn't believe him and leaves. Before she leaves, Dan slides a file into her bag, which she opens on the plane before takeoff. It is revealed that Dan wrote two chapters on Serena, and that the second was the "Good Serena Chapter". She gets off the plane and goes to talk things through with Dan.

In the finale, Dan reveals to her how they first met at a party at Blair's, and how he fell in love at first sight. He had then realized that he could never pull her out of her world and into his, so he found a way to enter her world by creating a UES blog. This blog, launching Serena's rise to legend, became known as Gossip Girl. Serena realizes that Gossip Girl was only ever a manifestation of Dan's love for her, and that he practically wrote them all a seven-year-long love letter.

A scene set in the future shows everyone reunited at the Bass-Waldorf residence, witnessing the marriage of Dan and Serena.

=== 2021 sequel series ===
Serena does not appear in the 2021 sequel series, but in the episode "How to Bury a Millionaire" from season two, Georgina reveals that she lives in Brooklyn Heights and is still married to Dan. Georgina also revealed that the couple have a kid.

== Reception ==
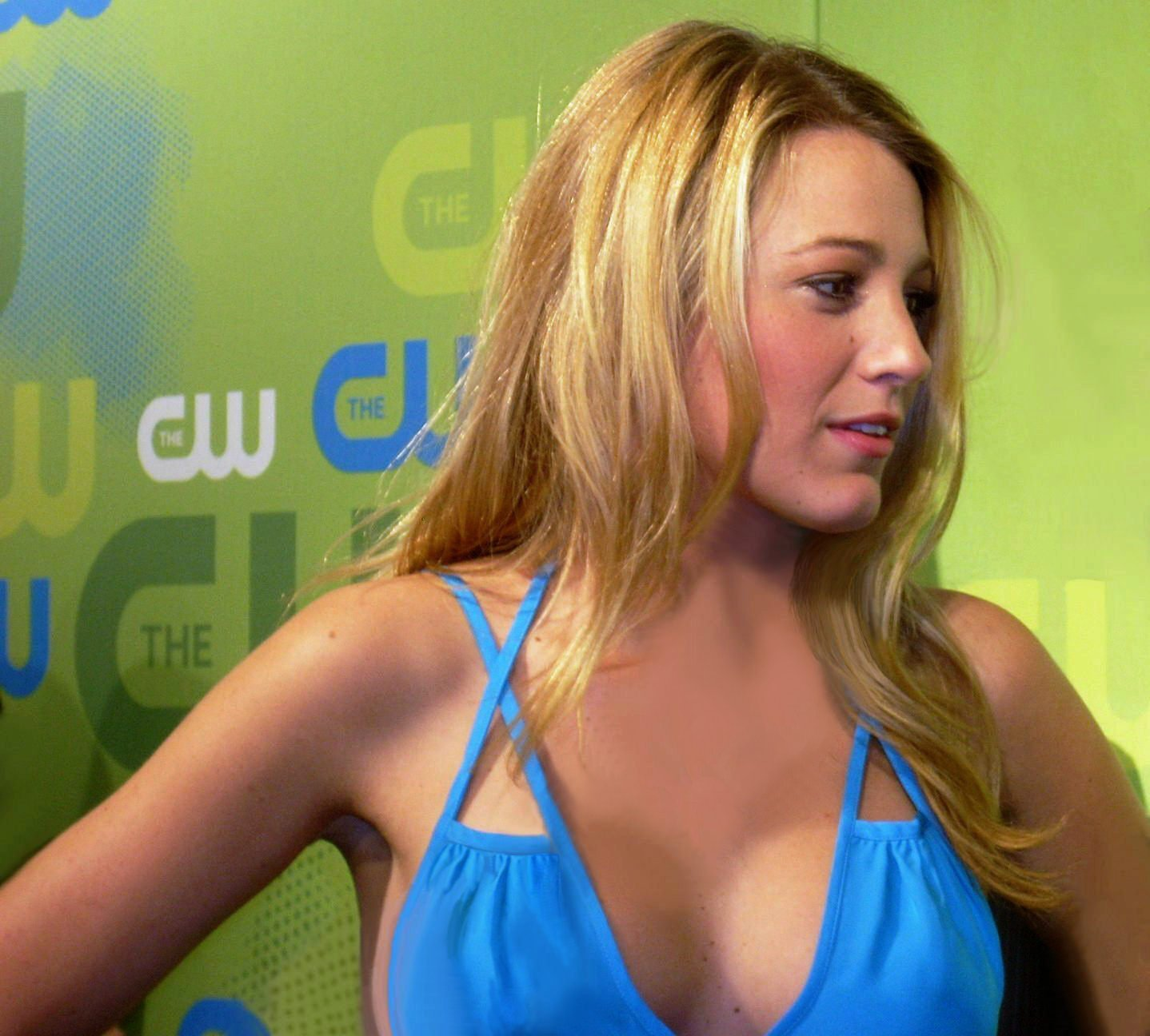
Blake Lively, who portrayed Serena, at a Gossip Girl event.

=== Television ===
Serena's style has earned noteworthy praise from periodicals such as InStyle and NYLON. EW's Meeta Agrawal places Blake Lively's Serena van der Woodsen amongst the wearers of the 20 Knockout Dresses of the '00s. Her Tory Burch-designed dress in the pilot earning the 2nd spot on the list. People magazine references an issue of NYLON, reporting that even the actress herself admits to liking her character's style and wardrobe and InStyle's Joyann King praises "Serena’s vixen-like style and Lively’s smoldering off-screen choices". In an interview for Vanity Fair, costume designers Eric Daman and Meredith Markworth-Pollack considered fashion model Kate Moss and New York socialites Tinsley Mortimer and Arden Wohl as a muse when dressing Lively and when asked if they were influenced by New York socialites, respectively. TV Guide named her the fifth most fashionable TV character. Glamour listed her as one of the 12 Most Stylish TV Characters.

Blair and Serena's friendship was praised as "it offered a relationship whose depth and complexity approached Rory and Paris' [from Gilmore Girls]." Vanity Fair considered Serena's murder storyline to be "unrealistic" and "an obvious ratings ploy," going on to compare it to a dramatic scene in The O.C., stating that the show may have possibly jumped the shark.

For her portrayal of Serena van der Woodsen, Blake Lively won the 2008 Teen Choice Award for Choice TV Actress Drama and was nominated for the same award in 2009 and 2010, losing to her co-star, Leighton Meester, who portrays Blair Waldorf. She, however, won the award again in 2011. Lively also earned a People's Choice Award nomination for Favorite TV Drama Actress in 2011 and 2012.
