= Mark Piznarski =

American film and television director (1954–2026)

- Born: July 7, 1954
- Died: April 4, 2026 (aged 71)
- Occupations: Film director, television director, television producer
- Years active: 1986–2018

Mark Piznarski (July 7, 1954 – April 4, 2026) was an American film and television director, and television producer.

== Life and career ==
Piznarski was born on July 7, 1954. He was an alumnus of the University of Northern Colorado. He directed episodes of a number of television series, including Veronica Mars, Gossip Girl, 90210, NYPD Blue, Friday Night Lights, Everwood, My So-Called Life, Relativity, Crisis, Riverdale and Once and Again.

He also directed a number of television films, including Death Benefit (1996), The '60s (1999), and Soccer Moms (2005). In 2000, he directed the theatrical film Here on Earth. In 2006, he co-wrote and directed the film Looking for Sunday (2006).

Piznarski died on April 4, 2026, at the age of 71.

The Veronica Mars character Stosh "Piz" Piznarski is named as a tribute to him. He directed the first two episodes of season one.
