= Nan Zhang (actress) =

American actress and model (born 1986)

- Born: November 1, 1986 (age 39); Bengbu, Anhui, China
- Occupations: Actress, model
- Years active: 2006 - 2012

Nan Zhang (born November 1, 1986, Chinese: 张楠; pinyin: Zhāng Nán) is an American actress and model. She co-starred as Kati Farkas in The CW teen drama, Gossip Girl, until the show ended in 2012.

== Early life and education ==
Born in Bengbu in the province of Anhui, China, Zhang and her family moved to the United States when she was six years old and settled in Slidell, Louisiana. She is an only child. After being selected in Chanel/Seventeen Magazine's New Model of the Year contest at the age of 16, Zhang decided to pursue modeling.

== Career ==
Her acting debut came about when Zhang was discovered by a casting director while she was at a nail salon in New York which landed her a bit part in The Shanghai Hotel and followed with an uncredited bit part in West 32nd. Zhang's short lived break into showbiz came in March 2007 when she was cast in the supporting role of Kati Farkas in the television adaptation of the popular young adult novels, Gossip Girl.

Before acting, Zhang started her career as a model in New York.

== Personal life ==
Zhang had previously wanted to be actively involved with neuroscience research and returned to Johns Hopkins University to pursue her pre-med/neuroscience degree. She graduated in 2012, while filming simultaneously. She then went on to attain her graduate degree from Johns Hopkins University.
