= Josh Schwartz =

American screenwriter and television producer (b. 1976)

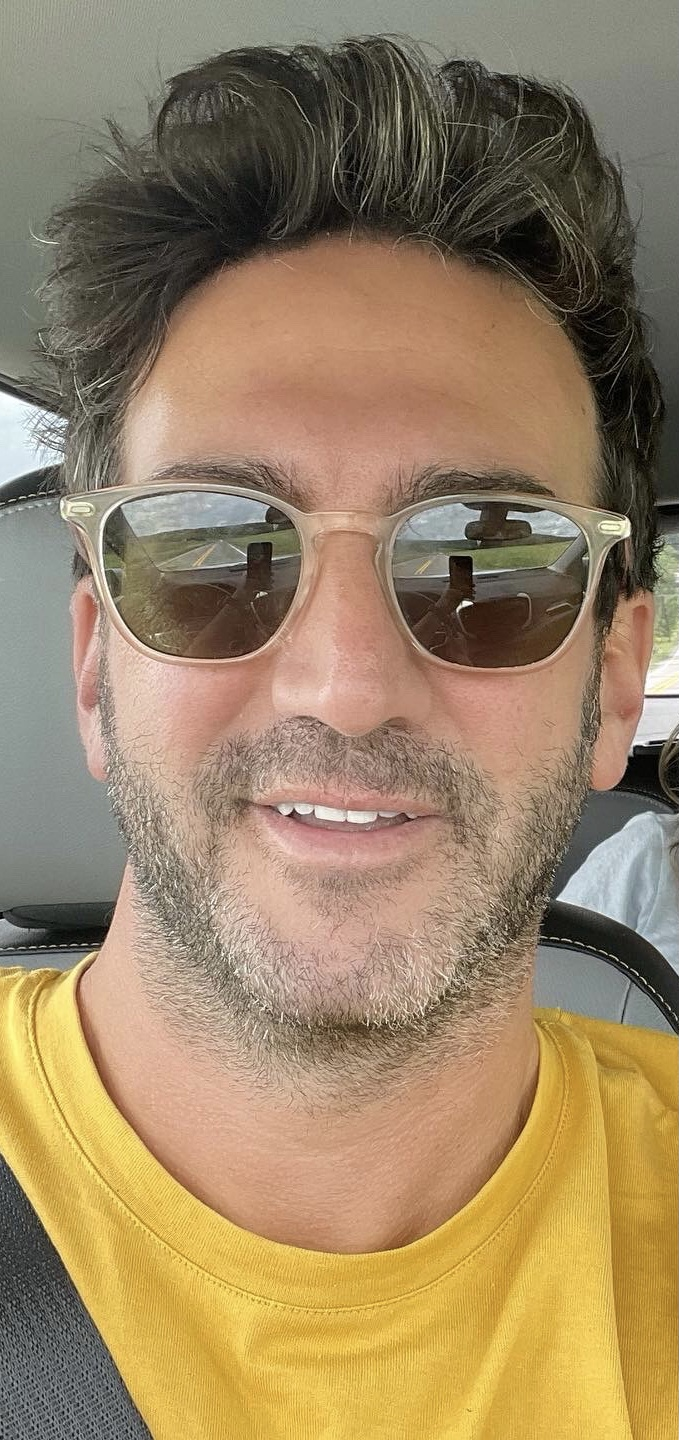
- Schwartz in 2021
- Born: Joshua Ian Schwartz; August 6, 1976 (age 50); Providence, Rhode Island, U.S.
- Occupations: Writer, producer
- Spouse: Jill Stonerock (m. 2008; div. 2021)
- Children: 3
- Writing career
- Notable works: The O.C., Gossip Girl, Chuck, Runaways

Joshua Ian Schwartz (born August 6, 1976) is an American screenwriter and television producer. He is best known for creating and executive producing the Fox teen drama series The O.C. which ran for 4 seasons. Schwartz is also known for developing The CW's series Gossip Girl based on the book of the same name and for co-creating NBC's action-comedy-spy series, Chuck. At 26, he became one of the youngest people in network history to create a series and run its day-to-day production when he ran The O.C.

== Early life ==
Schwartz was born to a Jewish family in 1976 in Providence, Rhode Island, the son of Steve and Honey Schwartz. His parents were both toy inventors at Hasbro, working on the development of toys such as Transformers and My Little Pony, until they went on to start their own company. Schwartz grew up on the east side of Providence, Rhode Island, with a younger brother, Danny, and a younger sister, Katie. Schwartz always had ambitions of being a writer since early childhood.

When Schwartz was seven years old, he won an essay-writing contest at summer camp for a review of the recently released movie Gremlins; the opening line was "Spielberg has done it again" and stood out amongst the other submissions.

He attended Providence's private Wheeler School, a coeducational independent day school, for 11 years, graduating with the class of 1994.

== Career ==
In 1995, Schwartz attended film school to study screen and television writing at the University of Southern California (USC). He became a member of the Pi Kappa Alpha fraternity, as well as president of the chapter, and got to see what it's like "behind the gated communities and big mansions" of Southern California which would later provide fodder for his pilot The O.C.

While at USC, Schwartz tried out stand-up comedy at a talent show in front of five hundred people but was "disabused of [the] notion very quickly." In his sophomore year he wrote an autobiographical screenplay about his senior year in high school called Providence as a homework assignment for school. He entered his screenplay into a contest for the prestigious Nicholson Award in Screenwriting, the highest honor awarded to undergraduates, and won. However, the prize was later revoked; to be eligible he had to be in his junior year at the time. Schwartz says "I dropped it in a box – I was a sophomore. And I got a call over the summer saying I'd won, and I'd won five thousand dollars. I was like, 'This is awesome!' Then they called back, like, the next day and said you had to be a junior to enter and not a sophomore, so they were rescinding it. I was pretty pissed." With help from connections through his fraternity, he generated interest in Hollywood, and in 1997, Sony's TriStar Pictures bought his first screenplay in a bidding war for a deal guaranteeing $550,000 and worth up to $1 million while he was still a junior in college. It was never made.

Schwartz got an agent and subsequently wrote a TV pilot called Brookfield for ABC/Disney while he was still studying at USC. It was a boarding school drama about wealthy kids in New England and was his first TV pilot script; it sold only a few months after he had sold his first feature film script. Brookfield was produced starring Amy Smart and Eric Balfour but never aired. Schwartz then dropped out of USC to work full-time and wrote another pilot called Wall to Wall Records, a drama about working in a music store for Warner Bros. TV that was also produced but never aired.

His writing influences include Cameron Crowe and Woody Allen.

=== The O.C. (2003–2007) ===
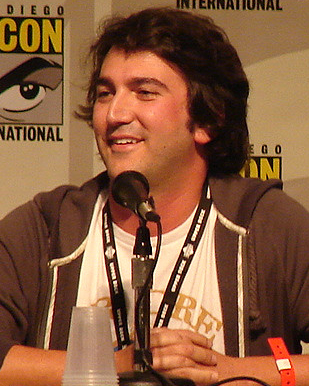
Schwartz at the 2007 San Diego Comic-Con

In 2003, Schwartz wrote a pilot called The O.C. for Warner Bros. TV and Wonderland Sound and Vision which was produced with him as creator and executive producer. At 26 he was the youngest ever creator of a TV show, which did not sit well with Fox executives who sent a series of seasoned pros armed with conventional ideas about how to steer the show and a bitterness about sharing control with someone so young. That changed when Bob DeLaurentis signed on, a TV veteran who proved to be a nurturing presence on the show. Schwartz and Bob DeLaurentis collaborated on supervising and approving the editors' work on each episode in post-production.

The O.C. became an instant teen favorite when it debuted on the Fox Network in August 2003. The show popularized its setting, Orange County, and led to copycats like MTV's reality show Laguna Beach: The Real Orange County and the Bravo documentary series The Real Housewives of Orange County. The show became well known for its music, chosen by Schwartz according to his own musical tastes and designed to reflect who the characters were, bringing the general public an awareness of indie rock bands like Death Cab for Cutie, Bloc Party and Rooney. He has said that he partially based The O.C. character Seth Cohen on his own Jewish upbringing. Schwartz was nominated for a Writers Guild of America Award for the pilot as well as a People's Choice Award. The O.C. was named "Guilty Pleasure of the Year" by VH1. In 2007, after 4 seasons The O.C. was canceled due to a significant ratings drop.

Schwartz has stayed in touch with his alma maters: The Wheeler School and USC. In 2005, he endowed USC with its first television writing scholarship: The Josh Schwartz Scholarship. The scholarship is intended to be awarded annually to a student or students concentrating on writing for television and in need of financial assistance, who have completed a TV pilot script and first season synopsis. Although Schwartz never graduated from USC he has since worked with many USC alumni. In 2005 he gave a commencement speech to The Wheeler School.

Schwartz has worked on his share of stalled projects. In 2004, he worked as a script doctor on the J. J. Abrams Superman screenplay that Warner Bros. eventually tossed. He sold a pilot to Fox called Alphabet City, a drama about a New York tabloid but it was never produced. He also worked on a drama for Fox called Athens described as an "OC" companion but it was never produced.

=== Recent projects (2007–present) ===
In 2005, Paramount signed Schwartz to adapt and direct John Green's young adult novel Looking for Alaska with producer Mark Waters.

It was revealed in late August 2006 that Schwartz would develop and executive produce a drama pilot for The CW, based on the popular book series Gossip Girl by Cecily von Ziegesar. Similar to The O.C., Gossip Girl is a satirical approach of teenagers in a wealthy upbringing. Gossip Girl became a popular show for The CW.

In 2007, Schwartz signed a three-year, seven-figure overall deal with Warner Bros. TV to write and exec produce with Chris Fedak an hourlong high-concept action comedy called Chuck for NBC about twenty-something spies and was described in press releases as "in the vein of Grosse Pointe Blank". The plot revolves around a normal guy who downloads the entire CIA and NSA databases into his head.

In May 2008, Schwartz joined Zak Penn's X-Men: First Class project. Schwartz announced that he will write the script for X-Men: First Class, a prequel to the X-Men movies that focuses on the adventures of teen Cyclops, Marvel Girl, Professor X, Beast, Iceman, and Angel. However, his script was later jettisoned.

In Spring 2009, Schwartz launched "Rockville CA", a web-series on TheWB.com that follows young 20-somethings at a fictional rock club in Los Angeles. There are twenty indie band performances in the episodes, including Lykke Li, The Kooks and Kaiser Chiefs.

It was also announced that Schwartz would write and direct Bright Lights, Big City for MGM, based on the iconic debut novel by Jay McInerney. Stephanie Savage was also announced as producer.

In February 2011, The CW ordered a pilot of his new project titled Hart of Dixie. The show is co-produced with longtime creative partner Stephanie Savage and stars former "O.C." castmember and personal friend of Schwartz, Rachel Bilson. The show was picked up in May 2011 and premiered in fall 2011. At the same time, Schwartz has also been working on a Georgetown pilot for ABC However, ABC did not pick the series for its 2011 - 2012 schedule.

In September 2011, it was announced by The CW that Schwartz and Stephanie Savage had been selected to develop the television adaption of Candace Bushnell's The Carrie Diaries, a prequel to the original Sex and the City television series. The series, set in the 1980s, will follow character Carrie Bradshaw during her years in high school.

In January 2012, it was announced The CW had ordered a pilot for new drama titled Cult, result of collaboration with Stephanie Savage and Len Goldstein. This is Schwartz and Savage's fourth series on the network.

He also developed several adaptations of popular properties, such as Runaways for Marvel, a reboot of Dynasty and Nancy Drew for CW.

It was announced in 2025 that Schwartz would be one of three executive producers on an upcoming Peacock series based on Clueless.

== Personal life ==
On September 20, 2008, Schwartz married Jill Stonerock in Santa Barbara, California. The couple were introduced by actress Rachel Bilson, who portrayed Summer Roberts on Schwartz's show The O.C. Bilson was the maid of honor at the couple's wedding and is godmother of their two daughters.

On December 28, 2021, Schwartz filed for divorce due to "irreconcilable differences". In February 2025, he had a daughter with Dallas D'Lyn Wand.

== Filmography ==
=== Film ===
Year	Title	Credited as	Notes
1997	Providence	Writer	Unproduced film, developed for TriStar Pictures
2004	Superman: Flyby	Script doctor	Unproduced film, developed for Warner Bros., Directed by McG
2012	Fun Size	Director and producer	Produced by Fake Empire and Nickelodeon Movies

=== Television ===
Year	Title	Network	Credited as	Notes
2000	Brookfield	ABC	Creator, writer and producer	Unaired television pilot, Produced by ABC/Disney
2001	Wall to Wall Records	The WB	Creator, writer and producer	Unaired television pilot, Produced by Warner Bros. Television
2003–2007	The O.C.	Fox	Creator, writer, executive producer and showrunner	Nominated – 2004 WGA Award for Episodic Drama(for "Premiere")
2004	Alphabet City	Fox	Creator, writer and producer	Unproduced television pilot, Sold to and developed for Fox
2004	Athens	Fox	Creator, writer and producer	Unproduced television pilot, Sold to and developed for Fox
2007–2012	Chuck	NBC	Co-creator, writer, executive producer and co-showrunner	
2007–2012	Gossip Girl	The CW	Co-developer, writer, executive producer and co-showrunner	Based on the Gossip Girl series of books by Cecily von Ziegesar
2009	Valley Girls	The CW	Co-creator, writer and executive producer	Backdoor pilot: series not picked up, Proposed spin-off to Gossip Girl
2011	Ghost Angeles	NBC	Co-creator, writer and executive producer	Series not picked up
2011	Georgetown	ABC	Co-creator, writer and executive producer	Series not picked up
2011–2015	Hart of Dixie	The CW	Executive producer	
2013–2014	The Carrie Diaries	The CW	Executive producer	Based on the novel The Carrie Diaries by Candace Bushnell, Prequel series to HBO's Sex and the City
2013	Cult	The CW	Executive producer	
2015	The Astronaut Wives Club	ABC	Executive producer	Based on Lily Koppel's novel
2017–2022	Dynasty	The CW	Co-developer, writer and executive producer	Reboot of the 1980s series of the same name
2017–2019	Runaways	Hulu	Co-creator for television, writer, executive producer and co-showrunner	Based on the Marvel Comics superhero team of the same name Set in the Marvel Cinematic Universe (MCU)
2019–2023	Nancy Drew	The CW	Co-developer, writer and executive producer	Based on the Nancy Drew book series by Carolyn Keene
2019	Looking for Alaska	Hulu	Creator for television, writer, executive producer, director and showrunner	Miniseries; Based on the novel of the same name by John Green
2021–2023	Gossip Girl	HBO Max	Executive producer	Sequel series to The CW's Gossip Girl; Based on the Gossip Girl series of books by Cecily von Ziegesar
2022	Tom Swift	The CW	Executive Producer	Based on the Tom Swift series of books and also a spinoff series from Nancy Drew
2023	City on Fire	Apple TV+	Co-creator, writer and executive producer	Based on City on Fire by Garth Risk Hallberg
2026	Sterling Point	Amazon Prime Video	Executive Producer and co-showrunner	

=== Web ===
Year	Title	Site	Credited as
2009	Rockville, CA	TheWB.com	Series creator, writer and executive producer
2009	Gossip Girl: Chasing Dorota	The CW	Executive producer

== Bibliography ==
- Prigge, Steven (September 30, 2005). Created by: Inside the Minds of TV's Top Show Creators. Silman-James Press. ISBN 9781879505827.
