= Kelly Rutherford =

American actress

- Rutherford in 2023
- Born: November 6, 1968 (age 57); Elizabethtown, Kentucky, U.S.
- Occupation: Actress
- Years active: 1987–present
- Spouses: Carlos Tarajano (m. 2001; div. 2002) Daniel Giersch (m. 2006; div. 2010)
- Children: 2

Kelly Rutherford (born November 6, 1968) is an American actress. She is known for her television roles as Stephanie "Sam" Whitmore on the NBC daytime soap opera Generations (1989–1991), as Megan Lewis on the Fox primetime soap opera Melrose Place (1996–1999), and as Lily van der Woodsen on The CW series Gossip Girl (2007–2012).

== Early life and education ==
Kelly Rutherford was born in Elizabethtown, Kentucky, on November 6, 1968, the daughter of Ann Edwards. She has a brother, Anthony. She attended Corona del Mar High School in Newport Beach, California. She later studied at HB Studio in New York City, and the Beverly Hills Playhouse in California. She is of English, Scottish and Danish ancestry.

== Career ==
Rutherford began her career on daytime soap operas. She appeared on Loving in 1987, and later was cast as a regular on Generations from 1989 to 1991. In 1992 she joined the cast of the ABC drama Homefront.

From 1993 to 1994, Rutherford was a regular on the Fox series The Adventures of Brisco County, Jr. as Dixie Cousins, a saloon singer and con artist who has a brief romantic encounter with Brisco. In later episodes, Dixie becomes Brisco's primary love interest.

She also appeared in the film I Love Trouble. She also starred in the short-lived series The Great Defender as Frankie Collet (1995), and in Kindred: The Embraced as Caitlin Byrne (1996). In 1996, Rutherford joined the cast of Fox primetime soap opera Melrose Place, as Megan Lewis. She starred on the show until 1999.

She also starred as Christine Hamilton in the horror film Scream 3 (2000). From 2003 to 2004, she starred in the ABC drama Threat Matrix as Special Agent Frankie Ellroy Kilmer. In next television season she starred in another short-lived series, E-Ring, on NBC. In 2007, Rutherford began starring as Lily van der Woodsen in the CW series Gossip Girl. The series ended in 2012. Rutherford has also starred in a number of Lifetime movies. In 2016, Rutherford was cast in the ABC thriller Quantico playing the recurring role of Laura Wyatt. From 2018 to 2019, Rutherford played the recurring role of Melissa Daniels in the CW reboot series Dynasty.

== Personal life ==
Rutherford married Venezuelan banker Carlos Tarajano in June 2001. Rutherford filed for divorce in January 2002, after six months of marriage. The wedding was featured shortly thereafter in the February 2002 issue of InStyle magazine.

Rutherford married her second husband, German businessman Daniel Giersch, in August 2006. She gave birth to their first child, son Hermès Gustaf Daniel Giersch, in October 2006.

While pregnant with their second child, Rutherford filed for divorce from Giersch on December 30, 2008. Rutherford and Giersch subsequently became involved in a child custody dispute over their son and their unborn child. Rutherford gave birth to their second child, daughter Helena Grace, in June 2009.

In August 2009, Rutherford and Giersch reached a temporary settlement of joint physical custody, in effect until April 2010. Rutherford also obtained a temporary restraining order against him the following month.

Giersch's U.S. visa was revoked in April 2012, after Rutherford's lawyer informed the State Department about issues pertaining to Giersch's businesses, which led the department to conclude that it had sufficient evidence to deport him.

It has been reported that the allegations involved fraud or an involvement in drugs and weapons dealing in South America, considered terrorism under the PATRIOT Act. Giersch consequently was unable to enter the United States and took up residence in France and Monaco. In May 2012, Rutherford and Giersch's children went to France to spend the summer with their father. Rutherford asked the court to grant her sole custody so that she could keep the children primarily in the United States following their visit to France, as the existing joint custody agreement required her to travel frequently to enable Giersch to spend time with the children.

In August 2012, in a widely reported decision, a California Superior Court judge ruled that the 50/50 custody arrangement should remain and that, because Giersch is unable to travel to the United States, the children should live in France with him and attend school there, with Rutherford traveling there to visit them. Though Rutherford opposed the decision and requested a stay of proceedings while she appealed, her request was denied and it was ruled that, in two years, his eligibility to enter the United States and the consequent well-being of the children will be reassessed.

In June 2013, Rutherford filed for bankruptcy, stating she had debts of approximately $2 million, primarily due to the $1.5 million she spent on legal fees relating to the divorce and custody dispute with Giersch.

In May 2015, Rutherford was granted temporary sole custody of her children, following a ruling that both her son and daughter be brought back to the United States from Monaco, where they had been living with their father since 2012. On July 23, 2015, a California judge ruled that California did not have jurisdiction over Rutherford's child custody case because she resides in New York, and her former husband was again awarded custody.

Rutherford then filed a case in New York but on July 27, 2015, the New York court ruled it also did not have jurisdiction.

In December 2015, the Monaco courts reconfirmed that full custody remained with the children's father, with Rutherford granted extensive visitation rights in France and Monaco as well as shared input regarding "health, schooling, religious education, and any change of residence".

== Filmography ==
=== Film ===
Year	Title	Role	Notes
1988	Shakedown	TV watcher	
1989	Phantom of the Mall: Eric's Revenge	Salesgirl	
1994	Tis a Gift to Be Simple	Emily Hanover	Short film
1994	I Love Trouble	Kim	
1994	Amberwaves	Lola Barnes	
1997	Six Months of Darkness, Six Months of Light	Annie	Short film
1997	The Big Fall	Veronica	Direct-to-video film
1997	Dilemma	Woman in bar	Uncredited
1997	Cyclops, Baby	Randy	
1998	The Disturbance at Dinner	Marian Pronkridge	
2000	Scream 3	Christine Hamilton	
2000	The Chaos Factor	Jodi	
2001	The Tag	Wendy	
2002	Angels Don't Sleep Here	Kate Porter	
2002	Swimming Upstream	Sandra Bird	
2011	Still Screaming: The Ultimate Scary Movie Retrospective	Herself	Documentary film
2013	The Stream	Maggie Terry	
2017	Christmas Wedding Planner	Aunt Olivia	

=== Television ===
Year	Title	Role	Notes
1987	Loving	N/A	Unknown episodes
1989–1991	Generations	Stephanie "Sam" Whitmore	Unknown episodes
1992	Davis Rules	Erika	2 episodes
1992	Breaking the Silence	Cheryl	Television film
1992–1993	Homefront	Judy Owen	Main role (season 2)
1992	Bodies of Evidence	Diana Wallace	Episode: "Afternoon Delights"
1992	Bill & Ted's Excellent Adventures	Mona	Episode: "As the Dude Turns (The Lives That We Live)"
1993–1994	The Adventures of Brisco County, Jr.	Dixie Cousins	Recurring role, 7 episodes
1995	The Great Defender	Frankie Collett	Main role
1995	Courthouse	Christine Lunden	4 episodes
1996	Kindred: The Embraced	Caitlyn Byrne	Main role
1996	No Greater Love	Edwina Winfield	Television film
1996	Buried Secrets	Danielle Roff	Television film
1996–1999	Melrose Place	Megan Lewis Mancini	Main role (seasons 5–7); 90 episodes
1998	The Perfect Getaway	Julia Robinson	Television film
1999–2000	Get Real	Laura Martineau	4 episodes
1999	Nash Bridges	Roxanne "Roxie" Hill	Episode: "Kill Switch"
2000	Sally Hemings: An American Scandal	Lady Maria Cosway	Miniseries
2000	The Outer Limits	Rachel	Episode: "Nest"
2000–2001	The Fugitive	Helen Kimble	3 episodes
2001	Night Visions	Marilyn Lanier	Episode: "The Passenger List"
2001	Acceptable Risk	Kim Welles	Television film
2002–2003	The District	Deputy Mayor Melinda Lockhart	Recurring role, 6 episodes
2003–2004	Threat Matrix	Special Agent Frankie Ellroy-Kilmer	Main role
2005–2006	E-Ring	Samantha "Sonny" Liston	Main role
2007–2012	Gossip Girl	Lily van der Woodsen	Main role
2007	Tell Me No Lies	Laura Cooper	Television film
2013	A Sister's Nightmare	Jane Ryder	Television film
2014	Bones	Stephanie McNamara	Episode: "The Ghost in the Killer"
2014	Being Mary Jane	Cynthia Phillips	4 episodes
2014	Reckless	Joyce Reed	4 episodes
2015	The Mysteries of Laura	Lisa Hanlon	Episode: "The Mystery of the Popped Pugilist"
2015	Night of the Wild	Sara	Television film
2016	Quantico	Laura Wyatt	Episodes: "Care", "Right"
2016	Jane the Virgin	Editor	Episode: "Chapter Fifty"
2017	Nightcap	Herself	Episode: "What Would Staci Do?"
2017–2018	Gone	Paula Lannigan	6 Episodes
2018–2019	Dynasty	Melissa Daniels	7 episodes
2018	Love, of Course	Amy Andolini	Television film (Hallmark Channel)
2019	Pretty Little Liars: The Perfectionists	Claire Hotchkiss	Main role
2019	Dark Angel	Jillian	Television film
2019	Fallen Hearts	Jillian	Television film
2019	All My Husband's Wives	Cheryl Volberg	Television film
2020	Power Book II: Ghost	Colleen Saxe	Episode: "The Stranger"
