= Nicole Fiscella =

American actress

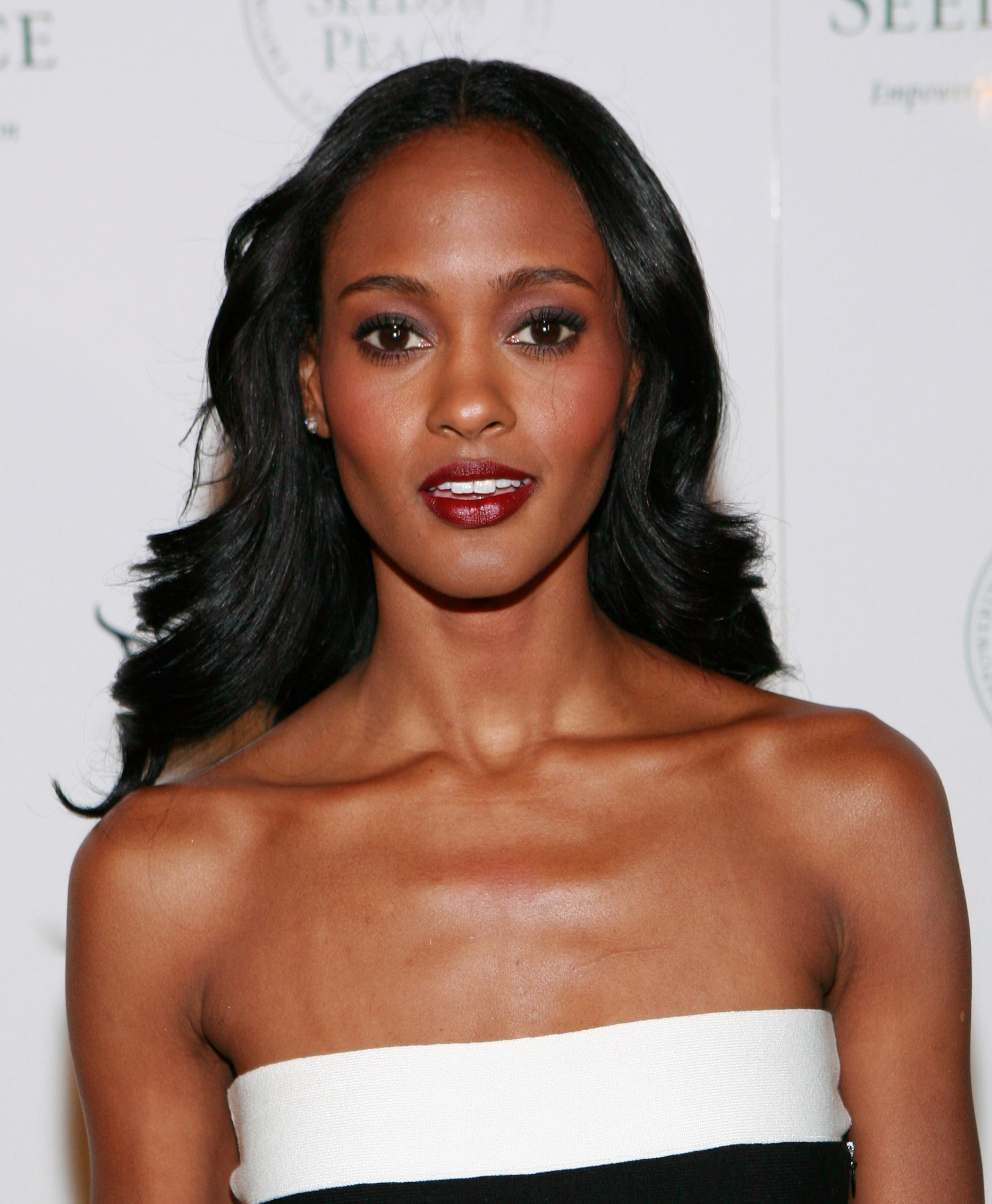
- Fiscella in 2009
- Born: September 15, 1979 (age 47); Rochester, New York, U.S.
- Occupations: Actress, former model
- Years active: 2005–present
- Children: 3

Nicole Fiscella (born September 15, 1979) is an American actress and model, best known for her role as Isabel Coates on The CW's teen drama television series Gossip Girl.

== Early life ==
Nicole Fiscella was born on September 15, 1979, either at the Lenox Hill Hospital in Lenox Hill, Manhattan or in Rochester, New York. She is of Indian and St Lucian ancestry. Her parents are physicians and she has a younger brother, Chaz. She grew up in Rochester. Fiscella was in the All-State Jazz Choir with director and political activist, Jim Augustine. Fiscella graduated from Tufts University with a Bachelor of Arts in Anthropology. She also has a Master's degree in Human Nutrition from the University of Bridgeport and is a certified nutritionist. When asked why she wanted to study Nutrition, by The New York Observer, Fiscella replied "Both of my parents are doctors, so we were always the health-nut family. I think I always wanted to do something in the medical field a little bit, but not as far as being a doctor, so this is a good median".

== Career ==
In 2005, Fiscella started her modeling career under New York Model Management. She has appeared in numerous fashion magazines, including Elle, Essence and Cosmopolitan, and featured in campaigns for J.Crew, Pantene, Banana Republic and GAP Body. She modeled for the Bobbi Brown Cosmetics' makeup manual.

Fiscella starred in seasons one, two and four in the role of Isabel Coates, a loyal friend of Blair Waldorf (played by Leighton Meester) in The CW's teen drama series Gossip Girl (2007–2011). The series revolved around the lives of privileged upper-class adolescents living in Manhattan's Upper East Side. She also starred as the Lead Girl in LL Cool J's music video for the song "Baby".

As of May 2020, Fiscella works as a certified nutritionist, and is also an active blogger and a lifestyle influencer on all things natural and nutrition. She runs "Global Go to Girl" blog, which includes healthy recipes and travel recommendations.

== Personal life ==
Fiscella lives in Colorado with her husband and three children.

== Filmography ==
Television roles
| Year | Title | Role | Notes |
|---|---|---|---|
| 2007–2011 | Gossip Girl | Isabel Coates | 29 episodes |
| 2010 | Luxury Unveiled | Herself | Episode: "Tiffany & Co." |

Music videos
| Year | Title | Artist | Role |
|---|---|---|---|
| 2008 | "Baby" | LL Cool J | Lead Girl |
