= The Last Days of Disco Stick =

- Gossip Girl episode
- Lady Gaga performs her song "Bad Romance"
- Episode no.: Season 3 Episode 10
- Directed by: Tony Wharmby
- Written by: Leila Gerstein
- Cinematography by: David M. Dunlap
- Editing by: Rachel Goodlett Katz
- Production code: 3X5160
- Original air date: November 16, 2009
- Running time: 42 minutes

Guest appearances
- Hilary Duff as Olivia Burke; Holley Fain as Maureen van der Bilt; Aaron Tveit as Tripp van der Bilt; Kevin Zegers as Damien Dalgaard; Lady Gaga as herself; Erich Bergen as Paul Hoffman; Kate Goehring as housekeeper; Megan Guinan as Willa Weinstein; Sonya Harum as Sophie; Ben Rauch as Tim; Benita Robledo as Amalia

Episode chronology
← Previous "They Shoot Humphreys, Don't They?"	Next → "The Treasure of Serena Madre"
- Gossip Girl season 3

"The Last Days of Disco Stick" is the 10th episode of the third season of the American teen drama television series Gossip Girl, and the 53rd episode overall. Written by Leila Gerstein and directed by Tony Wharmby, it originally aired on The CW on November 16, 2009. The episode features a cameo appearance and special performance by Lady Gaga, and marks the last appearance of Hilary Duff on the series.

== Plot ==
Serena (Blake Lively) continues to have chemistry with Tripp (Aaron Tveit). Serena knew that it was wrong and went to Nate (Chace Crawford) for help. Nate decides to not let Serena out of his sight until Tripp leaves for Washington D.C. the following day. They spend a lot of time together and some chemistry builds there. At a bar, Nate confesses he has always been in love with Serena and leans in to kiss her. As he does this, a distressed Tripp walks in and interrupts. He just learned that it wasn't their grandfather that set up the drowning man in the Hudson River on Election Day, but his wife. Now that his marriage has fallen through, Serena goes to comfort him. Nate urges her not to go, but she insists.

Things are awkward between Dan (Penn Badgley), Vanessa (Jessica Szohr), and Olivia (Hilary Duff) now after their threesome. Nate tells Dan that the third person should always be a stranger. Vanessa and Olivia fight over Dan's time and attention. They are all brought together by Blair (Leighton Meester) for a performance. Blair runs another one of her get popular schemes; to get in with the elite of Tisch School of the Arts. They hosted a gathering of actors and writers to perform a play based around pop culture: a modern-day Snow White using the music of Lady Gaga. Blair was originally not invited, but got Olivia to get her in with her connections.

Dan brings Vanessa in as the director of the play. Olivia and Vanessa vie for Dan's attention. During one of the scenes, Olivia calls out Dan for having a thing for Vanessa. She leaves, leaving Vanessa to fill in for her as Snow White. When Dan kisses Vanessa, he realizes that he's had feelings for her all along. Unfortunately, Vanessa is interested in some artsy guy from Tisch. Olivia decided to leave NYU, leaving Dan all alone.

Blair brought Lady Gaga on stage which really impressed her classmates. Meanwhile, Jenny (Taylor Momsen) has been hanging around New York City with one of Chuck's (Ed Westwick) clients, international drug dealer Damien Dalgaard (Kevin Zegers). She gets herself caught up in a drug exchange. Chuck steps in to save Jenny. Although, Jenny doesn't feel like she needs protection and texts Damien to hang out again.

== Production ==
The episode marks Hilary Duff's final appearance in the role as Olivia Burke after fulfilling the whole contract as a recurring character for the third season. Recording artist Lady Gaga makes a cameo appearance.

=== Fashion ===
Similar to most Gossip Girl episodes, "The Last Days of Disco Stick" drew heavily on fashion. Costume designer Eric Daman dressed Leighton Meester in a Theory coat, Vince leggings, a Chanel bag, Ralph Lauren hat and Manolo Blahniks. When styling Blair's more mature look, Daman stated, "I chose very sleek, very linear clothing...It's almost architectural in design." Daman drew on the character of Jenny, citing her preference for wearing "lots of vintage clothes like torn-up jeans and paint-splattered T-shirts." and dressed Momsen in an Alexander Wang jacket over a Topshop dress and Hue tights. Daman also cited musician Courtney Love as an inspiration for the character's style. When dressing Blake Lively, Daman considered Serena's confusion over her feelings for the married congressman and incorporated her character's outfit into the episode. "From a fashion standpoint, Serena is in a little bit of an identity crisis", Daman explained. InStyle praised her Serena in her Twenty8Twelve coat, Alice and Olivia dress, Hue tights, a Kotur bag, Stephen Dweck necklace and Manolo Blahniks, describing it as "perfectly put-together". Eric Daman praised Vanessa's growing confidence, commenting "She's becoming her own woman", and accessorized Vanessa's Diane von Fürstenberg coat and Nanette Lepore dress with American Apparel leggings, a L.A.M.B. bag and a bold blue Gemma Redux necklace.

== Reception ==
"The Last Days of Disco Stick" was watched by 2.24 million viewers. The episode received mixed reviews. Isabelle Carreau of TV Squad felt that the episode was very predictable, and that even though "the drama following the threesome was put center stage, yet it fell flat".
