= Pilot (No Ordinary Family) =

- No Ordinary Family episode
- Episode no.: Season 1 Episode 1
- Directed by: David Semel
- Story by: Greg Berlanti &; Jon Harmon Feldman
- Teleplay by: Jon Harmon Feldman
- Original air date: September 28, 2010

Episode chronology
← Previous —	Next → "No Ordinary Marriage"

"Pilot" is the first episode of the ABC series No Ordinary Family. The episode's teleplay was written by Jon Harmon Feldman, from a story by Greg Berlanti and Feldman. David Semel directed the episode, which was originally broadcast on September 28, 2010.

== Plot ==
An average, ordinary family, the Powells have been growing apart steadily thanks to Stephanie Powell's (Julie Benz) successful career as a research scientist and their kids becoming teenagers. Jim Powell (Michael Chiklis) is the only one who seems to notice. During a family vacation research trip (which Jim forced his family to take), the plane they are in crashes into a lake during a storm. The family safely returns home, but doesn't seem to be any closer to each other. Eventually, Jim, Stephanie, Daphne (Kay Panabaker) and JJ (Jimmy Bennett) discover that they have superpowers. Jim attempts to use his newly discovered invulnerability and strength to stop crime, but ends up being shot and injured by high calibre bullets. He eventually ends up revealing his newfound powers to his wife, who has discovered that she has superspeed. They eventually reconcile and have a heart to heart talk, finally admitting that their marriage needs help. Meanwhile, their daughter faces normal teenager issues, which are worsened with the arrival of her telepathy, enabling her to learn that her boyfriend is cheating on her. Initially distraught, she eventually accepts her new power. Meanwhile, JJ, who prior to the crash had a learning disability, suddenly becomes a genius. The episode ends with the family spending more time together, playing and Jim and Steph visiting a marriage counselor.

== Production ==
Part of the episode "Pilot" was filmed on location at the Amazon River.

== Reception ==
=== Ratings and viewership ===
A total of 10.70 million American viewers watched the pilot episode, placing third in its timeslot and first in family viewing. The episode was also watched by 2.07 million Canadian viewers, placing eleventh for that week.

=== Critical reception ===
The episode received mixed reviews from Zap2it. Chris Carabott of IGN gave the episode a 7.5 out of 10, stating "the show has a whimsical flair that's not hard to appreciate." Tim Goodman of the San Francisco Chronicle said, "There's lot of promise here, of drama, action, comedy, etc, all wrapped up in a family-friendly series." Review aggregator Metacritic gave the series a score of 65 out of 100, indicating generally favorable reviews based on 28 professional critics. Alessandra Stanley from The New York Times gave an average review, praising the fact that the show offers "calmer, more restrained fantasy about paranormal prowess" by combining shows like Heroes and Lost with the wholesome fantasy of Disney's The Incredibles and The Swiss Family Robinson, but concluded her review by saying that "it's not clear whether this series—a hybrid of family drama and graphic novel—can sustain interest once the premise is fully established".
