= Gossip Girl season 3 =

Gossip Girl
- Season 3
- DVD cover art
- Showrunners: Josh Schwartz; Stephanie Savage
- Starring: Blake Lively; Leighton Meester; Penn Badgley; Chace Crawford; Taylor Momsen; Ed Westwick; Jessica Szohr; Kelly Rutherford; Matthew Settle
- No. of episodes: 22

Release
- Original network: The CW
- Original release: September 14, 2009 – May 17, 2010

Season chronology
- ← Previous; Season 2 Next → Season 4

The third season of the American teen drama television series Gossip Girl premiered on The CW on September 14, 2009, and concluded on May 17, 2010, consisting of 22 episodes. Based on the novel series of the same name by Cecily von Ziegesar, the series was developed for television by Josh Schwartz and Stephanie Savage. The season premiered with 2.55 million viewers and a 1.4 Adults 18-49 rating, up 14% in viewers from its season two finale.

Overall, the season attracted an average of 2.02 million viewers tuning in each week, with a 1.1 rating in Adult 18–49.

== Synopsis ==
High school is officially over for Blair, Serena, Nate, Chuck, Dan, and Vanessa as they leave their carefree days behind and start the new chapter in their life: Adulthood. Still at Constance for their junior year, Jenny and Eric's friendship is tested as Jenny starts her duties as the new Queen of Constance. Chuck purchases The Empire Hotel. Vanessa's new friend Scott Rosson arrives and has a secret to share. Serena defers Brown and tries to find ways to make herself useful in Manhattan. Serena and Blair's friendship also gets tested as they grow and mature. Chuck and Blair are finally in a committed relationship but start question if it will work without any mind games. Nate and Serena and Dan and Vanessa begin dating but find that dating your best friend isn't without its complications. Serena's father William arrives back in town and reveals a secret about Lily. Rufus finds a final punishment for Jenny when she sends a Gossip Girl blast involving Dan and Serena's non-existent tryst, creating troubles for their relationships. Elsewhere, Georgina returns to the Upper East Side with a surprise for Dan, and Dorota goes into labor. Blair and Chuck separate, after he commits two unforgivable acts.

== Cast and characters ==
=== Main ===
- Blake Lively as Serena van der Woodsen
- Leighton Meester as Blair Waldorf
- Penn Badgley as Dan Humphrey
- Chace Crawford as Nate Archibald
- Taylor Momsen as Jenny Humphrey
- Ed Westwick as Chuck Bass
- Jessica Szohr as Vanessa Abrams
- Kelly Rutherford as Lily van der Woodsen
- Matthew Settle as Rufus Humphrey
- Kristen Bell as the voice of Gossip Girl (uncredited)

=== Recurring ===
- Joanna Garcia as Bree Buckley
- Connor Paolo as Eric van der Woodsen
- Chris Riggi as Scott Rosson
- Sebastian Stan as Carter Baizen
- Aaron Schwartz as Vanya
- Michelle Trachtenberg as Georgina Sparks
- Zuzanna Szadkowski as Dorota Kishlovsky
- Hilary Duff as Olivia Burke
- Matt Doyle as Jonathan Whitney
- Holley Fain as Maureen van der Bilt
- Aaron Tveit as Tripp van der Bilt III
- Kevin Zegers as Damien Dalgaard
- Margaret Colin as Eleanor Waldorf
- Caroline Lagerfelt as CeCe Rhodes
- Laura Harring as Elizabeth Fisher
- Sherri Saum as Holland Kemble
- Desmond Harrington as Jack Bass
- Wallace Shawn as Cyrus Rose

=== Guest ===
- Ashley Hinshaw as herself
- Tyra Banks as Ursula Nyquist
- Sonic Youth as themselves
- Gina Torres as Gabriela Abrams
- Albert Hammond Jr. as himself
- Lady Gaga as herself
- Robert John Burke as Bart Bass
- Willa Holland as Agnes Andrews
- Luke Kleintank as Elliot Leichter
- William Baldwin as William van der Woodsen

== Episodes ==
No. overall	No. in season	Title	Directed by	Written by	Original release date	U.S. viewers (millions)
44	1	"Reversals of Fortune"	J. Miller Tobin	Joshua Safran	September 14, 2009	2.55
As the summer is drawing to a close, Blair and Chuck are madly in love and adjusting to their new "in a relationship" status, breaking all traditional rules of dating as would be expected. Meanwhile, Serena returns from her European adventure with many secrets to hide and a new, but very complicated relationship with Carter Baizen. Nate returns from his travels with a mysterious brunette, Bree Buckley (Joanna Garcia) in town. With Lily away in California visiting her mother, Rufus, Dan, and Jenny spent the summer in the Hamptons, adjusting to the van der Woodsen's glamorous lifestyle surprisingly faster than any of them expected. Vanessa introduces her new boyfriend, Scott, to Dan and Rufus. Title reference: The 1990 film Reversal of Fortune.
45	2	"The Freshman"	Norman Buckley	Amanda Lasher	September 21, 2009	1.97
Blair, who is determined to maintain her "Queen Bee" status in college, embarks on her first day at New York University, along with Dan and Vanessa. Unfortunately, Georgina turns up as Blair's roommate in the dorms, determined to make Blair a social outcast. Serena begins to have second thoughts about going to Brown after her summer in Europe. Meanwhile, Nate and Bree decide to explore their relationship further, knowing full well it could cause tension between their families who are political rivals. In this episode, Leighton Meester's collaboration with Cobra Starship, "Good Girls Go Bad", is featured. Title reference: The 1990 film of the same name.
46	3	"The Lost Boy"	Jean de Segonzac	Robert Hull	September 28, 2009	2.36
An Upper East Side face-off ensues when Blair and Chuck both set their sights on a particular item up for bid at Sotheby's and the personal stakes are high. Meanwhile, Serena suspects that Carter may be up to his old habits with gambling and being not completely honest with her. Georgina takes an interest in Dan, and Vanessa begins to suspect that something is not quite right with Scott. Bree's true intentions with Nate are secretly revealed—having something to do with Carter and his gambling habit. Title reference: The 1987 film The Lost Boys.
47	4	"Dan de Fleurette"	Mark Piznarski	John Stephens	October 5, 2009	2.08
It is the first day of school at Constance Billard which means it is also time for Jenny to take her rightful place as the new Queen Bee. Unfortunately for Jenny, Blair is more than happy to intervene when news reaches her that she may be needed back at Constance. Meanwhile, Lily returns home to Rufus and her family to find that things are definitely not as she left them. A famous film actress, Olivia Burke (Hilary Duff), enrolls at NYU in hopes of having a somewhat normal college experience, and is assigned to be Vanessa's roommate. Tyra Banks appears as Ursula, an actress co-starring in Olivia's film and someone who Serena befriends when she is hired by Olivia's personal assistant for an upcoming film premiere. Title reference: The 1986 film Jean de Florette.
48	5	"Rufus Getting Married"	Ron Fortunato	Leila Gerstein	October 12, 2009	2.36
Lily and Rufus decide to move up their wedding day. Chuck discovers a secret that Carter has been keeping from Serena which involves Bree and the Buckleys. Dan and Vanessa are pulled into one of Georgina's schemes when she lures Scott back to New York on a ruse to break up Lily and Rufus. Also, Blair is suspicious of Bree and shares her concerns with Nate. Sonic Youth performs "Starpower" at the wedding reception. Title reference: The 2008 film Rachel Getting Married.
49	6	"Enough About Eve"	John Stephens	Jake Coburn	October 19, 2009	1.98
Vanessa, hoping to finally win her difficult activist mother Gabriela's (Gina Torres) approval, desperately vies with Blair for the honor of delivering the freshman toast at NYU. Meanwhile, Dan invites Olivia to meet Rufus and Lily, which leads to all sorts of problems for the new couple. Elsewhere, Serena and Nate team up to help Carter win money at a poker table to free him from his arrangement with the Buckleys. Title reference: The 1950 film All About Eve.
50	7	"How to Succeed in Bassness"	Joe Lazarov	Sara Goodman	October 26, 2009	2.31
In need of publicity for the opening of his new Empire Hotel, Chuck decides to move up the hotel's nightclub opening and enlists Serena's help to get the word out to her celebrity clients. Feeling left out of the planning, Blair attempts to win Chuck's approval by secretly helping him with a problem concerning the opening night. Meanwhile, Dan is unnerved when he finally watches one of Olivia's infamous sex scenes with co-star and real-life boyfriend at the time, Patrick Roberts (Simon Miller) in one of her films. Jenny is forced to choose between her relationship with Eric and her new role as Queen Bee of Constance Billiard. Elsewhere, Rufus gets Lily into the Halloween spirit by taking her out to a costume party. Albert Hammond Jr. makes a short cameo as himself. Title reference: The 1967 film How to Succeed in Business Without Really Trying.
51	8	"The Grandfather: Part II"	Mark Piznarski	Lenn K. Rosenfeld	November 2, 2009	1.98
Olivia says something she regrets during her appearance on Jimmy Fallon's talk show and tries to keep Dan from finding out. With election day around the corner, Nate suspects his grandfather will stop at nothing to get his cousin Tripp (Aaron Tveit) elected to congress. In the midst of another feud with Serena, Blair befriends a new "it" girl and takes her to an election night party at Chuck's hotel, hoping to make Serena jealous. Meanwhile, Vanessa becomes upset with Nate because of his schemes during the election. Title reference: The 1974 film The Godfather Part II.
52	9	"They Shoot Humphreys, Don't They?"	Alison Maclean	Amanda Lasher	November 9, 2009	2.37
Not satisfied with just being Queen of Constance Billard, Jenny sets her sights on becoming the Queen of all the Upper East Side by landing the hottest escort for cotillion. Meanwhile, Nate and Chuck plot to help Serena and Blair repair their damaged friendship by intentionally trapping them inside an elevator. Dan is upset when Olivia contemplates leaving school for a film project, so he and Vanessa take her out on the town with a list of all the things that a university would make up—including a threesome. Blair and Eric plan to dethrone Jenny at cotillion. Blair enlists Kira Abernathy (Sarah Steele) to take her down and become the new queen of Constance Billard. Jonathan, upset at Eric's scheming with Blair, breaks up with him. In this episode, Meester's song "Somebody to Love" featuring Robin Thicke is introduced. Title reference: The 1969 film They Shoot Horses, Don't They?
53	10	"The Last Days of Disco Stick"	Tony Wharmby	Leila Gerstein	November 16, 2009	2.24
Hoping to impress the elitist theater kids at NYU, Blair sets her sights on landing a private concert with the hottest musical performer of the year, Lady Gaga. Dan and Olivia sign up to write and star in a school play, based on an idea by Blair and directed by Vanessa which leads to more quarreling between all involved. With Blair out of the picture, Serena turns to Nate to help her get through a difficult situation when she begins falling for Tripp despite the fact that is he still married. As a favor to Chuck, Jenny agrees to hang out with Damien (Kevin Zegers), the son of an ambassador who is staying at Chuck's hotel, but the experience proves to be a lot more intriguing than she expected. Title reference: The 1998 film The Last Days of Disco and the 2008 song "LoveGame" by Lady Gaga.
54	11	"The Treasure of Serena Madre"	Mark Piznarski	Robert Hull & Joshua Safran	November 30, 2009	2.23
Blair suspects her mother, Eleanor, has been keeping a big secret from her, but it turns out to be something else entirely. Vanessa is supposed to spend Thanksgiving with her parents, but has a fight with her estranged mother and shows up on Dan's doorstep. Meanwhile, Rufus learns that Lily has been lying to him about her mother, Cece (Caroline Lagerfelt), and of her whereabouts for the summer. Chuck tells Nate that he has some potentially damaging information about one of their friends. Jenny learns that Eric was behind her very public embarrassment at cotillion and cannot pass up a chance to get even. Serena is put in a very awkward position when her mother invites Tripp and his wife Maureen to join them for Thanksgiving dinner at their penthouse. Title reference: The 1948 film The Treasure of the Sierra Madre.
55	12	"The Debarted"	Jason Ensler	Stephanie Savage	December 7, 2009	2.21
On the first anniversary of Bart Bass' death, Chuck wrestles with the dilemma of following his conscience, or that of his father. Serena runs away with Tripp where they hide out at his cottage on Long Island. During Tripp and Serena's drive back to New York, an argument between them brings a terrible tragedy when Serena is seriously injured in a car accident and Tripp flees from the scene. Back in New York, Dan and Vanessa attempt to navigate their newly complicated friendship when Dan seeks a new potential relationship with one of Vanessa's friends. Elsewhere, Eric and Kira make work his plan to dethrone Jenny. The relationship between Lily and Rufus deteriorates even more when he discovers the letter from Serena's father. Title reference: The 2006 film The Departed.
56	13	"The Hurt Locket"	Tony Wharmby	Sara Goodman	March 8, 2010	1.74
Now back together, Nate and Serena decide to explore the boundaries of their new relationship. Meanwhile, Blair suspects that Chuck is having trouble forgetting about the mysterious woman he saw at his father's grave. Serena asks to accompany Damien to a State Dinner, but is unaware that he needs her help with a drug exchange. Things are complicated when Jenny and Nate crash the event and Serena inadvertently acquires Jenny's coat with the contraband stash sewed into it. Elsewhere, Dan and Vanessa attempt to move past the awkwardness of Dan's confession of love. Rufus returns from a ski trip and tries his best to avoid Lily whom he suspects was unfaithful. Title reference: The 2009 film The Hurt Locker.
57	14	"The Lady Vanished"	Andrew McCarthy	Amanda Lasher & Robert Hull	March 15, 2010	1.73
Rufus and Lily grow angrier and more suspect of Jenny's relationship with Damien in which Jenny decides to rebel by revealing Damien's drug-dealing profession. Meanwhile, Chuck confides in Blair, Serena, and Nate about his investigation into the mysterious woman, Elizabeth Fisher, who may or may not be his mother. Elsewhere, Dan and Vanessa struggle through the awkwardness of dating other people when they attend a college beach party with their respective dates. Serena makes a decision regarding finding her father after having a talk with Chuck's mother. Title reference: The 1938 film The Lady Vanishes.
58	15	"The Sixteen Year Old Virgin"	Wendey Stanzler	Leila Gerstein	March 22, 2010	1.90
Despite being grounded, Jenny continues to secretly see Damien who tells Jenny that he wants to have sex with her. Meanwhile, Lily tells Rufus the big secret she has been keeping from him even though she knows it is a huge risk. Dan and Vanessa explore a new stage of their romantic relationship. Serena and Nate have an argument about their past events. Chuck is forced to make an extremely difficult decision about transferring ownership of his hotel to Elizabeth when a lawsuit is served against him by female employees for sexual harassment, as his devious uncle, Jack Bass (Desmond Harrington), returns to New York with an agenda. Title reference: The 2005 film The 40-Year-Old Virgin.
59	16	"The Empire Strikes Jack"	Joe Lazarov	Jake Coburn	March 29, 2010	1.69
Chuck finds himself once again at odds with Jack when Chuck learns that his mother, Elizabeth, is in fact a con artist in love with Jack and she betrays Chuck by having him sign ownership the hotel over to Jack. Meanwhile, Eleanor (Margaret Colin) puts Blair in charge of making sure her latest fashion show is a huge success with an important client. Rufus attempts to get Jenny back on track by volunteering to have her help with Eleanor's fashion show, but the opportunity takes a big turn for the worse when Jenny learns that her old friend-turned-bitter enemy, Agnes (Willa Holland), will be one of the models, and who seeks revenge against Jenny. When Jenny is drugged and left by Agnes at a gentleman's club, Jenny calls on Nate to rescue her. Elsewhere, Dan and Vanessa announce their newfound romance to everyone and try to have a real date when Vanessa tries to cook dinner at the Humphrey loft. Title reference: The 1980 film The Empire Strikes Back.
60	17	"Inglourious Bassterds"	Jean de Segonzac	Lenn K. Rosenfeld	April 5, 2010	1.74
Chuck and Blair are faced with the most difficult decision they have ever faced as a couple when Jack tells Blair that she has to sleep with him for Chuck to get the hotel back. Blair reluctantly agrees, before Jack reveals to her that Chuck organized it. Meanwhile, Serena plans a surprise birthday party for Nate, but Jenny does her best to sabotage Serena's efforts by keeping Nate away and tries to make a move onto him. Elsewhere, Dan and Vanessa's new relationship hits a bump in the road, when they have to evaluate each other's work. Title reference: The 2009 film Inglourious Basterds.
61	18	"The Unblairable Lightness of Being"	Janice Cooke-Leonard	Jeanne Leitenberg	April 12, 2010	1.86
Chuck offers to throw a wedding for a very pregnant Dorota who insists that she and Vanya have a traditional wedding before her parents arrive from Poland and find their daughter pregnant and without a husband. Dorota asks Blair and Chuck to be part of the ceremony and walk her down the aisle while Blair's mother Eleanor, and her stepfather Cyrus, also step in to help out. Meanwhile, Serena tells Nate she is having breakfast with the Humphreys when in reality she is secretly meeting up with Carter Baizen. Rufus discovers that Lily has been lying to him about her whereabouts. In this episode, Leighton Meester's song "Your Love Is a Drug" is featured. Title reference: The 1988 film The Unbearable Lightness of Being.
62	19	"Dr. Estrangeloved"	Darnell Martin	Robert Hull	April 26, 2010	2.05
When Lily's ex-husband, Dr. William van der Woodsen (William Baldwin), shows up unexpectedly in Manhattan, Serena finally gets the reunion she has so desperately wanted with her father, but the circumstances turn out to be far from ideal when Will reveals a secret of Lily's ailing health. When Serena and Nate continue to have relationship issues, a scheming Jenny is more than happy to be a shoulder for Nate to lean on. Meanwhile, Dan finds out that he did not get accepted into the Tisch writing program and Vanessa admits she may have been somewhat responsible by acquiring the spot that Dan wanted in the first place. Title reference: The 1964 film Dr. Strangelove.
63	20	"It’s a Dad, Dad, Dad World"	Jeremiah Chechik	Amanda Lasher	May 3, 2010	1.74
Will's return to the Upper East Side continues to stir up problems for Serena, Lily, and his long-standing rival, Rufus. Meanwhile, Serena and Jenny's relationship is strained as a result of Jenny's deception over Nate. Blair spends time on the Columbia University campus and realizes where she truly belongs. Dan learns that Vanessa has been keeping yet another secret from him when she informs him that she has decided to leave town for more international activist work in Haiti. Elsewhere, Chuck struggles with the idea of Lily's sickness while he continues to try to make up with Blair. Title reference: The 1964 film It's a Mad, Mad, Mad World.
64	21	"Ex-Husbands and Wives"	Norman Buckley	Sara Goodman	May 10, 2010	1.79
When things get tense between Rufus and Will, Serena chooses to stand behind her father, making Rufus feel like an outsider in his own family. Jenny and Chuck team up to try to find out what Will is hiding, while Blair joins forces with Dan and Nate to find out why a psychiatrist claims that Rufus had sex with her. After many failed attempts, Chuck makes one last grand gesture to reconcile with Blair, hoping she will finally accept the fact that they are destined to be together. Elsewhere, Jenny deliberately withholds information from everyone concerning Will's intentions, and then later shares information with Will that may ultimately destroy Lily and Rufus' marriage. Title reference: The 1992 film Husbands and Wives.
65	22	"Last Tango, Then Paris"	J. Miller Tobin	Joshua Safran & Stephanie Savage	May 17, 2010	1.96
Rufus finds a final punishment for Jenny when she sends a Gossip Girl blast involving Dan and Serena's non-existent tryst, creating troubles for their relationships. Elsewhere, Georgina returns to the Upper East Side from her enforced exile in Europe to tell Dan she is pregnant with his baby. Blair gets delayed when Dorota goes into labor and accompanies her to the hospital while Eleanor and Cyrus are also there to lend moral support. As a result of being delayed, Blair misses her date with Chuck. A heartbroken Chuck, mistakenly thinking that Blair does not love him anymore, finds a lonely Jenny, as they spend the night together. Afterwards, a guilt-ridden Jenny confides in Eric about her meaningless tryst, who then tells Dan. Chuck is then in the middle of proposing to Blair, when Dan comes and punches him, and Blair immediately finds out that Jenny and Chuck slept together. Blair tells Jenny never to set foot in Manhattan ever again. At the end, Blair and Serena leave for Paris while Dan is left by himself. Jenny is sent to live with her mother in Hudson. In Prague, two thugs steal a ring that Chuck was going to give to Blair; he struggles and ends up getting shot and left to die in an alley. Title reference: The 1972 film Last Tango in Paris.

== Ratings ==
The third season premiere was watched by 2.55 million viewers, with a rating and share of 1.7/3 in households and 1.4/3 in the 18-49 demographic.

In the Live + DVR Ratings the series has a larger increase. The third episode of the season, "The Lost Boy", in its original airing, it was watched by 2.36 million viewers, but with the DVR Ratings the episode scores nearly 3.0 million viewers. The fifth episode was watched by 2.36 million viewers on live broadcast, but with the DVR ratings, the episode scores 2.94 million viewers.

This is the least-watched season to date, with an average of 2.02 million viewers tuning in each week and a 1.1 rating in Adult 18–49, which was down 18% in total viewers from the previous season's 2.48 million, but up 0.2 in Adults 18-49.

== DVD release ==
Gossip Girl: The Complete Third Season
Set Details		Special Features	
22 Episodes (1 extended); 6-Disc Set; English (Dolby Surround 5.1); French (Dolby Surround 2.0); Subtitles in English SDH, Spanish, French, Portuguese, Chinese and Indonesian; Runtime: 951 minutes		Gossip Girl Mode: Interactive and Extended Viewing Experience on Episode 16, "The Empire Strikes Jack"; Featurette - A Gossip Girl Fabulous Affair: Throwing a Party Gossip Girl-Style; Music Videos: Lady Gaga - "Bad Romance"; Plastiscines - "Bitch"; Gag Reel; Unaired Scenes	
Release Dates
Region 1	Region 2	Region 3	Region 4
August 24, 2010	August 23, 2010	October 2, 2010	September 1, 2010 (Australia); November 4, 2010 (Brazil)
