= Katrina Begin =

American actress (born 1982)

- Born: August 10, 1982 (age 43); Minneapolis, Minnesota, U.S.
- Occupation: Actress
- Years active: 2004–present
- Spouse: Michael Masini
- Children: Floyd, Otis

Katrina Begin (born August 10, 1982 in Minneapolis, Minnesota) is an American actress. She is widely known for her role as Sylvia in the 2007 film Remember the Daze. In television, she appeared in the TV movie Second Chance Christmas and guest starred on Grounded for Life, E-Ring, ER, Gossip Girl, The Protector, After Lately and had a four-episode on No Ordinary Family from 2010 to 2011, as well as appearing in the films Legacy (2008) and Zookeeper (2011).

== Filmography ==
=== Film ===
Year	Title	Role	Notes
2007	Walk the Talk	Leslie	
2007	Remember the Daze	Sylvia	
2008	Legacy	Rachel	Video; AKA, Pretty Little Devils
2008	Hummingbird	Stella	Short
2011	Zookeeper	Secretary at TGIF	
2014	The Announcement	Jada	Short
2015	Life in Color	Erin	
2015	Merry Little Christmas	Nancy	Short
2017	Dirty Lies	Chloe	
2017	Americons	Gladys	
2019	The Missing Sister	Sharon	Filming
2020	Psycho Party Planner	Lindy Shores	Completed
2020	The Secret: Dare to Dream	Jennifer	
2021	King Richard	Anne Worcester	Filming

=== Television ===
Year	Title	Role	Notes
2004	Grounded for Life	Nikki	Episode: "Pressure Drop"
2005	E-Ring	Lila Sutter	Episode: "Weekend Pass"
2007	ER	Ginger	Episode: "Photographs and Memories"
2009	Gossip Girl	Aubrey	Episode: "The Lost Boy"
2010	The Agency	Jenny	Main role
2010–11	No Ordinary Family	Bailey Browning	Guest role
2011	The Protector	Meadow Bolton	Episode: "Safe"
2011	After Lately	Ashley	Episode: "Finding Jordan"
2014	The Haunted	Annie	Episode: "Pilot"
2015	Whiplash	Darla	Episodes: "Pilot", "Pat Me Down"
2016	Devious Maids	Kiersten	Episode: "A Time to Spill"
2016	Boomtown	Various	TV series
2017	Rebel	Hannah Bryant	Episode: "Just Us"
2017	Second Chance Christmas	Caroline	TV film
2017	Good Behavior	Savannah	Episode: "It's No Fun If It's Easy"
2018	A Mother's Greatest Fear	Alice Gould	TV film
2018	Christmas Break-In	Barbi	TV film
2023	NCIS: Los Angeles	Lauren Olsen	Episode: "Best Seller"
2024	S.W.A.T.	Devon Bailey	Episode: "Last Call"
