= Lovelife =

- Directed by: Jon Harmon Feldman
- Written by: Jon Harmon Feldman
- Produced by: Fuller French; Todd Hoffman
- Starring: Saffron Burrows; Sherilyn Fenn; Carla Gugino; Matt Letscher; Jon Tenney; Bruce Davison
- Cinematography: Tony C. Jannelli
- Edited by: Samuel Craven
- Music by: Adam Fields
- Distributed by: Trimark Pictures
- Release date: April 1997
- Running time: 96 minutes
- Country: United States
- Language: English

Lovelife is a 1997 American romantic comedy film written and directed by Jon Harmon Feldman. The ensemble cast includes Matt Letscher, Sherilyn Fenn, Saffron Burrows, Carla Gugino, Bruce Davison, Jon Tenney and Peter Krause.

Lovelife was nominated for a Feature Film Award at the 1997 Austin Film Festival and won an Audience Award at the Los Angeles Independent Film Festival. The film was the winner of the screenplay award at the L.A. Indie fest.

== Plot ==
An aspiring writer, Zoey, and her boyfriend, Danny, have a hot-and-cold relationship which is put in jeopardy when Danny's longtime friend, Amy, professes her love for him. Zoey is also involved with a professor, Alan, who lives with the airheaded Molly, who in turn has eyes for a mature professor, Bruce.
