= They Shoot Humphreys, Don't They? =

- Gossip Girl episode
- Dan, Vanessa and Olivia kiss each other
- Episode no.: Season 3 Episode 09
- Directed by: Alison Maclean
- Written by: Amanda Lasher
- Production code: 309
- Original air date: November 9, 2009

Guest appearances
- Matt Doyle as Jonathan Whitney; Hilary Duff as Olivia Burke; Sarah Steele as Kira Abernathy; Aaron Tveit as Tripp van der Bilt; Connor Paolo as Eric van der Woodsen; Meg McCrossen as Jane Trapp; Chanel Farrell as Sawyer Bennett

Episode chronology
← Previous "The Grandfather: Part II"	Next → "The Last Days of Disco Stick"
- Gossip Girl season 3

"They Shoot Humphreys, Don't They?" is the 52nd episode of the CW television series, Gossip Girl. It was also the ninth episode of the show's third season. The episode was written by Amanda Lasher and directed by Alison MacLean. The episode was considered very polemic according to the Parents Television Council. It originally aired on Monday, November 9, 2009, on the CW.

== International titles ==
Spain: A muerte contra los Humphrey (To Death Against the Humphreys)

== Reception ==
"They Shoot Humphreys, Don't They?" received generally mixed reviews from critics. Jacob, from Television Without Pity, had said that the episode had remind him of the series’ first season due to Jenny's storylines, by comparing to the time "when the steps were stairs, when the girls had plans beyond getting their knives out; when the dresses were white – and what Cotillion means: 'Couture, quadrilles and cutthroat competition'". Enid Portuguez, from the Los Angeles Times, was raged about the way the so polemic threesome ended up to be and who were the characters involved in the threesome by saying that "it was purposefully cliche - freshman year, two roommates, the roommate's boyfriend, shots of tequila. All they needed was a futon bed and a guy passed out in the corner to make that scenario truly realistic". Although, he praised Hilary Duff's performances in the episode by giving a positive review to the actress "involvement in adult roles", and had wished that her character would have a "bitchy side".

The episode had increased ratings due to the threesome storyline, involving the characters Dan Humphrey, Vanessa Abrams, and Olivia Burke, portrayed by Penn Badgley, Jessica Szohr, and Hilary Duff respectively. This episode caused a significant amount of controversy. Parent groups urged the CW not to air the episode that contained a threesome. The preview for the episode revolved around an "OM3" theme. CW ignored these requests and announced that it was going to air the episode as planned.

== Notes ==
- The title comes from the 1935 novel They Shoot Horses, Don't They?, 1969 film They Shoot Horses, Don't They? and the Gilmore Girls episode "They Shoot Gilmores, Don't They?".
- When Jenny is looking for an escort for the Cotillion, she is handed a mobile which displays the Facebook profile of Colby Shrefler. In 2007–08, he was a location assistant in 15 episodes of the show.
- The place of the first rehearsal for the Cotillion is the Cedar Lake Contemporary Ballet, a company based at 547 West 26th Street in New York City. The company was named one of Dance Magazine's "25 to Watch" in 2008.
