= The Freshman (Gossip Girl) =

- Gossip Girl episode
- Episode no.: Season 3 Episode 2
- Directed by: Norman Buckley
- Written by: Amanda Lasher
- Original air date: September 21, 2009

Guest appearances
- Connor Paolo as Eric van der Woodsen; Zuzanna Szadkowski as Dorota Kishlovsky; Michelle Trachtenberg as Georgina Sparks; Sebastian Stan as Carter Baizen; Joanna Garcia as Bree Buckley; Chris Riggi as Scott Rosson; Benita Robledo as Amalia; Elena Hurst as Katie

Episode chronology
← Previous "Reversals of Fortune"	Next → "The Lost Boy"
- Gossip Girl season 3

"The Freshman" is the 45th episode of the CW television series Gossip Girl. It was also the second episode of the show's third season. The episode was written by Amanda Lasher and directed by Norman Buckley. It originally aired on Monday, September 21, 2009 on the CW.

"The Freshman" shows Blair Waldorf (Leighton Meester) plotting to establish her 'Queen Bee' status in college as embarks on her first day at NYU, along with Dan Humphrey (Penn Badgley) and Vanessa Abrams (Jessica Szohr). Georgina Sparks (Michelle Trachtenberg) turns up as Blair's roommate in the dorms, determined to make her a social outcast. Rather than depart for Brown, Serena van der Woodsen (Blake Lively) decides to stay in New York and moves in with Chuck Bass (Ed Westwick) until she incites a major fallout between the two. Intending to get even, she recruits Chuck's enemy, Carter Baizen (Sebastian Stan). Meanwhile, Nate Archibald (Chace Crawford) and Bree Buckley (Joanna Garcia) decide to explore their relationship further, knowing full well it could cause tension between their families who are political rivals.

== Production ==
Leighton Meester's duet with Cobra Starship "Good Girls Go Bad" was utilized as background music in the hotel rooftop scene. The song had been released earlier in the year.

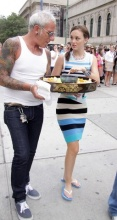
Leighton Meester on the set of the episode's shooting near the Metropolitan Museum of Art in New York City in July 2009

== Reception ==
"The Freshman" was watched by 1.97 million viewers and received mixed reviews.

Michelle Graham from Film School Rejects reviewed the episode. "Despite a low quality start to the season, this episode certainly went a long way towards redeeming that slip. Blair and Chuck’s move from unstable pair playing games to stay fresh to a couple that support each other through the rough patches was very plausible, showing a strength to the relationship that we’ve seen flashes of up til now." Graham praised Georgina's return, stating that how the character "brought some humour and extra life" to the episode. On reviewing other characters, Graham found Serena and Chuck's storyline "predictable and dull" and was not on par with other story lines in the episode. Graham continued on to negatively reviewing the relationship between Nate and Bree but was surprised by Dan's storyline. "Happily, Dan’s meteoric rise to the top of the college social food chain was unexpected and had some enjoyable results, not to mention shockingly stupid."
