= Enough About Eve =

- Gossip Girl episode
- Vanessa stealing Blair's spotlight.
- Episode no.: Season 3 Episode 6
- Directed by: John Stephens
- Written by: Jake Coburn
- Production code: 306
- Original air date: October 19, 2009

Guest appearances
- Neal Bledsoe as Josh Ellis; Hilary Duff as Olivia Burke; Shane McRae as PJ Buckley; Sebastian Stan as Carter Baizen; Gina Torres as Gabriela Abrams

Episode chronology
← Previous "Rufus Getting Married"	Next → "How to Succeed in Bassness"
- Gossip Girl season 3

"Enough About Eve" is the 49th episode of the CW television series, Gossip Girl. It was also the sixth episode of the show's third season. The episode was written by Jake Conburn and directed by John Stephens. It originally aired on Monday, October 19, 2009 on the CW.

== Plot ==
Vanessa and Blair go to war over delivering the freshman toast at NYU. Meanwhile; Dan invites Olivia to meet Rufus and Lily. While Serena and Nate team up to free Carter from the Buckley's.

== Reception ==
"Enough About Eve" achieved a 1.1 in Adults 18-49 and a 2.5 rating in its target Women 18-34 demo. It was also seen by 1.98 million viewers.

The episode received mixed to negative reviews from critics. L.J. Gibbs, from TV Fanatic, had said that even though the main stories for the episode had involved "lying, deceit and plot twists", which usually happens on the series, in this case "it was ever-so-slightly disappointing and actually felt quite a bit forced". He gave the episode a negative review by saying that the show had played itself out with this episode, where everything happens to make no sense (Chuck kissing a man, Nate helping Carter, Carter dumping Serena). Enid Portuguez, from the Los Angeles Times, had, however, gave the episode a mixed review by saying that it was obvious since from the beginning that neither Vanessa and Blair would get to do the speech, failing their plans, and praised Kelly Rutherford's acting in the episode by saying that Rufus and Lily "are getting cuter with each episode" and mentioning a fun line between Lily and Blair.
