= Brett Claywell =

American actor

- Born: Brett Quillen Claywell; April 11, 1978 (age 48); Greensboro, North Carolina, U.S.
- Occupation: Actor
- Years active: 2001–present
- Spouse: Tamera De Kauwe
- Children: 2

Brett Quillen Claywell (born April 11, 1978, Greensboro, North Carolina) is an American actor best known for playing the roles of Tim Smith on The WB/CW series One Tree Hill, and Kyle Lewis on the ABC soap opera One Life to Live.

== Biography ==
Claywell may be best-known for his portrayal of young medical student Kyle Lewis on ABC’s long-running daytime series, One Life to Live. He earned critical acclaim and national recognition, as well as a GLAAD award, for his turn as one of daytime’s most talked about actors of 2010.

Claywell began acting at a young age, starting his acting career in the Children’s theater in his hometown of Greensboro, North Carolina. He continued performing on the stage all the way up through college, where he studied theater at North Carolina State University while also earning a degree in Architecture. While at NC State he was a member of the Phi Delta Theta fraternity. Following his graduation, he moved to Wilmington, North Carolina to pursue a life as an actor. After a few brief appearances on the WB’s Dawson’s Creek, he won a role in the pilot of the CW’s One Tree Hill. He portrayed "Tim Smith" for three seasons on the show. He appeared in numerous episodes of the 2009 Joss Whedon show Dollhouse on FOX, where he appeared along lead actress Eliza Dushku. Claywell has made appearances in films, including The Final Season (in 2007), where he co-starred with Sean Astin, Powers Boothe, Rachael Leigh Cook and Michael Angarano.

In 2010, he ran his first New York City Marathon to raise money for an organization, which through soccer raises HIV and AIDS awareness in Africa. In 2011 he launched a website called 'Brett Claywell Photography'. In 2018 he was executive producing a basketball series titled "Streetball Stories".

== Personal life ==
Claywell has two older siblings: a brother, Christopher, and a sister, Traci. Claywell is married to Tamara De Kauwe, with whom he has a son, Phoenix Harper Claywell and a daughter.

== Filmography ==
Film
Year	Title	Role	Notes
2002–03	Dawson's Creek	Dancer & Set P.A.	2 episodes
2003–08	One Tree Hill	Tim Smith	Recurring role (33 episodes)
2004	20 Funerals	Hughes	
2004	Stateside	Marine, Company 1021	
2005	Strike The Tent	Union Soldier	Scenes deleted
2007	Senior Skip Day	Carl Smith	
2007	The Final Season	Patrick Iverson	
2008	Babysitter Wanted	Hal	Post-production
2008	Legacy	Jeff Cook	Also known as Pretty Little Devils
2009	Dollhouse	Matt	Recurring role (3 episodes)
2009–10	One Life to Live	Kyle Lewis	Main Role (97 episodes)
