= The Lost Boy (Gossip Girl) =

- Gossip Girl episode
- Episode no.: Season 3 Episode 3
- Directed by: Jean de Segonzac
- Written by: Robert Hull
- Production code: 303
- Original air date: September 28, 2009

Guest appearances
- Connor Paolo as Eric van der Woodsen; Michelle Trachtenberg as Georgina Sparks; Joanna Garcia as Bree Buckley; Sebastian Stan as Carter Baizen; Chris Riggi as Scott Rosson; Katrina Begin as Aubrey

Episode chronology
← Previous "The Freshman"	Next → "Dan de Fleurette"
- Gossip Girl season 3

"The Lost Boy" is the 46th episode of the CW television series, Gossip Girl. It was also the third episode of the show's third season. The episode was written by Robert Hull and directed by Jean de Segonzac. It originally aired on Monday, September 28, 2009 on the CW.

"The Lost Boy" shows Blair Waldorf (Leighton Meester) and Chuck Bass (Ed Westwick) plotting against each other when a particular item up for bid at Sotheby's raises their personal interests. Serena van der Woodsen (Blake Lively) suspects Carter Baizen's (Sebastian Stan) return to his old habits while Georgina Sparks (Michelle Trachtenberg) sets her sights on Dan Humphrey (Penn Badgley). Secrets are uncovered as Vanessa Abrams (Jessica Szohr) finds that Scott Rosson (Chris Riggi) is Lily and Rufus's real son and Bree Buckley's (Joanna Garcia) intentions with Nate Archibald (Chace Crawford) are revealed.

In the ending scenes, the song Animal by Miike Snow was used.

== Plot ==
An Upper East Side face-off ensues when Blair and Chuck both set their sights on a particular item up for bid at Sotheby's and the personal stakes are high. Meanwhile, Serena suspects that Carter may be up to his old habits with gambling and being not completely honest with her. Georgina takes an interest in Dan, and Vanessa begins to suspect that something is not quite right with Scott. Bree's true intentions with Nate are secretly revealed—having something to do with Carter and his gambling habit.

== Fashion ==
A scene in the episode shows Blair and Serena in a catch-up session in Central Park. Blair wore a Diane von Furstenberg top, a Vince skirt and Valentino bag. Serena, in a Matthew Williamson dress and Treesje bag for a catch-up session. Lively later wore a Matthew Williamson vest, Joie blouse and Rag & Bone skirt when filming the final scene of the episode where Serena meets up with Carter Baizen. Jessica Szohr was dressed a JMM blouse for a scene involving the guest star Chris Riggi's character, Scott Rosson.

== Cultural Allusions ==
- Title comes from the 1987 movie The Lost Boys.

== Reception ==
"The Lost Boy" received mixed reviews from critics. Michelle Graham from Film School Rejects negatively reviewed the character of Scott and his actor, Chris Riggi, noting his lack of presence "[...] if his storyline this week wasn’t so fundamental to the progression of the rest of the season, I’d probably have forgotten him again. Graham panned Riggi's portrayal of Scott, stating "[He] seems to only do two moods, bland and irate bland." Graham praised the return of Georgina but felt that the character of Scott was bringing down Georgina. "It’s a pity we lose her flair along with his sour puss, but since she’s got a regular spot over on the new medical drama on NBC (“Mercy“) we’re lucky to have her at all." Graham considered the storyline for Chuck and Blair fighting over an auctioned photo "forced" but found the cause of both characters wanting to claim it to be interesting. Graham also praised Blair's self-conviction. "[...] it’s understandable for Blair to automatically assume that she’s been selected for a secret society, as she believes it to be her right."

On reviewing the episode, Graham considered it "mid-season-esque" and was disappointed that the show did not improve on the previous episode. "It looks like Gossip Girl, while not exactly setting the world on fire, continues to give us just enough to keep us interested. Oh, and then there’s the cryptic exchange between Bree and Carter, maybe that character will actually gain a dimension."

"The Lost Boy" was watched by 2.33 million of viewers, which is an increase from the previous episode, which was watched by 1.96 million of viewers. However, the episode have a 47% increase in million of viewers in the Live + 7 DVR Ratings, bringing the total of viewers up to 3.0 million of viewers.
