= Reunion (American TV series) =

American drama television series

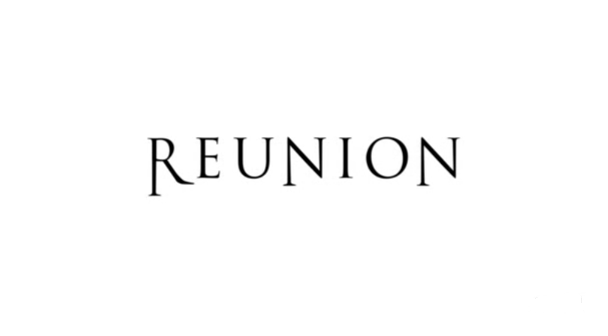
- Intertitle
- Genre: Drama
- Created by: Jon Harmon Feldman; Sara Goodman
- Starring: Will Estes; Chyler Leigh; Amanda Righetti; Dave Annable; Sean Faris; Alexa Davalos; Mathew St. Patrick
- Composer: John Frizzell
- Country of origin: United States
- Original language: English
- No. of seasons: 1
- No. of episodes: 13 (4 unaired)

Production
- Running time: 60 minutes
- Production companies: Class IV Productions; Oh That Gus!, Inc. Warner Bros. Television

Original release
- Network: Fox
- Release: September 8 – December 15, 2005

Reunion is an American drama television series that aired on Fox in late 2005. The series was intended to chronicle 20 years in the lives of a group of six high school friends from Bedford, New York, with each episode following one year in the lives of the six, beginning with their high school graduation year 1986. Each episode also featured scenes in the present where Detective Marjorino (Mathew St. Patrick) is investigating the brutal murder of one of the group during the night of their 20-year class reunion in 2006. The identity of the murder victim was not revealed until the fifth episode, "1990".

Due to low ratings, the series was canceled after only nine episodes (four more episodes had been ordered but were not aired in the US), and the identity of the killer remained unrevealed in the aired episodes.

== Cast and characters ==
=== Main ===
- Dave Annable as Aaron Lewis, slight geek who left MIT to sell technology and start an Internet company in its early days that blossomed into a multimillion-dollar company. His marriage to Pascal is compromised by his obvious lifelong affection for Carla.
- Alexa Davalos as Dr. Samantha Carlton, Craig's high school sweetheart and wife.
- Sean Faris as Craig Brewster, spoiled son of real estate mogul Russell Brewster and future politician.
- Will Estes as Will Malloy, Craig's best friend, Sam's secret admirer, and the father of Sam's secret daughter Amy. In early episodes, we learn that Will is a priest in the present time. After taking the rap for Craig for a DUI in 1986, Will goes to prison for manslaughter and was released in 1987 for good behavior, then worked for Craig's father in real estate before helping the FBI bring him down in 1989, later enlisting in the Army in 1990, shipping out to Kuwait as a part of the first Gulf War. After being discharged, he enrolls in law school.
- Chyler Leigh as Carla Noll, Aaron's best friend and hidden secret admirer for years, who entered into an abusive relationship with Amy's adopted father as Amy's nanny, and an aspiring photographer.
- Amanda Righetti as Jenna Moretti, the "hot girl" who enjoyed 15 minutes of fame in the late 1980s/early 1990s as an actress in Los Angeles before moving back to New York and attempting to get her life back on track.
- Mathew St. Patrick as Detective Kenneth Marjorino, who is investigating the brutal murder of one of the group during the night of their 20-year class reunion. Although his motives are initially secret, viewers quickly learn that Marjorino has harbored a 20-year grudge against Will Malloy, Craig Brewster, and their friends for what he perceives to be unfulfilled justice for the death of his father in a car crash that also involved a car occupied by Will and Craig.

=== Recurring ===
- Gregory Harrison as Russell Brewster, Craig's father who harbors hatred towards Will for betraying him and sending him to prison
- Gina Holden as Rachel Scofield, Craig's secretary and mistress
- Camille Sullivan as Meghan Phillips, adoptive mother of Samantha's daughter
- George Newbern as Paul Phillips, Meghan's husband and Carla's lover with abusive tendencies
- Wendy Glenn as Pascale, Aaron's French lover from Prague and a mother of their daughter

== Cancellation ==
Originally, Reunion was intended to last for 22 episodes, with each episode chronicling one year in the life of the six main characters—from their graduation in 1986 to the murder of one of them the day of their high school reunion in 2006. However, after a promising start, the show's ratings dropped, failing to hold the viewers from its lead in, The O.C., whereupon Fox announced the series would not be continued beyond the thirteen episodes already ordered.

While it was speculated the cancellation might lead to a change of the format—possibly skipping or combining some years to reach 2006 and reveal the murderer by the now-final thirteenth episode—series creator Jon Harmon Feldman originally announced the show would simply end with 1998, with the identity of the murderer unrevealed. However, after ratings continued to fall in December 2005, Fox announced – both in the media and on their official website – that the "1994" episode eventually would be the last, and the remaining four episodes filmed would not air. Fox later gave away outlines the episodes "1995", "1996", "1997" and "1998" to websites. On June 7, 2006, the episode "1998" was shown in many countries, but not the USA.

During the Television Critics Association press tour, Fox Entertainment president Peter Ligouri addressed reporters regarding the show's abrupt end. Ligouri stated there were several ways to go with the killer's identity. However, "the best guess was that particular time that it was going to be Sam's daughter", whom she gave up for adoption early in the series. The reason why the murder occurred still remains a mystery.

When Brazilian channel SBT aired episode 13, it featured an added ending in which a voice-over explained that the killer was Craig Brewster's father Russell (Gregory Harrison), angry over Samantha's previous affair with Will.

=== Unreleased plot ===
Sam was the one who ended up dying, so everybody was trying to cover their tracks. [The shooter] was supposed to be her daughter, who later down the road would have come to work for Carla. She [Carla] tries to get them reconciled, but someone breaks into the apartment of Craig Brewster, while Sam was there with her daughter. In a struggle with this intruder, Amy accidentally shot Sam.

When the 13th episode aired on the SBT channel in Brazil, additional information had been added. A narrator explained that an adult Amy, angry over being abandoned as an infant and being abused by her adopted father, accidentally shoots and kills Samantha. Will and Craig call Craig's high-powered dad, Russell (Gregory Harrison), for help. The big twist is that, when Russell arrives, he discovers that Samantha is still breathing and secretly suffocates her because of Sam's earlier affair with Will. His crime is eventually discovered and he's brought to justice. Dave Annable verified the events of this ending in October 2006.

== Episodes ==
No.	Title	Directed by	Written by	Original release date	Prod. code	U.S. viewers (millions)
1	"1986"	Jon Amiel	Teleplay by : Jon Harmon Feldman; Story by : Jon Harmon Feldman & Sara Goodman	September 8, 2005	475282	6.63
In the pilot, we are introduced to six friends in 1986, while one is being interviewed by the police in 2006. Carla is in love with Aaron, Aaron is in love with Jenna and Jenna is in love with everyone but Aaron. Meanwhile, Craig and Will are best friends, and after Will takes the rap for Craig's drunk driving incident, we discover Craig's girlfriend, Sam, is pregnant with Will's baby. She's about to go to London, Craig's about to go to Brown and Will's about to go to Jail. Fast forward to 2006--one of the group has been murdered, and the rest of them are all suspects.
2	"1987"	Michael Katleman	Jon Harmon Feldman	September 22, 2005	2T6851	5.19
Carla and Samantha are still in London. Samantha goes in labor. Will has been released from prison, and needs to cope with what others think of him. In the present, Carla is still telling her story to Detective Marjorino. The detective gets more evidence to tie in the recent murder to events that happened a few years ago.
3	"1988"	Rick Rosenthal	Gina Fattore	September 29, 2005	2T6852	4.55
The competition between Craig and Will for Samantha grows, causing Will--who now works for Craig's father--to cross some ethical and legal lines. Samantha has finally tracked down her daughter in New York. After the adoptive parents warn her to stay away, she and Carla hatch a plan to keep tabs on the child. The appearance of Jenna's mother threatens to overshadow her movie premiere, and Aaron tries to mend his broken heart in Seattle. Detective Marjorino's interest in the murder investigation is revealed to be more than just professional. This episode includes airing of Alan Replica's song 'We're on Automatic' at Jenna's birthday party.
4	"1989"	James Frawley	Mark Goffman	November 3, 2005	2T6853	3.57
A wedding brings out old rivalries as Samantha must finally choose between Craig and Will. At the same time, Will pays the ultimate price for the one crime he did commit, after he brings down the family of a close friend. Aaron returns from Seattle with a secret, and Jenna puts her own career ahead of Carla's. Detective Marjorino learns he's carried a grudge against the wrong man for 20 years, and one of our friends receives an anonymous letter--from someone who claims to know who the murderer is.
5	"1990"	Lou Antonio	Jennifer Johnson	November 10, 2005	2T6854	4.02
In the present, Marjorino is happy because he found someone important in his case and will get a statement. If the previous episodes didn't give us enough info about who died, this one will. In 1990, Jenna is shooting a movie in Los Angeles but is forced to come back home to Bedford when she learns her mother is dying of AIDS-related pneumonia. Craig has a meeting with his father's accountant about the company. Craig wants to keep his father's company afloat but things are not going to be easy. Carla is afraid that the secret of her becoming Amy's nanny so Sam could see her will soon be discovered. Aaron meets a beautiful French woman named Pascale while on a Prague train heading for Brussels. Will is in the Army to be shipped out to Kuwait in the Gulf War.
6	"1991"	Rick Rosenthal	Jesse Stern	November 17, 2005	2T6855	3.88
Present: Two teenagers, who are having a few beers by the East River, discover something that was thrown in the water (remember what it is?). Marjorino has a chat with one of the six friends. Past (1991): Will, back from Kuwait, visits Jenna at her new house by the beach. He has to do a favor for a friend from his unit. Craig and Aaron work together and have a secretary named Rachel. While Craig is not there, a man named Lloyd drops by their office and has an offer for Aaron. Carla is still Amy's nanny. It's Amy's first day in school. Carla has Paul come with her to pick up Amy at the end of the day but the child is nowhere to be found.
7	"1992"	Michael Katleman	Bruce Zimmerman	December 1, 2005	2T6856	4.07
Things get testy when the six friends gather together to celebrate Thanksgiving 1992. Aaron brings as his date, his co-worker Rachel, whom he doesn't realize has a motive for wanting to come: Craig. Jenna brings her movie-star husband and it quickly becomes apparent that the marriage is a sham. Sam thinks something is going on between Rachel and Craig and she wonders if she picked the right guy. Will brings his girlfriend Vanessa, his former Army buddy's sister, but is still carrying a torch for Samantha, while Russell Brewster shows up and demands that Will be thrown out, still blaming him for the collapse of the Brewster Group. Meanwhile, in the present day, Detective Marjorino's 20-year obsession for revenge against his father's killer and now the investigation of Samantha's murder is taking a toll on his marriage.
8	"1993"	Michael Lange	Teleplay by : Edgar Lyall; Story by : Scott Shepherd	December 8, 2005	2T6857	3.79
Present: Craig and Will visit Sam's grave. They are joined by a young man who claims that Sam deserved to die. Eventually, all the other friends arrive to visit Sam's grave. Past (1993): It's Samantha's birthday, and she is now a medical resident. She has a rough day where a patient of hers dies. We later find out that she is the mother of the young man at the grave in the present. Craig wants to become a state assemblyman. At Bedford High School, Jenna meets the students to tell them about her career. Also, Aaron learns that Pascal got pregnant from their one night stand 3 years ago, and he is now a father to Chloe.
9	"1994"	Milan Cheylov	Gina Fattore	December 15, 2005	2T6858	3.54
Present: Rachel is questioned & is a possible suspect for Sam's murder. Past (1994): A hopeful Carla gets her romantic hopes crushed by Aaron and another man named Peter. Aaron's Pascale is pregnant again and Craig's old cheatee wants to ruin his name. Craig and Sam are interviewed by a reporter named Elise concerning Craig's political life and the campaign. Of course, the reporter dug some dirt about them and throws it in their face to see their reactions. Sam is outraged by the reporter when she finds out Craig might have cheated on her again. The other friends will help the couple do some damage control. Later in the episode, the friends and their loved ones celebrate Christmas. Jenna's latest flame is named Brad. Will, Sam, and Pascale also appear. Will still likes Sam.
10	"1995"	Elodie Keene	Jennifer Johnson	Unaired	2T6859	N/A
Present: Something happens to Marjorino in a dark alley that will send him straight to the hospital. Will was on the scene and accompanies the detective in the ambulance. Past (1995): Sam and Craig set Will up for a blind date with Katherine Clark. The four of them have supper at Sam and Craig's loft. Will and Katherine seem to hit it off. But Will's smile will soon vanish when he learns more about Katherine's family. Carla gets a proposition she can't refuse. Aaron and his wife go to couple's therapy. Jenna learns one of her boyfriend's secrets.
11	"1996"	Jesús Salvador Treviño	Mark Goffman & Jesse Stern	Unaired	2T6860	N/A
Present: Craig's mother recently died and we learn Henry is responsible for the Marjorino accident. Past: In 1996. Katherine and Will are ready to take their relationship to another level. Will meets with Katherine's father. The three of them go hunting together, which results in a fight between Will and the Congressman. Then something horrible happens and Katherine's father is killed. Carla and Jenna are at Sam's house where they talk about Katherine and Will among other things. Carla and Peter are trying to have a child, after their recent elopement. However, while working at the hospital, Sam receives some test results for Peter, which seem to say he has leukemia. Single father Aaron has to take care of 13-month-old Noelle and five-year-old Chloe and also cope with work. After a hectic day and many problems, he calls on one of his best friends to help him out: Jenna.
12	"1997"	Rick Rosenthal	Teleplay by : Jon Harmon Feldman & Jennifer Johnson; Story by : Jon Harmon Feldman	Unaired	2T6861	N/A
After Pascale left Aaron, it seems Jenna moved in to help take care of Chloe and Noelle. When Pascale comes back and wants custody, a court battle ensues. Through the trial, we become aware that while Jenna was living with Aaron, their relationship was not totally platonic. Meanwhile, Carla is at the hospital with Peter, who is sick with leukemia. The doctor informs them that the chemo is not working as well as they had hoped, but in some cases, a bone marrow treatment can be quite effective. Carla meets with a medical claims officer who explains bone marrow treatment is not effective. However, he insinuates that if Carla were to sleep with him, he could find a way to get her the money. Carla is thoroughly disgusted and calls Aaron to ask for money. Aaron says his assets have been frozen due to Pascale's suit. Carla finally decides giving the claims officer what he wants may be the only way to save her husband. Contemplating what she is about to do, Carla receives a call from Aaron saying his assets are unfrozen and he has money they can borrow. Finally, Will learns the truth about Amy.
13	"1998"	Elodie Keene	Bruce Zimmerman	Unaired	2T6862	N/A
It is 1998 and Craig is turning 30. Aaron decides to throw him a party that will lead to unfortunate endings for both of them. Jenna finally gets a significant working proposal, but it's in New Zealand. Sam tries to fix things up with Will as they join forces to search for Amy in Maine. Carla encounters someone from the past.
