= The Hurt Locket =

- Gossip Girl episode
- Chuck finally meets his biological mother.
- Episode no.: Season 3 Episode 13
- Directed by: Tony Wharmby
- Written by: Sara Goodman
- Production code: 313
- Original air date: March 8, 2010

Guest appearances
- Laura Harring as Elizabeth Fisher; Sherri Saum as Holland Kemble; Kevin Zegers as Damian Daalgard

Episode chronology
← Previous "The Debarted"	Next → "The Lady Vanished"
- Gossip Girl season 3

"The Hurt Locket" is the 56th episode of The CW television series, Gossip Girl. It is also the thirteenth episode of the show's third season. The episode was written by Sara Goodman and directed by Tony Wharmby. It originally aired on Monday, March 8, 2010, on the CW.

Reviews for this episode were mixed, with the critics feeling that the episode was a bit low compared to the previous one. Despite that, Leighton Meester's performance as Blair Waldorf was critically acclaimed.

== Plot ==
Serena and Blair converse over the phone regarding Serena's growing relationship with Nate. Then, Serena runs into Damien Daalgard (Kevin Zegers), a schoolmate from boarding school. Due to pressure from Dan, Nate uninvites Serena from the French ambassador's state dinner because he wants to take things slow. Then, Serena asks Damien to be her date to the dinner in order to make Nate jealous. Chuck lies to Blair when she discovers the mysterious locket with the letter E. He ditches her in order to hunt down the woman at his father's grave. Blair becomes upset because Chuck was supposed to introduce her to the founder of a secret French society. Chuck tracks down the jeweler who made the locket, and he discovers that Elizabeth Fisher (Laura Harring) was its owner.

Then, Damien arrives to see Jenny for their next drug deal, but Lily thinks that Damien is Jenny's boyfriend. Jenny reassures Lily that Damien is strictly a friend. They plot together to make a coat containing pills in the buttons. The coat will ultimately end up with their client, the French ambassador's daughter. Jenny is upset when Damien tells her that Serena will be wearing the jacket. She wants to protect Serena, and she also wanted to be Damien's date. Instead, she sneaks her way into the dinner as Nate's date, which infuriates Serena. In addition, Damien's plan is foiled because an unknowing Serena refuses to take the jacket off. Damien tries to seduce her, but she blows him off. She then finds Nate in the coat closet, where they have sex and the jacket is left on the floor. They both apologize for acting childishly, and they leave the dinner together.

When Chuck arrives at the dinner, he tells Blair that he thinks the woman with the locket is his mother. She accompanies him to find the woman instead of meeting the secret society founder. When they arrive at her hotel, the woman tells Chuck that she was just another one of his father's lovers. Blair sees through the lies, and she takes Elizabeth aside to tell her that Chuck has been in pain his entire life because he thinks that he killed his mother. She implores her to talk to Chuck if she can ease his pain in any way. Later, Elizabeth tries to call Chuck, but he doesn't answer his phone.

Rufus returns from a skiing trip, and he won't return Lily's calls. He confronts her regarding the letter stating that she stayed in a hotel with Serena's father when she was supposed to be taking care of her mother. Lily reveals that they only kissed, but Rufus is angered that she kept the kiss a secret for so long. He leaves her in order to clear his head, but he ends up in Holland's apartment. Then, Jenny saves the day at the dinner when she finds Serena's coat on the floor of the closet. She tells the coat check girl to give it to the ambassador's daughter. Grateful, Damien tries to flirt when Jenny, but she tells him that if he wants a date, he needs to ask. Far from the state dinner, Dan calls Vanessa after he learns of his father's marriage troubles. Vanessa has been avoiding him since Thanksgiving, and she won't return his calls.

== Reception ==
"The Hurt Locket" received mixed reviews with Leighton Meester's performances receiving critical acclaim. Isabelle Carreau of TV Squad praised Meester's performance, praising her decision to stand by Chuck and throwing away her chance to meet the French Ambassador. Enid Portuguez, from Los Angeles Times, cited Blair's maturity in the episode when she did not believe Elizabeth's lies. Portuguez further praised the episode, stating "when contrasted with the vulnerability that they show each other privately, we truly see why they're the show's most compelling relationship", referencing Chuck and Blair as the power-couple of the show. Jennifer Sankowski, from TV Guide, enjoyed the fact that the show's writers finally put Serena and Nate as couple by saying that "the two of them were adorably giddy" in the episode.

Also, L.J. Gibbs, from TV Fanatic, gave the episode a 3.5 out of 5 stars, and Jacob, from Television Without Pity, gave the episode a C rating.
