= No Ordinary Family =

American TV series (2010–2011)

- Genre: Comedy drama; Science fiction; Crime drama; Superhero
- Created by: Greg Berlanti; Jon Harmon Feldman
- Starring: Michael Chiklis; Julie Benz; Kay Panabaker; Jimmy Bennett; Autumn Reeser; Romany Malco; Stephen Collins; Josh Stewart
- Composer: Blake Neely
- Country of origin: United States
- Original language: English
- No. of seasons: 1
- No. of episodes: 20

Production
- Executive producers: Greg Berlanti; Jon Harmon Feldman; Morgan Wandell; David Semel
- Running time: 44 minutes
- Production companies: Berlanti Television; Oh That Gus!, Inc.; ABC Studios

Original release
- Network: ABC (United States); CTV (Canada)
- Release: September 28, 2010 – April 5, 2011

No Ordinary Family is an American television series that aired on ABC in the United States and CTV in Canada. The one hour science fiction comedy drama was produced by ABC Studios for the 2010–2011 television season. The series ran from September 28, 2010, to April 5, 2011, on Tuesdays at 8:00pm ET/PT. The show centers on the Powells, a typical American family living in fictional Pacific Bay, California, whose members gain special powers after their plane crashes in Brazil's Amazon rainforest.

On May 13, 2011, ABC canceled the series after one season. The decision followed declining ratings throughout its run, with the network having previously reduced the episode order from 22 to 20 in February 2011.

== Cast and characters ==
=== Main cast ===
- Michael Chiklis as James "Jim" Powell, Sr. – a police sketch artist whose power is super-strength (he can lift 11,000 lbs). He is nearly invulnerable, and can leap over tall buildings (or jump a quarter-mile). When in contact with cinoxate, his powers fail. His weakness lies in finesse and agility.
- Julie Benz as Dr. Stephanie Powell (née Crane) – a scientist who works at Global Tech. She has super speed (running 10 miles in just under five seconds) and an incredibly fast metabolism that allows her to heal quickly. When she was attacked by Lucas Winnick, an animal-like posthuman, she was injected with the Trilsetum coronis serum in an attempt to save her life. This allowed her to (possibly only temporarily) run faster than the speed of light, enabling time travel. She was initially working on the research of the Trilsetum coronis, the "crown jewel" plant of the Amazon Basin. She later found out that the plant shared the same chromosomes as the family's superpowered DNA.
- Kay Panabaker as Daphne Nicole Powell – Jim and Stephanie's 16-year-old daughter. She has the power of telepathy and the ability to view the memories of others. She later discovered that she could also influence the behavior of others for a short time by means of telepathic suggestion (the term "pushing" was also used to describe this ability, possibly in reference to a similar ability possessed by the Andy McGee character in Firestarter by Stephen King). She also develops the ability to erase memories through this method.
- Jimmy Bennett as James "JJ" Powell, Jr. – Jim and Stephanie's 14-year-old son; a teenager with enhanced intelligence. He has the ability to speed-read and comprehend large amounts of information by just reading the page (initially only capable of remembering it for six hours). This ability gives him a photographic memory. He is also capable of learning a new language fluently in a matter of minutes. His powers extend to a form of "genius vision". When he experiences intense emotional stress, his powers fail. His enhanced intellect appears to extend his ability to handle extra-academic situations, enhanced fighting skill being an example. It is revealed that he is immune to Daphne's telepathic push.
- Autumn Reeser as Katie Andrews – a lab tech and Stephanie's personal assistant at Global Tech and comic book fangirl. She is aware of the Powells' superpowers. She is also dating the Watcher (under the alias of Will and later Joshua), but it is unknown to her that he had been hired by Dr. King to find out about the Powell family's abilities. Her favorite superhero(ine) is Kitty Pryde. Katie acquired telekinetic powers due to her pregnancy with Joshua's child. Katie and Joshua eventually reconnect after he returns and helps Katie deliver their baby prematurely. The baby initially appears to be stillborn, but its eyes quickly flash green and it returns to life, presumably as a result of its Trilsetum coronis DNA.
- Romany Malco as George St. Cloud – an assistant district attorney in Pacific Bay and long-time friend of Jim's. He also knows of the Powells' superpowers. He is a comic book fanboy. He sponsors and runs the crime-fighting intelligence network ("The Lair") from his garage which he has equipped with hi-tech surveillance, tracking and computer equipment. In the season one finale, George is aboard an airplane along with 80 prisoners who are to be turned into super villains. Since George survived the crash it is presumed that he also developed super powers like the rest of passengers on the plane after crashing in the same manner as the Powells.
- Stephen Collins as Dr. Dayton King – Stephanie's boss at Global Tech and, as the series unfolds, a key figure in the Powells' super-powered universe. He is a typical Hitchcockian villain to the series (i.e. a character who clearly cannot be trusted). He is also in love with Stephanie Powell. In episode 14, through the security cameras, he finally learns of Jim and Stephanie's powers. In episode 16, it is revealed that he is The Watcher's adoptive father and has some sort of interest in JJ's powers. It is revealed he took the serum to heal himself after contracting cancer. In episode 20, JJ injects him with Stephanie's power cure, and King dies when the cancer returns at an accelerated rate.
- Josh Stewart as the Watcher – Dr. King's super villain enforcer and assassin, his control of people's memory allows him to return under different aliases, Will and later Joshua, when interacting with the family during his investigation of them. His powers are temporary, and without regular injections from Dr. King to maintain them, he undergoes withdrawal. He has been shown to have the abilities of telekinesis, telepathic suggestion, and an immunity to Daphne's telepathy. In Episode 11, he surrenders the injections that give him his powers in order to start a normal relationship with Katie. In Episode 16, he learns that Dr. King is his adoptive father who saved his life from a terminal illness by injecting him with the serum when Joshua was 6 years old. In the season finale, Joshua helps JJ figure out the secret to making the super powers permanent, after which Dr. King tells his "son" that Joshua should go and be with his family. Joshua returns to Katie, and, after turning Victoria away, helps Katie deliver their child.

=== Recurring cast ===
- Christina Chang as Detective Yvonne Cho – a cop who worked at the same precinct as Jim. She was murdered by Joshua (The Watcher) in Episode 2, shot with her own gun, off screen.
- Jason Antoon as Mr. Litchfield – JJ's math teacher, who initially suspected JJ of cheating due to his sharp change after he came back from his vacation. Later worked for Dr. King and then Mrs. X in attempting to harness JJ's powers for himself. Killed on Mrs. X's orders after repeatedly failing to get JJ's cooperation.
- Guillermo Díaz as Detective Frank Cordero. Took over Detective Cho's role after her murder. Was killed by dirty cops in Episode 19.
- Reggie Lee as Dr. Francis Chiles – a scientist who worked for Global Tech. He was murdered by the Watcher in Episode 10.
- Amy Acker as Amanda Grayson, co-counsel of George and DA of the Pacific Bay district. She seems to have a close relationship with George.
- Luke Kleintank as Chris Minor – a juvenile delinquent with a good heart, who falls for Daphne Powell and becomes her new boyfriend. She eventually tells him about her powers. He persuades her to use them to help them cut school and get time off from his boss. When her family pressures her to keep their secret, Daphne decides to erase Chris's memory of her powers. However, this also makes him forget their entire relationship.
- Jonna Walsh as Megan—Daphne's friend, who she wishes to confide her secret to.
- Katelyn Tarver as Natalie Poston – JJ's love interest, member of the "Smart People Club", good at playing chess. Her mother was murdered when she was four years old and she never knew who her father was, so she has moved around between foster homes for the past 12 years.
- Katrina Begin as Bailey Browning – alpha girl at Daphne's and JJ's high school. She has shown to take an interest in JJ after JJ's and Natalie's break-up.
- Rebecca Mader as Victoria Morrow – Vice President of Human Resource at Global Tech and another super villain. She pledged allegiance to Dr. King and has the ability to shape-shift. In Episode 13, she learned of Stephanie Powell's superpowers. In Episode 15, she appears to die in a brawl with Jim. However, it turns out later she is still alive, revived by Mrs. X, who sends her to find out more of Katie's pregnancy. In Episode 20, it is revealed that she is also in love with Joshua. She is also on the plane that spirals out of control and crashes in that same episode.
- Jean-Luc Bilodeau as Brett Martin – Daphne's schoolmate who is interested in modern art, Japanese language and sushi.
- Lucy Lawless as Helen Burton, a.k.a. Mrs. X – The CEO of Global Tech whom Dr. King works for and reports to. She is the real villain to the series and is intent on finding out the Powells' powers and the secret to permanence.

=== Guest cast ===
- Tate Donovan as Mitch McCutcheon – was initially a series regular, but was subsequently dropped. The pilot for the Powell's airplane for their Brazil trip who is presumed dead.
- Chord Overstreet as Lucas Fisher – Daphne's boyfriend (in the unaired pilot, replaced by Nathan Keyes) who she discovers is cheating on her when she reads his mind.
- Bruce McGill as Allan Crane – Stephanie's father who hates Jim and later accuses him of cheating on Stephanie.
- Cybill Shepherd as Barbara Crane – Stephanie's mother
- Jackson Rathbone as Trent – a boy who witnesses his house being robbed, refuses to tell the truth to the police. Daphne discovers new elements to her powers when she touches his hand and can read his past thoughts/memories re: the break-in.
- Rachel Miner as Rebecca Jessup – formerly arrested, she used her hands to emit shock-waves to create artificial earthquakes in order to steal medicines in various pharmacies to get rid of her abilities. She was also locked up by Dr. King many times. It is not known what happened to her after she has been knocked out by Joshua (Watcher).
- Anthony Michael Hall as Roy Minor – Chris's father who gains super strength making him stronger than Jim after his son steals Stephanie's serum.
- Alex Solowitz as Theo Patton – a sociopathic serial arsonist who can set himself on fire; supposedly killed when a tank of sand fell on him while he was on fire.
- Jamie Harris as Reed Koblenz – a teleporter and robber who was shot and killed by Det. Cho in episode 1.
- Annie Wersching as Michelle Cotten – Dave's wife and secret art thief.
- Rick Schroder as Dave Cotten – a man who befriends the Powells after Jim saves his life.
- Billy Unger as Troy Cotten – Dave and Michelle's son.
- Conor Leslie as Chloe Cotten – Dave and Michelle's daughter.
- Jason Wiles as Mike Powell – Jim's brother who is up to his neck in debt and takes advantage of JJ's powers.
- Ethan Suplee as Tom Seeley – escaped from Santos County Correctional Facility the same place where Rebeccas Jessup and Theo Patton was arrested. He wanted payback on Dr. King. Can become fog with his powers.
- Tricia Helfer as Sophie Adler – a beautiful woman who can make men fall in love with her by way of her pheromones. Mrs. X asks her to seduce George and Jim; the plan works at first, but ultimately fails. She dies in a car explosion which was set up by Mrs. X.
- Robert Picardo as Mr. Lance – The vice-principal at Daphne and JJ's school.
- Eric Balfour as Lucas Winnick – a man with the powers of various animals who Mrs. X assigns to kill people with super powers but he later discovers that the Powells have powers and they become his next target.
- Michael Maize as Ben – a man with the power to use electricity to stop or kill people. He dies in episode 20 when his abilities backfire on him.
- Shay Carl as security guard

== Development and casting ==
On January 25, 2010, ABC green-lit production of the pilot, which was written by Greg Berlanti and Jon Harmon Feldman. David Semel directed the pilot. Berlanti and Feldman are executive producers, along with Morgan Wandell.

In early February 2010, Michael Chiklis became the first actor to join the series, playing family patriarch Jim Powell. Autumn Reeser was the next actor cast, to play a colleague of Jim's wife. Romany Malco portrays Jim's best friend and college roommate.

March 2010 casting included Julie Benz as Jim's wife and family matriarch Stephanie Powell and Christina Chang as a police officer who works with Jim. Tate Donovan is the mysterious pilot of the plane that crashes. Rounding out the cast are Kay Panabaker and Jimmy Bennett, who portray the Powell children Daphne and JJ.

On May 12, 2010, Entertainment Weekly reported that ABC had picked up the series for the 2010–11 television season. A few days later, Chuck writer and executive producer Allison Adler (credited as Ali Adler) announced that she would be joining the show's writing team. At the end of May, Smallville writers Darren Swimmer and Todd Slavkin joined the writing team.

On June 3, 2010, Donovan and Chang left the show due to the completion of their story lines. Producers said there was a potential for Donovan to come back as guest stars at a later date. Stephen Collins, who initially had a small role in the series, was promoted to a series regular in mid-June. Entertainment Weekly's Michael Ausiello reports that Josh Stewart, late of Criminal Minds, has joined the cast as the Watcher.

On October 25, 2010, ABC gave the series a full-season order. This order was cut back to 20 episodes on February 26, 2011.

At the beginning of March 2011, the two lead stars Michael Chiklis and Julie Benz signed for Fall 2011 CBS pilot offers. Also, around the same time, there were reports that Disney was temporarily moving the series' sets from their lot.

== Episodes ==
With the exception of "Pilot", all episodes start with the phrase "No Ordinary".

No.	Title	Directed by	Written by	Original release date	US viewers (millions)
1	"Pilot"	David Semel	Story by : Greg Berlanti & Jon Harmon Feldman; Teleplay by : Jon Harmon Feldman	September 28, 2010	10.69
The Powells are an average ordinary family that is falling apart due to Jim's inability to bond with his wife, Stephanie whose career as a research professional is flourishing as well as his kids, Daphne and J.J. as they succumb to their teenage problems. However, superpower changes occur after a plane crash during a family trip in Brazil which grants Jim super strength and invulnerability which he uses to stop crime in the city with the help of his friend and defense attorney, George. Stephanie is given super speed and shares this secret with her assistant, Katie while the two work on a newly approved research on a mysterious plant. Daphne has problems dealing with her telepathy when she is distracted by everyone's thoughts. J.J, who is initially perceived as unaffected develops a super-brain which allows him to deduce and learn things instantly.
2	"No Ordinary Marriage"	David Semel	Ali Adler & Jon Harmon Feldman	October 5, 2010	8.99
JJ is accused of cheating, but won't tell his family about his power. Stephanie finds a sample of the Amazon water and discovers it is just regular water, wondering how she and the family got the superpowers. Jim stops a bank robbery, but Det. Yvonne Cho sees him running from the scene and later confronts him, and Jim tells her about his powers. Yvonne tells him that if he shows up at another crime scene he will be arrested. Daphne learns to control her powers by focusing on her thoughts only. Finally, a criminal with superpowers arrives in Yvonne's apartment, shooting her with her own gun via telekinesis.
3	"No Ordinary Ring"	Terry McDonough	Zack Estrin & Marc Guggenheim	October 12, 2010	7.72
After the family witnesses a robbery at a friend's wedding, Jim and George crash numerous weddings to find the culprits who stole Stephanie's engagement ring. Stephanie is worried about giving a sample of her blood to the company lab as a part of mandatory work physical. JJ asks Daphne to read the mind of girl he likes to see if she has mutual feelings. Daphne is desperate to tell a childhood friend about her abilities.
4	"No Ordinary Vigilante"	Ron Underwood	Ali Adler & Jon Harmon Feldman	October 19, 2010	7.41
A man whose son was murdered years ago, is out to deliver his own justice by shooting purse snatchers at a city park. Jim is then seen at the crime scene and is mistaken for the vigilante. Dr. Francis Chiles (Reggie Lee) becomes suspicious of Stephanie and Katie's behavior at the lab. JJ's mathematical abilities begin to increase and he uses them to join the football team. Daphne uses her abilities to find out where a party is being held.
5	"No Ordinary Quake"	Timothy Busfield	Todd Slavkin & Darren Swimmer	October 26, 2010	7.38
A number of earthquakes are happening at pharmacies with the conclusion that they are man-made. Jim and George learn that they are created by a woman (Rachel Miner) who has the ability to create shockwaves with her hands and that she is robbing the pharmacies for medication to get rid of her condition. Stephanie is fully convinced that JJ is hiding his abilities from her and Jim, so she tries to have him tested. Daphne reads the minds of a teacher and a student, believing that they are having an affair.
6	"No Ordinary Visitors"	David Paymer	Ali Adler & Zack Estrin	November 9, 2010	7.89
A series of home invasions breaks out at the same time as Stephanie's parents (Cybill Shepherd and Bruce McGill) unexpectedly visit. Stephanie declares no powers during their visit, but the overbearing in-laws quickly test Jim and JJ's self-restraint. Meanwhile, Trent (Jackson Rathbone) a boy who witnesses his house being robbed, refuses to tell the truth to the police. Daphne assists Jim in the investigation and discovers that she can see people's memories by touching them, which she does by touching Trent. In the end grandpa loses his car to JJ which is loaned to Daphne for two years just till JJ gets his license.
7	"No Ordinary Mobster"	John Polson	Marc Guggenheim	November 16, 2010	6.69
Jim goes after a recently acquitted mobster who was behind the shooting of George's assistant district attorney (Amy Acker). In the process, the mobster pulls off Jim's mask seeing his face with Jim now fearing his life is at jeopardy. Stephanie is confronted by Dr. King and has asked her to stop prying in a late doctor's old research. Daphne asks JJ to use his abilities to help her impress a boy, Brett Martin (Jean-Luc Bilodeau) who is interested in modern art. Stephanie asks Katie to tutor JJ, he then learns that Katie isn't very good with meeting men, instead chatting with them online. So he creates a false persona to chat with her.
8	"No Ordinary Accident"	Tom Verica	Leigh Dana Jackson & Sonny Postiglione	November 23, 2010	7.00
Jim's enemy, a group of carjackers, crash into Mr. Litchfield, JJ's math teacher, and pierces Litchfield's aorta, prompting Stephanie and JJ to operate on him. Meanwhile, Jim starts to lose his powers, and Daphne tries to impress Brett by lying about her speaking Japanese.
9	"No Ordinary Anniversary"	David Semel	Kate Barnow & Elisabeth R. Finch	November 30, 2010	6.23
Jim and Stephanie plan a romantic evening for their anniversary, but a serial arsonist has them distracted. Daphne and JJ join forces to win some big money in a poker game with some fellow students.
10	"No Ordinary Sidekick"	Wendey Stanzler	Zack Estrin & Jon Harmon Feldman	December 7, 2010	6.35
George mistakenly receives credit for stopping a robbery that Jim actually stopped; Katie's new boyfriend Will isn't who he says he is. Jim and Stephanie lose their sidekicks after a fight with Katie and George about how they don't get enough credit for their "Team." Meanwhile, JJ discovers that a girl he likes (Katelyn Tarver) is shorting out his powers. Daphne meets Will and uncovers his identity forcing him to erase her memory of the last three months. Dr. Chiles is killed by Will after telling Stephanie about Dr. King's mutant serum.
11	"No Ordinary Friends"	Terry McDonough	Ali Adler & Marc Guggenheim	January 4, 2011	6.75
The family is able to retrieve Daphne's memory by using her powers to see other people's minds through touch. Dave Cotten (Rick Schroder) and his family befriend the Powells after Jim saves Dave from an accident. Dave's daughter Chloe (Conor Leslie) encourages Daphne to stand for school president against arrogant bully, Bailey Browning (Katrina Begin) and her son Troy (Billy Unger) helps J.J. with getting Bailey to fall in love with him. However, while Jim investigates a series of art thefts, he begins to suspect that Dave is the culprit. When Jim voices his suspicions, Dave's wife Michelle (Annie Wersching) admits to Stephanie that she stole the art to help her family. Michelle and her fence (Josh Feinman) are arrested after Michelle saves Stephanie from the fence. Meanwhile, Katie confesses her virginity to Joshua, driving him to confront the reality of their relationship and resign as Dr. King's super-powered pet.
12	"No Ordinary Brother"	Michael Watkins	Todd Slavkin & Darren Swimmer	January 11, 2011	5.33
Jim's brother, Mike (Jason Wiles) shows up much to Stephanie's dismay to start up a new business until Jim realises the only business he has come to stir up in Pacific Bay is trouble when he finds out that he owes a huge debt to a prominent loan shark. Stephanie deals with Katie leaving for Miami after she gets a promotion. Joshua decides to leave with Katie forcing Dr. King to employ a shapeshifter, Victoria Morrow (Rebecca Mader) to stop him from leaving at all costs. Daphne investigates a student, Chris after she accidentally gives him detention for an offence he didn't commit. Meanwhile, Mike asks for J.J's help to pay back his debts.
13	"No Ordinary Detention"	David Petrarca	Zack Estrin & Leigh Dana Jackson	January 18, 2011	5.71
Jim handles a complicated hostage situation at the precinct the Die Hard way when he finds out it involves a suspicious Internal Affairs agent, 4 hardened criminals and a captured George. Sparks fly along with secrets when Daphne and J.J. play truth and dare with their detention mates - Bailey, Chris and Natalie, Bailey dares Daphne to kiss Chris Minor and she does, she sees why Chris was arrested by using her powers. Daphne kisses Chris and they go out. Katie asks Stephanie to medically examine Joshua after he goes through a withdrawal phase of the serum but circumstances become dangerous when Victoria decides to crash the party looking like Katie, confusing Stephanie and Joshua.
14	"No Ordinary Double Standard"	Paul Edwards	Sallie Patrick	February 8, 2011	5.23
Jim and Stephanie race each other to see who is able to solve the attack on Stephanie's friend, Lina Perkins first along with their respective partners, George and Katie but are shocked when they find the answers involve human experiments conducted on criminals by Dr. King. J.J. goes out on a date with Bailey but backs off as soon as she learns he is still in love with Natalie. Daphne sneaks out for a date with Chris and learns a whole new side of her powers when she is confronted by a robber. Dr. King tells Katie the truth about Joshua driving her to confront him.
15	"No Ordinary Powell"	Terry McDonough	Ali Adler & Sonny Postiglione	February 15, 2011	5.03
Dr. King uses Victoria to infiltrate the Powell family and find out the reasons behind the permanence of their abilities but her plans are soon thwarted by Jim when he discovers her real identity and purpose. Stephanie finds out that Dr. King is the one who assigned Victoria to kill her husband and decides to do some infiltration of her by playing a larger role in his human experiments. J.J. and Daphne find trouble when they use their abilities together to solve the long forgotten murder of Natalie's mother.
16	"No Ordinary Proposal"	Stephen Surjik	Andrew Major & Emily Silver	February 22, 2011	4.77
Jim feels guilty when he unintentionally causes harm to a civilian during one of his crime fighting operations and to further complicate matters, starts suspecting Daphne's boyfriend Chris when a vial of super-serum vanishes from the house. Stephanie develops an antidote for Joshua but soon discovers the truth about him from none other than Dr. King. Katie is thrilled when Joshua proposes to her but his dark past rises again to destroy their relationship. J.J. is blackmailed by Mr. Litchfield to join the academic decathlon team in exchange for the provision of a merit scholarship to Natalie, unaware of the fact that Litchfield is secretly working for Dr. King.
17	"No Ordinary Love"	Peter Werner	Kate Barnow & Elisabeth R. Finch	March 1, 2011	4.26
Katie tries to distract herself to take her mind off Joshua. Jim and Stephanie's marriage is threatened when George's new lady friend, Sophie (Tricia Helfer) uses both Jim and George to destroy Global Tech using the power to make them fall in love with her. Dr. King manipulates Stephanie into conducting a serum operation on a cold blooded killer called Lucas Winnick who is later employed by the CEO of Global Tech, a villainous and mysterious woman who is set out to eliminate Dr. King's mistakes. Daphne inserts thoughts in Chris's mind to stop him from finding out the truth about her family but fails so she tells him.
18	"No Ordinary Animal"	Greg Beeman	Zack Estrin & Jon Harmon Feldman	March 22, 2011	5.35
Lucas Winnick (Eric Balfour) starts eliminating the supers using his "claws" and strikes a major blow against the Powells by injuring Stephanie forcing Jim to confront him. Mr. Litchfield forces J.J. to complete strange equations for Dr. King which are revealed to be related to power permanence. Chris manipulates Daphne into using her brainwashing powers to attend a Sara Bareilles concert, but their plans are halted when Lucas finds them. Katie realises that Lucas attacked her because she is pregnant with Joshua's baby, temporarily giving her telekinetic powers. Dr. King treats Stephanie but the treatment results in unpredictable side effects when Stephanie vanishes into a space time portal. American video blogger Shay Carl makes a guest appearance as a security guard.
19	"No Ordinary Future"	Milan Cheylov	Todd Slavkin & Darren Swimmer	March 26, 2011	3.52
After witnessing the downfall of her family upon running into space/time slit that took her into the future, Stephanie must do everything she can to alter a chain of events in the present that will expose the Powell's superpowers to the world. Meanwhile, with George's help, Jim tracks down those responsible for the death of a fellow cop; and Helen Burton/Mrs. X (Lucy Lawless) tasks Victoria (after resurrecting her) to keep tabs on Katie and her superhuman unborn baby and asks her to eliminate Katie once the baby is delivered. Daphne stops a corrupt cop from shooting George, using her mind control, and this is witnessed by Jim. Due to this, both of Daphne's parents find out about her power of telepathic suggestion, and they make her erase Chris's memories of their powers. However, when she does this, she inadvertently causes him to forget about the entirety of their relationship together, Daphne is very upset and J.J comforts her. J.J., thanks to Daphne's mind reading finds out that Mr. Litchfield is using him to deliver the mysterious biochemical equations to someone.
20	"No Ordinary Beginning"	Paul Edwards	Story by : Jon Harmon Feldman; Teleplay by : Ali Adler & Zack Estrin	April 5, 2011	5.74
JJ is kidnapped by Mrs. X and forced to solve an enigma that could lead to the permanence of the trillsettum's effects. The other Powells are captured while trying to save him from a secret GlobalTech facility and the Powell family must fight for its freedom. Meanwhile, Joshua and Katie become the parents of a baby boy. Once the Powells are safely back at home, they get a surprise visit from a NSA agent who says that the United States government needs their help because they are "no ordinary family."

== Reception ==
=== Ratings ===
The premiere was watched by 10.69 million viewers, the second episode dropped to 8.99 million viewers.

=== Critical reception ===
The series pilot episode received mostly positive reviews from critics. Review aggregator Metacritic gave the series a score of 65 out of 100, indicating generally favorable reviews based on 28 professional critics. Alessandra Stanley from The New York Times gave an average review, praising the fact that the show offers "calmer, more restrained fantasy about paranormal prowess" by combining shows like Heroes and Lost with the wholesome fantasy of Pixar's The Incredibles and Disney's The Swiss Family Robinson, but concluded her review by saying that "it's not clear whether this series—a hybrid of family drama and graphic novel—can sustain interest once the premise is fully established". Tim Goodman of the San Francisco Chronicle wrote a review saying that "There's lot of promise here, of drama, action, comedy, etc, all wrapped up in a family-friendly series." The Miami Herald's Glenn Garvin gave a positive review by saying that the show is "a perceptive and engaging comedy drama about domestic dysfunction", he also praised Benz and Chiklis saying that they are "splendid as a startled couple", with Panabaker "as their sulky, contemptuous daughter".

Praise about the main leads also came from The Boston Globe, with critic Matthew Gilbert saying that it's nice to see Chiklis and Benz in roles different from their previous television roles, and ends his review by saying that "With believable chemistry together, Chiklis and Benz help create a solid TV couple and, let's hope, no ordinary series". However, Verne Gay from Newsday criticized Chiklis's performance saying that it is a "spectacular...case of miscasting".

=== Awards ===
Ceremony	Category	Nominee(s)	Episode	Result
Hollywood Post Alliance	Outstanding Compositing - Television	Jason Fotter, Matt von Brock, Aldo Ruggiero, Eric Hayden, Fuse FX	"No Ordinary Double Standard"	Nominated
People's Choice Awards	Favorite New TV Drama			Nominated
Visual Effects Society	Outstanding Visual Effects in a Broadcast Series	Andrew Orloff, Curt Miller, Paul Linden, Scott Tinter		Nominated

== International broadcasts ==
The series premiered in the U.S. and Canada on September 28, 2010, and in Latin America on October 8, 2010 on SET. The show was one of the first US Fall 2010–2011 new series to premiere in South Africa and aired on M-Net Series from November 2010. It premiered in Italy on October 6, 2010, on Fox Italy, part of the Sky Italy Broadcast Group, and in the United Kingdom on January 11, 2011, on Watch, part of the UKTV group.

In New Zealand the series premiered on February 3, 2011 on TV2. The fifth episode, No Ordinary Quake, was not broadcast as it was due to be broadcast just after the 2011 Christchurch earthquake. It was only available via TVNZ's on-demand service.

In Greece the series premiered March 3, 2011 on FX (Greece). The series premiered in Hong Kong on March 24, 2011 on TVB Pearl at 10:35 pm every Thursday. In Russia the series premiered Apr 4, 2011 on Fox Life. On May 2, 2011 the series premiered in Australia on the Seven Network at 7:30 pm, and in India on Zee Cafe at 10:00 pm. In Slovakia the series premiered June 27, 2011 at 8:15 pm on TV JOJ.

In Malaysia, the series will be premiering starts July 10, 2025, every Thursday at 12:00 midnight on TV2 (Malaysian TV network) and in Singapore on February 7, 2026, every Saturday at 8:00 pm on Mediacorp Channel 5. And also premiered in 2010 on TV3 (Malaysian TV network) with the slot, Aksi.

== Home media ==
The show was released on DVD on September 9, 2011.
