= Big Shots (TV series) =

- Genre: Comedy drama; Farce
- Created by: Jon Harmon Feldman
- Starring: Michael Vartan; Dylan McDermott; Christopher Titus; Joshua Malina; Nia Long; Peyton List; Jessica Collins; Amy Sloan; Paige Turco
- Composer: Josh Kramon
- Country of origin: United States
- Original language: English
- No. of seasons: 1
- No. of episodes: 11

Production
- Executive producer: Jon Harmon Feldman
- Running time: 60 minutes
- Production companies: Oh That Gus!, Inc.; Warner Bros. Television

Original release
- Network: ABC
- Release: September 27, 2007 – January 24, 2008

Big Shots is an American comedy-drama television series created and executive produced by Jon Harmon Feldman and aired on ABC from September 27, 2007, to January 24, 2008. The pilot was directed by Charles McDougall.

== History ==
Produced by Warner Bros. Television, the series was officially approved for broadcast and thirteen episodes were commissioned on May 11, 2007. The show was added to the schedule on Thursday nights at 10:02 p.m. EST (9:02PM CT). It premiered on September 27, 2007, on ABC, following Grey's Anatomy. It also premiered on CTV in Canada on the same date, but was shifted to CTV's secondary A-Channel effective October 25, 2007.

ABC pulled Big Shots from the schedule in December 2007, and filled its slot with repeats of Private Practice. On December 15, 2007, ABC announced its mid-season schedule, and Big Shots was back on the schedule. Despite the original commission of thirteen episodes, as a result of the Writers Guild of America strike in Hollywood, only eleven were made. The final one aired on January 24, 2008. On May 13, 2008, ABC officially cancelled the series.

== Plot ==
The show was officially pitched as "the story of four friends at the top of their game... until the women in their lives enter the room. Lines between boardroom and bedroom blur when these competitive but dysfunctional CEOs take refuge in their friendship, discussing business, confiding secrets, seeking advice and supporting each other through life's surprising twists and turns."

During the show's short run, each character had one to three major plot arcs that generally did not overlap. The principal characters were tied by their wealthy lifestyles, friendship and regular visits to their men's club, where they commiserated while engaging in leisure activities in the sauna, pool room, golf course, tennis courts, bowling and the like. James was promoted to the position of his late boss, but discovered that his wife had had an affair with the man. The fallout of the divorce, and his romantic relationship with his VP, Katie, were his main plot lines. Duncan tried to win back his first wife (the mother of his twenty-something daughter). His efforts were thwarted by personal scandal (sex with a trans woman) and the machinations of his professional and personal rival. Additionally, a mentally-troubled young man insinuates himself in Duncan's life, claiming to be his son. Karl takes up a mistress, but quickly ends the relationship. Ironically, his wife (who knows nothing of the affair) becomes the woman's best friend and she moves in with the couple. His story lines center on this ironic situation, along with the couple's infertility. Brody is characterized as hen-pecked at home, and the somewhat put-upon friend of the four. His connections often help them (especially Duncan) in their times of trouble. His chief actions surround his efforts to procure a higher clientele.

== Characters ==
James Walker (Michael Vartan)
Joining Amerimart Industries directly out of Harvard Business School, James has followed in the footsteps of his mentor, and Amerimart's former CEO, Walter Storrs. James previously held various positions within Amerimart, including Director of Business Development, where he led teams in several innovative acquisitions, both domestic and in the E.U.

A native of Lake Forest, Illinois, James received his B.A. in History, magna cum laude, from the University of Wisconsin-Madison in 1991. James earned his M.B.A. from Harvard Business School in 1993, while simultaneously externing in Amerimart's Boston office.

James and his wife Stacey have two children.

Related characters: Stacey Walker (ex-wife)

Duncan Collinsworth (Dylan McDermott)
Duncan Collinsworth, CEO, brings over twenty years of business experience to Reveal Cosmetics. Duncan got his start in the business world when he was still in high school, selling records to his classmates. Over the years, he moved up the ladder at various companies, running the gamut from the real estate to office supplies, until Duncan found his true calling in the cosmetics industry.

During his tenure, Duncan has transformed Reveal from a local mom and pop company specializing in day creams to a multi-billion dollar enterprise which produces some of the world's most popular cosmetics. After a scandal erupted involving Duncan and a transsexual hooker, he was fired from his job as CEO, but later regained the position.

Related characters: Lisbeth Collinsworth (ex-wife), Cameron (daughter), Zack (imposter son)

Karl Mixworthy (Joshua Malina)
Mixworthy was appointed President of Flexor Williams in 2004, after having served as Director of Product Development. Prior to joining the company, Karl brings tremendous knowledge of drug discovery to Flexor Williams. He received his Masters in Business Administration from Harvard Business School while simultaneously completing his M.A. in Molecular Biology from the Massachusetts Institute of Technology. Karl received his B.S. in Microbiology from Johns Hopkins University. He graduated from Scarsdale High School, where he was admittedly an unpopular student who was regularly bullied.

Mixworthy played a noteworthy role in the development of Flexor Williams' popular drug, Phocustin, which both improves an individual's ability to focus on various matters simultaneously, while alleviating symptoms of stress associated with such 'multi tasking,' as well as treating erectile dysfunction.

Related characters: Wendy (wife); Marla (former mistress)

Brody Johns (Christopher Titus)
Brody Johns has long been regarded as one of the country's leading experts in crisis management and effective crisis communications. In 1999, Brody founded Alpha Crisis Management, focusing on the effective handling of crises, in the government, corporate and entertainment arenas.

Brody has successfully counseled several of the country's most respected companies in crisis management, public relations and crisis communications, as well as advising such entities on threats associated with the growing problem of corporate espionage. In addition, Brody is quickly becoming known for his successful track record in effectively dealing with various personal scandals associated with high profile celebrities. Brody's unparalleled ability to remain calm and clear headed in such tabloid ready matters has won him the loyalty of clients around the world.

Johns received his B.A. from Harvard University in 1989. In one episode he also mentioned that he went to a year of law school.

Related characters: Janelle (wife)

== Main crew ==
- Paul Blackthorne (9 episodes, 2007-2008)
- Michael Katleman (3 episodes, 2007-2008)
- Rob Thomas (3 episodes, 2007-2008)
- Brian Burns (2 episodes, 2007-2008)
- Daniel Truly (2 episodes, 2007-2008)
- Jon Harmon Feldman (Head Writer)
- Emily Whitesell
- Joshua Levey
- Susan Edelman
- Jason Roberts

== Episodes ==
No.	Title	Directed by	Written by	Original release date
1	"Pilot"	Charles McDougall	Jon Harmon Feldman	September 27, 2007
In the premiere episode, we're introduced to the four: James Walker, the group's moral center, not only sees his professional life almost crumble in an instant thanks to a corporate shakeup at AmeriMart Industries, but he learns something even worse about his wife; Brody Johns, Senior Vice President of Alpha Crisis Management, finds out his professional success won't matter if he can't magnificently create a birthday party for his wife; Karl Mixworthy, the sweet yet always nervous CEO of a large pharmaceutical company, has a loving wife and a cunning mistress who is beginning to monopolize whatever free time he can muster; and Duncan Collinsworth, the sexy, divorced CEO of Reveal Cosmetics, has built his company into the industry leader, but suddenly finds his personal life threatened by rumor of an indiscretion that could turn his world upside down.
2	"Tall Dark and Hairless"	Chris Long	Jon Harmon Feldman	October 4, 2007
James decides to fight for his marriage just as suspicions surface regarding the death of his former boss; Duncan attempts to seduce a beautiful reporter in hopes of killing a career-ending expos on him; Karl's wife, Wendy, demands Marla join them in couples therapy; and Brody takes drastic action to spice up sex with his wife.
3	"The Good, The Bad, and the Really Ugly"	Michael Spiller	Brian Burns	October 11, 2007
James has difficulty jumping back into the dating scene; Duncan receives news that his name appears in Dontrelle's "little black book" and seeks Brody's help; Karl and Marla find out that a private investigator has given Wendy incriminating photographs; and Terrence, Duncan's rival, offers Cameron a job at his company.
4	"Three's a Crowd"	Jeff Melman	Emily Whitesell	October 18, 2007
James falls for and begins sleeping with a sexy consultant with plans to shake things up at Amerimart, much to Katie's chagrin; Duncan struggles with his newfound monogamy to Lisbeth as Fashion Week approaches and old flings pay him a visit; Karl arranges a date for Marla with one of his company's chemists at Wendy's request; and Brody tries to track down Dontrelle's black book before Terrence finds it and publishes Duncan's indiscretion.
5	"Greatest Amerimart Hero"	David Solomon	Rob Thomas & Daniel Truly	October 25, 2007
James finds out that his ex-wife's new boyfriend has been spending time with his children; Duncan's relationship with Lisbeth is put in jeopardy when their weekend plans are thwarted by blackmail; and Karl and Wendy are ordered to have sex by their therapist.
6	"Car Trouble"	Michael Katleman	S : Steve Baldikoski & Bryan Behar; T : Rob Thomas	November 1, 2007
Duncan tries to win Lisbeth back with a grand gesture when he discovers she and Terrence are dating exclusively; James struggles with his romantic relationship to an anchor of a TV business show after she publicly lambastes his job performance; Wendy's desire to have a baby worries Karl because of her depression after past failed attempts; and Cameron gets to know her new coworker.
7	"Who's Your Daddy"	Wendey Stanzler	Diane Ruggiero	November 8, 2007
Duncan's reputation could block a huge deal for Reveal, so he enlists Cameron to help him appear like a perfect father; James tries to patch up hard feelings between his girlfriend and Katie as he wrestles with telling Katie the truth about her boyfriend; Brody's father-in-law pays the guys a visit and rubs them all the wrong way; Karl struggles with Wendy's wanting him to sleep with Marla, his ex-mistress, so they can have a baby; and Cameron tries to deal with Zack's shocking news.
8	"The Way We Weren't"	Elodie Keene	Emily Whitesell	November 29, 2007
Duncan tests his sense of adventure as he goes to great lengths to reclaim his title at Reveal; James puts his current relationships aside to focus on a custody battle when Stacey tells him she's moving to California; Karl confronts his past when his high school bully makes a bid for membership at Firmwood; and Brody taps into his creative side when he discovers hidden love-poems written to Janelle by old lovers.
9	"The Better Man"	Ron Lagomarsino	Rob Thomas & Daniel Truly	January 10, 2008
As the eve of Lisbeth's wedding to Terrence approaches, Duncan turns his attention to business and stealing a rising supermodel from a rival cosmetics company; James decides that the wedding is the perfect opportunity for him and Katie to go on a real date; unable to deal with Janelle's badgering, Brody finds the charms of a sexy stranger increasingly irresistible; and Cameron learns the truth about Zack.
10	"Sex Be Not Proud"	Michael Katleman	Brian Burns & Jennifer Schuur	January 17, 2008
After James and Katie have sex, James wants to go public about his relationship with Katie, but she wants to keep it a secret; Duncan butts heads with the Reveal board's new chairman Terrence on a potential PR disaster; Brody jumps at the chance to work closely with a baseball star, then finds himself caught between his client's crises and Janelle's whim; and someone will die.
11	"Who's The Boss"	Michael Grossman	Diane Ruggiero & Robert Hull	January 24, 2008
Lisbeth becomes the chairperson of Reveal following Terrence's death, but Terrence's sister (and Duncan's ex) enters the picture, starting trouble. Meanwhile James and Katie try to figure out their relationship at work and away from work, Karl and Marla tell Wendy about their affair and Marla's pregnancy, and Brody tries to hide his new bachelor pad from Janelle.

== Reception ==
Though not universal, early critical response was generally negative. Referring to Desperate Housewives, Newsweek said "it's not into the toilet, which is where Big Shots spends its time both literally and figuratively." The Los Angeles Times said the show features "a quartet of rich guys so insufferable, self-centered and whiny that they make the men of feminist masterwork 'The Golden Notebook,' or even 'The Nanny Diaries,' look positively heroic." People magazine called the show one of several "Sex and the City clones" and the characters "Entourage-wannabes". Since the show was pitched as a behind-the-scenes look at male bonding pitched to a female target audience, much of the critique focused on the show's failure in that regard. USA Today said simply "The problem with Big Shots is that the men don't sound like anyone at all, male or female." Critics from The A.V. Club compared the show to AMC's Mad Men, saying that it was "contemporary and no where near as good". In one notably positive review, The New York Times called the show "one of television’s rare examples of successful farce."

== U.S. Nielsen ratings ==
In the following chart, "rating" is the percentage of all households with televisions that tuned to the show, and "share" is the percentage of all televisions in use at that time that are tuned in. "18–49" is the percentage of all adults aged 18–49 tuned into the show. "Viewers" are the number of viewers, in millions, watching at the time.

Unless otherwise cited, the overnight rating and share information come from http://www.zap2it.com/tv/ratings/

=== Weekly ratings ===
#	Episode	Air Date	Time slot (EST)	Rating	Share	18-49 (Rating/Share)	Viewers (m)	Rank (Overall)
1	"Pilot"	September 27, 2007	Thursday, 10:00 P.M	7.8	13	4.7/13	11.10	#29
2	"Tall, Dark and Hairless"	October 4, 2007	Thursday, 10:00 P.M.	6.1	10	3.7/10	10.14	#50
3	"The Good, the Bad and the Really Ugly"	October 11, 2007	Thursday, 10:00 P.M.	6.3	11	3.9/11	9.28	#53
4	"Three's a Crowd"	October 18, 2007	Thursday, 10:00 P.M.	6.0	10	3.3/9	8.34	#53
5	"Greatest Amerimart Hero"	October 25, 2007	Thursday, 10:00 P.M.	5.7	9	3.3/7	8.08	#61
6	"Car Trouble"	November 1, 2007	Thursday, 10:00 P.M.	6.2	10	3.7/10	7.53	#54
7	"Who's Your Daddy"	November 8, 2007	Thursday, 10:00 P.M.	5.9	10	3.6/9	8.62	#59
8	"The Way We Weren't"	November 29, 2007	Thursday, 10:00 P.M.	4.1	7	2.4/7	5.98	#79
9	"The Better Man"	January 10, 2008	Thursday, 10:00 P.M.	4.7	8	2.6/8	6.76	#52
10	"Sex Be Not Proud"	January 17, 2008	Thursday, 10:00 P.M.	3.5	6	1.8/5	4.78	#69
11	"Who's the Boss"	January 24, 2008	Thursday, 10:00 P.M.	3.6	6	1.8/5	4.97	N/A

=== Seasonal ranking ===
Based on average total viewers per episode of Big Shots on ABC:

Season	Timeslot (EDT)	Season Premiere	Season Finale	TV Season	Rank	Viewers (in millions)
1	Thursday 10:00 P.M. (2007-2008)	September 27, 2007	January 24, 2008	2007-2008	#88	7.7
