= Legacy (2008 film) =

- US DVD cover
- Directed by: Irving Rothberg
- Written by: Jason Dudek; Kevan Peterson (uncredited); Samantha Silver
- Produced by: Jason Dudek; Michael Kolko
- Starring: Haylie Duff; Madeline Zima; Monica Lo; Margo Harshman; Brett Claywell; Tom Green
- Cinematography: Joseph M. Setele
- Edited by: Josh Muscatine
- Music by: Jay Israelson
- Distributed by: High Fliers Films
- Release date: August 12, 2008
- Running time: 72 minutes
- Country: United States
- Language: English

Legacy, also known as Pretty Little Devils, is a 2008 American direct-to-video black comedy film directed by Irving Rothberg. It stars Haylie Duff, Madeline Zima, Monica Lo, Margo Harshman, Brett Claywell and Tom Green.

The film was released on August 12, 2008 in the United States under the title Legacy.

== Plot ==
When a geeky legacy is found dead at the hottest sorority on campus, the three most popular girls of the house are prime suspects. The film follows the three girls as they try to prove their innocence.

== Cast ==
- Haylie Duff as Lana Stephens
- Madeline Zima as Zoey Martin
- Monica Lo as Mai
- Brett Claywell as Jeff Cook
- Donnell Rawlings as Det. Sams
- Tom Green as Det. Stras
- Kate Albrecht as Katie Whittington
- Jane Sibbett as Mrs. Whittington
- Margo Harshman as Nina
- Laura Ashlee Innes as Emily Barton
- Shani Pride as Tina
- Kelly Frye as Alison
- Joseph Ferrante as Santocki
- Rodney Perry as Jaul
- Brendan Miller as Matty
- Marisa Guterman as Fanny Applebaum
- Ian Nelson as James
- Laura Ortiz as Pamela
- Jillian Murray as Megan Woods
- Rachel Melvin as Julie
- Brooke Paller as Stevie
- Heather Hogan as Marilyn
- Alicia Ziegler as Molly
- Katie Chonacas as Rho Chi
- Katrina Begin as Rachel

== Reception ==
Most reviews were negative. A male reviewer from Chud said the movie was a "Sydney White meets The Usual Suspects" and it's "lightweight fluff that doesn’t even reach the low expectations of the girls it is aimed for (it is Rated R)." However, he praised Haylie Duff's performance saying she was "competent in her role".
