= The Debarted (Gossip Girl) =

- Gossip Girl episode
- Blair helps Chuck in grieving the anniversary of his father's death.
- Episode no.: Season 3 Episode 12
- Directed by: Jason Ensler
- Written by: Stephanie Savage
- Production code: 312
- Original air date: December 7, 2009

Guest appearances
- Robert John Burke as Bart Bass; Holley Fain as Maureen van der Bilt; Laura Harring as Elizabeth Fisher; Sherri Saum as Holland Kemble; Connor Paolo as Eric van der Woodsen; Sarah Steele as Kira Abernathy; Aaron Tveit as Tripp van der Bilt; Kevin Zegers as Damian Daalgard

Episode chronology
← Previous "The Treasure of Serena Madre"	Next → "The Hurt Locket"
- Gossip Girl season 3

"The Debarted" is the 55th episode of the CW television series, Gossip Girl. It was also the twelfth episode of the show's third season. The episode was written by executive producer and one of the series' creator Stephanie Savage and directed by Jason Ensler. It originally aired on Monday, December 7, 2009, on the CW.

== Plot ==
On the first anniversary of Bart Bass' death, Chuck wrestles with hallucinations of Bart (Robert John Burke), who tells him that he is weak. Blair seeks Lily's help in coercing Chuck to visit his father's grave. Meanwhile, Lily cannot find the letter from Serena's father that she left in her coat. She doesn't realize that she put the letter in Maureen's coat instead of her own.

In Long Island, Serena stays with Tripp (Aaron Tveit) in a cottage after leaving New York City when her mother found out about their affair. Tripp leaves Serena to speak with his grandfather regarding his divorce from Maureen (Holley Fain). Nate then tells Serena that his grandfather is in Bermuda. Tripp contacted Maureen in order to protect his political career. Maureen arrives at the cottage and gives Serena an ultimatum: Maureen would stay married to Tripp to protect their social statuses, and Serena could be Tripp's private mistress. Maureen then shows Serena the letter from her father that reveals an affair between him and Lily. Upon his return, Serena refuses to speak to Tripp, and she makes him take her home. While arguing, Tripp swerves to avoid hitting an animal, and he crashes his car. In order to avoid being seen with Serena, Tripp calls 911 and leaves the scene. When Nate arrives, Serena tells him that Tripp was driving. He hunts his cousin down, who begs for news on Serena's condition. Nate punches Tripp, and Maureen makes him leave with her. Serena survives the crash, and Nate sleeps in her hospital room all night.

Back in New York, Eric (Connor Paolo) continues to sabotage Jenny's reign as queen. He teams up with Kira (Sarah Steele) to turn Jenny's minions against her. In the end, Jenny outwits him, and he tells Kira that they will try again soon. When Jenny and Eric see each other at the hospital after Serena's accident, they apologize and call a truce. Meanwhile, Dan and Vanessa attempt to navigate their newly complicated friendship. Dan seeks a new potential relationship with one of Vanessa's friends, Winna. He cannot bring himself to hook up with Winna, and he is forced to leave her when Lily calls him regarding Serena's accident. He then finds Blair and goes with her and Vanessa to the hospital. Lily arrives at the hospital, and she tells Serena that Rufus still does not know about the letter. Serena asks her mother to leave, and Blair arrives to find Chuck. He reveals to Blair that he regrets running away when his father died. Blair tells him that he only ran away from his feelings, and Chuck decides to visit his father's grave. He discovers a woman (Laura Harring) leaving yellow roses at his father's grave. The woman recognizes him, but she quickly flees, leaving only a locket with Bart's picture and the letter E.

The episode concludes when Maureen arrives at Lily and Rufus' apartment, and she gives Rufus the letter that Lily hid from him. Rufus then goes to talk to Holland Kemble (Sherri Saum) at a bar. While at the hospital, Dan tells Vanessa that he loves her, but she doesn't return his feelings. Finally, Jenny is seen meeting Damien (Kevin Zegers) for another drug deal.

== Production ==
For the mid-season finale of the show's third season, Leighton Meester was dressed in an Escada coat, a Valentino bag, black fleece Brooks Brothers skirt, black Falke fishnet tights, and Lanvin pumps. Meester also sported an Alexander McQueen dogstooth print blouse for the episode. InStyle praised Meester's attire, calling it "an eyeful of style".

== Reception ==
"The Debarted" received mostly positive reviews. Isabelle Carreau of TV Squad said that the episode should have aired in January, given how many cliffhangers the episode had, because it would have a better rating. He also praised the episode's main storylines, involving Chuck dealing with the one-year anniversary of his father's death, Serena and Tripp's relationship and Dr. Van der Woodsen's mysterious letter. Jennifer Sankowski, from the TV Guide, had criticized Dan and Vanessa's storyline, replying that "this plot line felt a bit rushed, like there wasn't much room for it in this episode". However, she had praised the scene where Nate punches his cousin by commenting, "He so deserved that!". When it comes to Chuck's storyline, she said, "It was a refreshing change to see dark Chuck again." She later mentioned that she "forgot just how cruel Chuck can be".

The actions taken by Serena in this episode, however, were mainly criticized. Enid Portuguez from Los Angeles Times said, "Her judgment has been more than impaired lately." He goes on to say, "If it weren't for the wolves that caused Trip's Range Rover to swerve", he was sure that Serena would actually have accepted being Tripp's secret mistress. He gave a negative review to Blake Lively's performances in the episode, by saying in other words that Serena's accident "was the only head injury I have ever cheered for." He also said that when it comes to Lily and Rufus's problems in their marriage, he would expect "a showdown between Rufus and Dr. Van der Woodsen".
