= Jason Ensler =

American director

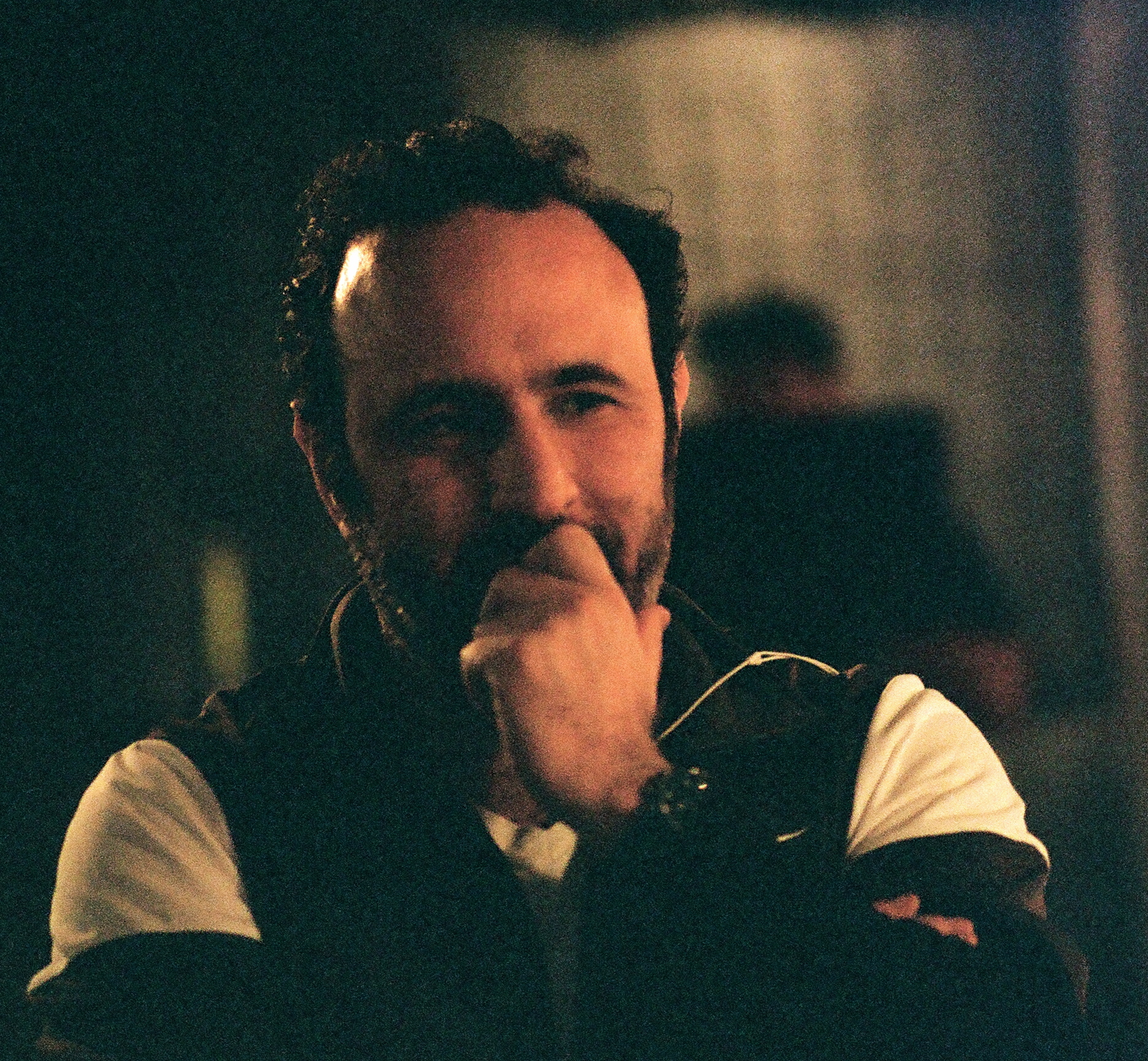
- Born: July 21, 1970 (age 56)
- Occupations: Director and producer
- Years active: 2001–present
- Spouse: Rebecca McFarland (m. 2013)

Jason Ensler is an American director, producer, and screenwriter.

== Early life ==
Jason Ensler attended Brandeis University where he earned a BA in Politics and Theater. He graduated from the USC School of Cinematic Arts with an MFA in Cinema/Television production.

== Career ==
Ensler began his work in television as a director at NBC 2000, a division of NBC promo. He designed launch campaigns for The West Wing, Scrubs, Frasier, Third Watch, the Olympics, and the National Basketball Association. He wrote and directed The Zucker Follies, a musical mockumentary starring Megan Mullally, Martin Sheen, and Sean Hayes.

Ensler’s first film was Behind the Camera: The Unauthorized Story of Three's Company for NBC, which documents the set of the show Three's Company. He has since directed and executive produced the pilots for Andy Barker, P.I., Franklin & Bash, Hart of Dixie, Cult, The Passage, Monarch, and Wolf Pack, among others. He served as executive producer and series director on Fox's The Exorcist and on all three seasons of Love, Victor on Hulu and Disney+.

His other television directing credits include Scrubs, The West Wing, Brooklyn Nine-Nine, Kath & Kim, Sirens, Hostages, The Newsroom, Will Trent, and The Old Man. He is an executive producer and director on season two of Percy Jackson and the Olympians.

=== Documentaries ===
Ensler is on the executive board of Shifting Baselines, a think tank and production entity founded and run by Randy Olson, that seeks to find more effective ways of communicating science to the public. Ensler produced, directed and edited IRIS, a documentary for the Children's Hospital Los Angeles about retinoblastoma, a rare form of children's eye cancer, which was effective in passing legislation in California for early detection. He produced, directed, and edited Farewell, My Subaru, a short documentary about author Doug Fine and his carbon-neutral lifestyle in rural New Mexico.

== Filmography ==
=== Films ===
| Year | Title | Credit | Role | Notes |
|---|---|---|---|---|
| 2006 | Grilled | Director | | |
| 2001 | Kissing Jessica Stein | Additional editor and creative consultant | | |
| 2000 | Alcatraz Avenue | | TR Jones | |
| 1999 | 12 Stops on the Road to Nowhere | Editor | | |
| 1998 | The List | Producer | Roxy Emcee | |

=== Television ===
| Year | Title | Credit | Notes/Episodes |
|---|---|---|---|
| 2025-2026 | Percy Jackson and the Olympians | Director | 3 episodes Season 2, episode 3 Season 2, episode 4 Season 2, episode 7 |
| 2024 | The Old Man | Director | Season 2, episode 7 |
| 2024-2026 | Will Trent | Director | 2 episodes Season 2, episode 3 Season 4, episode 2 |
| 2023 | Wolf Pack | Director | 1 episode Season 1, episode 1 |
| 2022 | Monarch | Director | 1 episode Season 1, episode 1 |
| 2020-2022 | Love, Victor | Director | 9 episodes Season 1, episode 2 Season 1, episode 10 Season 2, episode 1 Season 2, episode 4 Season 2, episode 10 Season 3, episode 1 Season 3, episode 4 Season 3, episode 6 Season 3, episode 8 |
| 2019 | The Passage | Director | 4 episodes Season 1, episode 1 Season 1, episode 2 Season 1, episode 3 Season 1, episode 9 |
| 2017 | 2 Broke Girls | Director | 1 episode Season 6, episode 12 |
| 2017 | The Exorcist | Director Executive producer | 3 episodes Season 2, episode 201 Season 2, episode 206 Season 2, episode 210 |
| 2016 | Lethal Weapon | Director | 2 episodes Season 1, episode 104 Season 1, episode 108 |
| 2016 | Grace and Frankie | Director | 1 episode Season 2, episode 9 |
| 2016 | The Exorcist | Director | 2 episodes Season 1, episode 105 Season 1, episode 110 |
| 2016 | Transylvania Rising | Director | Failed TV pilot |
| 2014 | Red Band Society | Director Executive producer | 3 episodes 1 season |
| 2014 | Sirens | Director | 2 episodes |
| 2013 | Hostages | Director | Season 1, episode 2 |
| 2013 | Brooklyn Nine-Nine | Director | Season 1, episode 5 |
| 2013 | The Goldbergs | Director | Season 1, episode 4 |
| 2013 | The Newsroom | Director | Season 2, episode 8 |
| 2013 | Cult | Director Executive producer | 12 episodes Season 1, episode 1 |
| 2011-2012 | Franklin & Bash | Director Executive producer | 7 episodes 19 episodes |
| 2011 | Hart of Dixie | Director Executive producer | Season 1, episode 1 Season 1, episode 2 |
| 2009 | Gossip Girl | Director | Season 3, episode 12 |
| 2009 | The Eastmans | Director and co-executive producer | TV movie |
| 2008-2009 | Kath & Kim | Director and co-executive producer | 6 episodes |
| 2008 | Man of Your Dreams | Director | TV movie |
| 2008 | Psych | Director | Season 2, episode 12 |
| 2007-2008 | Chuck | Director | Season 1, episode 3 Season 1, episode 9 Season 2, episode 1 |
| 2007 | My Name Is Earl | Director | Season 3, episode 12 |
| 2007 | Andy Barker, P.I. | Director and producer | 6 episodes |
| 2007 | The World According to Barnes | Director | TV movie |
| 2006 | South Beach | Director | 2 episodes |
| 2006 | Help Me Help You | Director | 2 episodes |
| 2005 | The West Wing | Director | Season 6, episode 18 |
| 2004 | Scrubs | Director | Season 3, episode 18 |
| 2004 | Ed | Director | Season 4, episode 13 |
| 2003 | Martha, Inc.: The Story of Martha Stewart | Director | TV movie |
| 2003 | Behind the Camera: The Unauthorized Story of 'Three's Company' | Director | TV special |
