= Jon Harmon Feldman =

American screenwriter and director

Jon Harmon Feldman (born 1967) is an American screenwriter and director.

He has created and worked on TV series such as The Wonder Years; Tru Calling; Reunion; Dawson's Creek; Doctor, Doctor; American Dreams; Roswell; American Town; Dirty Sexy Money, Big Shots and No Ordinary Family.

He wrote and directed the 1997 romantic comedy Lovelife, starring Matt Letscher, Sherilyn Fenn, Saffron Burrows, Carla Gugino, Jon Tenney, Bruce Davison and Peter Krause.

Feldman won an Audience Award at the 1997 Los Angeles Independent Film Festival for writing Lovelife. The name of his production company is Oh That Gus!, Inc.
