= Kotur =

- Village
- Location in Karnataka, India Kotur (India)
- Coordinates: 17°09′N 78°17′E
- Country: India
- State: Karnataka
- District: Belgaum

Languages
  - Official: Kannada
- Time zone: UTC+5:30 (IST)

Kotur is a village in Belgaum district in Karnataka, India.

== Demography ==
As per the Census India 2011, Kotur village has population of 1704 of which 888 are males and 816 are females.
