= Terror of Frankenstein =

- Directed by: Calvin Floyd
- Screenplay by: Calvin Floyd; Yvonne Floyd
- Based on: Frankenstein by Mary Shelley
- Produced by: Calvin Floyd
- Starring: Leon Vitali; Per Oscarsson; Stacy Dorning; Nicholas Clay; Jan Ohlsson; Olof Bergström; Mathias Henrikson
- Cinematography: Tony Forsberg; John Wilcox
- Edited by: Susanne Linnman
- Production companies: Aspect; National Film Society of Ireland
- Distributed by: Independent-International Pictures (United States)
- Release date: 3 January 1977
- Running time: 92 minutes
- Countries: Sweden; Republic of Ireland
- Language: English

Terror of Frankenstein (alternatively titled Victor Frankenstein) is a 1977 Gothic horror science fiction drama film directed by Calvin Floyd, based on the 1818 novel Frankenstein; or, The Modern Prometheus by Mary Shelley. Starring Leon Vitali, Per Oscarsson, Stacy Dorning, Nicholas Clay, and Mathias Henrikson, the film tells the story of young anatomist Victor Frankenstein and his battle with a creature of his own making.

The film’s footage was reused in a 2016 comedy called Director’s Commentary: Terror of Frankenstein, directed by Tim Kirk and produced by Rodney Ascher. The film is a spoof of film commentaries, starring the voices of Clu Gulager and Zack Norman as heavily fictionalized versions of the filmmakers of Terror of Frankenstein, with Vitali also appearing as himself.

== Plot ==
Swiss student Victor Frankenstein becomes obsessed with the application of occult principles to modern science. He leaves his family and his fiancee Elizabeth for university in Geneva to study anatomy. His mentor, Professor Waldheim, warms him to keep check of his macabre ambitions. He conducts an experiment to create life from dead matter, privately assembling a humanoid creature from bodies acquired from a morgue and reanimated by his inventions. When the Monster wakes, Victor is horrified by it and flees in a delirious state. Henry Clerval visits an addled Victor, who comes to believe that he had imagined the entire event. The Monster wanders, mute and childlike, in search of food and shelter. He learns to speak and read by secretly observing a family, who he attempts to befriend but is attacked. His loneliness and curiosity leads him back to the laboratory, where he learns of his creation and vows revenge.

Back at his family home in Switzerland, Victor begins to recover and spends time with Elizabeth and his younger brother William, who is subsequently murdered. Victor meets with the Monster, who confesses to killing William. Threatening the Frankenstein family, the Monster demands that Victor creates a mate for him. Victor goes to Scotland and begins to build the female creature in a makeshift laboratory, but fears what would happen if the creatures reproduce. He destroys the female; in retaliation, the Monster kills Clerval.

Victor returns to Elizabeth to be married, unknowingly pursued by the Monster who murders Elizabeth. Victor leaves his home forever and vows to kill his creation, pursuing the creature over the following years until he finds the ship of Captain Walton, which has become trapped in the ice on an expedition to the North Pole. Sickly and near death, Victor tells his story to Walton before the Monster sneaks aboard and confronts him one last time. Victor Frankenstein dies and the Monster, unsatisfied with his revenge, wanders into the cold to die.

== Cast ==
- Leon Vitali as Victor Frankenstein
- Per Oscarsson as The Monster
- Stacy Dorning as Elizabeth
- Nicholas Clay as Henry Clerval
- Jan Ohlsson as William
- Olof Bergström as Victor's father
- Mathias Henrikson as Capt. Walton
- Archie O'Sullivan as Professor Waldheim
