= Elizabeth Yoffe =

American film producer

Elizabeth Yoffe is an independent media producer and the producing partner of filmmaker Tony Zierra.

Yoffe received a B.A. in Theater Arts from Bennington College and an M.A. in Education from Antioch University, Seattle. She worked as a regional casting director for film and television projects including Waiting For The Light directed by Christopher Monger starring Shirley MacLaine, Dogfight directed by Nancy Savoca starring River Phoenix and David Lynch’s series, Twin Peaks. In Los Angeles she was president of Cinewomen L.A., a non-profit organization dedicated to advancing the role of women in film.

Yoffe is the producer of the documentary Filmworker about Leon Vitali who was the assistant to director Stanley Kubrick. Filmworker premiered at the 2017 Cannes Film Festival and also screened at Telluride Film Festival, the New York Film Festival, BFI London Film Festival, CPH:DOX, and Sydney Film Festival. The film has received a 95% rating on Rotten Tomatoes. Yoffe produced the documentary My Big Break, directed by Tony Zierra, a cautionary tale about the darker side of celebrity and the consequences of fame. My Big Break won Best Documentary at the Boston Film Festival, Best Documentary at Artsfest, Pennsylvania, was nominated for Best Documentary at the Raindance Film Festival in London and was an official selection of The American Cinematic Experience Festival.

Yoffe also produced USA The Movie, a film that merges reality and fiction to explore the cyclical nature of violence and retaliation in the wake of the September 11 attacks. The film was the subject of an essay by academic and commentator Dion Dennis. She co-produced Carving Out Our Name, an official selection at Toronto International Film Festival and Brightness starring Eric Idle, Chad Lindberg and Fay Masterson. Yoffe is a producer on the 2024 documentary SK13: Kubrick's Endgame directed by Tony Zierra which premiered at the Low Cinema.

Her writing has appeared in The New York Times and Slate.
