= Lorenzo Fonda =

Italian film director and artist

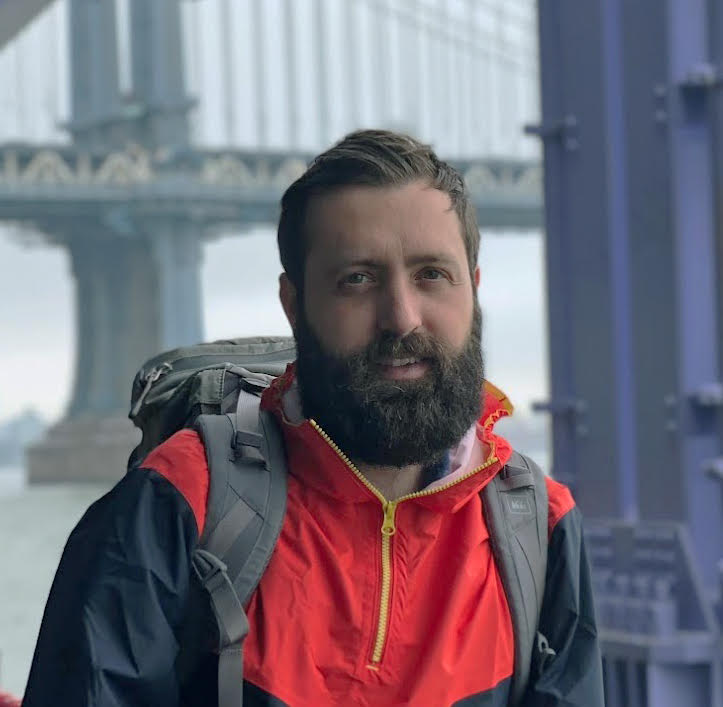
- Fonda in 2019
- Born: November 28, 1979 (age 46); Modena, Italy
- Occupations: Film director and artist
- Years active: 1999–present
- Website: lorenzofonda.work

Lorenzo Fonda (born November 28, 1979) is an Italian-American filmmaker, multi-media artist, and artist. He is recognized for his eclectic use of multi-media techniques and often surreal storytelling.

His works include feature films, commercials, music videos, short films, interactive installations, illustrations, and murals. He is best known for his collaboration with mural artist and animator Blu, which resulted in the feature-length documentary Megunica, shot in 2006 across Mexico, Guatemala, Nicaragua, Costa Rica, and Argentina. During the production of the film, Fonda encouraged Blu to experiment with mixing the stop-motion technique and painting, and the first test they created ended up being included in the film. Subsequently, Blu further explored the technique which led to the creation of the groundbreaking film Muto.

Fonda collaborated with Rodney Ascher on his documentary A Glitch in the Matrix, for which he acted as director of animation. The film premiered at the Sundance Film Festival 2021 and was acquired by Magnolia Pictures.

Other works include music videos for bands such as Caribou, Scissor Sisters, Metronomy, Bright Eyes, Jovanotti, Jamie Woon, Bernhard Fleischmann, For a Minor Reflection and others, as well creating ads for companies such as Nike, Alfa Romeo, San Diego Zoo and Converse. Aside from his commercial works, he directed PSAs for The Humane Society of the United States, National Geographic Channel, Boys & Girls Clubs and World AIDS Day.

In 2008 he crossed the Pacific Ocean aboard the cargo ship Portland Senator, and he made a film about the experience titled Ten things I have learned about the sea, which earned him a Vimeo Staff Pick badge.

His latest graphic novel Per aspera ad astra, published by the Italian publishing company Coconino Press in October 2025, is an autobiographical account of the year after the death of his wife, the illustrator Elena Xausa. Since its release, the book has received very positive reviews and has been highly praised for its emotionally raw and honest quality, with some press outlets calling the book a masterpiece. Wired Magazine and Sky Arte included the book in their best-of-the-year comic books lists, and the renowned art magazine Artribune chose the book as best graphic novel of the year and Lorenzo as best comic artist of the year.

Fonda is currently working on a project revolving around a skateboarding session on the biggest modern sculpture in the world, the Cretto di Burri.

== Filmography ==
=== Feature Length ===
- A Glitch in the Matrix (as Director of Animation) - documentary - (2021)
- Archaeology of the future - documentary - (in production)
- Megunica - documentary - (2008)

=== Other works ===
- "The Brick Wall" - 2018 - (personal short film)
- "The Sound of Heat" - 2011 - (commissioned by MOCA Los Angeles)
- "WARP20 NYC" - (medium-length documentary, commissioned by Warp Records) - 2010
- "Ten things I have learned about the sea" - (personal short) - 2008
- "King of Empty" - (part of PSST! Pass it on project) - 2008
- "Blu + ERICAILCANE - (personal short film) - 2007
- "BIFF opener" - (commissioned by Boston International Film Festival) - 2007

== Awards ==
- 2009 Taiwan International Documentary Festival - Special Merit Prize
- DOC/Fest Sheffield Documentary Film Festival - Grierson Youth Jury Prize Nominee
- Amsterdam International Film Festival 2008 - Best Creative Documentary
- Officinema festival - Concorso Iceberg - Best Documentary
