= Wes Bentley =

American actor (born 1978)

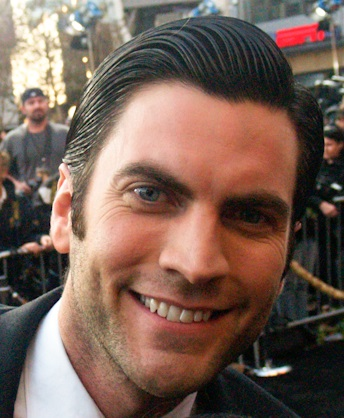
- Bentley in 2012
- Born: September 4, 1978 (age 48); Jonesboro, Arkansas, U.S.
- Education: Juilliard School (attended)
- Occupation: Actor
- Years active: 1995–present
- Spouses: Jennifer Quanz (m. 2001; div. 2009); Jacqui Swedberg (m. 2010)
- Children: 2

Wes Bentley (born September 4, 1978) is an American actor. He is best known for his roles as Ricky Fitts in American Beauty (1999), which earned him a nomination for the BAFTA Award for Supporting Actor, Seneca Crane in The Hunger Games (2012), Doyle in Interstellar (2014), Erik in Mission: Impossible – Fallout (2018), and Jamie Dutton in Yellowstone (2018–2024). He was one of four subjects in the documentary My Big Break (2009), which covered his fame after American Beauty and his subsequent struggles with substance abuse. Rebuilding his career, he starred in the premiere of Venus in Fur by David Ives in the off-Broadway production in 2010. Other film roles include The Four Feathers (2002), Ghost Rider (2007), P2 (2007), and Pete's Dragon (2016).

He began appearing in the FX anthology series American Horror Story in 2014, playing Edward Mordrake in Freak Show. In 2015, he starred as Detective John Lowe in Hotel, for which he received a Critics' Choice Television Award nomination. The following year, he played Dylan (the actor who plays Ambrose White in My Roanoke Nightmare) in the series's sixth cycle, subtitled Roanoke. From 2018 until 2024, Bentley starred in the Paramount Network original television series Yellowstone.

== Early life ==
Bentley was born in Jonesboro, Arkansas, and raised in Little Rock, the third of four sons of Cherie Baker and David Bentley. His father is a minister, and his mother is a chaplain and ordained elder in the Arkansas Conference, both in the United Methodist denomination. His grandfather was an evangelical minister. He is of German, Scottish, and English descent.

In 1996, he graduated from Sylvan Hills High School in Sherwood, Arkansas. He attended the Juilliard School's Drama Division as part of its Group 29 (1996–2000) but left the school after one year to pursue his acting career.

== Career ==
Bentley has starred in several films, including the Oscar-winning American Beauty, The Four Feathers, P2, and Ghost Rider. He starred in the thriller Dolan's Cadillac, based on the short story by Stephen King, and There Be Dragons by director Roland Joffé. Bentley is one of the main subjects in the documentary My Big Break, directed by Tony Zierra, which follows Bentley and three of his former roommates, Chad Lindberg, Brad Rowe and Greg Fawcett, as they pursue their dream to become successful actors in Hollywood. In Ghost Rider (2007), Bentley played Blackheart, a demonic being that served as the main antagonist.

In 2010, he starred opposite Nina Arianda in the premiere of the David Ives play Venus in Fur off-Broadway at the Classic Stage Company in New York City. The production later moved to Broadway, with Hugh Dancy in the role debuted by Bentley.

In March 2012, Bentley had a supporting role in the blockbuster movie The Hunger Games, playing gamemaker Seneca Crane. In 2012, Bentley starred in the indie feature 3 Nights in the Desert, directed by Gabriel Cowan.

Bentley and Scott Speedman starred in a pilot episode for a planned HBO series created by Ryan Murphy, Open, but the series was not picked up. The following year, Bentley guest starred in Murphy's FX series American Horror Story for its fourth season, Freak Show. In 2015, he was promoted to the main cast for the fifth season, Hotel, starring as Detective John Lowe. In 2016, he played a main role in the sixth season, Roanoke. From 2018 to 2024, he played Jamie Dutton on Paramount Network's Yellowstone.

On Jimmy Kimmel Live! on December 9, 2022, Bentley said he previously turned down the role of Peter Parker / Spider-Man in Spider-Man (2002) before Tobey Maguire was eventually cast.

== Personal life ==
Bentley was married to actress Jennifer Quanz from 2001 to 2009. They divorced in 2009, reportedly due to his substance abuse. He married producer Jacqui Swedberg in 2010, and their son was born in 2010 and their daughter in 2014.

In a New York Times article on February 8, 2010, he described his descent into drug addiction that began almost immediately after his success in American Beauty. He said he hid his addiction from his wife; they separated in 2006, and he moved to an apartment where he began doing drugs full-time. During this time, he worked sporadically, just enough to pay bills and buy drugs. His addiction began to cause problems on the sets of the films P2 and Weirdsville. In 2008, he was arrested and ordered into counseling and 12-step programs. He relapsed, however, and "continued using heroin until he was broke".

In July 2009, he said, he confessed to a friend, "I'm a drug addict, and an alcoholic, and I need help. I need help or I'm going to die". He again entered a 12-step program and, while clean since then, considers himself on the path to recovery.

The documentary My Big Break (2009) captures Bentley's early life as an unknown actor, his sudden fame after American Beauty, his subsequent emotional struggle with fame, and his admission years later that he was recovering from an addiction to drugs and alcohol. He began to rebuild his career by starring in the Off-Broadway premiere of the play Venus in Fur by David Ives.

== Filmography ==
=== Film ===
Year	Film	Role	Notes
1995	Serendipity Lane	Lonnie	Short film
1998	Three Below Zero	Julian Flincher	
1998	Beloved	Schoolteacher's Nephew	
1999	American Beauty	Ricky Fitts	
1999	The White River Kid	White River Kid	
2000	The Claim	Donald Daglish	
2001	Carving Out Our Name	Himself	
2001	Soul Survivors	Matt	
2002	The Four Feathers	Jack Durrance	
2005	The Game of Their Lives	Walter Bahr	
2007	Weirdsville	Royce	
2007	Ghost Rider	Blackheart / Legion	
2007	The Perfect Witness	Mickey Gravatski	
2007	P2	Thomas Barclay	
2008	The Last Word	Evan	
2009	The Tomb	Johnathan Merrick	
2009	Dolan's Cadillac	Tom Robinson	
2009	The Greims	Donnie Greims	Short film
2010	Jonah Hex	Adleman Lusk	
2011	Rites of Passage	Benny	
2011	Hirokin	Hirokin	
2011	There Be Dragons	Manolo Torres	
2011	After-School Special	Man	Short film
2012	Underworld: Awakening	Dr. Edward Vronski	Uncredited; credited as Antigen Scientist
2012	Gone	Peter Hood	
2012	The Hunger Games	Seneca Crane	
2012	Stars in Shorts	Man	
2012	The Time Being	Daniel	
2012	Hidden Moon	Victor Brighton	
2012	Hirokin: The Last Samurai	Hirokin	
2013	Lovelace	Thomas	
2013	Pioneer	Mike	
2013	Cesar Chavez	Jerry Cohen	
2014	3 Nights in the Desert	Travis	
2014	After the Fall	Bill Scanlon	
2014	The Better Angels	Mr. Crawford	
2014	Interstellar	Doyle	
2014	Welcome to Me	Gabe Ruskin	
2014	Final Girl	William	
2015	Knight of Cups	Barry	
2015	We Are Your Friends	James Reed	
2015	Amnesiac	Man	
2016	Pete's Dragon	Jack Magary	
2016	Broken Vows	Patrick	
2018	Mission: Impossible – Fallout	Erik	
2019	The Best of Enemies	Floyd Kelly	

=== Television ===
Year	TV	Role	Notes
2011	Tilda	—N/a	Unsold TV pilot
2014	Open	Evan Foster	Unsold TV pilot
2014–2015	American Horror Story: Freak Show	Edward Mordrake	Guest star; 3 episodes
2015–2016	American Horror Story: Hotel	Det. John Lowe	Main role; 11 episodes
2016	American Horror Story: Roanoke	Dylan Conrad (Ambrose White, re-enactment)	Main role; 8 episodes
2018–2024	Yellowstone	Jamie Dutton	Main role; 53 episodes
2021–2022	Blade Runner: Black Lotus	Niander Wallace Jr. (voice)	Main role; 13 episodes
2026	The Shards	Terry Schaffer	

=== Stage ===
Year	Title	Role	Notes
2010	Venus in Fur	Thomas	East 13th Street/CSC Theatre

== Awards and nominations ==
Year	Association	Category	Nominated work	Result
1999	National Board of Review	Best Male Breakthrough Performance	American Beauty	Won
2000	BAFTA Awards	Best Actor in a Supporting Role	American Beauty	Nominated
2000	Blockbuster Entertainment Awards	Favorite Supporting Actor – Drama	American Beauty	Nominated
2000	Chicago Film Critics Association Awards	Most Promising Actor	American Beauty	Won
2000	MTV Movie Awards	Breakthrough Male Performance	American Beauty	Nominated
2000	Online Film Critics Society Awards	Best Supporting Actor	American Beauty	Nominated
2000	Screen Actors Guild Awards	Outstanding Performance by a Cast in a Motion Picture	American Beauty	Won
2000	Teen Choice Awards	Choice Movie Breakout Performance	American Beauty	Nominated
2007	Fright Meter Awards	Best Actor	P2	Nominated
2016	Critics' Choice Television Awards	Best Actor in a Movie or Limited Series	American Horror Story: Hotel	Nominated
2017	MTV Movie & TV Awards	Best Villain	American Horror Story: Roanoke	Nominated
2022	Screen Actors Guild Awards	Outstanding Performance by an Ensemble in a Drama Series	Yellowstone	Nominated
