= The Flats (film) =

- Theatrical release poster
- Directed by: Kelly Requa; Tyler Requa
- Written by: Tyler Requa; Kelly Requa
- Starring: Chad Lindberg; Jude Herrera; Sean Christensen; Cristen Coppen
- Cinematography: Lawrence Schweich
- Distributed by: IndieFlix
- Release date: 2002
- Running time: 102 minutes
- Country: United States
- Language: English

The Flats is a 2002 independent film written and directed by brothers Tyler Requa and Kelly Requa. Filmed near Mt. Vernon and the Skagit Valley of Washington, The Flats was produced by Clear Pictures, LLC and premiered at the 2002 Seattle International Film Festival.

== Plot summary ==
The Flats tells a cautionary tale of friendship and desire played out among a group of 20-somethings transitioning into adulthood. Main character Harper and his buddies make the most of their freedom prior to an impending court-ordered jail sentence. Things get even more serious when Harper and his best friend's girlfriend, Paige, begin a sobering relationship.

== Featured cast ==
- Chad Lindberg as Harper
- Sean Christensen as Luke
- Jude Herrera as Paige
- Cristen Coppen as Kate
- Lindsay Beamish as Jennifer
- Greg Fawcett as Chaz
- Danny Pickering as Mark
- Swil Kanim as Jesse
- Luc Reynaud as Tully
- Paul West Jr. as Luke's Father
- Rabecca Rosencrans as Luke's Mother

== Awards ==
- DC INDEPENDENT FILM FESTIVAL - Grand Jury Special Mention
- KINDRED INTERNATIONAL FILM FESTIVAL - Winner, Best Actor (Chad Lindberg)
- NEW YORK INTERNATIONAL INDEPENDENT FILM FESTIVAL - Winner, Best Score (Sean Christensen), Best Actress (Jude Herrera)
- SEATTLE INTERNATIONAL FILM FESTIVAL
