= Tim Kirk (filmmaker) =

American film director

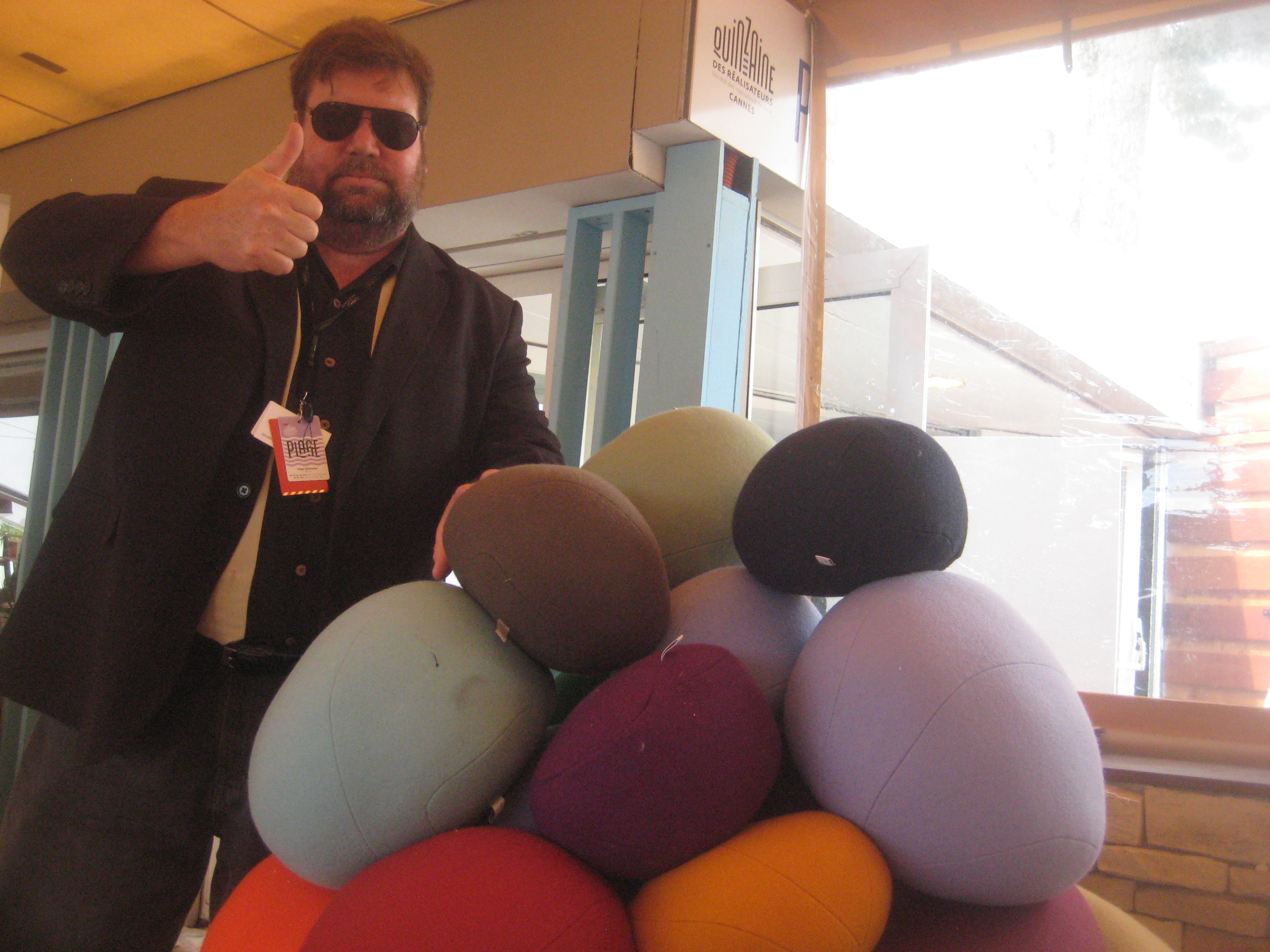
- Tim Kirk at the Cannes Film Festival in 2012
- Born: Timothy Tobin Kirk; October 29, 1962 (age 62); Greencastle, IN, US
- Occupation(s): Film producer, film director, screenwriter, author
- Years active: 1992–present

Tim Kirk is a writer, director, and producer who currently lives in Los Angeles.

He frequently collaborates with director Rodney Ascher, with whom he created the documentary Room 237, which premiered at the 2012 Sundance Film Festival and screened in the Directors' Fortnight section at the 2012 Cannes Film Festival. Kirk also produced Ascher's The Nightmare, The El Duce Tapes, the Shudder original series Primal Screen, and A Glitch in the Matrix.

He wrote and directed the Kickstarter-funded Director's Commentary: Terror of Frankenstein, and Sex Madness Revealed.

His writing includes the 2015 novel Burnt, and the 2019 short fiction anthology The Feral Boy Who Lives in Griffith Park.

== Selected filmography ==
Title	Year	Format	Role
Hot Chicks Anthology: Bewitched	2006	Short	Director
Room 237	2012	Feature	Producer
Tom Explores Los Angeles	2013	Web Series	Producer
The Nightmare	2015	Feature	Producer
Sex Madness Revealed	2018	Feature	Producer, director, writer
And With Him Came The West	2019	Feature	Producer
The El Duce Tapes	2019	Feature	Producer
A Glitch in the Matrix	2021	Feature	Co-executive producer

== Awards and nominations ==
Governing body	Award	Category	Name	Outcome
Gotham Independent Film Awards	Gotham Award	Best Documentary	Rodney Ascher (director), Tim Kirk (producer)	Nominated
