= The Nightmare (2015 American film) =

2015 film by Rodney Ascher

- Theatrical release poster
- Directed by: Rodney Ascher
- Produced by: Ross M. Dinerstein; Tim Kirk; Glen Zipper
- Starring: Nicole Bosworth; Stephen Joseph; Age Wilson
- Cinematography: Bridger Nielson
- Edited by: Saul Herckis
- Music by: Jonathan Snipes
- Production companies: Campfire; Zipper Bros Films
- Distributed by: Gravitas Ventures
- Release date: January 26, 2015 (Sundance)
- Running time: 90 minutes
- Country: United States
- Language: English
- Box office: $28,281

The Nightmare is a 2015 American documentary film directed by Rodney Ascher. The film had its world premiere on January 26, 2015 at the Sundance Film Festival and focuses on the topic of sleep paralysis. Ascher chose his subject because it had happened to him in the past.

The film's crew initially began approaching participants via "message groups, YouTube videos, and a half dozen books that had been written", but found that participants began approaching them after the documentary's premise was announced.

== Synopsis ==
The documentary focuses on people suffering from sleep paralysis, a phenomenon where people find themselves temporarily unable to move, speak, or react to anything while they are falling asleep or awakening. Occasionally this paralysis will be accompanied by physical experiences or hallucinations that have the potential to terrify the individual. In the film, Ascher interviews each participant and then tries to re-create their experiences on film with professional actors.

== Cast ==
- Siegfried Peters as Chris
- Steven Yvette as Shadow Man
- Yatoya Toy as Connie's roommate
- Nicole Bosworth as Forrest's girlfriend
- Elise Robson as Chris's girlfriend
- Age Wilson as Homeless man #2

== Release ==
The Nightmare premiered at the Sundance Film Festival on January 26, 2015, before making its way to South by Southwest on March 13. The film entered a limited theatrical release on June 5, 2015, while also attaining an online release.

=== Critical reception ===
The film received generally positive reviews from critics. It holds a rating of 67% on Rotten Tomatoes, based on 58 reviews. The critic's consensus reads: "Part documentary, part thriller, The Nightmare works just well enough in both respects to deliver a uniquely disturbing viewing experience". On Metacritic, the film has a 69 out of 100 rating based on 16 critics, indicating "generally favorable reviews". Audiences surveyed by CinemaScore gave the film an average grade of "B" on an A+ to F scale.

The film received praise from media outlets such as Indiewire, Screen Daily, and Variety, and Variety wrote that "Mixing talking heads, surreal bedtime re-creations and shamelessly assaultive scare tactics, Ascher's playful, visually inventive sophomore feature isn’t at the same level as Room 237 but that "it shares with its predecessor a warped affection for eccentric storytellers and a desire to give vivid cinematic form to their darkest imaginings, if that is indeed what they are."

Shock Till You Drop remarked on how well the film was received at Sundance where one viewer "cried in gratitude of the film", and went on to state that although Ascher did not consult any professional scientists or doctors, the documentary was still effective in inciting terror.

IGN was more negative, awarding the film a score of 3.5 out of 10 and saying "Like a person floating on the edge of sleep who never quite succumbs, The Nightmare grazes its subject but never truly dives in."
