= My Big Break =

2009 film by Tony Zierra

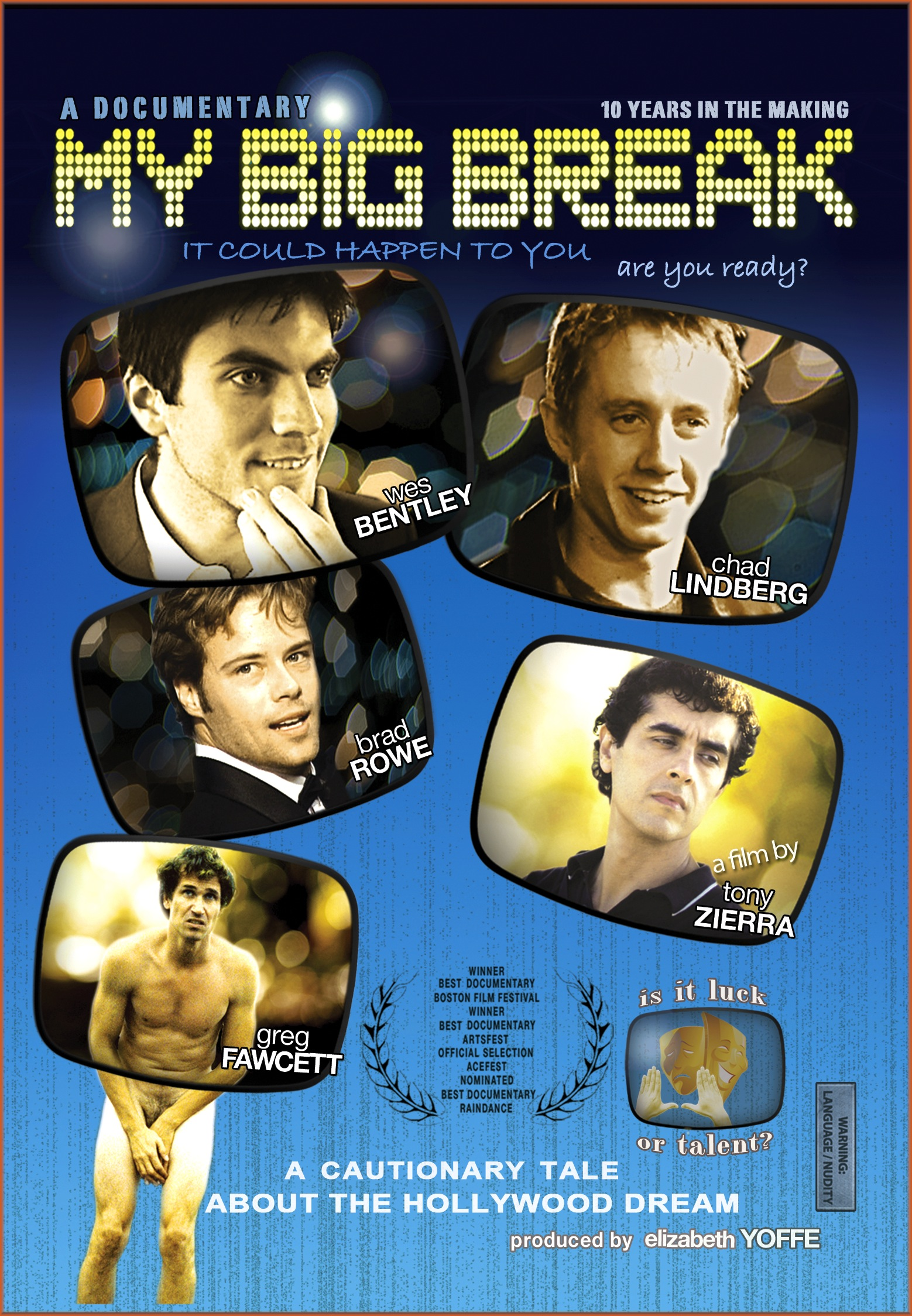
- Film poster
- Directed by: Tony Zierra
- Produced by: Elizabeth Yoffe; Tony Zierra
- Starring: Wes Bentley; Tony Zierra; Brad Rowe; Chad Lindberg; Greg Fawcett
- Music by: David Ben Shannon; Refrag; Alex Ebert
- Release dates: September 2009 (Raindance Film Festival); September 19, 2011
- Country: United States
- Language: English

My Big Break is a 2009 documentary film directed by Tony Zierra starring Wes Bentley, Brad Rowe, Chad Lindberg, Greg Fawcett and Zierra himself. The film was produced by MBB Group, Elizabeth Yoffe and Zierra. It mostly consists of footage taken by Zierra in 1999, when he and the other four were aspiring actors and roommates living in Los Angeles; the film shows some of them (most notably Bentley) enjoying career successes, while others (notably Fawcett) struggle with rejection. Much of the footage had already been included in Zierra's 2001 documentary Carving Out Our Name, which played only once, at the Toronto International Film Festival. My Big Break shows the footage in re-edited form, and includes newer footage of Lindberg, Rowe and Fawcett, discussing their lives in the intervening years.

== Synopsis ==
Filmed over ten years, this controversial documentary follows five roommates trying to make it in Hollywood who face the unexpected consequences of fame.

Tony Zierra, an aspiring filmmaker with no money, stars or crew, resorts to filming the lives of his four struggling actor roommates. Three of the actors, Brad Rowe, Chad Lindberg and Wes Bentley quickly hit it big, while the fourth actor, Greg Fawcett, is nearly driven insane watching the others get famous.

The unsettling reality of stardom starts to set in. Lindberg's hope of becoming a leading man is crushed when he's repeatedly told he doesn't have the right look; Rowe ends up typecast as a pretty boy and can't break past his uncanny resemblance to Brad Pitt; while Bentley, who has a fast career launch, is quickly drawn into the darker side of the L.A. lifestyle. As the actors struggle with life in the public eye, Zierra deals with constant obstacles while he tries to complete his film, including being scrutinized and blocked by the actors' nervous agents. Each of the subjects is tested and changed by their encounters with the film industry.

The documentary ends with a follow-up Zierra filmed when he returns to Hollywood after a five-year absence to find out what happened to each of his former roommates.

== Featured individuals ==
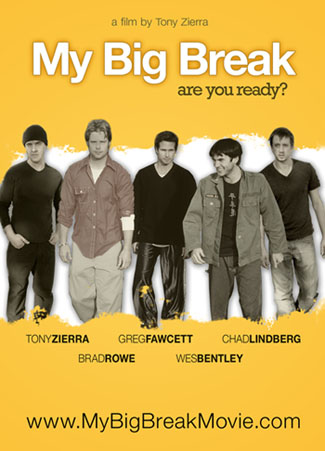
2008 poster for the film

- Wes Bentley as himself
- Chad Lindberg as himself
- Brad Rowe as himself
- Greg Fawcett as himself
- Tony Zierra as himself
- Lee Daniels as himself
- Alex Ebert as himself
- Michael Testa as himself
- Ivana Chubbuck as herself
- Mark Skelly as himself
- Jennifer Quanz as herself
- Andrew Tsao as himself
- Mark Schaller as himself

== Production ==
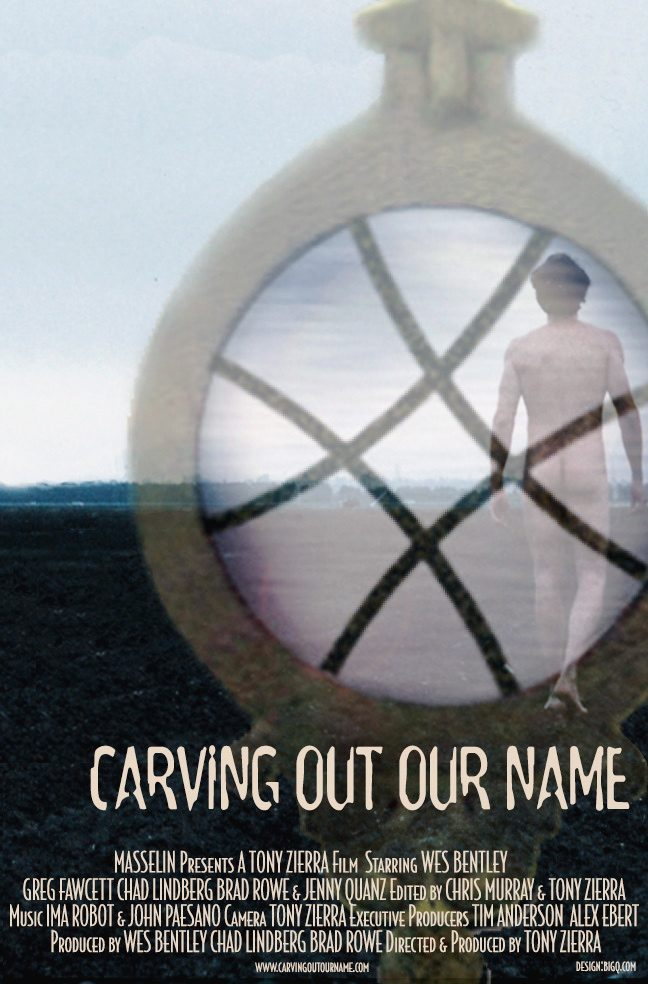

'The production of My Big Break was fraught with setbacks and challenges. Tony Zierra originally intended to shoot a fiction film but while trying to find a script and secure financing he decided to film his roommates, Wes Bentley, Chad Lindberg, Brad Rowe and Greg Fawcett, who were struggling actors. He thought that their pursuit of success in the film business would make an interesting story. He self-financed the production through the money he made at various jobs and by other means such as holding garage sales.

Zierra ended up filming almost every aspect of his roommates' lives. He thought that it was possible that one of them might beat the odds and get some kind of break but more likely they would all end up leaving Hollywood discouraged. Whatever happened, Zierra felt that it would make for an intriguing film.

However, three of the roommates ended up becoming successful quickly. Brad Rowe was cast as the love interest in Billy's Hollywood Screen Kiss, an independent gay-themed romantic comedy that was a hit at the Sundance Film Festival. The film launched Rowe's career, he was featured prominently on the cover of US Magazine and labeled "The Next Big Thing". Chad Lindberg was cast in the film October Sky and in many television shows such as Buffy the Vampire Slayer, ER and The X-Files. Wes Bentley won the coveted part of Ricky Fitts in the Oscar-winning film American Beauty and became an overnight sensation. Zierra, who had already been following his roommates lives before they got their breaks, was able to capture their success on camera as it happened.

Once the actors became successful, Zierra's project began to draw interest from the media and film industry insiders. However, that interest didn't immediately translate into financial backing which, as years passed, made continuing to film increasingly difficult. Additionally, the interest also brought problems as the people who handled the business end of the actors' burgeoning careers began to worry about the content of the footage that Zierra had of his roommates. The representatives of Wes Bentley at the William Morris Agency were particularly concerned. Zierra refused requests to show the footage to anyone until he had finished filming.

In 2001, Zierra began to edit the 200+ hours of footage into a film titled Carving Out Our Name, a name taken from a line in the Counting Crows song Round Here. At the time, there were no non-linear editing systems that could allow independent filmmakers a way to edit their projects on a modest budget. Editing costs were exorbitant, so from week to week Zierra had to find a variety of ways to raise money to continue with post-production. He bartered, negotiated percentages of ownership in the future finished film, and borrowed on credit cards. After dealing with repeated obstacles he finally completed Carving Out Our Name with backing from his friends Alex Ebert and Tim Anderson of the band Ima Robot. Ebert and Anderson became the executive producers and wrote most of the score for the film.

Carving Out Our Name emphasized the friendship among the roommates and their personal relationships with the women in their lives. The documentary was completed at a relatively high point in the actors' careers so it did not show a full range of highs and lows in their lives. Carving Out Our Name was accepted into the 2001 Toronto International Film Festival and premiered on the evening of September 10. It was extremely well received by the audience of 1000 people and generated a great deal of interest from the media and potential distributors. At the film premiere afterparty, Zierra's agent, Cassian Elwes from William Morris Independent, wanted to discuss the deals that were being offered by distributors, but Zierra felt he should honor the friendship that Carving Out Our Name had captured over the years and just let everybody "enjoy themselves"; he decided to wait until the morning to discuss business with Elwes. However, the September 11 attacks occurred the next morning, and the Toronto International Film Festival was cancelled.

Carving Out Our Name was never released due to a combination of factors, including changes in the market after the 9/11 and concerns by insiders in Hollywood that the film might have a negative impact on the actors' careers. In the early 2000s, filmmakers in Zierra's position were completely dependent on the tightly controlled Hollywood distribution system; as online outlets did not yet exist, there were no serious alternatives for independent filmmakers to distribute or market their own films.

Zierra was extremely affected by the experience and suffered an emotional breakdown. He destroyed all copies of Carving Out Our Name, left Hollywood, and cut ties with everyone he had known there, including his former roommates.

Years later, Zierra decided to take the original footage out of storage and begin editing another film that would include his own experience making Carving Out Our Name. By this time, editing a film had become much more cost effective because of the introduction of the user friendly and affordable non-linear editing system Final Cut Pro. Still, starting the film over from the 200+ hours was a massive undertaking. Whereas Carving Out Our Name focused on the success of the actors and their personal relationships, the new film, My Big Break, focuses on the ups and downs of the film business and how fame – or the lack thereof – affected all of them. Alex Ebert, one of the executive producers of Carving Out Our Name, contributed to My Big Break by composing music for the film. Ebert subsequently won a Golden Globe for Best Original Score in 2014 for All Is Lost starring Robert Redford.

After contacting his former roommates, Zierra shot an update with Lindberg, Rowe and Fawcett, each of whom had gone through disappointments and setbacks in the film business. Despite Zierra's repeated attempts, Bentley was unwilling to see him and communicated only through text messages.

Zierra ended up re-editing My Big Break numerous times. During the process he once again found himself dealing with the emotional impact of delving deeply into the story and had to put the film aside for periods of time. The ending of the film proved particularly difficult to lock down because the unresolved tensions between him and Bentley required him to construct Bentley's "update" in ways that never fully satisfied him.

In 2010, Bentley came forward and admitted to the press that his sudden rise to fame had sent him into a spiral of drug addiction from which he was now recovering. Zierra felt that the story finally had closure. He cut an ending that he was satisfied with and completed the documentary. From start to finish, My Big Break took 15 years to finish.

== Portrayal of drug use ==
My Big Break includes scenes of drug use as the aspiring actors and filmmaker get caught up in the negative side of the Hollywood lifestyle. The film deglamorizes what is euphemistically referred to as "partying" by showing the destructive consequences that substance abuse has on the careers and personal lives of those who become famous. In the film, Professor Mark Schaller, author of "The Psychological Consequences of Fame", discusses how celebrities often turn to the excessive use of drugs and alcohol to "escape the fishbowl of Hollywood" when they feel overwhelmed by pressure and scrutiny. Zierra decided to directly address the problem of substance abuse in Hollywood after Heath Ledger, who had been his friend, died in 2008. My Big Break is dedicated to Ledger.

== My Big Break and American Beauty ==
When Zierra first began filming his roommate Wes Bentley, the young actor had recently screen tested for the coveted role of Ricky Fitts in American Beauty but hadn't yet heard if he got the part. In My Big Break, Bentley discusses the experience of screen testing and his hope that he will be cast in the movie. Once Bentley landed the part, Zierra filmed him going to the Los Angeles premiere of American Beauty before the actor had any idea how the film or his performance would be received. The filmmaker was given rare access by DreamWorks to film the premiere from the vantage point of the red carpet. Zierra subsequently filmed Bentley attending the film's premiere in Toronto as well as the media frenzy that surrounded Bentley after American Beauty became a critically acclaimed hit. My Big Break then follows Bentley through his fast rise to fame and his misgivings about the pressures of the film industry. The final cut of My Big Break incorporates Bentley's admissions to the press, a decade after American Beauty, that he became a heroin addict after his initial success and how his career is now getting back on track.

== Screenings ==
The 2008 cut of My Big Break screened on September 26, 2008, at EYECON (the Supernatural convention) in Florida. Other pre-2011 cuts have screened at George Washington University, Bryn Mawr College, Bennington College, The Popular Culture/American Culture Conference, Artsfest Film Festival, The American Cinematic Experience Festival, the Boston Film Festival and Raindance Film Festival in London.

== Reception ==
My Big Break has received strong support and glowing reviews from its fans and in the blogosphere. The film won Best Documentary at the Boston Film Festival and Best Documentary at the Artsfest Film Festival 2009. It was also an official selection of The American Cinematic Experience Festival (Acefest) 2009, and Raindance Film Festival 2009 where it was nominated for Best Documentary.

== Multiple versions ==
In order to build a buzz and test audience reaction an early cut of My Big Break was given an extremely limited release on DVD in 2008. This longer version is no longer available and did not include Wes Bentley's admission that he had been struggling with drug addiction. In 2009 a tightened cut of the documentary was shown at festivals, universities and conferences but was not made available to a wider audience. The final cut of My Big Break released, in 2011, deals directly with issues of substance abuse. It also includes a text update of what the main subjects of the documentary are doing as of the release.

=== Awards ===
- Best Documentary (Artsfest 2009)
- Best Documentary (The Boston Film Festival 2009)

The film was also nominated for Best Documentary at the Raindance Film Festival in London.
