= Brad Rowe (actor) =

American actor

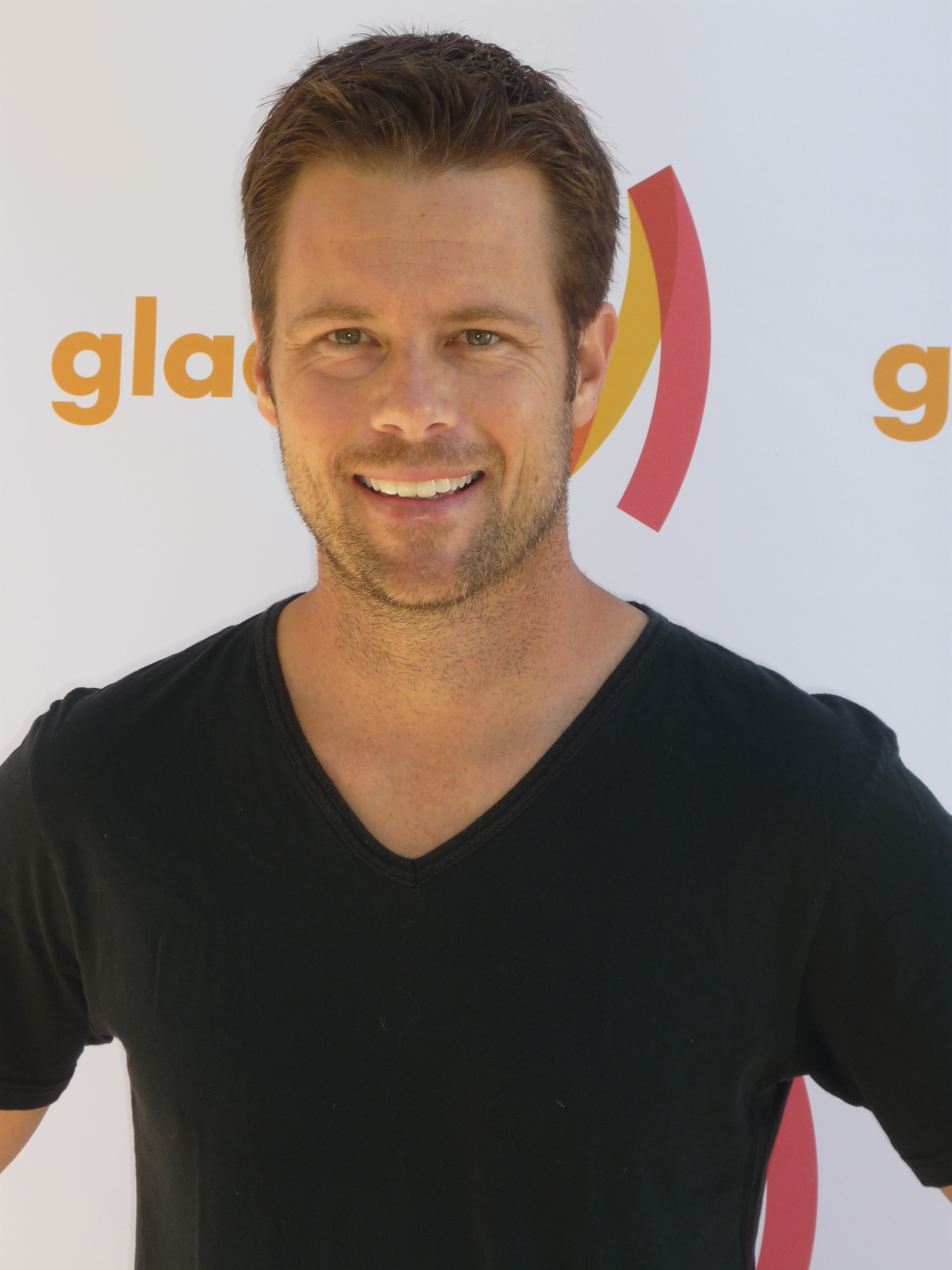
- Rowe in 2010
- Born: May 15, 1970 (age 56); Wauwatosa, Milwaukee County, Wisconsin, U.S.
- Occupations: Actor, activist
- Years active: 1996–present
- Spouse: Lisa Fiori (m. 1999)
- Children: 1

Bradley Thomas Rowe (born May 15, 1970) is an American actor, writer, producer, and public policy advocate. He appeared in Billy's Hollywood Screen Kiss (1998) and TNT's Purgatory. Other roles include a short stint as recurring character Walt on NewsRadio, Murphy Sinclair on General Hospital, Ty Swindle on Wasteland, and Dan Murphy on Leap of Faith.

== Early life ==
Rowe was born and raised in Wauwatosa, Wisconsin.

He attended University of Wisconsin–Madison as Spanish major, and later worked as a finance manager for political campaigns in Washington, D.C., before moving to Los Angeles, California, to pursue acting and screenwriting.

== Career ==
=== Entertainment career ===
Rowe appeared in the TV movies Vanished, Lucky 7 and Though None Go with Me and the NBC mini-series The 70s, as well as appearing on Perception as FBI Agent Bobby Dalton, and as Agent Jack Burgess on 1-800-MISSING.

In 1998, he portrayed a recurring character named Walt in the sitcom NewsRadio. The character is the nephew of WNYX‘s eccentric billionaire owner Jimmy James.

In 2007, he played Shaun, the romantic interest of the central character (Trevor Wright) of Shelter.

He took part in Tony Zierra's 2011 documentary My Big Break, which follows the early careers of Rowe, Wes Bentley, Chad Lindberg and Greg Fawcett.

=== Public policy work ===
Rowe advocated for same-sex marriage rights during the California Proposition 8 campaign in 2008.

In the early 2010s, Rowe worked in educational policy for the United Way of Greater Los Angeles, organizing HomeWalk, an event that raised money to fight homelessness.

Rowe graduated with a master's degree in public policy (MPP) from the UCLA Luskin School of Public Affairs in 2013. He was awarded the Ann C. Rosenfield Fellowship in Education Policy by the United Way of Greater Los Angeles.

Until 2017, Rowe was the managing director of BOTEC Analysis, a public policy research and consulting firm based in Los Angeles, and a contributor to the Crime and Justice Program at New York University's Marron Institute of Urban Management.

Rowe is president of Rowe Policy Media, specialising in cannabis and criminal justice policy. His book Cannabis Policy in the Age of Legalization was published in 2024.

== Personal life ==
Rowe and Lisa Fiori were married in 1999. They have a son named Hopper.

== Filmography ==
=== Film ===
Year	Title	Role	Notes
1998	Billy's Hollywood Screen Kiss	Gabriel	
1998	The Pandora Project	Lieutenant Tim Lacy	
1999	Body Shots	Shawn Denigan	
1999	Stonebrook	Erik	
1999	Purgatory	Leo 'Sonny' Dillard	(TV Movie)
2000	Christina's House	Howie Rhodes	
2000	The '70s	Byron Shales	(TV Movie)
2001	According to Spencer	Craig	
2001	Feather Pimento	Detective Murphy	(Short)
2001	Nailed	Jeff Romano	starred Harvey Keitel
2002	Would I Lie to You?	Paul	Direct-to-Video film
2002	Full Frontal	Sam Osborne	
2003	Certainly Not a Fairytale	Ken Doll #1	(Short, by Vivi Friedman)
2003	Fish Without a Bicycle	Danny	
2003	Lucky 7	Daniel McCandles	(TV Movie)
2003	October		(Short)
2003	The Uninvited	Gabriel	(Short)
2003	Getting Hal	Hal	
2004	Jessica	Mike	(Short)
2004	Shut Up and Kiss Me	Pete Waddle	
2005	Four Corners of Suburbia	Doug Lathrop	winner of both the Crossroads Film Festival in Best Narrative Feature (2006)
2005	Love for Rent	Jesse	
2005	Nadine in Date Land	Adam	(TV Movie)
2005	Mystery Woman: Sing Me a Murder	Jason	(TV Movie for Hallmark Channel)
2006	Last Day	Tyso	(Short)
2006	The Insatiable	Ronnie Klein	
2006	Vanished	Jake	(TV Movie)
2006	Though None Go with Me	Young Ben Phillips	(TV Movie for Hallmark Channel)
2007	National Treasure: Book of Secrets	Agent Hopper	
2007	Shelter	Shaun	winner of "Outstanding Film – Limited Release" at the 2009 GLAAD Media Awards
2011	A Christmas Wedding Tail	Jake	(TV Movie, Hallmark Channel movie)
2011	Carnal Innocence	Murphy Sinclair	(TV Movie)
2011	A Valentine's Date	Dylan Connors	(TV Movie)
2012	The Knightswood	Dad - White Knight	(Short)
2013	All I Want for Christmas	Robert	(TV Movie)
2013	The Contractor	Paul Chase	

=== Television ===
Year	Title	Role	Notes
1997	Clueless	Brian	1 Episode
1997	Pensacola: Wings of Gold	Zack Rossler	2 Episodes
1998	Pacific Blue	Kyle Cavanaugh	1 Episode
1998	NewsRadio	Walt	4 Episodes
1999	Wasteland	Tyler 'Ty' Swindell	13 Episodes
2000	The Wild Thornberrys	Big Ibex (voice)	1 Episode
2001	The Outer Limits	Daniel	1 Episode
1999	Wasteland	Tyler 'Ty' Swindell	13 Episodes
2002	Leap of Faith	Dan Murphy	6 Episodes
2003	Miss Match	Dave Hillman	1 Episode
2003–2006	Missing	Jack Burgess / Agent Jack Burgess	5 Episodes
2005	The Bad Girl's Guide	Dirk Flederhosen	1 Episode
2005	The Closer	Dean Kingsley	1 Episode
2005	CSI: Crime Scene Investigation	Mark Kyman	1 Episode
2006–2008	Happy Hour	Ross	2 Episodes
2006	CSI: Miami	Stephen Rowe	1 Episode
2006	Criminal Minds	Tony Canardo	1 Episode
2007	CSI: NY	Benjamin Sutor	1 Episode
2007	Tell Me You Love Me	Doctor	3 Episodes
2007	How I Met Your Mother	George	1 Episode
2007	Drive	Richard Patrakas	1 Episode
2007	Ghost Whisperer	Hugh Bristow	1 Episode
2008	IQ-145	Jake Berringer	10 Episodes
2008	The Mentalist	Det. Marco Francis	1 Episode
2008	Cold Case	Cyrus Brill '08	1 Episode
2009	Make It or Break It	Joe	1 Episode
2010	Freckle and Bean	Devin	1 Episode
2010	General Hospital	Murphy Sinclair	11 Episodes
2013–2014	Perception	FBI Agent Bobby Dalton	6 Episode
2018	Gods of Medicine	Terrance Edwards	1 Episode
