= Blue Rodeo (film) =

1996 American television film

- Genre: Drama; Romance
- Based on: Blue Rodeo by Jo-Ann Mapson
- Written by: Paul Lussier
- Directed by: Peter Werner
- Starring: Ann-Margret; Kris Kristofferson; Corbin Allred; Jude Herrera; Jimmy F. Skaggs
- Music by: Laura Karpman
- Country of origin: United States
- Original language: English

Production
- Executive producer: Paul A. Lussier
- Producers: Peter Werner; Billy Campbell; Sunta Izzicupo; Madeline Peerce; Joan Yee
- Production locations: Tucson, Arizona; San Rafael Ranch State Park
- Cinematography: Shelly Johnson
- Editor: Martin Nicholson
- Running time: 120 minutes
- Production companies: Lakeside Productions; Warner Bros. Television; The Paul Lussier Company

Original release
- Network: CBS
- Release: October 20, 1996

Blue Rodeo is a made for television drama film adapted from the novel of the same name by Jo-Ann Mapson. It first aired on CBS on October 20, 1996. Blue Rodeo was directed by Peter Werner and stars globally recognized artists, Ann-Margret and Kris Kristofferson.

== Plot ==
Margaret Yearwood moves to Blue Dog, New Mexico, to be near her teenage son who has gone deaf from a tragic accident which she feels responsible for. There, she unexpectedly falls in love with a mysterious cowboy and learns - along with her son - how to heal family bonds.

== Production ==
Filming took place in Arizona, U.S.A.

== Cast ==
Actor	Role
Ann-Margret	Maggie Yearwood
Kris Kristofferson	Owen Whister
Corbin Allred	Peter Yearwood
Jude Herrera	Bonnie Tsotsie
Jimmy F. Skaggs	Joe Yazzie
Martha Chavez	Lucy Hidalgo
Francisco Madrid	Leo Hidalgo
Aubrey Kramer	Bonnie's Friend
Melissa Gray	Waitress
Sidora Dazi	Flamenco Dancer
Adelita Ortiz	Bonnie's Friend and Vocalist of the theme song to "Blue Rodeo"
Tracy Ellisor	Mr. Yearwood
Chris Howell	Karl Ranklin
