= Filmworker =

2017 film directed by Tony Zierra

- Directed by: Tony Zierra
- Produced by: Elizabeth Yoffe; Tony Zierra
- Starring: Leon Vitali
- Edited by: Tony Zierra
- Release date: 2017
- Running time: 94 minutes
- Country: United States
- Language: English

Filmworker is a 2017 American documentary film directed by Tony Zierra about Leon Vitali, a successful British actor who, after playing the role of Lord Bullingdon in the Stanley Kubrick-directed Barry Lyndon, gave up his acting career to work for decades as Kubrick’s assistant. Filmworker premiered at the 2017 Cannes Film Festival on May 19 and was nominated for the L'Œil d'or, le prix du documentaire – Cannes.

== Synopsis ==
After his performance as "Lord Bullingdon" in Stanley Kubrick’s Barry Lyndon, actor Leon Vitali gave up his career to become Kubrick’s personal assistant. For more than two decades Vitali played a crucial role behind-the-scenes helping Kubrick make and maintain his body of work. In Filmworker, Vitali’s experiences with Kubrick are brought together with previously unseen photos, videos, letters, notebooks and memos from his private collection. Interviews with actors, family, crew members and key film industry professionals who worked with Kubrick and Vitali are also utilized throughout the film.

== Production ==
Director Tony Zierra was working on another Kubrick related project when he met Leon Vitali. After extensively interviewing Vitali, Zierra and his producing partner, Elizabeth Yoffe, decided that his story should be told and began shooting what would become Filmworker. The film took three years to complete and was shot in California, New York, Kentucky, UK and Sweden.

== Participants ==
Filmworker features interviews with actors and film industry professionals who worked with, or knew, Kubrick and/or Leon Vitali, as well as members of Vitali's family. Participants include actors Ryan O'Neal (Barry Lyndon in Barry Lyndon), Danny Lloyd (Danny Torrance in The Shining), Matthew Modine (Private Joker in Full Metal Jacket), Lee Ermey (Gunnery Sgt. Hartman in Full Metal Jacket), Marie Richardson (Marion in Eyes Wide Shut), Stellan Skarsgård, Pernilla August, Brian Capron and Treva Etienne (Morgue Orderly in Eyes Wide Shut). Film industry professionals featured in Filmworker include former and current Warner Bros. executives Julian Senior, Brian Jamieson, Warren Lieberfarb, Steve Southgate and Ned Price.

== Reception ==
Filmworker was given a long standing ovation after its premiere at Cannes. Following Cannes, the press and critical reviews were favorable. On review aggregator website Rotten Tomatoes, the film holds an approval rating of 95%, based on 86 reviews, and an average rating of 7.7/10. On Metacritic, the film has a weighted average score of 73 out of 100, based on 19 critics, indicating "generally favorable" reviews.

Owen Gleiberman of Variety gave Filmworker a positive review and wrote that it is the best of the Kubrick-themed documentaries. Gwilym Mumford wrote in The Guardian that Filmworker is "A revealing and stirring celebration of one of cinema’s unacknowledged heroes." Bilge Ebiri of Village Voice put Filmworker on his list of top 12 best movies at Cannes 2017. Ann Hornaday in The Washington Post called Filmworker "movie love at its purest" and said that "Vitali’s story marked an incursion of the real world into Cannes in the very best sense, as a celebration of its anonymous inhabitants’ role in bringing our collective dreams to life."

== Director's cut ==
Leon Vitali died on 19 August 2022 in Los Angeles. The Associated Press story about Vitali's death, states that Tony Zierra "is working on a director’s cut of Filmworker that will include new footage that he and Vitali wanted in the film, but couldn’t get done in time for its Cannes debut in 2017." The director's cut of Filmworker premiered on July 19, 2025 at Low Cinema in Ridgewood, New York as part of a week long run of "The Film Work Of Tony Zierra"
