= Jessica Szohr =

American actress

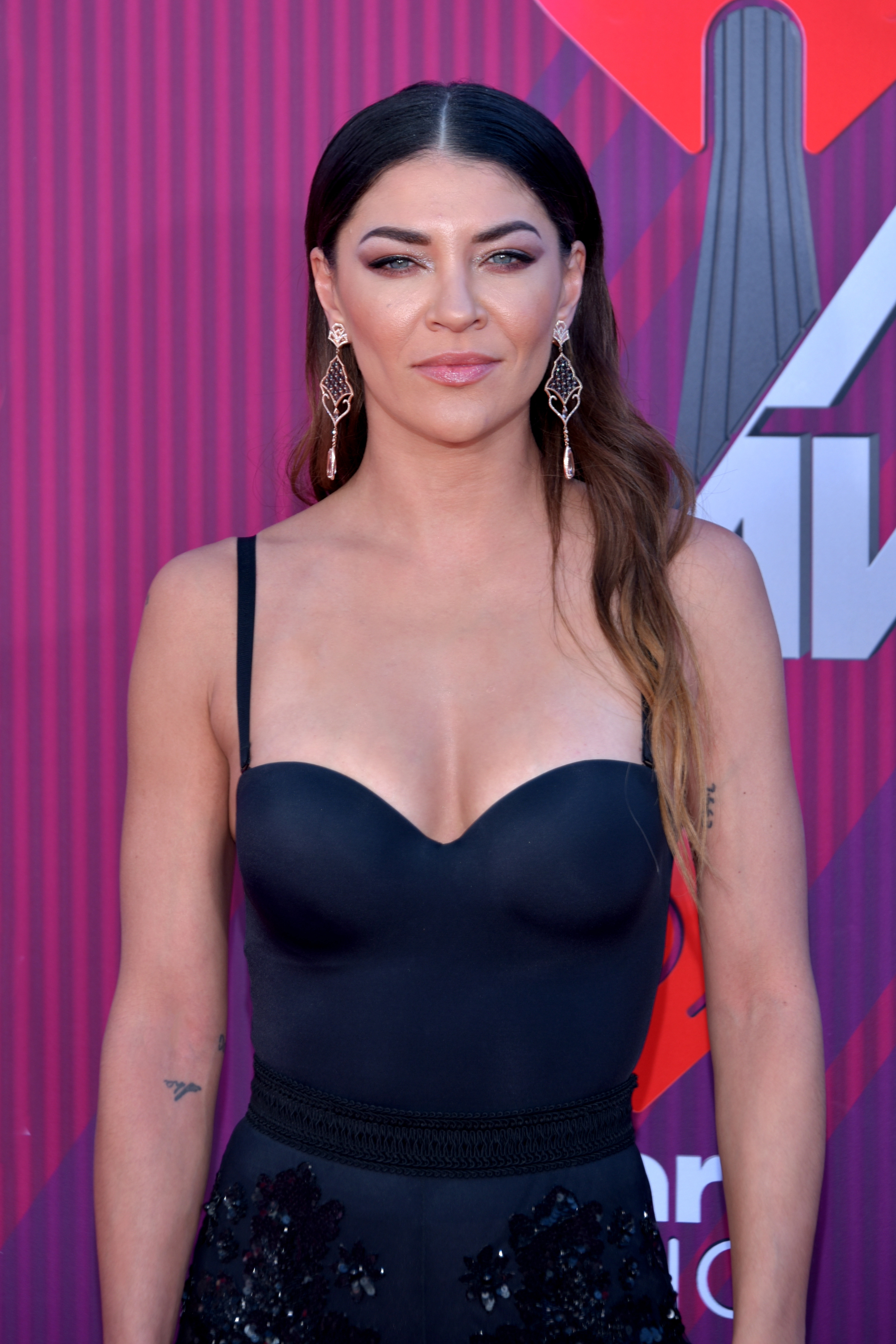
- Szohr in 2019
- Born: March 31, 1985 (age 41); Menomonee Falls, Wisconsin, U.S.
- Occupation: Actress
- Years active: 2003–present
- Spouse: Brad Richardson (m. 2024)
- Children: 1

Jessica Szohr (/ˈzɔːr/; born March 31, 1985) is an American actress. She started her screen career appearing on television shows such as My Wife and Kids (2003), Joan of Arcadia (2004), What About Brian (2007) and CSI: Miami (2007). She gained recognition in 2007 with her breakthrough role as Vanessa Abrams on The CW's teen drama series Gossip Girl (2007–2012). She has appeared in feature films including the horror film Piranha 3D (2010), the comedy film I Don't Know How She Does It (2011), the comedy film The Internship (2013) and the comedy film Ted 2 (2015). Her recent television credits include Complications (2015), Kingdom (2015), Twin Peaks (2017) and Shameless (2017–18). During 2018–2019, she was a main cast member of the Fox/Hulu science fiction series The Orville, as Talla Keyali.

== Early life ==
Szohr was born in Menomonee Falls, Wisconsin. She is of Hungarian and one-quarter African-American descent, and the oldest of five children (Megan, Danielle, Nick, and Sadie). She started a cleaning company with a friend, cleaning their teachers' houses.

Szohr started modeling as a child. She appeared in print ads for Kohl's department store. Subsequent modeling gigs followed, including prints for Crate & Barrel, Mountain Dew, Sears, Jockey and JanSport. Szohr graduated from Menomonee Falls High School a semester early and moved to Los Angeles with her mother at the age of 17 to pursue an acting career. She told Seventeen magazine that she "almost moved home like five times." She initially aspired to become an interior designer and had enrolled in Columbia College Chicago, but her agent ultimately convinced her to try pilot season auditions.

== Career ==
Szohr made her debut as an actress in 2003 in an episode of the third season of My Wife and Kids, titled "Not So Hostile Takeover". Her first film was Uncle Nino (2003), playing a minor role as The MC. She appeared in numerous guest roles in teen television series such as That's So Raven, Drake & Josh, What I Like About You, and Joan of Arcadia. She also appeared in three episodes of CSI: Miami as Samantha Barrish.

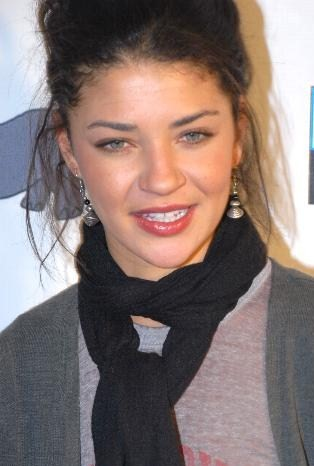
Szohr in 2007

In 2007, she appeared in a major recurring role as Laura for six episodes in the ABC dramedy series What About Brian. Along with Stacy Keibler, she played a neighbor to the leading role, Brian O'Hara (Barry Watson). She also appeared in the music videos for "Best Days" by Matt White and "Over You" by Daughtry, in which she played Sarah.

In the same year, Szohr earned her breakthrough role on the hit CW teen drama series Gossip Girl. She plays Vanessa Abrams. Szohr said of her character: "Vanessa doesn't change for other people. She says what she thinks. [...] she's just a badass girl from Brooklyn". The portrayal of Vanessa has drawn criticism from Cecily von Ziegesar, author of the original Gossip Girl novels. Originally cast as a recurring role, Szohr was promoted to series regular after the season one episode "The Blair Bitch Project" in April 2008. In May 2011, it was confirmed Szohr would not be returning for the fifth season. She returned in for a cameo appearance on the series finale, "New York, I Love You XOXO", on December 17, 2012.

Szohr has appeared in small roles in films such as Somebody Help Me, The Reading Room and Fired Up. She signed on to Dimension Films' horror Piranha 3D, in the role of Kelly. The role required her to be underwater; Szohr later told the New York Daily News filming was difficult because she was "not the best swimmer." Filming began in June 2009, and the film was pushed back from its original release date in March to August 2010. She also appeared in a Funny or Die video promoting the film alongside Kelly Brook and others.

Szohr was awarded the Breakthrough Actress in Film award at the 2010 Breakthrough of the Year awards for her work in Piranha 3D.

In April 2010, Szohr joined the cast of the romantic comedy Love, Wedding, Marriage, along with Mandy Moore and Kellan Lutz. The film began principal photography in April 2010 and was filmed in New Orleans. That same year, Szohr was included on People magazine's "100 Most Beautiful People in the World" list.

Szohr has a role in the 2012 independent post-apocalyptic sci-fi film Hirokin. Her role as Orange has been described as a "cunning temptress".

Szohr starred in the 2012 indie drama Art Machine as an outlaw hipster and a pyrotechnic artist. In October 2011, she finished filming a horror comedy film in East Lothian, Scotland titled Love Bite with co-star Ed Speleers. In November 2011, Szohr filmed the drama Light Years in Los Angeles.

In 2012, Szohr helped Hayden Panettiere punk Glee actress Dianna Agron.

Szohr appeared in Taylor Swift's 2013 music video for the song "22". In March 2013, she was cast as the female lead in the Fox drama pilot The List, playing FBI agent Natalie Voss. However, it was reported on May 8, 2013, that Fox had passed on the pilot. In November 2013, Szohr was cast as Gretchen in USA Network's medical drama pilot Complications.

In June 2015, Szohr was set as a recurring on the upcoming second season of DirecTV’s MMA drama Kingdom. Szohr will play Laura Melvin, an artist/photographer who has "read everything, been everywhere," and immediately intrigued by Jay (Jonathan Tucker) whom she wants to hire for a photo shoot.

On February 12, 2018, Szohr was cast as a regular for the second season of the science fiction comedy-drama series The Orville, as Talla Keyali.

On January 26, 2022, Szohr launched the podcast XOXO with Jessica Szohr, a walk down memory lane with the cast and crew of Gossip Girl featuring behind-the scenes stories, on-set memories, and more with interviews and occasional episode rewatches.

== Personal life ==
Szohr enjoys snowboarding, hiking, yoga, and football. She describes her hobbies as a result of her being from Wisconsin. She also is a Green Bay Packers fan.

Szohr's partner is former NHL ice hockey player Brad Richardson. Szohr gave birth to their daughter on January 11, 2021. The two got engaged in May 2022, and married in August 2024.

== Filmography ==
=== Film ===
Year	Title	Role	Notes
2003	Uncle Nino	The MC	
2007	Somebody Help Me	Nicole	
2009	Fired Up!	Kara	
2010	Piranha 3D	Kelly Driscoll	
2011	Love, Wedding, Marriage	Shelby	
2011	I Don't Know How She Does It	Paula	
2011	Tower Heist	Sasha Gibbs	
2012	Hirokin	Orange	
2012	Art Machine	Cassandra Moon	
2012	Love Bite	Juliana	
2013	Pawn	Bonnie	
2013	The Internship	Marielena	
2013	Brightest Star	Lita Markovic	
2014	House at the End of the Drive	Krista	
2014	10 Cent Pistol	Chelsea	
2014	Two Night Stand	Faiza	
2015	Club Life	Tanya	
2015	Ted 2	Allison	
–	All-Star Weekend †	Abby	Completed 2019, unreleased
2020	Clover	Angie	

=== Television ===
Year	Title	Role	Notes
2003	My Wife and Kids	Dee-Jay	Episode: "Not So Hostile Takeover"
2004	What I Like About You	Liz	Episode: "Lunar Eclipse of the Heart"
2004	Drake & Josh		Episode: "Two Idiots and a Baby"
2004	Joan of Arcadia	Nikki	Episode: "Double Dutch"
2005	That's So Raven	Jordache Hilltopper	Episode: "The Big Buzz"
2005	The Reading Room	Dayva	Television film
2007	What About Brian	Laura	6 episodes
2007	CSI: Miami	Samantha Barrish	3 episodes
2007–2012	Gossip Girl	Vanessa Abrams	Recurring cast (season 1); main role (seasons 1–4); uncredited (season 6)
2007	Somebody Help Me	Nicole	Television film
2010	The City	Herself	Episode: "The Belle of Elle"
2012	Punk'd	Herself	Episode: "Hayden Panettiere"
2013	Men at Work	Jenny	Episode: "Long Distance Tyler"
2014	Lucky in Love	Mira Simon	Television film
2015	Complications	Gretchen Polk	Main role
2015	Kingdom	Laura Melvin	5 episodes
2015	CSI: Cyber	Carmen Lopez / Blaze / Det. April Castilla	Episode: "Gone in 6 Seconds"
2017	Twin Peaks	Renee	3 episodes
2017–2018	Shameless	Nessa Chabon	11 episodes
2019–2022	The Orville	Talla Keyali	Main cast (seasons 2–3)
2022	Designing Christmas	Stella	TV Movie

=== Music videos ===
Year	Title	Artist(s)	Role
2007	"Best Days"	Matt White	
2007	"Over You"	Daughtry	Sarah
2011	"Sunday"	Hurts	Eurydice
2013	"22"	Taylor Swift	Swift's best friend
2014	"Already Home"	A Great Big World	
2016	"Where's the Love?"	The Black Eyed Peas featuring The World	Cameo

== Awards and nominations ==
Year	Award	Category	Workstation	Result
2011	MTV Movie Award	Best Scared-As-S**t Performance	Piranha 3D	Nominated
