= Hirokin =

2012 American independent action-adventure film

- Directed by: Alejo Mo-Sun
- Written by: Alejo Mo-Sun
- Starring: Wes Bentley; Jessica Szohr; Angus Macfadyen; Laura Ramsey; Julian Sands; Mercedes Manning
- Cinematography: Cameron Duncan
- Music by: John Paesano
- Production company: Mo-Sun Welteroth Media
- Release date: 2012
- Running time: 105 minutes
- Country: United States
- Language: English

Hirokin: The Last Samurai (released as "Fallen Empire" in European markets) is an independent American action-adventure film released in 2012. The film is directed by writer/director Alejo Mo-Sun and produced by Mo-Sun Welteroth Media. It stars Wes Bentley, Jessica Szohr, Angus Macfadyen, and Julian Sands.

== Synopsis ==
The film tells the story of Hirokin, a samurai on a post-apocalyptic planet. After his family is murdered by the evil dictator Griffin, the reluctant warrior, left for dead in the desert, vows to avenge his loved ones and to defend his people.

== Cast ==
- Wes Bentley as Hirokin
- Jessica Szohr as Orange
- Angus Macfadyen as Moss
- Laura Ramsey as Maren
- Julian Sands as Griffin
- Mercedes Manning as Terra

== Reception ==
Paul Chambers of MovieChambers.com gave the film an F grade and wrote: "This direct-to-video nightmare will have you hitting the eject button faster than light speed".
