= Purgatory (1999 film) =

1999 film

- Release poster
- Genre: Western; Fantasy
- Written by: Gordon T. Dawson
- Directed by: Uli Edel
- Starring: Sam Shepard; Eric Roberts; Peter Stormare; Brad Rowe; Donnie Wahlberg; JD Souther; Amelia Heinle; Randy Quaid
- Music by: Brad Fiedel
- Country of origin: United States
- Original language: English

Production
- Executive producer: David A. Rosemont
- Producer: Daniel Schneider
- Cinematography: William Wages
- Editor: Mark Conte
- Running time: 94 minutes
- Production company: Rosemont Productions

Original release
- Network: TNT
- Release: January 10, 1999

Purgatory, also known as Purgatory West of the Pecos, is a 1999 American Western fantasy television film directed by Uli Edel. The film premiered on TNT on January 10, 1999. It focuses on a gang of outlaws who find their way to a hidden valley and a peaceful town, where residents shun swearing, alcohol, guns and any kind of violence but resemble dead Western heroes. The outcome is marked by its exploration of the interface between legend-making and humanitarian values.

== Plot ==
A violent outlaw band led by Blackjack Britton and Cavin Guthrie robs a bank. During the subsequent gunfight, a prostitute named Dolly Sloan is shot and dies in the arms of youngest gang member and Cavin's nephew Sonny. The gang flees, pursued by a posse and manages to escape through a dust storm by following a tunnel into a green valley. The town of Refuge welcomes them but they are puzzled by the residents, who do not carry guns or swear and who flock to the church whenever the bell tolls.

Sonny thinks he recognizes some of the townspeople from the dime novels he reads. He befriends a woman named Rose, who deflects his questions and asks some pointed ones of her own, beginning with "How many men have you killed?" The rest of the outlaws occupy the saloon and begin causing trouble. One of the gang members is struck by lightning when he prepares to throw his knife at the church door. His body is carried away by a Native American, who guards the gates to a mist-filled property outside of town.

As Sonny investigates further, he realizes that the town appears to be occupied by former notorious gunfighters. These include Wild Bill Hickok, the town's sheriff; Jesse James; Billy the Kid; and Doc Holliday, although they deny their identities to Sonny. Later, he talks to a gardener named Lamb whom he prompts to admit who he really is. Before Sonny can ask more questions, some of Blackjack's men tear up Lamb's garden. Enraged, he beats one to death with his shovel and is led away by the mysterious Gatekeeper.

While talking to Doc, Sonny lets slip the true nature of their gang and Sheriff Forrest asks them to saddle up and leave town. Blackjack orders all his men to assemble in the saloon except Sonny, who is ejected, but steals back and overhears the gang planning to rob the town on their way out, while Cavin plans to rape Rose. Sonny joins the townspeople in church, where he begs them to defend themselves. They finally admit to Sonny that Refuge is a form of Purgatory. If they can go 10 years while resisting the temptations of their former lives, they are admitted to Heaven. They are, therefore, reluctant to face off against Blackjack's gang because it will cost them their respite. A frustrated Sonny leaves the church and is jumped by Blackjack and Cavin, who beat him unconscious.

The next morning, a battered Sonny straps on his guns and prepares to face Blackjack's gang alone. The townspeople are summoned by the church bell, but while most of them comply, Hickok, Holliday, James and Billy all join Sonny, inspired by his willingness to die to protect Rose. A shootout erupts, during which Blackjack's gang are all slaughtered but Cavin manages to shoot Sonny before being killed by him in return. Sonny, despite being fatally wounded, does not feel pain and does not die. Hickok welcomes him to Refuge, realizing that Sonny has earned his second chance. When Blackjack arrives and challenges Hickok, he loses. "I guess I'm one of you now," Blackjack jokes, realizing the truth of the situation. "I wouldn't count on it," Hickok replies before finally dispatching his opponent.

The Gatekeeper carries the bodies of Cavin and Blackjack beyond the misty gates to the edge of a fiery pit, into which they are thrown screaming. Hickok and the others grimly follow but the stagecoach arrives and the driver tells them that by their willingness to sacrifice their chance of a better future to protect the others, they have secured a place in Heaven. "The Creator may be tough, but He ain't blind," he says. Sonny asks to stay behind with Rose and Hickok hands him the sheriff's badge. The coach then leaves, riding upwards into the light.

== Cast ==
- Sam Shepard as Sheriff Forrest / "Wild Bill" Hickok
- Eric Roberts as Jack "Blackjack" Britton
- Randy Quaid as Doc Woods / "Doc" Holliday
- Peter Stormare as Cavin Guthrie
- Brad Rowe as Leon "Sonny" Dillard
- Donnie Wahlberg as Deputy Glen / Billy "The Kid"
- JD Souther as Brooks / Jesse James
- Amelia Heinle as Rose / Betty McCullough
- Shannon Kenny as Ivy / Dolly Sloan
- John Dennis Johnston as Lamb / Jack "Lefty" Slade
- Saginaw Grant as The Gatekeeper
- R.G. Armstrong as The Stagecoach Driver
- Richard Edson as Euripides
- Gregory Scott Cummins as Knox
- John Diehl as "Badger" Britton
- Michael Shaner as Jacinto
- Les Lannom as The Bartender

== Production ==
Writer Gordon Dawson had worked on several Westerns previously and was inspired to write a religious morality tale set in an Old West town inhabited by ghosts. The film was shot on the backlot of Warner Bros. Studios Burbank during the summer of 1998 on 35mm. Director Uli Edel had always wanted to direct a Western but was aware of the genre's dwindling popularity with the major Hollywood film studios in the late 1990s, as were Purgatory's producers. Edel's involvement in directing, though, convinced Sam Shepard to agree to star, feeling that as a European, Edel would bring different ideas to the film. Shepard described the filming as difficult because of the short shooting schedule available. Brad Fiedel had worked with Uli Edel previously and the two agreed that the film's music should "support the classic Western elements of the project and not overplay the otherworldly elements, so that the audience could enjoy discovering the strangeness of what was really going on in this seemingly normal town without the score telegraphing it too much".

== Reception ==
Purgatory was first aired on TNT on January 10, 1999. The movie was advertised and marketed as "Not your ordinary damn Western". Variety gave the film a positive review, praising the story and Sam Shepard's performance in particular. Anita Gates of The New York Times was also enthusiastic about this "fascinating, deceptively dark Western with more than a touch of The Twilight Zone,'' observing, "Gordon Dawson's script makes the process satisfying despite the fact that any viewer who has noticed the title of the film knows the answer from the beginning." When it was shown in Britain, Radio Times described the film as "a barmy but richly enjoyable Western fable".

Hugh H. Davis later provided a chapter examining Purgatory's surreal and religious themes in the compilation Undead in the West. This is a wry meditation on the changes rung on legend in the film, where the heroes portrayed had already been immortalized by reputation while still alive; now they are "dead" they must earn their immortal redemption by giving up everything that had earned them their reputations in the first place. Parallels are also drawn between the dime novels that contributed to the making of the Western legends, of which Sonny Dillard (Brad Rowe) is an avid reader, and the celluloid embroidering of the same legends. High Noon in particular, the prototype of the climactic final shootout, had gone through many variations in later films, and references to several of these exist in Purgatory but informing everything else there is Dante Alighieri's Purgatorio, the theology of which permeates Edel's film, according to Davis.
