= Room 237 =

2012 film

- Theatrical release poster
- Directed by: Rodney Ascher
- Produced by: Tim Kirk
- Starring: Bill Blakemore; Geoffrey Cocks; Juli Kearns; John Fell Ryan; Jay Weidner
- Edited by: Rodney Ascher
- Music by: Jonathan Snipes; William Hutson; The Caretaker; Film music: Wendy Carlos; Rachel Elkind
- Distributed by: IFC Films; IFC Midnight
- Release date: January 23, 2012 (Sundance)
- Running time: 102 minutes
- Country: United States
- Language: English
- Budget: $5,426
- Box office: $367,406

Room 237 is a 2012 American documentary film directed by Rodney Ascher about interpretations of Stanley Kubrick's film The Shining (1980) which was adapted from the 1977 novel of the same name by Stephen King. The documentary includes footage from The Shining and other Kubrick films, along with discussions by Kubrick enthusiasts. Room 237 has nine segments, each focusing on a different element within The Shining which "may reveal hidden clues and hint at a bigger thematic oeuvre." Produced by Tim Kirk, the documentary's title refers to a room in the haunted Overlook Hotel featured in The Shining.

Room 237 was screened in the Directors' Fortnight section at the 2012 Cannes and Sundance film festivals. Its distribution rights were acquired by IFC Midnight and was exhibited theatrically and on VOD on March 29, 2013.

== Overview ==
Though King's novel and Kubrick's film adaptation depart in some significant details, they share the same premise. Jack Torrance, a would-be professional writer, takes on a job as the winter caretaker of the sprawling Overlook Hotel in the Colorado Rocky Mountains. His wife Wendy and son Danny accompany him for the season, the child exhibiting a psychic power called "the shining". Hotel chef Dick Hallorann also possesses psychic powers and offers advice to the youngster about managing his unusual abilities. As the months wear on, the isolated family suffers from cabin fever and begins to experience paranormal events.

Room 237 is told entirely through voice-overs by people with theories about The Shining. According to one, the film is about the cultural assimilation of Native Americans, because, according to the story, the hotel was built on a Native American burial mound; and there is imagery throughout the film associated with the American West. Cans of Calumet Baking Powder are noticeable in the background of two important scenes. Because a calumet is a ceremonial pipe, and the cans featured the image of a Native American, one analyst believed that American imperialism was the subtext of the film.

Another theorist believed that Kubrick had directed the footage disseminated by NASA to fake the Apollo 11 Moon landing. He believed that there are telltale signs of the use of front projection in NASA's footage and that Kubrick was contracted to produce hoaxed footage of a fake Moon landing. He points to the knitted Apollo 11 sweater that Danny wears and claims that "237" refers to the mean distance of the Earth to the Moon. He also refers to the fact that a carpet pattern resembles the Apollo launching pad as evidence that the film is an elaborate apology of sorts for Kubrick's involvement. The analyst feels that the tirade Jack delivers to Wendy about how she does not understand the duty of work and honoring a contract with an employer portrays Kubrick's own sense of isolation from keeping so big a secret.

One theorist connects the Overlook's hedge maze-labyrinth with the mythic story of the Minotaur, believing that a skier in a poster is actually a minotaur. She bolsters her theory by pointing out that there is no maze in the original book and that Kubrick's 1955 film Killer's Kiss, was made for Minotaur Productions.

Kubrick's unrealized project about the Holocaust, Aryan Papers, suggested to another critic that The Shining is really about that genocide. He connects Jack's sinister recitation of the Big Bad Wolf's refrain to a Disney production where the wolf is an anti-Semitic caricature. The analyst also feels that Kubrick embeds a message of hope in Dick's advice to Danny about how to deal with his shining abilities. Dick explains that the images Danny sees are just pictures of the past and they can be forgotten. The analyst feels Kubrick is trying to remind his audience of the Holocaust while at the same time helping them to let go of its horrors. There is an extended sequence where the film is superimposed over itself in reverse. By running the film forwards and backwards at the same time, parallels are created, such as Danny walking in on his father and the previous caretaker as they discuss Danny's murder.

The filmmakers do not attempt to promote the claims made by their interview subjects. Director Rodney Ascher offered his own interpretation in an interview for Complex:

My personal take on it is, for one, I don’t think it's nearly as visionary as any one of these folks have found. I just see it as sort of a story about juggling the responsibilities of your career and family and as cautionary tale of what may happen if you make the wrong choice. And even maybe looking at the ghosts as these figures that represent fortune or prestige or things that you might be chasing at the expense of paying proper attention to your family.

== Cast ==
The film features narration by Bill Blakemore, Geoffrey Cocks, Juli Kearns, John Fell Ryan and Jay Weidner. Buffy Visick appears as the VHS enthusiast.

The film also contains archival footage featuring Stanley Kubrick, Stephen King, Jack Nicholson, Shelley Duvall, Danny Lloyd, Scatman Crothers, Joe Turkel, Barry Nelson, Philip Stone, Barry Dennen, Keir Dullea, Martin Potter, Tom Cruise and Nicole Kidman.

== Critical reception ==
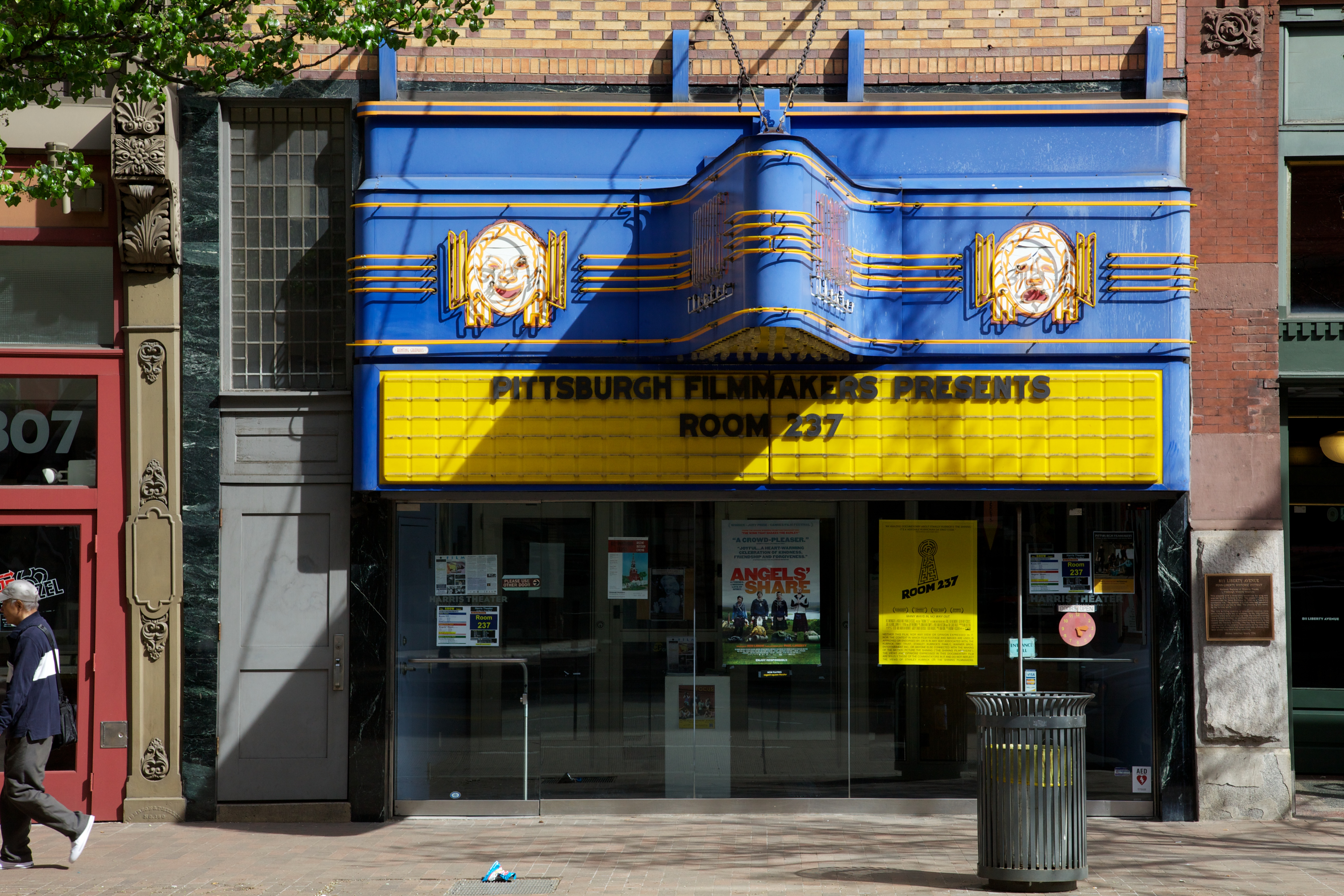
A showing at Harris Theater, presented by Pittsburgh Filmmakers.

Room 237 opened to general acclaim from critics. On the review aggregator website Rotten Tomatoes, the film holds an approval rating of 94% based on 133 reviews, with an average rating of 7.5/10. The website's critics consensus reads, "Mysterious and provocative, Room 237 is a fascinating journey into the world of obsessive cinephilles." Metacritic, which uses a weighted average, assigned the film a score of 80 out of 100, based on 30 critic reviews, indicating "generally favorable" reviews.

Manohla Dargis of The New York Times praised the film as "an ode to movie love at its most deliriously unfettered" and wrote "The doc positions The Shining as a comparably coiled, thematically overflowing microcosm—standing in for cinema, for history, for obsession, for postmodern theory buckling under the film's heft." Owen Gleiberman of Entertainment Weekly gave the film an "A", writing: "Room 237 makes perfect sense of The Shining because, even more than The Shining itself, it places you right inside the logic of how an insane person thinks." Another positive review came from Peter Travers of Rolling Stone, who rated the film 3.5 stars out of 4 and called the "unique and unforgettable film" a "tribute to movie love". Mary Pols of Time commented that the film was "as fresh, crisp and strangely exciting as a new dollar bill." She commented on the theories of the film: "Maybe they're all right. Or wrong. It can't be settled. What matters is that people are still crazy about the beauty of a beautiful movie about going crazy."

Jim Emerson, writing for RogerEbert.com, offered a mixed 2.5 stars out of a possible 4. He wrote that the documentary "isn't film criticism, it isn't coherent analysis, but listening to fanatics go on and on about their fixations can be kind of fun. For a while, at least."

In a March 27, 2013 article in The New York Times, Leon Vitali, who served as personal assistant to Kubrick on the film, stated, "There are ideas espoused in the movie that I know to be total balderdash". For example, the documentary's theory concerning a poster of a skier is in fact referencing a minotaur, while the film's usage of a German typewriter, interpreted to be symbolic of the Holocaust, was chosen by Kubrick for pragmatic reasons. He concluded that "[Kubrick] didn't tell an audience what to think or how to think and if everyone came out thinking something differently that was fine with him. That said, I'm certain that he wouldn't have wanted to listen to about 70, or maybe 80 percent [of Room 237]... Because it's pure gibberish."

In an October 2014 interview with Rolling Stone, Stephen King (who has been vocal in his dislike for Kubrick's adaptation of his novel) said that he had seen the film and that he "watched about half of it and got impatient with it and turned it off". According to King, he "never had much patience for academic bullshit"; several of the interpretations of The Shining come from academics and professors. King felt the film makers and theorists were "reaching for things that weren't there".
