= The Failures =

- Directed by: Tim Hunter
- Written by: Lou Berger
- Starring: Ashley Johnson
- Edited by: David MacCormack
- Music by: Julian Nott
- Production company: Yankee Films
- Distributed by: Werner Film
- Release dates: May 17, 2003 (Cannes Film Festival); October 14, 2004
- Running time: 95 minutes
- Country: United States
- Language: English
- Budget: $4-5 million

The Failures is a 2003 film directed by Tim Hunter. It stars Ashley Johnson and Chad Lindberg. It won three awards in 2003 and 2004.

== Cast ==
- Ashley Johnson as Lilly Kyle
- Chad Lindberg as William
- Seth Adkins as Sam Kyle
- Claudia Christian as Anna
- Henry Czerny as Frank Kyle
- Michael Ironside as Depressor
- Sasha Mitchell as Reflexor
- Jesse Plemons as Boe
