= Chad Lindberg =

American actor (born 1976)

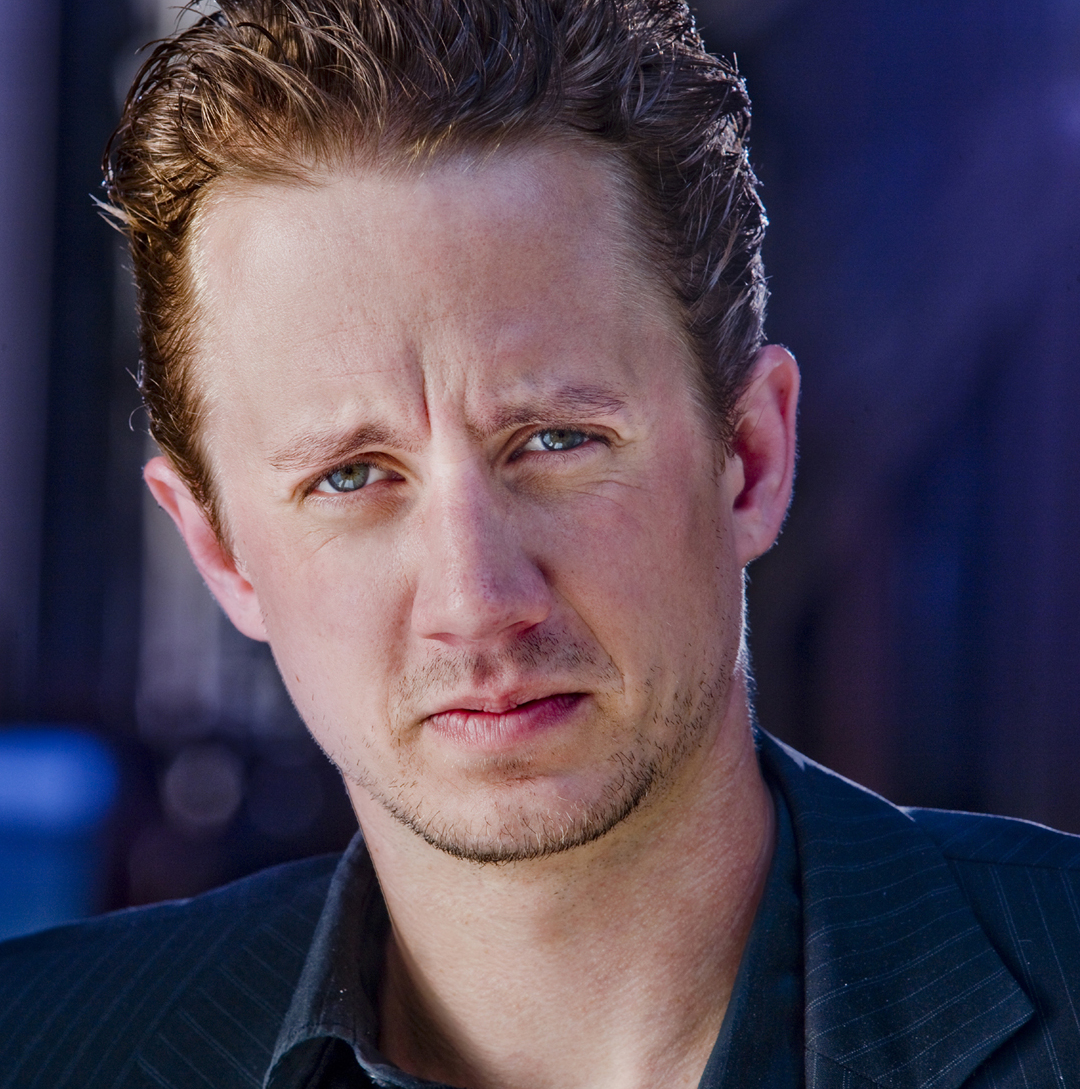
- Lindberg in 2008
- Born: Chad Tyler Lindberg; November 1, 1976 (age 49); Mount Vernon, Washington, U.S.
- Occupation: Actor
- Years active: 1985–present

Chad Tyler Lindberg (born November 1, 1976) is an American actor and producer. He is known for his film roles in The Fast and the Furious and October Sky, as well as television roles on Sons of Anarchy and Supernatural. Lindberg was also the co-host of the television series Ghost Stalkers.

== Life and career ==
Lindberg was born in Mount Vernon, Washington, the son of Luwana and Pete Lindberg. He attended Mount Vernon High School. He began his acting career as Rory in Black Circle Boys at the 1997 Sundance Film Festival. From there, he made several guest appearances on popular television shows, such as ER, Buffy the Vampire Slayer, and The X-Files. He continued pursuing films roles, particularly as Sherman O'Dell in October Sky and Jesse, a mechanic with ADD, in The Fast and the Furious.

He received attention for his role in I Spit on Your Grave, the 2010 remake of the '70s cult classic. He has also appeared in the recurring role of Chad Willingham on CSI: NY and as Ash on Supernatural. He took part in Tony Zierra's 2011 documentary My Big Break, which follows the early careers of Lindberg, Wes Bentley, Brad Rowe and Greg Fawcett. He was also a guest star in an episode of The Cape as Hicks, a professional sniper assassin. He was more recently featured as a paranormal investigator on the Destination America program Ghost Stalkers.

== Filmography ==
| Year | Title | Role | Notes |
|---|---|---|---|
| 1985 | The Twilight Zone | Grey Haired Boy | Episode: "The Beacon" |
| 1995 | Born to be Wild | Burger Boss | |
| 1997 | 413 Hope St. | Jonas | |
| 1997 | Buffy the Vampire Slayer | Dave | Episode: "I, Robot... You, Jane" |
| 1997 | ER | Jadd Houston | 2 episodes |
| 1997 | Black Circle Boys | Rory | |
| 1998 | The Velocity of Gary | Kid Joey | |
| 1998 | City of Angels | Balford's Son | |
| 1998 | Mercury Rising | James Halstrom | |
| 1998 | The X-Files | Bobby Rich | Episode: "Schizogeny" |
| 1999 | The White River Kid | Reggie Weed | |
| 1999 | October Sky | Sherman O'Dell | |
| 2000 | Brightness | Nick | |
| 2001 | The Fast and the Furious | Jesse | |
| 2001 | Undone | Paul | |
| 2002 | A Midsummer Night's Rave | Nick | |
| 2002 | The Rookie | Joe David West | |
| 2002 | The Flats | Harper | |
| 2003 | The Last Samurai | Winchester Rep Assistant | |
| 2003 | The Failures | William | |
| 2003 | Law & Order: Special Victims Unit | Eddie Cappilla | Episode: "Fallacy" |
| 2003 | CSI: Crime Scene Investigation | Brody Jones | Episode: "Recipe for Murder" |
| 2004 | Cold Case | Johnny | Episode: "The House" |
| 2005 | National Lampoon's Adam & Eve | Freddie | |
| 2005 | CSI: NY | Chad Willingham | 5 episodes |
| 2005 | The Inside | Louis Salt | Episode: "Point of Origin" |
| 2006–2010 | Supernatural | Ash | Recurring role (season 2), guest role (season 5) |
| 2006 | Push | Joe | |
| 2006 | Punk Love | Spike | |
| 2008 | The Other Side of the Tracks | Rusty | |
| 2009 | Sons of Anarchy | Meth Dealer | Episode: "Fix" |
| 2010 | I Spit on Your Grave | Matthew Duncan | |
| 2011 | NCIS | Joey Peanuts | Episode: "Baltimore" |
| 2011 | The Cape | Hicks | Episode: "Goggles and Hicks" |
| 2011 | Criminal Minds | Tony (one of the hallucinations) | Episode: "With Friends Like These" |
| 2011 | My Big Break | Himself | |
| 2012 | Castle | Marco Vinstrolli | Episode: "Secret's Safe with Me" |
| 2012 | Weeds | Detective Tipton | Episode: "Messy " |
| 2012 | Ghost Adventures | Himself (Guest Investigator) | |
| 2012 | Rise of the Zombies | Kyle | |
| 2014 | Ghost Stalkers | Himself (Co Host) | |
| 2014 | Midnight Rider | Joseph "Red Dog" Campbell | Unreleased film |
| 2014 | Major Crimes | Bill George | Episode: "Leap of Faith" |
| 2015 | Agents of S.H.I.E.L.D. | Dwight Frye | Episode: "Devils You Know" |
| 2016 | Manson's Lost Girls | Terry Melcher | TV film |
| 2017 | Security | Mason | |
| 2020 | Four Good Days | Eric | |
| 2021 | List of a Lifetime | Mike | TV film |
| 2023 | Star Trek: Picard | Ensign Foster | 3 episodes |
| 2024 | Horizon: An American Saga – Chapter 2 | Travis | |
| 2026 | The 'Burbs | Walters | 3 episodes |
