= Jo-Ann Mapson =

American novelist (born 1952)

- Jo-Ann Mapson
- Born: March 29, 1952 (age 74); Pasadena, California, U.S.
- Education: University of Redlands; California State University, Long Beach (BA); Vermont College (MFA)
- Occupation: Author
- Writing career
- Years active: 1990–present
- Website: www.joannmapson.com

Jo-Ann Mapson (born March 29, 1952) is an American author. She is the author of twelve works of fiction, set mainly in the American Southwest.

== Biography ==
She was born on March 29, 1952, in Pasadena, California, and now lives in Anchorage, Alaska. She attended Johnston College at the University of Redlands, graduated with a B.A. in English/Creative Writing from California State University Long Beach, and received her M.F.A. in both Poetry and Prose from Vermont College in 1992.

Mapson’s novels include series books—Hank & Chloe; Loving Chloe; Bad Girl Creek; Along Came Mary; Goodbye, Earl, as well as stand-alone novels. Their subject matter concerns women, friendship, love and child rearing and their families. An example of this is the 1996 novel, Shadow Ranch: A Novel which focuses on the women of the "Carpenter Clan" and the so-called curse which effects all members of the family over several generations. It shows the women overcoming the problems by love, dedication and a focus on the Carpenter Clan.

Her second novel, Blue Rodeo, was adapted into a CBS television film of the same name, starring Ann-Margret and Kris Kristofferson. In 2006 Simon & Schuster published The Owl & Moon Café.

She has taught English and Creative Writing at Orange Coast College, University of California Irvine extension, California State University Fullerton extension, Matanuska-Susitna College and now teaches in the M.F.A. Program in Writing at the University of Alaska Anchorage. She is also a graduate advisor for Prescott College’s MAP Program. Her former writing students (now published) include: Christina Adams, Judy Alexander, Earlene Fowler, Judi Hendricks, Joyce Weatherford.

Her papers are being collected in Boston University’s Twentieth Century Authors Archive in "The Jo-Ann Mapson Collection".

== Bibliography ==
- Spooking the Horses (poems) chapbook
- Fault Line (stories) (1990) ISBN 0-944870-02-3
- Hank & Chloe (1993) ISBN 0-06-016943-5
- Blue Rodeo (1994) ISBN 0-06-016944-3
- Shadow Ranch (1996) ISBN 0-06-017216-9
- Loving Chloe (1998) ISBN 0-06-017217-7
- The Wilder Sisters (1999) ISBN 0-06-019116-3
- Bad Girl Creek (2001) ISBN 0-7432-0256-2
- Along Came Mary (2003) ISBN 0-7432-2461-2
- Goodbye, Earl (2004) ISBN 0-7432-2463-9
- The Owl & Moon Café (2006) ISBN 0-7432-6641-2
- Solomon's Oak (2010) ISBN 978-1-60819-330-1
- Finding Casey (2012) ISBN 978-1-60819-924-2
- Owen's Daughter (2014) ISBN 978-1-62040-148-4
