= The White River Kid =

- DVD cover art
- Directed by: Arne Glimcher
- Screenplay by: David Leland
- Based on: The Little Brothers of St. Mortimer by John Fergus Ryan
- Produced by: Antonio Banderas; Arne Glimcher; Robert Greenhut; Elie Samaha
- Starring: Bob Hoskins; Antonio Banderas; Ellen Barkin
- Cinematography: Michael Chapman
- Edited by: Sam O'Steen
- Music by: John Frizzell
- Production companies: Franchise Pictures; St. Mortimer Productions Inc.
- Distributed by: New City Releasing
- Release date: November 12, 1999 (Spain)
- Running time: 99 minutes
- Country: United States
- Language: English

The White River Kid (also titled White River and The Conmen) is a 1999 American comedy film directed by Arne Glimcher and starring Bob Hoskins, Antonio Banderas and Ellen Barkin. It is based on the novel The Little Brothers of St. Mortimer by John Fergus Ryan.

== Plot ==
Brother Edgar is a sock salesman who was harassed by the police into buying expensive peddler's licenses, so decided to operate under the fictitious Little Brothers of St. Mortimer. With his assistant Morales, he travels the Southern states of the USA selling socks out of his truck.

After pulling over at a river to allow Morales to relive himself, Brother Edgar is robbed by the White River Kid, a notorious bandit in the area. After escaping the Kid, Brother Edgar saves Morales from Sheriff Becker, who is running for reelection. Stopping at a diner later that day, Edgar and Morales spot the Kid at an adjoining table and quickly leave as the police arrive. Once in their truck, the discover both the Kid and the diner's waitress, Apple Lisa, who has immediately fallen in love with the Kid. The Kid forces them to drive to Lomax Falls, to ask Apple Lisa's family for her hand in marriage.

At a gas station along the way, they are accosted by the Bunn brothers, who later hold up the truck on a side road. Morales and the Kid kill the brothers and leave the bodies to be eaten by wild razorback hogs, forging a stronger connection amongst the group. At a campaign stop for Sheriff Becker, Brother Edgar meets Eva Nell La Fangroy, a seductive woman, while Morales spots Ralph Pines, a bagman seen paying off Becker and accepting money from businesses they'd visited on their trip. Brother Edgar gives a blessing for Sheriff Becker, which Apple Lisa interrupts to sing Brother Edgar's praises and gather donations for his "charity."

They arrive at Apple Lisa's family home, situated next to a crater left by a factory explosion and next door to Eva Nell's Tea House. Morales, who has been reading a litigation law book, convinces Apple Lisa's brother Reggie to sue a local lumber company responsible for the loss of his front teeth, and learns that the company is also paying protection money to Pines. Brother Edgar learns that Eva Nell is blind and she warns her friend Sheriff Becker against his close relationship to Pines. Morales and Reggie find financial success extorting other local business responsible for Reggie's physical misfortunes, but meet violence when they approach Pines with their newfound services.

Brother Edgar takes the Kid to neighboring Hot Springs, Arkansas, where the Kid's distinctive butterfly face tattoo is removed to avoid further identification. Apple Lisa and the Kid are married at the family home, and Brother Edgar spends the night with Eva Nell. Morales falsely tells the Kid that the Sheriff is coming for him, and uses the Kid's violent nature to exact revenge on Pines, forcing a confrontation during which the Kid is shot off a cliff by Pines, who is subsequently killed by Morales, and Apple Lisa accidentally takes possession of Pines' suitcase of money. Eva Nell decides to join Brother Edgar on the road, convinces the Sheriff to take credit for the Kid's death, in order to help his reelection chances, and reveals that she isn't blind after all. The pair take off for Texas to help blind kids, while Morales and Reggie are revealed to have made it to Las Vegas.

== Cast ==
- Bob Hoskins as Brother Edgar
- Antonio Banderas as Morales Pittman
- Ellen Barkin as Eva Nell La Fangroy
- Wes Bentley as White River Kid
- Kim Dickens as Apple Lisa
- Randy Travis as Sheriff Becker
- Swoosie Kurtz as Mummy Weed
- Beau Bridges as Daddy Weed
- Michael Massee as Ralph Pines
- Chad Lindberg as Reggie Weed

== Production ==
The film was shot in Hot Springs, Arkansas, Mount Ida, Arkansas, and Petit Jean State Park, with additional filming in Sheridan, Arkansas during Timberfest.

== Reception ==
Ann Hodges of the Houston Chronicle graded the film a B−.
