= Tortilla Heaven =

2007 American comedy film by Judy Hecht Dumontet

- Theatrical release poster
- Directed by: Judy Hecht Dumontet
- Written by: Judy Hecht Dumontet; Julius Robinson
- Produced by: Gilbert Dumontet; Pepe Iturralde; Courtney Mizel; Judy Hecht Dumontet
- Starring: José Zúñiga; George Lopez; Miguel Sandoval; Olivia Hussey; Elpidia Carrillo; Alexis Cruz; Jude Herrera (as a different name); Marcelo Tubert; Lupe Ontiveros
- Cinematography: Chuy Chávez
- Edited by: Vanick Moradian; Hiroshi Kubota; Rick Fields
- Music by: Christopher Lennertz
- Distributed by: Archangel Releasing
- Release date: March 16, 2007
- Running time: 97 minutes
- Country: United States
- Language: English

Tortilla Heaven is a 2007 American comedy film directed, co-written, and co-produced by Judy Hecht Dumontet. It was produced by her husband, senior VP of Sony Pictures, Gilbert Dumontet ("Straw Dogs"). It features an ensemble cast including José Zúñiga, George Lopez, Miguel Sandoval, Olivia Hussey, Elpidia Carrillo, Alexis Cruz, Jude Herrera (as a different name), Marcelo Tubert, and Lupe Ontiveros. It revolves around a Mexican restaurant run by Isidor, who discovers an awe-inspiring image burned into one of his freshly made tortillas: the face of Jesus.

== Premise ==
A tiny town in New Mexico is turned upside down when the image of Christ appears - burned onto a tortilla - in the community's only restaurant, "Tortilla Heaven." Chaos ensues among the townfolk.

== Cast ==
- José Zúñiga as Isidor "Izzy" Navarro
- Miguel Sandoval as Gil Garcia
- Olivia Hussey as Petra
- Elpidia Carrillo as Hermenegilda
- Alexis Cruz as Marco
- Jude Herrera as Dinora (as a different name)
- Marcelo Tubert as Father Pancracio
- Irene Bedard as Liberata
- Lupe Ontiveros as Adelfa
- Del Zamora as Ruffino
- George Lopez as Everardo
- Deborah Chavez as Vangie
- Geno Silva as Don Transito
- Rick Gutierrez as Bulmaro
- Jonathan Levit as Dr. Webman
- Ana Ortiz as Chicana
- Elaine Miles as Caridad
- Scott Cleverdon as Jesus
- Danny Peck as Maclovio
- Courtney Mizel as Jackie
- Aaron Webman as José
- Richard Purdy as Saint Peter
- David Allen Cluck as Financial News Reporter

== Reception ==
=== Box office ===
Tortilla Heaven grossed $105,401 in the United States.

=== Controversy ===
During principal photography for the movie, producers failed to meet payment obligations to the cast. After release of the movie, multiple claims have been filed with and legal action has been taken by the Screen Actors Guild against producers on behalf of its union actors that worked on the film.

=== Critical response ===
On the review aggregator website Rotten Tomatoes, 25% of 12 critics' reviews are positive, with an average rating of 4.5/10. Metacritic, which uses a weighted average, assigned the film a score of 22 out of 100, based on 4 critics, indicating "generally unfavorable" reviews.

Michael Ordoña of the Los Angeles Times stated, "The experience of watching Tortilla Heaven is like a frozen smile: The film and its makers simply try too hard. Director and co-writer Judy Hecht Dumontet can't stop "helping" with overactive editing and scoring, such as tinkling bells every time the sacred tortilla is shown early on."

Justin Chang of Variety wrote, "As flat as a tortilla and considerably less nourishing, Tortilla Heaven cooks up a muddled religio-comic fable" and "Pic's almost exclusively Latino and Native American cast is mostly reduced to playing folksy caricatures, feverishly crossing themselves and peppering their Mexican-accented English with the odd exclamation in Spanish."

Tim Grierson of LA Weekly stated, "If it was simply a jokey commentary on the dangers of greed and religious fervor, Tortilla Heaven would be forgivable. But Hecht Dumontet deserves special derision for her hypocritical condescension toward Falfúrrias' simple-folk caricatures, rendering them as God-fearing dolts worthy of scorn until the patronizing finale, which tries for a spiritual uplift that's as disingenuous as it is incompetently executed."

Brandon Fibbs of Christianity Today wrote, "While a fable is an amusing and compelling way to relate a story with a serious point, Tortilla Heaven at times undermines its message by stretching the comedy to its limits" and "For all of its flaws and shortcomings, Tortilla Heaven can't help but be charming and undeniably entertaining. The film's heart is always in the right place."

Rory L. Aronsky of Film Threat wrote, "Oh how I wanted to like Tortilla Heaven. Really like it. Saturday-afternoon-movie like it." However, he also opined, "It's disappointing, because not only does George Lopez and many of the actors deserve a little better (Lopez, among others, is grossly underused), but Chuy Chavez's vivid cinematography makes a more extensive walk around the town seem very attractive."

=== Accolades ===
| Year | Award | Category | Recipient(s) | Result | Ref. |
|---|---|---|---|---|---|
| 2008 | ALMA Awards | Outstanding Performance of a Lead Latino/Latina Cast in a Motion Picture | José Zúñiga, Miguel Sandoval, Olivia Hussey, Elpidia Carrillo, Alexis Cruz, Jude Herrera, Marcelo Tubert, Lupe Ontiveros, Del Zamora, George Lopez | Nominated | |
