= Jude Herrera =

American actress

- Born: New Mexico, United States
- Occupation: Actress
- Years active: 1996–present

Jude Herrera is an American actress. She is the recipient of several accolades for her performances in film and television.

== Early life and education ==
Herrera was born in New Mexico, U.S.A.

== Career ==
In 1996, Herrera originated the role of Aracely in Bellyfruit, a teen pregnancy-themed stage play which premiered at Los Angeles Theatre Center's mainstage and was directed by Kerri Green. She made her onscreen debut that year, portraying a Deaf youth in a CBS movie, Blue Rodeo, starring alongside Ann-Margret and Kris Kristofferson for director Peter Werner.

== Selected filmography ==
=== Film ===
Year	Title	Role
1997	East of Hope Street	Alicia Montalvo
1997	The Postman	Carrier
1997	Melting Pot (aka Race)	Dolores
1998	Yellow Wooden Ring (short film)	Greta
1998	Restons Groupés	Desawenta
1998	Legend of Two-Path (docu-drama)	Ascopah
1999	The Green Mile	Bitterbuck's Daughter
2000	The Independent	Carole/Blue Sky
2001	Tortilla Soup	Eden
2001	The Doe Boy	Geri
2002	The Flats	Paige
2007	Tortilla Heaven	Dinora
2010	Inhale	Claudia

=== Television ===
Year	Title	Role	Notes
1996	Blue Rodeo	Bonnie Tsotsie	TV movie
1997	ER	Pedes Nurse	Episode: "Friendly Fire"
1998	Felicity	(Guest-star role)	Episode: "Drawing the Line: Part 1"
1999	Walker Texas Ranger	Rachel Falcon	2-part Episode: "Team Cherokee" (Parts I and II)
1999	Air America	(Guest-star role)	Episode: "Engraved Danger"
2000	Camp P	(Recurring role)	TV pilot for MTV
2006	Wildfire	Leanne Diaz y Ruiz	Episode: "A Good Convict is Hard to Find"
2008	Living Hell (aka Organizm)	Pfc. Una Fernandes	TV movie

== Awards and nominations ==
Year	Award	Category	Nominated work	Result	Ref.
1997	FAITA Awards	Outstanding New Performance	Blue Rodeo	Won	
2000	FAITA Awards	Performance Award	Walker Texas Ranger (2-part episode: Team Cherokee I and II)	Won	
2001	American Indian Film Festival	Best Supporting Actress Award	The Doe Boy	Won	
2008	ALMA Awards	Outstanding Performance of a Lead Latino/a Cast in a Motion Picture	Tortilla Heaven	Nominated (Shared)	
