= Greg Fawcett =

American actor

Gregory Fawcett
- Born: Gregory Wendell Fawcett; November 30, 1967 (age 58); Minneapolis, Minnesota, United States
- Occupation: Actor
- Years active: 1992–present
- Spouse: Melita Paleka (m. 2000; sep. 2016)

Gregory Wendell Fawcett (born November 30, 1967, in Minneapolis, Minnesota) is an American film and television actor, producer and screenwriter. He attended a private boarding school on the East Coast and graduated with his BA in the Dramatic Arts program at the University of Southern California. He has appeared and worked alongside some of Hollywood's biggest names and has performed in numerous television shows such as The New Adventures of Robin Hood, Point Pleasant, Fashion House and Sunset Beach as well as the films Ca$h, Jack Woody and the adaption of Beyond the Wall of Sleep. In 2015, Gregory was an executive producer and actor in the movie Street which went on to generate worldwide success on Netflix with a second movie in development planned for 2018. Fawcett also has an uncredited role as “Handsome Young Man” in Fox’s 1992 television film Count DeClues' Mystery Castle starring Max Maven. One of his most well known roles is as himself in Tony Zierra's 2011 documentary My Big Break which follows the early careers of Fawcett, Wes Bentley, Chad Lindberg and Brad Rowe. In 2022 Gregory worked opposite Ron Perlman in "The Last Victim"
