= A Glitch in the Matrix =

2021 film by Rodney Ascher

- Official release poster
- Directed by: Rodney Ascher
- Produced by: Ross M. Dinerstein
- Starring: Nick Bostrom; Joshua Cooke; Erik Davis; Alex LeVine; Brother Læo Mystwood; Paul Gude; Jesse Orion; Emily Pothast; Jeremy Felts; Chris Ware
- Cinematography: George Feucht
- Edited by: Rodney Ascher; Rachel Tejada
- Music by: Jonathan Snipes
- Animation by: Lorenzo Fonda; Davy Force; Mindbomb Films
- Production companies: Campfire; Highland Park Classics; Valparaiso Pictures
- Distributed by: Magnolia Pictures
- Release dates: January 31, 2021 (Sundance); February 5, 2021 (United States)
- Running time: 108 minutes
- Country: United States
- Language: English
- Box office: $2,238

A Glitch in the Matrix is a 2021 American documentary film directed by Rodney Ascher. The film had its world premiere at the Sundance Film Festival on January 31, 2021, and was released theatrically and on digital platforms on February 5, 2021, by Magnolia Pictures to generally positive reviews.

== Premise ==
Part science fiction mind-scrambler, part horror story, A Glitch in the Matrix is a multimedia exploration of the simulation hypothesis – an "idea as old as Plato's Republic and as current as Elon Musk's Twitter feed" – through the eyes of those who suspect the world we live in is not real.

== Cast ==
The following cast members feature in the film as themselves:

- Nick Bostrom
- Joshua Cooke
- Erik Davis
- Philip K. Dick
- Alex LeVine
- Læo Mystwood
- Paul Gude
- Jesse Orion

== Production ==
The film was first announced on February 4, 2019, as part of the European Film Market, with Quiver Entertainment, then known as Kew Media Distribution, handling international sales. On December 15, 2020, the film was selected as part of the 2021 Sundance Film Festival lineup. The following day, Magnolia Pictures acquired worldwide rights to the film. Alongside the announcement, a teaser trailer was released.

== Release ==
The film had its world premiere on January 31, 2021, at the 2021 Sundance Film Festival as part of the Midnight section. The film was then given a limited theatrical release on February 5, 2021, as well as a digital release via premium video on demand.

In its opening weekend, the film grossed $3,000 in the United States.

== Critical reception ==
On review aggregator Rotten Tomatoes, the film holds a 68% Fresh rating, with the site's critical consensus reading "Although occasionally muddled, A Glitch in the Matrix is a thought-provoking portrait of digital culture and its relationship to reality." The film has an average score of 6.2/10 based on 98 critic reviews. On Metacritic, the film has a score of 62/100 based on 25 critic reviews.

Wendy Ide of Screen International called the documentary "fascinating, mind-expanding, infuriating, bewildering," and "bracingly ambitious" in a positive review. John DeFore of The Hollywood Reporter wrote that "though it leaves some avenues under-explored and gives a bit too much attention to the sci-fi landmark name-checked in its title, the film makes for engrossing, sometimes unsettling viewing" in another mostly positive review. Leslie Felperin of The Guardian gave the film 3/5 stars, stating that "what's missing from this fecund brew, which you could imagine being twice as long, is any kind of judgment or analysis of the subjects." Noel Murray from the Los Angeles Times wrote that "while the doc may be overlong, it's consistently fascinating because of its implications" in a mixed review.
