= Leon Vitali =

English actor (1948–2022)

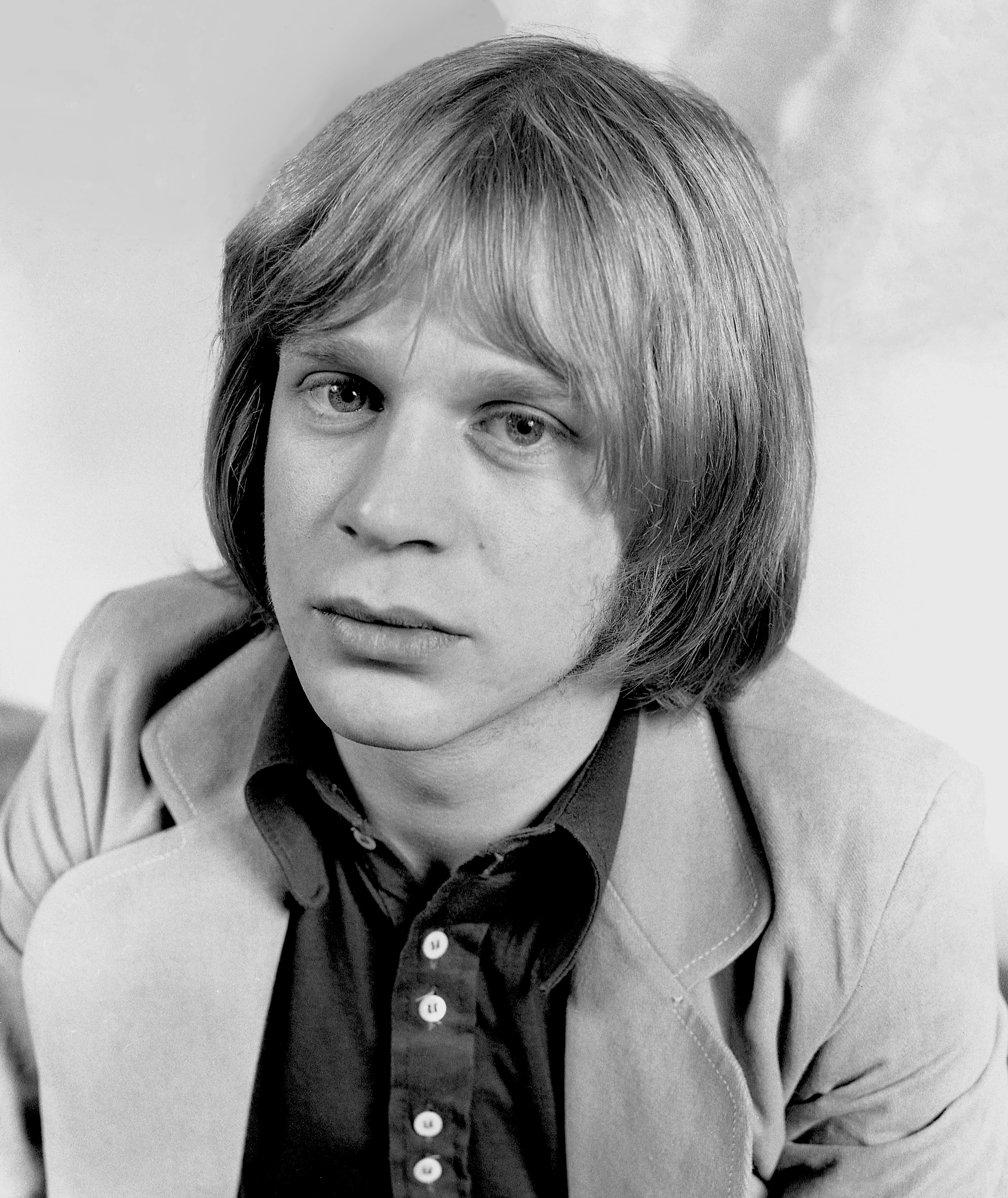
- Vitali in 1974
- Born: Alfred Leon Vitali; 26 July 1948; Leamington Spa, Warwickshire, England
- Died: 19 August 2022 (aged 74); Los Angeles, California, U.S.
- Education: London Academy of Music and Dramatic Art
- Occupation: Actor
- Years active: 1970–2018
- Spouses: Helen Broom (m. 1968, divorced) Kersti Gustafsson (divorced) Sharon Messer (m. 2005–2022)
- Children: Masha, Max and Vera

Alfred Leon Vitali (26 July 1948 – 19 August 2022) was an English actor best known for his collaborations with film director Stanley Kubrick, as his personal assistant, and most notably as Lord Bullingdon in Barry Lyndon.

== Early life ==
As he was growing up, Vitali became interested in drama and decided to attend the London Academy of Music and Dramatic Art after his English teacher sent him a prospectus.

== Career ==
Vitali guest-starred in a number of TV series in the early 1970s, appearing in Softly, Softly, Follyfoot, Roads to Freedom, Z Cars, Public Eye, The Fenn Street Gang, and Notorious Woman, among others. In 1973, he made his feature film debut in two movies: the Italian Super Bitch, directed by Massimo Dallamano, who had previously worked with Sergio Leone as a cinematographer in the first two of his Dollars Trilogy, and the television film Catholics, alongside Martin Sheen and Michael Gambon.

In 1974, Vitali met Stanley Kubrick, with whom he had a professional relationship for the rest of Kubrick's career. Vitali played Lord Bullingdon in Barry Lyndon, the title character's stepson. Kubrick and Vitali bonded during the shoot. As documented in Tony Zierra's 2017 film Filmworker, as the end of shooting approached, Vitali told Kubrick that he would be interested in working on the production side of filmmaking. Kubrick responded by encouraging Vitali to gain some relevant industry experience and to let him know when he had done so. Vitali subsequently starred in 1977's Terror of Frankenstein, during which he asked if he could sit in on the cutting room editing process, without pay. His request was granted and he wrote to Kubrick as promised. Shortly afterwards, Kubrick sent Vitali a copy of Stephen King's The Shining and asked him to join the production of his next film. Vitali is credited in The Shining (1980) as "personal assistant to director".

Vitali teamed up with Kubrick again for Full Metal Jacket (1987), where he served both as casting director and assistant to the director. Twelve years later, Vitali was credited with the same titles in Kubrick's last film, Eyes Wide Shut (1999), in which Vitali also played Red Cloak. In the film, the words "fashion designer Leon Vitali" appear in a newspaper article that Tom Cruise's character reads.

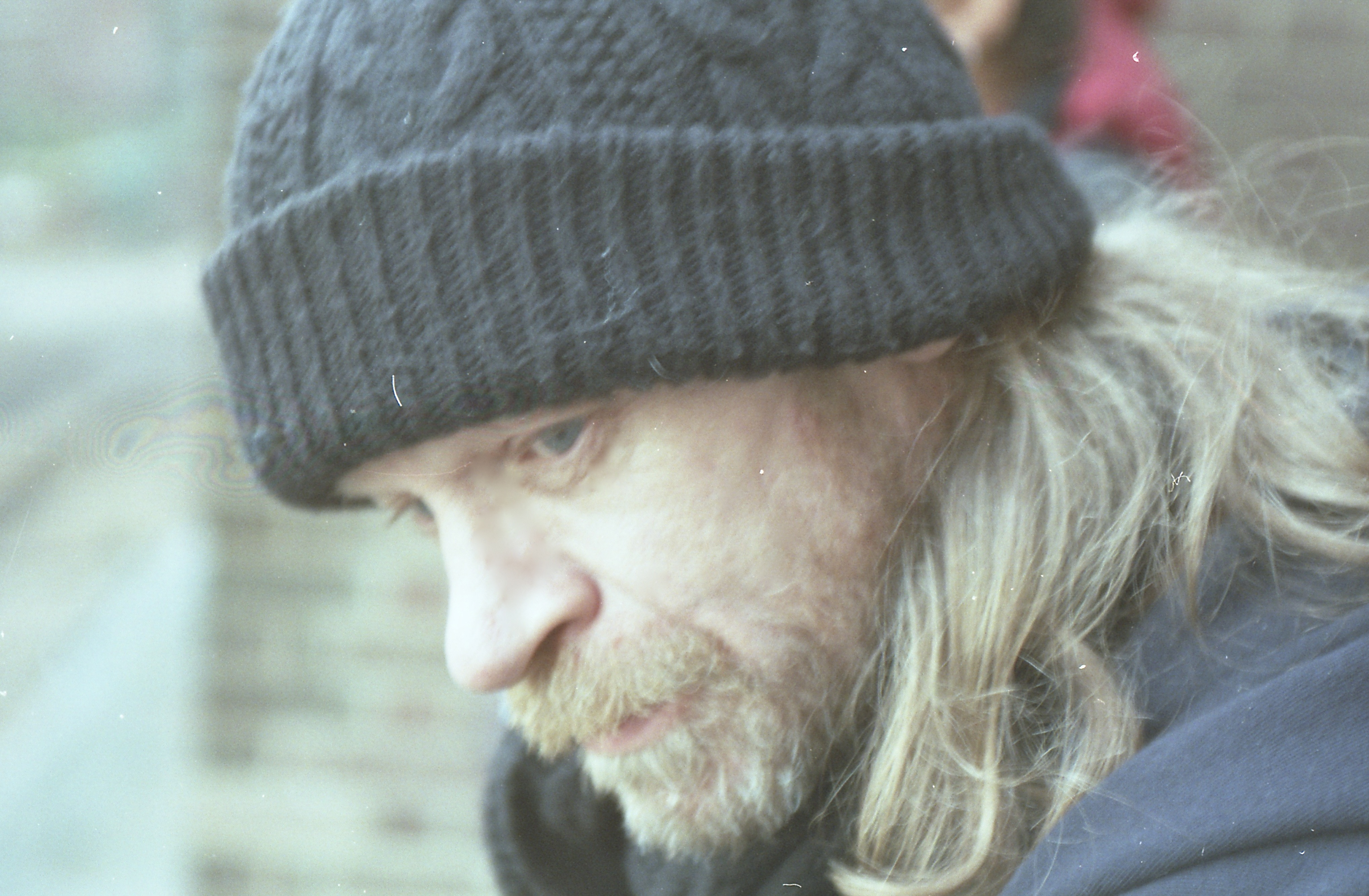
Vitali in 2013

After Kubrick's death, Vitali oversaw the restoration of both picture and sound elements for most of Kubrick's films. In 2004, Vitali was honoured with the Cinema Audio Society's President's Award for this work.

In 2017, Vitali was the subject of a documentary, Filmworker, directed by Tony Zierra and produced by Elizabeth Yoffe which premiered at The Cannes Film Festival and screened at many U.S. and international film festivals including the London Film Festival in October 2017. In Filmworker, Vitali was interviewed at length about his work with Kubrick. The film was broadcast by Film4 in the UK on 7 March 2019, followed by a showing of Kubrick's The Killing (1956).

== Personal life ==
In 1977, Vitali portrayed Victor Frankenstein in Terror of Frankenstein, Calvin Floyd's adaptation of Mary Shelley's Frankenstein, where he met his future wife Kersti, who worked as costume designer on the shoot. The Vitalis then worked as costume designers in Birgitta Svensson's Mackan, after which Leon played a bit part in Svensson's next film, Inter Rail (1981). Leon and Kersti had two children, actress Vera Vitali and a son, videographer Max Vitali. Vitali also had a daughter, producer Masha, from his previous marriage to Helen Broom. Leon and Kersti eventually divorced. Leon was married to Sharon Messer from 2005 to his death in 2022.

== Death ==
Leon Vitali died on 19 August 2022 in Los Angeles, as announced by his family. The official social media presence for the Kubrick estate announced Vitali's death citing the incorrect date of 20 August 2022.

== Other work ==
Vitali worked with filmmaker Todd Field, with whom he appeared in Eyes Wide Shut. Vitali is credited as "technical consultant" on Field's In the Bedroom (2001), and as "associate producer" on Field's Little Children (2006), where he also made a cameo appearance as "The Oddly Familiar Man".

== Filmography ==
=== Film ===
Year	Title	Role	Notes
1973	Super Bitch	Unknown	
1973	Catholics	Brother Donald	
1975	Barry Lyndon	Lord Bullingdon	
1977	Terror of Frankenstein	Victor Frankenstein	
1981	Inter Rail	Ron	
1999	Eyes Wide Shut	Red Cloak	
2006	Little Children	Oddly Familiar Man	
2013	Romeo & Juliet	Apothecary	
2016	Director's Commentary: Terror of Frankenstein	Leon Vitali	Voice role
2018	Haunted, Horrifying Sounds from Beyond the Grave	Nigel	Short film
2023	I Am What You Imagine		Short film, voice role

=== Television ===
Year	Title	Role	Notes
1970	Softly, Softly: Task Force	Henry Mardsley	Episode: "Safe in the Streets?"
1970	The Roads to Freedom	Youth	TV miniseries
1971	Z Cars	Bagley	Episode: "Nobody Wins, Nobody Loses: Part 1"
1971	Long Voyage Out of War	Peter Price	Episode: "The Gentle Invasion"
1971	Hadleigh	Bob	Episode: "A Letter to David"
1971	Public Eye	Peter	Episode: "I Always Wanted a Swimming Pool"
1971	Justice	Brian Parsons	2 episodes
1971	Please Sir!	Peter Craven	Episode: "Old Fennians Day"
1971–1972	The Fenn Street Gang	Peter Craven	16 episodes
1972–1973	Crown Court	Terrence Stein, Peter Thornhill	2 episodes
1973	Love Story	Jack Truscott	Episode: "Two Tame Oats"
1973	Follyfoot	Brian Foley	Episode: "Miss Him When He's Gone"
1973	Up the Workers	Fergy (1976)	
1973	Van der Valk	Jos Busselink	Episode: "A Dangerous Point of View"
1973	Crime of Passion	Gerard	Episode: "Gerard"
1973	ITV Saturday Night Theatre	Brother Donald	Episode: "Conflict"
1974	Notorious Woman	Jules Sandeau	2 episodes
1975	Dixon of Dock Green	Eric Mercer	Episode: "Baubles, Bangles and Beads"
1975	Comedy Playhouse	Eric	Episode: "Captive Audience"
1975	Prometheus: The Life of Balzac	Jules Sandeau	TV miniseries
