= Billy's Hollywood Screen Kiss =

- Theatrical release poster
- Directed by: Tommy O'Haver
- Written by: Tommy O'Haver
- Produced by: David Moseley
- Starring: Sean P. Hayes; Brad Rowe; Richard Ganoung; Meredith Scott Lynn
- Cinematography: Mark Mervis
- Edited by: Jeff Betancourt
- Music by: Alan Ari Lazar
- Production company: Revolutionary Eye
- Distributed by: Trimark Pictures
- Release dates: January 1998 (Sundance); July 24, 1998 (U.S.)
- Running time: 92 minutes
- Country: United States
- Language: English
- Box office: $2 million

Billy's Hollywood Screen Kiss is a 1998 American independent romantic comedy film written and directed by Tommy O'Haver and starring Sean P. Hayes, Brad Rowe, and Meredith Scott Lynn. The film was a breakthrough performance for Hayes, who would go on to gain worldwide fame for his portraying Jack McFarland on the hit television series Will & Grace.

== Plot ==
Midwest native Billy Collier is an aspiring photographer in Los Angeles, who has had little artistic success and much romantic frustration. While out for coffee with his roommate named Georgiana, he comes up with the idea of recreating iconic screen kisses from Hollywood movies. That night at a party, Billy's friend Perry agrees to finance the project. Later, Billy serendipitously runs into their coffee waiter Gabriel, whom he recruits to model.

Billy becomes infatuated with Gabriel, but cannot figure out if Gabriel is straight. Gabriel claims he has a girlfriend in San Francisco, but sends ambiguous signals. At Perry's invitation, the two attend an exhibit by photographer Rex Webster, who tries to poach Gabriel as a model (and potential trick). Webster offers to take Gabriel to Catalina Island for an underwear ad shoot, sparking Billy's jealousy. Back at Gabriel's place, Billy and Gabriel seem to be getting closer but their rapport is interrupted by a phone call from Gabriel's girlfriend Natalie.

Billy shoots his first setup with Gabriel, a recreation of Burt Lancaster and Deborah Kerr's kiss on the beach in From Here to Eternity. Following the shoot, Gabriel tells Billy that his relationship with Natalie is over. Billy mentions the Kinsey scale, on which Billy describes himself as a "perfect six," but Gabriel admits he does not know where on the scale he falls. Back at Billy's apartment, they continue to talk and drink and Gabriel asks if he can spend the night on the couch. Billy suggests that Gabriel sleep in his bed (ostensibly because of Gabriel's height), to which Gabriel eventually agrees. When the two are in bed, Billy makes tentative overtures, to which Gabriel seems to respond initially; however, Gabriel suddenly pulls away, after which Billy apologizes and gets up to sleep on the couch.

Gabriel gets the underwear modeling job and goes to Catalina. Billy follows after him to Catalina with Georgiana, who is on the rebound from a tumultuous relationship with her boyfriend Andrew. On the island, she hooks up with drug-addled island resident "Gundy". Billy crashes Rex Webster's underwear shoot looking for Gabriel, but does not find him. He eventually tracks him down later that night at Rex's party, and they talk on the beach.

Billy relates to Gabriel how confused he was when he came out, saying, "I swore to myself that if I could ever be there for somebody, I would, so that that person wouldn't have to go through all the shit I went through. What I'm trying to say is, if you're having problems figuring out where you stand, even if you're not sure of what you're supposed to want-" Abruptly, however, before Billy can finish, one of Gabriel's fellow male models walks up to them. Billy instantly realizes that the two of them are in some kind of relationship with each other, and though Gabriel tries to soften the blow, a humiliated and hurt Billy rebuffs him, going as far as making accusations that Gabriel used him to advance his modeling career before storming off. Perry later consoles Billy by telling him that he, too, had fallen for someone who did not return his affections; he confesses that man to be Billy. The next morning, Georgiana has ditched Gundy, and both she and Billy head back home.

The movie ends a few months later with the opening of Billy's "Hollywood Screen Kiss" series exhibition in Los Angeles, which includes his photos of Gabriel. The exhibit appears to be very successful, and Billy receives many congratulations from various visitors. Perry shows Billy a magazine with an underwear ad featuring Gabriel and suggests that Billy give him a call, but he decides against it. Towards the end of the night, Billy meets a handsome young man, Joshua, who enthusiastically admires Billy's work. It is suggested that along with his newfound artistic success, Billy may at last find romantic fulfillment as well.

== Cast ==
- Sean P. Hayes as Billy Collier
- Brad Rowe as Gabriel
- Richard Ganoung as Perry
- Meredith Scott Lynn as Georgiana
- Matthew Ashford as Whitey
- Armando Valdes-Kennedy as Fernando
- Paul Bartel as Rex Webster
- Holly Woodlawn as Holly
- Christopher Bradley as Andrew
- Robbie Cain as Joshua
- Carmine D. Giovinazzo as Gundy
- Les Borsay as Les
- Jason-Shane Scott as Brad
- Kimiko Gelman as Donna
- Annabelle Gurwitch as Gallery Owner

== Production ==
The film is a remake of writer and director O'Haver's earlier short film Catalina.

The film is punctuated with Billy's fantasy sequences of himself and Gabriel in pastiches of romantic film scenes, including the aforementioned From Here to Eternity and the films of Fred Astaire. Billy carries a Polaroid camera with him everywhere, and his reminiscences are illustrated with Polaroid photographs. The film in fact opens with such a monologue, with Billy relying on a series of Polaroids while relating how he grew up gay "in a small town in Indiana, where there's plenty of corn, fast cars, and straights. Lots and lots of straights. I mean, a lot." Billy's opening narrative demonstrates his awareness that he is in a film and breaking the fourth wall.

Several scenes in the movie are backed up by classic songs of bygone times sung by notable and lesser known divas; these are lip-synced by more or less the same troupe of drag queens, a running gag throughout the film.

== Reception ==
On the film review aggregator website Rotten Tomatoes, the film holds an approval rating of 78% based on 23 reviews, with an average rating of 6.7/10. The website's critical consensus reads, "Insubstantial yet charming, Billy's Hollywood Screen Kiss tells a love story that's as rooted in classic Hollywood as it is in timely themes".

=== Home media ===
Billy's Hollywood Screen Kiss was released on Region 1 DVD on December 22, 1998.

== Soundtrack ==
The soundtrack was released on compact disc on August 11, 1998. The track listing is as follows:

1. "Do What You Wanna" – Ramsey Lewis
2. "Love Me or Leave Me" – Nina Simone
3. "The Harem of Guadaloupe/Mystic Tango"*
4. "Happy Heart" – Petula Clark
5. "The Love Slave of Catalina" – Tonya Kelly
6. "This Is My Song" – Petula Clark
7. "Theme for Rex Webster"*
8. "Moon over Quito"*
9. "Cuban Love Song" – Xavier Cugat
10. "Gabriel's Room"*
11. "Happy Heart" (Junior Vasquez remix) – Petula Clark
12. "Georgiana" - Carmine D. Giovinazzo

The film's original score was composed by Alan Ari Lazar.

== Awards and nominations ==
- Deauville Film Festival Grand Special Prize (nominated)
- Sundance Film Festival Grand Jury Prize - Dramatic (nominated)
- Verzaubert - International Gay & Lesbian Film Festival Rosebud Award for Best Film (won)
