= Rodney Ascher =

American film director

Rodney Ascher is an American film director, best known for his 2012 documentary Room 237.

== Early life ==
His mother is Jewish, and he resides in Hollywood.

== Awards ==
- Best Director Award at the Austin Fantastic Fest (2012, won for Room 237)
- Best Editing Award from the International Documentary Association (2012, won for Room 237)

== Filmography ==
=== Fiction ===
- Hot Chicks (2006, segment "Somebody Goofed")
- The ABCs of Death 2 (2014, segment "Q is for Questionnaire")
- Haunted, Horrifying Sounds from Beyond the Grave

== Non-fiction ==
- Room 237 (2012)
- The Nightmare (2015)
- The El Duce Tapes (2019)
- A Glitch in the Matrix (2021)
- Ghost Boy (2025)

=== Short films ===
- Bad Dog (1989)
- Alfred (1997)
- Triumph of Victory (2001)
- Shirts & Skins (2008)
- Visions of Terror (2008)
- Dog Days (2009)
- The Lonely Death of the Giggler (2010)
- The S from Hell (2010, documentary short)
- Primal Screen (2016, documentary short)

=== Appearances ===
- Lynch/Oz (2022)
- Incident at Ong's Hat (2023)

=== As Producer / Executive Producer ===
- Director's Commentary: Terror of Frankenstein (2015)
- Sex Madness Revealed (2018)
- Where Does a Body End? (2019)

== Television ==
- Bridal Shop (2007, 7 episodes)
- UCB Comedy Originals (2008, 1 episode - "Man Boobs")
- The Very Funny Show (2007, 6 episodes)
