= Tony Zierra =

American director and producer

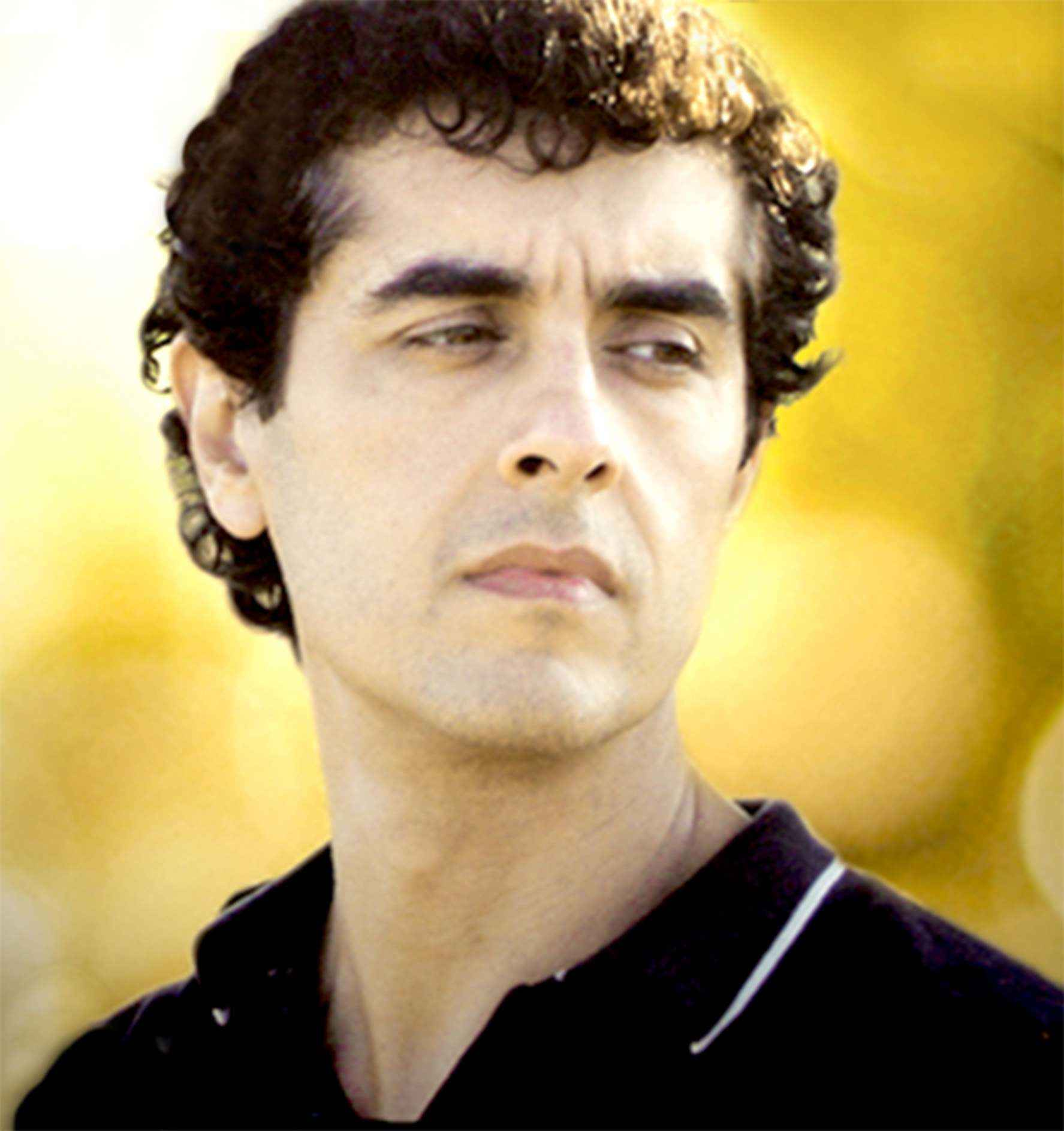
- Tony Zierra from 2011
- Occupations: Director, Producer
- Years active: 1999–present

Tony Zierra is an American director and producer. He is best known for the documentaries My Big Break (2009), in which he also appeared, and Filmworker (2017).

From an early age Zierra's goal was to become a filmmaker. He attended film studies classes at NYU, Texas A&M and UCLA. His first documentary, Carving Out Our Name, premiered at the Toronto International Film Festival to much acclaim. Shortly after, Zierra went on the road to capture America's reaction to the September 11 attacks. The film that emerged,USA The Movie, explores the cyclical nature of violence and retaliation. The film was the subject of an in-depth analysis from a Deleuzian perspective by scholar and commentator Dion Dennis.

Zierra's award-winning documentary, My Big Break, is a cautionary tale about the darker side of celebrity and the consequences of fame that also includes his struggle to make his first film. My Big Break has received consistently strong reviews and has been repeatedly praised for its unusually candid look at the effects of success on young rising stars in Hollywood.

My Big Break won Best Documentary at the Boston Film Festival, Best Documentary at Artsfest, Pennsylvania, was nominated for Best Documentary at the Raindance Film Festival in London and was an official selection of The American Cinematic Experience Festival in New York. Zierra has been a featured speaker at The Popular Culture American Culture (PCA/ACA) national academic conference in New Orleans, PCA/ACA Southwest/Texas academic conference and the PCA/ACA national academic conference in Boston.

Zierra's latest production is the documentary SK13: Kubrick's Endgame about the legendary filmmaker, Stanley Kubrick. The film premiered on July 18, 2025 at the Low Cinema in Ridgewood, New York which was opened by filmmaker John Wilson and partners. The film deals specifically with the Kubrick film Eyes Wide Shut, this being Kubrick's 13th feature film. His documentary Filmworker. about the life of Stanley Kubrick's longtime assistant, Leon Vitali was part of the Cannes Film Festival Official Selection 2017 premiering in Cannes Classics
