= Murder (disambiguation) =

Murder is the unlawful killing of a human being by another.

Murder may also refer to:

== Art, entertainment, and media ==
=== Films ===
- Murder!, 1930 British International Pictures release, directed by Alfred Hitchcock
- Murder (film series), three Indian films, produced by Mukesh Bhatt, emphasizing adult themes combined with violence
  - Murder (2004 film), first installment, in 2004, of Bollywood film series, Murder
  - Murder 2, second installment, in 2011, of Bollywood film series, Murder
  - Murder 3, third installment, in 2013, of Bollywood film series, Murder
- Murder (1993 film), a Hong Kong film by Lawrence Cheng
- Hatya: The Murder, a 2004 Indian Hindi-language film
- Murder (2020 film), an Indian Telugu-language crime thriller film

=== Gaming ===
- Murder (game), a parlour game
- Murder! (video game), 1990 video game published by U.S. Gold
- Murdered: Soul Suspect, a 2014 video game by Square Enix
- Murder, computer game published by Rabbit Software

=== Music ===
- Murder (album), an album by Gehenna
- The Murder (album), a 2017 album by Boondox
- Murder, the third disc in the three-disc Johnny Cash compilation Love, God, Murder
- "The Murder", music score composed by Bernard Herrmann for the 1960 film Psycho

==== Songs ====
- "Murder" (song), by New Order
- "Murder", by Annihilator on the album Remains
- "Murder", by Ashlee Simpson on the album Bittersweet World
- "Murder", by Bad Religion on the album New Maps of Hell
- "Murder", by Coldplay on the single "God Put a Smile upon Your Face"
- "Murder", by The Crystal Method on the album Tweekend
- "Murder", by David Gilmour on the album About Face
- "Murder", by Dawn of Solace on the album Affliction Vortex
- "Murder", by Helmet on the album Strap It On
- "Murder", by Horse the Band on the album A Natural Death
- "Murder", by Jack Green on the album Humanesque
- "Murder", by Jay Sean featuring Thara Prashad, included in the album My Own Way
- "Murder", by Justin Timberlake on the album The 20/20 Experience (2 of 2)
- "Murder", by Katatonia on the album Brave Murder Day
- "Murder", by Misery Signals on the album Of Malice and the Magnum Heart
- "Murder", by The Pogues on the album Hell's Ditch
- "Murder", by Powerman 5000 on the album Destroy What You Enjoy
- "Murder", by Royce da 5'9" on the album Street Hop
- "Murder", by Sepultura on the album Arise
- "Murder", by Spice on the mixtape Captured
- "Murder", by Susumu Hirasawa from Sword-Wind Chronicle BERSERK Original Soundtrack
- "Murder", by UGK on the album Ridin' Dirty
- "Murders", by Miracle Musical on the album Hawaii: Part II

=== Television ===
- Murder (UK TV series), a 2012 and 2016 British crime series broadcast by BBC Two
- Murder (U.S. TV program), a 2007 American reality competition television program that aired on Spike
- Murder (2002 TV series), a British miniseries broadcast by BBC
- "Murder" (The Office), 2009 episode of American comedy TV series

== Other uses ==
- Murder, the collective noun for a group of crows
- The Murder (short story), story by John Steinbeck

== See also ==
- Murder, Inc. (disambiguation)
- Murder One (disambiguation)
- Murderer (disambiguation)
- Act of Murder (disambiguation)
- Murda (disambiguation)
