= Marli Renfro =

American model and actress

- Born: April 3, 1938 (age 88); Los Angeles, California
- Occupations: Showgirl, photographic model, actress
- Modeling information
- Height: 5 ft 4 in (1.63 m)
- Hair color: Red

Marli Renfro (born April 3, 1938 in Los Angeles, California) is an American former showgirl, model, Playboy cover girl and actress.

She was the body double for Janet Leigh in the shower scene of the 1960 film Psycho.

== Early career ==
Renfro, described as a free spirit with a lifelong commitment to nudism, appeared in many men's magazines including Ace, Adam, Beau, Dude, Escapade, Follies, Gala and Modern Man. She also appeared on the cover of the September 1960 edition of Playboy.

Renfro spent some time working as a showgirl in Las Vegas, and also worked as a Playboy Bunny.

== Film career ==
Unperturbed by working nude, Renfro was hired as the body double for the actress Janet Leigh in Alfred Hitchcock's 1960 film Psycho. She was paid $500. The shower scene in Psycho is considered one of the most famous scenes in cinema history. It features more than 50 camera cuts in three minutes and took six days to film. Although nudity is implied in the rapid cuts, none is seen. Hitchcock and Leigh initially maintained that only Leigh appeared in the shower. Only later did Hitchcock acknowledge that when Leigh's face is seen it is her, otherwise it is Renfro. Leigh's accounts of the shower scene, however, insist that all the actual shower footage in the film was of her and the only times Renfro was used was in an overhead shot that was eventually cut due to censors' concerns, and then as Marion's dead body being removed by Norman Bates and put in the car trunk.

Renfro subsequently appeared in Francis Ford Coppola's 1962 film Tonight for Sure.

Decades later, Renfro was interviewed and featured in 78/52, director Alexandre O. Philippe's 2017 documentary film that examines Psycho and the shower scene.

== Confusion regarding death ==
During the filming of Psycho, Janet Leigh also had a stand-in to check lighting. Her name was Myra Davis, also known as Myra Jones. In 1988 Davis was raped and murdered by her neighbor and handyman Kenneth Dean Hunt. Possibly due to fascination with the shower scene, sections of the media confused Davis's role and published that she had been Leigh's body double. The BBC went further and not only asserted that Davis was Leigh's body double, but also that Davis was the voice of Norman Bates' mother, although this character had been voiced by Virginia Gregg and Jeanette Nolan. In his 2002 book Body Double, author Don Lasseter compounded the confusion and wrote that Davis and Renfro were the same person, meaning that Renfro was dead.

Author Robert Graysmith, who had a lifelong fascination with Renfro, noted a comment by Davis's granddaughter that Davis would never have done nude work. He set out to find Renfro and discovered that she was living in California. He subsequently wrote a book, The Girl in Alfred Hitchcock's Shower (2010), about Renfro's role in Psycho and the confusion over Davis's death.

== Personal life ==
Renfro married and is known as Marli Renfro Peterson. She has lived in the Mojave Desert since 1970.
