= Dancing with the Stars (American TV series) season 13 =

Season 13 of the US TV show

Dancing with the Stars
- Season 13
- Promotional poster, featuring former pro dancers Kym Johnson and Tristan MacManus
- Hosted by: Tom Bergeron; Brooke Burke Charvet
- Judges: Carrie Ann Inaba; Len Goodman; Bruno Tonioli
- Celebrity winner: J.R. Martinez
- Professional winner: Karina Smirnoff
- No. of episodes: 20

Release
- Original network: ABC
- Original release: September 19 – November 22, 2011

Season chronology
- ← Previous; Season 12 Next → Season 14

Season thirteen of Dancing with the Stars premiered on September 19, 2011, on the ABC network.

Actor J. R. Martinez and Karina Smirnoff were crowned the champions, while Rob Kardashian and Cheryl Burke finished in second place, and talk show host Ricki Lake and Derek Hough finished in third.

== Cast ==
=== Couples ===
Nine professional partners — Derek Hough, Maksim Chmerkovskiy, Cheryl Burke, Tony Dovolani, Mark Ballas, Lacey Schwimmer, Karina Smirnoff, Anna Trebunskaya, and Kym Johnson — returned this season. Maksim's brother, Valentin Chmerkovskiy, made his debut competing as a professional. Peta Murgatroyd and Tristan MacManus, part of season 12's troupe of dancers, also became professional partners for the first time. Louis van Amstel did not compete as a professional, but participated in a new segment called "Ballroom Battles", which was cancelled on November 7. The dance troupe consisted of six dancers: Sharna Burgess, Dasha Chesnokova, Oksana Dmytrenko, Sasha Farber, Kiki Nyemchek, and Ted Volynets, plus the first eliminated male and female pros, who ended up being Val Chmerkovskiy and Peta Murgatroyd.

This season featured twelve celebrity contestants. The cast was revealed during an episode of Bachelor Pad on August 28, 2011. The twelve professionals were revealed on August 31, 2011 during Good Morning America. Actor Ryan O'Neal was planning on competing as a celebrity, but could not after knee surgery, so Carson Kressley took his place.

From the start, controversy erupted over the inclusion of Chaz Bono, the child of singers Sonny and Cher. His appearance resulted in backlash from conservative supporters of the show, who even threatened to boycott due to his transgender status. Despite the criticism, Bono received strong support from the LGBT community. It was stated in LGBT Weekly that "Bono has become the transgender community's living symbol of hope, strength and defiance against vitriolic hate. When ABC Television announced that Bono would appear on DWTS, he faced vile slurs and death threats from a group of trans-phobic women and men." The controversy did lead producers to hire extra security protection for his time on the show.

Celebrity	Notability	Professional partner	Status
Ron Artest	NBA small forward	Peta Murgatroyd	Eliminated 1st on September 20, 2011
Elisabetta Canalis	Model & actress	Valentin Chmerkovskiy	Eliminated 2nd on September 27, 2011
Kristin Cavallari	Reality television personality	Mark Ballas	Eliminated 3rd on October 4, 2011
Chynna Phillips	Wilson Phillips singer & solo artist	Tony Dovolani	Eliminated 4th on October 11, 2011
Carson Kressley	Television host	Anna Trebunskaya	Eliminated 5th on October 18, 2011
Chaz Bono	Transgender activist & author	Lacey Schwimmer	Eliminated 6th on October 25, 2011
David Arquette	Actor	Kym Johnson	Eliminated 7th on November 1, 2011
Nancy Grace	HLN host & prosecutor	Tristan MacManus	Eliminated 8th on November 8, 2011
Hope Solo	U.S. national soccer team goalkeeper	Maksim Chmerkovskiy	Eliminated 9th on November 15, 2011
Ricki Lake	Actress & talk show host	Derek Hough	Third place on November 22, 2011
Rob Kardashian	Reality television personality	Cheryl Burke	Runners-up on November 22, 2011
J. R. Martinez	Actor & Army veteran	Karina Smirnoff	Winners on November 22, 2011

=== Host and judges ===
Carrie Ann Inaba, Len Goodman, and Bruno Tonioli returned as the judges, while Tom Bergeron and Brooke Burke Charvet returned as hosts.

== Scoring chart ==
The highest score each week is indicated in bold green with a dagger (†), while the lowest score each week is indicated in italicized red with a double-dagger (‡).

Color key:

Winners
Runners-up
Third place
Bottom two
Eliminated

Dancing with the Stars (season 13) - Weekly scores
Couple	Pl.	Week										
Couple	Pl.	1	2	3	4	5	6	7	8	9	10	
Couple	Pl.	1	2	3	4	5	6	7	8	9	Night 1	Night 2
J.R. & Karina	1st	**22**†	22	26	26	**28**†	**29**†	25+23=48	30+30=**60**†	23+27+6=56	24+30=54‡	+28+30=112 (Note: This couple finished in first place.)
Rob & Cheryl	2nd	16	21	24	24	25	22	25+26=51	27+24=51	28+27+10=65	27+30=**57**†	+26+30=**113**† (Note: This couple finished in second place.)
Ricki & Derek	3rd	20	**23**†	**27**†	**29**†	24	**29**†	27+26=**53**†	28+24=52	30+29+8=**67**†	27+27=54‡	+30=84 (Note: This couple finished in third place.)
Hope & Maks	4th	21	19	24	24	24	20	24+26=50	27+25=52	21+24+4=49‡ (Note: This couple was eliminated.)		
Nancy & Tristan	5th	16	21	21	21	22	24	21+23=44‡ (Note: This couple was in the bottom two, but was not eliminated.)	24+20=44‡			
David & Kym	6th	18	18	24	23	25	23	24+23=47				
Chaz & Lacey	7th	17	17‡	18‡	21	21	19‡					
Carson & Anna	8th	17	18	23	20‡	19‡						
Chynna & Tony	9th	**22**†	21	26	21							
Kristin & Mark	10th	19	22	24								
Elisabetta & Val	11th	15	21									
Ron & Peta	12th	14‡										

== Weekly scores ==
Individual judges' scores in the charts below (given in parentheses) are listed in this order from left to right: Carrie Ann Inaba, Len Goodman, Bruno Tonioli.

=== Week 1: First Dances ===
Each couple performed either the cha-cha-cha or the Viennese waltz. Couples are listed in the order they performed.

Couple	Scores	Dance	Music	Result
Ron & Peta	14 (5, 4, 5)	Cha-cha-cha	"Krazy" — Pitbull, feat. Lil Jon	Eliminated
Rob & Cheryl	16 (6, 5, 5)	Viennese waltz	"Lake Michigan" — Rogue Wave	Safe
Kristin & Mark	19 (7, 6, 6)	Cha-cha-cha	"Dynamite" — Taio Cruz	Safe
Chynna & Tony	22 (8, 7, 7)	Viennese waltz	"If I Ain't Got You" — Alicia Keys	Safe
Nancy & Tristan	16 (5, 5, 6)	Cha-cha-cha	"Cry Baby" — Cee Lo Green	Safe
David & Kym	18 (6, 6, 6)	Viennese waltz	"Somebody to Love" — Queen	Safe
Elisabetta & Val	15 (5, 5, 5)	Cha-cha-cha	"Last Friday Night (T.G.I.F.)" — Katy Perry	Safe
Hope & Maks	21 (7, 7, 7)	Viennese waltz	"Satellite" — Dave Matthews Band	Safe
Carson & Anna	17 (6, 5, 6)	Cha-cha-cha	"Moves Like Jagger" — Maroon 5, feat. Christina Aguilera	Safe
J.R. & Karina	22 (8, 7, 7)	Viennese waltz	"Breakaway" — Kelly Clarkson	Safe
Ricki & Derek	20 (7, 6, 7)	Viennese waltz	"This Year's Love" — David Gray	Safe
Chaz & Lacey	17 (6, 5, 6)	Cha-cha-cha	"Dancing in the Street" — Martha & the Vandellas	Safe

=== Week 2: Top 11 ===
Each couple performed either the jive or the quickstep. Couples are listed in the order they performed.

Couple	Scores	Dance	Music	Result
Hope & Maks	19 (6, 7, 6)	Jive	"Girlfriend" — Avril Lavigne	Safe
Kristin & Mark	22 (8, 7, 7)	Quickstep	"Diamonds Are a Girl's Best Friend" — from Gentlemen Prefer Blondes	Safe
David & Kym	18 (6, 6, 6)	Jive	"Runaway Baby" — Bruno Mars	Bottom two
Elisabetta & Val	21 (7, 7, 7)	Quickstep	"Don't Get Me Wrong" — The Pretenders	Eliminated
Rob & Cheryl	21 (7, 7, 7)	Jive	"Surfin' Safari" — The Beach Boys	Safe
Carson & Anna	18 (6, 6, 6)	Quickstep	"Walkin' Back to Happiness" — Helen Shapiro	Safe
Ricki & Derek	23 (8, 7, 8)	Jive	"Hey Ya!" — OutKast	Safe
Chaz & Lacey	17 (6, 5, 6)	Quickstep	"Love Is All Around" — Joan Jett & the Blackhearts	Safe
Chynna & Tony	21 (7, 7, 7)	Jive	"The Boy Does Nothing" — Alesha Dixon	Safe
Nancy & Tristan	21 (6, 8, 7)	Quickstep	"It Don't Mean a Thing (If It Ain't Got That Swing)" — Duke Ellington	Safe
J.R. & Karina	22 (7, 7, 8)	Jive	"Jump, Jive an' Wail" — The Brian Setzer Orchestra	Safe

=== Week 3: Most Memorable Year Week ===
Each couple performed one unlearned dance. Couples are listed in the order they performed.

Couple	Scores	Dance	Music	Result
Rob & Cheryl	24 (8, 8, 8)	Foxtrot	"Fly Me to the Moon" — Frank Sinatra	Safe
Chynna & Tony	26 (8, 9, 9)	Rumba	"Hold On" — Wilson Phillips	Safe
Chaz & Lacey	18 (6, 6, 6)	Rumba	"Laugh at Me" — Sonny Bono	Safe
Kristin & Mark	24 (8, 8, 8)	Samba	"Crazy in Love" — Beyoncé, feat. Jay-Z	Eliminated
Carson & Anna	23 (8, 7, 8)	Tango	"It's My Life" — No Doubt	Safe
J.R. & Karina	26 (9, 8, 9)	Rumba	"If You're Reading This" — Tim McGraw	Safe
Nancy & Tristan	21 (7, 7, 7)	Waltz	"Moon River" — Andy Williams	Safe
Ricki & Derek	27 (9, 9, 9)	Rumba	"Gravity" — Sara Bareilles	Safe
Hope & Maks	24 (8, 8, 8)	Cha-cha-cha	"Tonight (I'm Lovin' You)" — Enrique Iglesias, feat. Ludacris	Safe
David & Kym	24 (8, 8, 8)	Rumba	"O-o-h Child" — Five Stairsteps	Safe

=== Week 4: Movie Week ===
Each couple performed one unlearned dance. Couples are listed in the order they performed.

Couple	Scores	Dance	Music	Film	Result
Chynna & Tony	21 (7, 7, 7)	Tango	"Theme from Mission: Impossible" — Adam Clayton & Larry Mullen, Jr.	Mission: Impossible	Eliminated
David & Kym	23 (8, 7, 8)	Paso doble	"The Raiders March" — John Williams	Raiders of the Lost Ark	Safe
Carson & Anna	20 (7, 6, 7)	Viennese waltz	"The Black Pearl" — Klaus Badelt	Pirates of the Caribbean: The Curse of the Black Pearl	Safe
Nancy & Tristan	21 (7, 7, 7)	Paso doble	"Flash's Theme" — Queen	Flash Gordon	Safe
Hope & Maks	24 (8, 8, 8)	Foxtrot	"You've Got a Friend in Me" — Randy Newman	Toy Story	Safe
Rob & Cheryl	24 (8, 8, 8)	Paso doble	"Theme from Superman" — John Williams	Superman	Safe
Ricki & Derek	29 (10, 9, 10)	Tango	"The Murder" — Bernard Herrmann	Psycho	Safe
Chaz & Lacey	21 (7, 7, 7)	Paso doble	"Gonna Fly Now" — Bill Conti	Rocky	Safe
J.R. & Karina	26 (8, 9, 9)	Foxtrot	"The Pink Panther Theme" — Henry Mancini	The Pink Panther	Safe

=== Week 5: '80s Week ===
The couples performed one unlearned dance to a song released in the 1980s. Couples are listed in the order they performed.

Couple	Scores	Dance	Music	Result
Hope & Maks	24 (8, 8, 8)	Tango	"Livin' on a Prayer" — Bon Jovi	Safe
Carson & Anna	19 (6, 6, 7)	Jive	"Wake Me Up Before You Go-Go" — Wham!	Eliminated
Nancy & Tristan	22 (7, 7, 8)	Rumba	"True" — Spandau Ballet	Safe
J.R. & Karina	28 (9, 9, 10)	Samba	"Conga" — Gloria Estefan	Safe
Rob & Cheryl	25 (9, 8, 8)	Rumba	"Hello" — Lionel Richie	Safe
Chaz & Lacey	21 (7, 7, 7)	Samba	"Get Down on It" — Kool & the Gang	Safe
David & Kym	25 (8, 9, 8)	Tango	"Tainted Love" — Soft Cell	Safe
Ricki & Derek	24 (8, 8, 8)	Foxtrot	"Easy Lover" — Phillip Bailey & Phil Collins	Safe

=== Week 6: Broadway Week ===
Each couple performed one unlearned dance and a group Broadway dance. Couples are listed in the order they performed.

Couple	Scores	Dance	Music	Broadway show	Result
Rob & Cheryl	22 (8, 7, 7)	Cha-cha-cha	"Walk Like a Man" — The Four Seasons	Jersey Boys	Safe
Nancy & Tristan	24 (9, 7, 8)	Foxtrot	"Always Look on the Bright Side of Life" — Monty Python	Monty Python's Spamalot	Safe
David & Kym	23 (8, 7, 8)	Quickstep	"We Go Together" — Jim Jacobs & Warren Casey	Grease	Safe
Ricki & Derek	29 (10, 9, 10)	Quickstep	"Luck Be a Lady" — Frank Loesser	Guys and Dolls	Safe
Chaz & Lacey	19 (7, 6, 6)	Tango	"The Phantom of the Opera" — Andrew Lloyd Webber	The Phantom of the Opera	Eliminated
Hope & Maks	20 (7, 6, 7)	Rumba	"Seasons of Love" — Jonathan Larson	Rent	Safe
J.R. & Karina	29 (10, 9, 10)	Quickstep	"Hot Honey Rag" — Kander and Ebb	Chicago	Safe
Chaz & Lacey David & Kym Hope & Maks J.R. & Karina Nancy & Tristan Ricki & Derek Rob & Cheryl	No scores received	Group; Broadway	"Big Spender" — Cy Coleman & Dorothy Fields (from Sweet Charity) & "Money, Money" — Kander and Ebb (from Cabaret)		

=== Week 7: Halloween Week ===
Each couple performed one unlearned dance and a team dance. Couples are listed in the order they performed.

Couple	Scores	Dance	Music	Result
David & Kym	24 (8, 8, 8)	Cha-cha-cha	"Abracadabra" — Steve Miller Band	Eliminated
J.R. & Karina	25 (9, 8, 8)	Tango	"Ghostbusters" — Ray Parker Jr.	Safe
Nancy & Tristan	21 (7, 7, 7)	Jive	"The Devil Went Down to Georgia" — Charlie Daniels Band	Bottom two
Rob & Cheryl	25 (9, 8, 8)	Tango	"The Addams Family Theme" — Vic Mizzy	Safe
Ricki & Derek	27 (9, 9, 9)	Paso doble	"Sweet Dreams" — Beyoncé	Safe
Hope & Maks	24 (8, 8, 8)	Samba	"Werewolves of London" — Warren Zevon	Safe
David & Kym J.R. & Karina Nancy & Tristan	23 (8, 7, 8)	Team; Tango	"Disturbia" — Rihanna	
Hope & Maks Ricki & Derek Rob & Cheryl	26 (9, 8, 9)	Team; Paso doble	"Bring Me to Life" — Evanescence	

=== Week 8: Instant Choreography Week ===
Each couple performed two unlearned dances, one of which was an instant jive. Couples are listed in the order they performed.

Couple	Scores	Dance	Music	Result
Rob & Cheryl	27 (9, 9, 9)	Quickstep	"Take On Me" — A-ha	Safe
Rob & Cheryl	24 (8, 8, 8)	Jive	"Maneater" — Hall & Oates	Safe
Hope & Maks	27 (9, 9, 9)	Quickstep	"Valerie" — Mark Ronson, feat. Amy Winehouse	Safe
Hope & Maks	25 (8, 9, 8)	Jive	"The Best Damn Thing" — Avril Lavigne	Safe
Ricki & Derek	28 (9, 9, 10)	Waltz	"(You Make Me Feel Like) A Natural Woman" — Aretha Franklin	Safe
Ricki & Derek	24 (8, 8, 8)	Jive	"Land of a Thousand Dances" — Wilson Pickett	Safe
Nancy & Tristan	24 (8, 8, 8)	Tango	"The Naughty Lady of Shady Lane" — The Ames Brothers	Eliminated
Nancy & Tristan	20 (7, 6, 7)	Jive	"Upside Down" — Paloma Faith	Eliminated
J.R. & Karina	30 (10, 10, 10)	Waltz	"What the World Needs Now Is Love" — Burt Bacharach	Safe
J.R. & Karina	30 (10, 10, 10)	Jive	"Tutti Frutti" — Little Richard	Safe

=== Week 9: Semifinals ===
Each couple performed two unlearned dances, one of which was the Argentine tango, and a cha-cha-cha relay. Couples are listed in the order they performed.

Couple	Scores	Dance	Music	Result
Hope & Maks	21 (7, 7, 7)	Paso doble	"Can't Be Tamed" — Miley Cyrus	Eliminated
Hope & Maks	24 (8, 8, 8)	Argentine tango	"Whatever Lola Wants" — Gwen Verdon	Eliminated
J.R. & Karina	23 (8, 7, 8)	Paso doble	"Spanish Tango" — James Horner	Safe
J.R. & Karina	27 (9, 9, 9)	Argentine tango	"Bust Your Windows" — Jazmine Sullivan	Safe
Rob & Cheryl	28 (10, 9, 9)	Samba	"I Go to Rio" — Pablo Cruise	Safe
Rob & Cheryl	27 (9, 9, 9)	Argentine tango	"Libertango" — Bond	Safe
Ricki & Derek	30 (10, 10, 10)	Samba	"Jump in the Line" — Harry Belafonte	Safe
Ricki & Derek	29 (9, 10, 10)	Argentine tango	"Allerdings Otros Aires" — Otros Aires	Safe
Hope & Maks	4	Cha-cha-cha; Relay	"I Like How It Feels" — Enrique Iglesias, feat. Pitbull & The WAV.s	
J.R. & Karina	6	Cha-cha-cha; Relay	"I Like How It Feels" — Enrique Iglesias, feat. Pitbull & The WAV.s	
Ricki & Derek	8	Cha-cha-cha; Relay	"I Like How It Feels" — Enrique Iglesias, feat. Pitbull & The WAV.s	
Rob & Cheryl	10	Cha-cha-cha; Relay	"I Like How It Feels" — Enrique Iglesias, feat. Pitbull & The WAV.s	

=== Week 10: Finale ===
On the first night, the three couples performed two dances: a redemption dance selected by one of the judges, which was a style they had already performed earlier in the competition, and their freestyle routine. On the second night, each couple performed their favorite dance of the season, after which the couple with the lowest combined scores was eliminated. The two remaining couples then competed in a samba relay. Couples are listed in the order they performed.

Night 1

Couple	Judge	Scores	Dance	Music
Ricki & Derek	Carrie Ann Inaba	27 (9, 9, 9)	Cha-cha-cha	"Yeah 3x" — Chris Brown
Ricki & Derek	Carrie Ann Inaba	27 (9, 9, 9)	Freestyle	"Can't Touch It" — Ricki-Lee Coulter
Rob & Cheryl	Bruno Tonioli	27 (9, 9, 9)	Waltz	"It Is You (I Have Loved)" — Dana Glover
Rob & Cheryl	Bruno Tonioli	30 (10, 10, 10)	Freestyle	"Minnie the Moocher" — Cab Calloway
J.R. & Karina	Len Goodman	24 (8, 7, 9)	Cha-cha-cha	"Let's Get Loud" — Jennifer Lopez
J.R. & Karina	Len Goodman	30 (10, 10, 10)	Freestyle	"Whine Up" — Kat DeLuna, feat. Elephant Man

Night 2

Couple	Scores	Dance	Music	Result
Ricki & Derek	30	Tango	"The Murder" — Bernard Hermann	Eliminated (Third place)
Rob & Cheryl	26	Foxtrot	"Fly Me to the Moon" — Frank Sinatra	Safe
J.R. & Karina	28	Jive	"Jump, Jive an' Wail" — The Brian Setzer Orchestra	Safe
J.R. & Karina	30 (10, 10, 10)	Samba	"Shake Your Bon-Bon" — Ricky Martin	Winners
Rob & Cheryl	30 (10, 10, 10)	Samba	"Shake Your Bon-Bon" — Ricky Martin	Runners-up

== Dance chart ==
The couples performed the following each week:

- Week 1: One unlearned dance (cha-cha-cha or Viennese waltz)
- Week 2: One unlearned dance (jive or quickstep)
- Week 3: One unlearned dance
- Week 4: One unlearned dance
- Week 5: One unlearned dance
- Week 6: One unlearned dance & group Broadway dance
- Week 7: One unlearned dance & team dance
- Week 8: One unlearned dance & instant jive
- Week 9: Two unlearned dances & cha-cha-cha relay
- Week 10 (Finals, Night 1): One unlearned dance & freestyle
- Week 10 (Finals, Night 2): Favorite dance of the season & instant samba

Dancing with the Stars (season 13) - Dance chart
Couple	Week																	
Couple	1	2	3	4	5	6		7		8		9			10			
Couple	1	2	3	4	5	6		7		8		9			Night 1		Night 2	
J.R. & Karina	Viennese waltz	Jive	Rumba	Foxtrot	Samba	Quickstep	Group; Broadway	Tango	Team; Tango	Waltz	Jive	Paso doble	Argentine tango	Cha-cha-cha; Relay	Cha-cha-cha	Freestyle	Jive	Samba
Rob & Cheryl	Viennese waltz	Jive	Foxtrot	Paso doble	Rumba	Cha-cha-cha	Group; Broadway	Tango	Team; Paso doble	Quickstep	Jive	Samba	Argentine tango	Cha-cha-cha; Relay	Waltz	Freestyle	Foxtrot	Samba
Ricki & Derek	Viennese waltz	Jive	Rumba	Tango	Foxtrot	Quickstep	Group; Broadway	Paso doble	Team Paso doble	Waltz	Jive	Samba	Argentine tango	Cha-cha-cha; Relay	Cha-cha-cha	Freestyle	Tango	
Hope & Maks	Viennese waltz	Jive	Cha-cha-cha	Foxtrot	Tango	Rumba	Group; Broadway	Samba	Team Paso doble	Quickstep	Jive	Paso doble	Argentine tango	Cha-cha-cha; Relay				
Nancy & Tristan	Cha-cha-cha	Quickstep	Waltz	Paso doble	Rumba	Foxtrot	Group; Broadway	Jive	Team Tango	Tango	Jive							
David & Kym	Viennese waltz	Jive	Rumba	Paso doble	Tango	Quickstep	Group; Broadway	Cha-cha-cha	Team Tango									
Chaz & Lacey	Cha-cha-cha	Quickstep	Rumba	Paso doble	Samba	Tango	Group; Broadway											
Carson & Anna	Cha-cha-cha	Quickstep	Tango	Viennese waltz	Jive													
Chynna & Tony	Viennese waltz	Jive	Rumba	Tango														
Kristin & Mark	Cha-cha-cha	Quickstep	Samba															
Elisabetta & Val	Cha-cha-cha	Quickstep																
Ron & Peta	Cha-cha-cha																	

== Ratings ==
Episode	Airdate	Rating/Share (18–49)	Viewers (millions)
Performance show 1	September 19, 2011	4.0/10	19.03
Meet the cast	September 20, 2011	2.1/6	10.97
Results show 1	September 20, 2011	3.6/9	14.79
Performance show 2	September 26, 2011	3.3/8	16.23
Special	September 27, 2011	1.9/5	9.49
Results show 2	September 27, 2011	2.9/7	14.39
Performance show 3	October 3, 2011	3.1/8	16.40
Special	October 4, 2011	1.7/5	9.11
Results show 3	October 4, 2011	2.8/7	14.80
Performance show 4	October 10, 2011	3.1/8	16.30
Results show 4	October 11, 2011	3.2/8	16.60
Performance show 5	October 17, 2011	3.2/8	17.47
Results show 5	October 18, 2011	2.6/6	13.50
Performance show 6	October 24, 2011	3.1/8	16.99
Results show 6	October 25, 2011	2.6/7	14.10
Performance show 7	October 31, 2011	2.8/8	16.30
Results show 7	November 1, 2011	2.8/7	15.21
Performance show 8	November 7, 2011	3.4/8	18.03
Results show 8	November 8, 2011	2.7/7	14.80
Performance show 9	November 14, 2011	3.4/8	18.50
Results show 9	November 15, 2011	2.7/7	15.15
Performance show 10	November 21, 2011	3.5/9	19.61
Final results show	November 22, 2011	4.1/11	19.45
