= Alexandra Heller-Nicholas =

Australian film critic

Alexandra Heller-Nicholas is an Australian film critic and historian who has written several books in fields like horror film and women in film, including Rape-Revenge Films: A Critical Study (2011) and Masks in Horror Cinema (2019). She is co-editor of ReFocus: The Films of Elaine May (2019). Heller-Nicholas appears in Alexandre O. Philippe's 2024 documentary Chain Reactions, which celebrated the 50th anniversary of Tobe Hooper's 1974 film The Texas Chain Saw Massacre, interviewed alongside Stephen King, Patton Oswalt, Karyn Kusama and Takashi Miike. Her 2020 book 1000 Women in Horror, 1895 - 2020 was made into a feature documentary in 2025 which Heller-Nicholas wrote and appeared in, directed by Donna Davies. In 2026, Heller-Nicholas was announced as Co-Producer for Philippe's forthcoming documentary In Search of Nosferatu, with Patton Oswalt as Executive Producer.

== Biography ==
Born in 1974, Heller-Nicholas was raised in a suburb near Hanging Rock, Victoria, a landmark she felt was important in her life. In 1992, she began attending Australian National University, before going into several jobs such as librarian and goth clothing store manager. She later attended the University of Melbourne, where she obtained her PhD in cinema studies.

In 2011, Heller-Nicholas released her book Rape-Revenge Films: A Critical Study; it was later re-released as a tenth anniversary special edition in 2021. She later published Masks in Horror Cinema: Eyes Without Faces (2019), 1000 Women in Horror: 1895–2018 (2020), The Giallo Canvas (2021), Found Footage Horror Films: Fear and the Appearance of Reality (2014), and The Cinema Coven (2024). She wrote several monographs on individual films, such as The Hitcher (centered on the 1986 film), Ms. 45 (2017, centered on the film of the same name), and Suspiria (2015, centered on the film of the same name). She and Dean Brandum co-edited the 2019 volume ReFocus: The Films of Elaine May, centered on the titular entertainer's work.

Jenny Paola Ortega Castillo said that Heller-Nicholas' "career offers a rich tapestry of interests around the exploration of horror and women’s filmmaking; her works are constantly marked by provocative, deep and focused exploration and deliberate research". Payton McCarty-Simas wrote that "from her incisive work on rape-revenge films in 2011 to her insightful scholarship on women-directed witch films last year, her work has delivered canny criticism, nuance and poise to the field, with an emphasis on gender and power".

Heller-Nicholas has received two nominations for the Bram Stoker Award for Best Non-Fiction: Masks in Horror Cinema: Eyes Without Faces in 2019 and 1000 Women in Horror in 2020. In 2024, she won Writer of the Year at the Rondo Hatton Classic Horror Awards. Heller-Nicholas has also won four writing awards from the Australian Film Critics Association.

Heller-Nicholas is an adjunct professor at Deakin University at their School of Communication and Creative Arts. She wrote Donna Davies' 2025 documentary 1000 Women in Horror.

== Bibliography ==
- Rape-Revenge Films: A Critical Study (2011)
- Found Footage Horror Films: Fear and the Appearance of Reality (2014)
- Suspiria (2015)
- Ms. 45 (2017)
- The Hitcher (2018)
- Masks in Horror Cinema (2019)
- ReFocus: The Films of Elaine May (2019; edited with Dean Brandum)
- 1000 Women in Horror, 1895-2018 (2020)
- The Giallo Canvas (2021)
- The Cinema Coven (2024)
