= Memory: The Origins of Alien =

2019 documentary film

- Directed by: Alexandre O. Philippe
- Written by: Alexandre O. Philippe
- Based on: Alien (1979) by: Dan O'Bannon; Ronald Shusett
- Produced by: Kerry Deignan Roy
- Production companies: Exhibit A Pictures; Milkhaus; Screen Division
- Distributed by: Screen Media Films; Legion M Indie Sales
- Release date: January 24, 2019 (Sundance Film Festival)
- Running time: 90 minutes
- Country: United States
- Language: English
- Box office: $38,995

Memory: The Origins of Alien is a 2019 documentary film that traces the origins of the film Alien (1979). Directed and written by Alexandre O. Philippe and produced by Kerry Deignan Roy, the documentary delves into the history of the classic science fiction film directed by Ridley Scott. It focuses on the idea that film is "a collective art form – not just the wider circle of writers, performers and technicians beyond the director, but in the case of the truly great films, serendipitous access to a deeper collective unconscious", tracing the connections from H. P. Lovecraft to Francis Bacon to the Greek Furies.

The film was nominated for Audience Award in the Copenhagen International Documentary Festival and Edinburgh International Film Festival.

== Synopsis ==
Memory: The Origins of Alien explores the origins of director Ridley Scott's film Alien (1979). The film includes original story notes, rejected designs and storyboards, exclusive behind-the-scenes footage, and screenwriter Dan O'Bannon's original 29-page script of Memory (1971).

== Cast ==
- Tom Skerritt
- Veronica Cartwright
- Roger Corman
- Ben Mankiewicz
- Axelle Carolyn
- Henry Jenkins
- Roger Christian
- Nicholas Cull

== Production ==
Director Alexandre O. Philippe announced Memory: The Origins of Alien while he was promoting his 2017 documentary film 78/52, which is based on the 1960 film Psycho. Philippe said he was fascinated by the tagline of Alien and he further added after watching Alien (1979) that it "blew him away". Talking about his approach, Philippe said, "I love to tackle cinema and pop culture in a way that is rooted in some deep idea that needs to be explored further."

Philippe credited the 1944 painting Three Studies for Figures at the Base of a Crucifixion by Francis Bacon for getting him excited about exploring the Alien franchise. He further added, "If you looked at the artwork, you'll say, 'That's just a little tidbit of trivia'".

== Reception ==
=== Critical response ===
On the review aggregator Rotten Tomatoes, the film holds an approval rating of 81% based on 80 reviews, with an average rating of 7.1/10. The website's critical consensus reads: "Memory - The Origins of Alien offers an entertaining inside look at the making of a classic — and compellingly analyzes its creation in the context of its era." Metacritic, which uses a weighted average, assigned the film a score of 70 out of 100, based on 18 critics, indicating "Generally favorable reviews".

Phil Hoad of The Guardian wrote: "Francis Bacon, Greek myth and unsung script hero Dan O'Bannon are given their due in this richly obsessive film about the making of a sci-fi classic". Dan Jolin of Time Out wrote: "However, thanks to 20th Century Fox's rich archives and the quality of the dark space-saga's DVD/Blu-Ray extras, there is honestly not much in Memory – named after Alien creator Dan O'Bannon's first title for the script – that warrants its claim to be the 'untold' story of its origin". Anton Bitel of the Little White Lies wrote: "But what Philippe's documentary traces is the way in which Alien transforms the perverted (pro)creative process at the heart of its own making into the main theme and central mystery of its ongoing story". Owen Gleiberman writing for Variety wrote, "Memory captures the hypnotic layers of history and meaning that were folded into the shock value of Alien".

=== Accolades ===
Award	Year	Category	Result	Ref.
Copenhagen International Documentary Festival	2019	Politiken's Audience Award	Nominated	
Edinburgh International Film Festival	2019	Audience Award	Nominated	
