= Kim Novak's Vertigo =

2025 documentary film

- Film poster
- Directed by: Alexandre O. Philippe
- Written by: Alexandre O. Philippe
- Produced by: Terri Piñon
- Starring: Kim Novak
- Cinematography: Robert Muratore
- Edited by: David Lawrence
- Music by: Jon Hegel
- Production companies: Gull House Films; Medianoche Productions
- Release date: September 2, 2025 (Venice)
- Running time: 76 minutes
- Country: United States
- Language: English

Kim Novak's Vertigo is a 2025 American documentary film written and directed by Alexandre O. Philippe, about the Hollywood Golden Age star Kim Novak, emphasizing her central role in Alfred Hitchcock's psychological thriller film Vertigo (1958).

The film had its world premiere out of competition at the 82nd Venice International Film Festival on September 2, 2025. Novak was awarded the Golden Lion for Lifetime Achievement at the festival.

== Reception ==
On the review aggregator website Rotten Tomatoes, 88% of 26 critics' reviews are positive, with an average rating of 7/10.

Leslie Felperin of The Hollywood Reporter wrote that the film "is essentially a cinematic fan letter, written with love but chock full of gushing, purple prose, some of it by the subject herself."

Guy Lodge of Variety wrote, "Slight in some respects, Philippe's 76-minute film resonates as what is today a vanishingly rare first-hand window into the joys, terrors and vagaries of Hollywood's golden age."

Novak herself stated that she loved the film.

== Home media ==
Kino Lorber released the film on DVD on October 13, 2026.
