= Ian Freer =

British non-fiction author, film magazine editor and newspaper writer

Ian Freer is a British non-fiction published author, film magazine editor and newspaper writer who has written several books relating to films.

He is currently employed with the film magazine Empire and is one of their senior reviewers as well as the assistant editor of the magazine.

He is also a writer for several newspapers, including the Daily Telegraph and the Guardian covering film subjects and film history. These have included an overview of the works of Stanley Kubrick.

In 2010, he appeared in the documentary comedy film The People vs. George Lucas.

In 2019, Freer wrote a published review of the audio and sound design within the movie Sound of Metal.

== Education ==
He is an alumnus of the National Film and Television School.

== Works ==
In 1997, he co-edited the Empire Film Quiz Book.

In 2007, he authored The Complete Spielberg, a guide to the films of Steven Spielberg. This includes discussion of Saving Private Ryan and the nature of heroics within the film.

In 2009, he authored a title Movie Makers: 50 Iconic Directors from Chaplin to the Coen Brothers, published by Quercus that covers film directors including Charlie Chaplin, Quentin Tarantino, and David Lean among others.
