= William Shatner: You Can Call Me Bill =

- Promotional poster
- Directed by: Alexandre O. Philippe
- Written by: Alexandre O. Philippe
- Produced by: Jeff Annison; Kerry Deignan Roy; Bryan Talebi
- Narrated by: William Shatner
- Cinematography: Robert Muratore
- Edited by: Patrick Huber
- Production companies: Exhibit A Pictures; CCG Guardian Entertainment; Legion M
- Distributed by: Legion M
- Release dates: March 2023 (SXSW); March 22, 2024
- Running time: 96 minutes
- Country: United States
- Language: English
- Box office: $480,991

William Shatner: You Can Call Me Bill is a 2023 American documentary film about Canadian actor William Shatner. It is written and directed by Alexandre O. Philippe.

== Reception ==
On review aggregator website Rotten Tomatoes, the film holds an approval rating of 84%, based on 32 reviews. On Metacritic, the film holds a rating of 68 out of 100, based on 13 critics, indicating "generally favorable reviews".

Clint Worthington of RogerEbert.com gave the film three out of four stars and wrote, "At the ripe age of ninety, Shatner remains as alive as ever—his eyes wild with curiosity and humor, his honeyed voice barely worn down by years of voiceover and soliloquy. But he remains deeply aware of his own numbered days, which makes You Can Call Me Bill feel like something of a self-administered cinematic eulogy. He's clearly grappling with the finality and impermanence of it all, whether here or in live events that see him entertaining audiences with poetic thoughts on the end of his life or the vastness of the universe."

You Can Call Me Bill qualified to be considered for a 2025 Academy Award in the Best Documentary Feature category.
