= Doc of the Dead =

- Official release poster
- Directed by: Alexandre O. Philippe
- Written by: Alexandre O. Philippe; Chad Herschberger
- Produced by: Robert Muratore; Kerry Deignan Roy
- Starring: Simon Pegg; George A. Romero
- Cinematography: Robert Muratore
- Edited by: Chad Herschberger
- Music by: Shawn King
- Production companies: Geekscape Productions; Red Letter Media
- Distributed by: Exhibit A Pictures
- Release date: March 10, 2014 (SXSW)
- Running time: 81 minutes
- Country: United States
- Language: English

Doc of the Dead is a 2014 American documentary film written and directed by Alexandre O. Philippe that focuses on the zombie genre. The film had its world premiere on March 10, 2014, at South by Southwest, followed by a television premiere on Epix on March 15. It features several entertainers that have had an impact on, and been affected by, the zombie genre and culture.

== Content ==
Doc of the Dead looks at the zombie genre in film, literature and pop culture as a whole. Several entertainers from various fields such as film and literature are interviewed on how zombies have changed not only them, but how they entertain others, and how the genre has influenced and had an impact on society at large.

== Cast ==
- Simon Pegg
- George A. Romero
- Bruce Campbell
- Fran Kranz
- Tom Savini
- S.G. Browne
- Greg Nicotero
- Robert Kirkman
- Charlie Adlard
- Max Brooks
- Stuart Gordon
- Alex Cox
- Judith O'Dea
- Russell Streiner
- John Harrison
- John A. Russo
- Joanna Angel
- Mike Stoklasa
- Arnold T. Blumberg

== Reception ==
Doc of the Dead received positive reviews. On the review aggregator website Rotten Tomatoes, 92% of 12 critics' reviews are positive, with an average rating of 6.8/10.

Fearnet praised the film for incorporating as much information as it did, as they felt that it would help the documentary appeal to both audiences familiar and unfamiliar with the zombie genre while alienating neither. In contrast, The Hollywood Reporter remarked that the documentary was an "entertaining but lightweight pop-culture doc". Indiewire commented that Doc of the Dead did have some sections that were "more or less dead on their feet" but that the "slower parts of Doc of the Dead don't diffuse the overall intention of the documentary, which is to celebrate where the zombie came from (the first open grave, if you will), try and gauge its current cultural impact and see how these brain-eating scenarios could play out in real life." The Austin Chronicle expressed a similar opinion in its review, writing, "Though not without its moments (especially the slow-moving vs. fast-moving zombie debate), overall the doc seems rote, running a familiar gamut: history, pop-psych theories, tons of movie clips, etc."
