= Chain Reactions (film) =

2024 documentary film

- Theatrical release poster
- Directed by: Alexandre O. Philippe
- Written by: Alexandre O. Philippe
- Produced by: Kerry Deignan Roy
- Starring: Patton Oswalt; Takashi Miike; Alexandra Heller-Nicholas; Stephen King; Karyn Kusama
- Cinematography: Robert Muratore
- Edited by: David Lawrence
- Music by: Jon Hegel
- Production companies: Exhibit A Pictures; Exurbia Films; Dark Sky Films
- Distributed by: Dark Sky Films
- Release dates: August 29, 2024 (Venice); September 19, 2025 (United States)
- Running time: 102 minutes
- Country: United States
- Languages: English; Japanese

Chain Reactions is a 2024 American documentary film written and directed by Alexandre O. Philippe. It is about the impact the 1974 horror film The Texas Chain Saw Massacre had on five artists, who are Patton Oswalt, Takashi Miike, Alexandra Heller-Nicholas, Stephen King, and Karyn Kusama. Chain Reactions premiered at the 81st Venice International Film Festival in August 2024. It was given a limited theatrical release on September 19, 2025, which was followed by an expansion on September 26.

== Synopsis ==
The film explored the impact and legacy of the 1974 film The Texas Chain Saw Massacre through interviews with five artists, Patton Oswalt, Takashi Miike, Alexandra Heller-Nicholas, Stephen King, and Karyn Kusama.

Chapter One: Patton Oswalt

Chapter Two: Takashi Miike

Chapter Three: Alexandra Heller-Nicholas

Chapter Four: Stephen King

Chapter Five: Karyn Kusama

== Release ==
Chain Reactions premiered at the 81st Venice International Film Festival on August 29, 2024.

It was given a limited theatrical release on September 19, 2025, which was followed by an expansion on September 26th.

== Reception ==
On the review aggregator website Rotten Tomatoes, 98% of 47 critics' reviews are positive, with an average rating of 7.7/10. The website's consensus reads: "Chain Reactions rewards horror fans and cinephiles alike with a thoughtful, unpretentious meditation on the cultural and artistic impact of one of cinema's most influential works."

Christian Zilko of IndieWire gave the film a B and wrote, "Exploration of our inexplicable attraction to horror is the true theme of the brilliantly titled Chain Reactions. Plenty of well-adjusted people have devoted their lives to capturing sadism, abuse, dismemberment, and sin in its many forms in cinema and literature. Using art as an outlet to purge our evil urges in a harmless manner and allow ourselves to live normal lives in polite society is an unambiguously good thing, but Philippe and his subjects are interested in figuring out why we have those urges in the first place."

Alan French of Sunshine State Cineplex gave the film a 7 out of 10 and wrote, "A love letter to an all-time classic, Chain Reactions shines as one of Philippe's most entertaining works. The Texas Chainsaw Massacre remains an integral piece of American cinema. As it turns fifty, there's no doubt it's earned its place in the sun. When creators like these come to prop up a movie's importance, you listen. Chain Reactions only furthers that legacy."
