= Murderer (disambiguation) =

A murderer is a person who murders.

Murderer, Murderers or Murderess may also refer to:

- "The Murderer", a 1953 short story by Ray Bradbury
- The Murderer (novel), a 1978 novel by Roy A. K. Heath
- Murderer (2009 film), a Hong Kong mystery thriller film directed by Roy Chow
- Murderer (2014 film), a South Korean thriller film
- Murderers (film), a 2006 film
- Murderer (play), a 1975 comedy/thriller play written by Anthony Shaffer
- Murderess (film), a 2023 Greek drama film
- Murderess: The Winnie Ruth Judd Story, a 2007 all-puppet film

== Music ==
- "Murderer", a 1995 single by Buju Banton
- "Murderah", a 2001 song by Bizzy Bone, from The Gift
- "Murderers", a 2001 song by John Frusciante, from To Record Only Water for Ten Days
- Murderer (EP), a 2003 extended play and song by Low
- "Murderer", a 2003 song by Krisiun, from Works of Carnage
- "Murderer", a 2012 song by Impending Doom, from Baptized in Filth
- "Murderer", a 2014 song by Avatar, from Hail the Apocalypse
- "Murderer", a 2020 song by Grandson, from I Love You, I'm Trying

== See also ==
- List of types of murder
- Murder (disambiguation)
