= Lynch/Oz =

2022 documentary film

- Theatrical release poster
- Directed by: Alexandre O. Philippe
- Written by: Alexandre O. Philippe
- Produced by: Kerry Deignan Roy
- Cinematography: Robert Muratore
- Edited by: David Lawrence
- Music by: Aaron Lawrence
- Production company: Exhibit A Pictures
- Distributed by: Dogwoof
- Release date: June 9, 2022 (Tribeca)
- Running time: 108 minutes
- Country: United States
- Language: English
- Box office: $68,987

Lynch/Oz is a 2022 American documentary film directed and written by Alexandre O. Philippe that explores the influence of the film The Wizard of Oz (1939) on the American filmmaker David Lynch.

== Synopsis ==
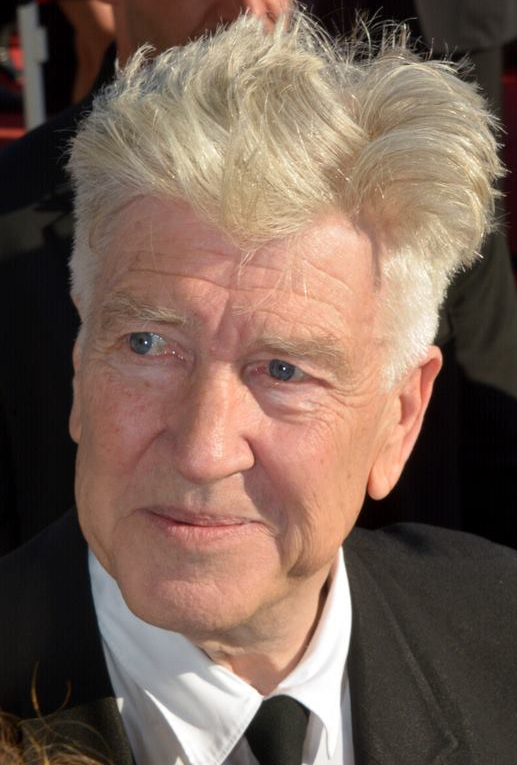
David Lynch in 2017

Lynch/Oz examines the influence of the 1939 Victor Fleming-directed film The Wizard of Oz on the work of American filmmaker David Lynch. The concept for the film originates from a response Lynch gave during a Q&A panel at the 2001 New York Film Festival following a screening of his film Mulholland Drive. When asked about the impact of Fleming's film on his work, Lynch said, "There is not a day that goes by that I don't think about The Wizard of Oz." Lynch/Oz attempts to reevaluate the filmmaker's extended filmography within this enduring influence, from his very first short film, The Alphabet (1969), to his latest series, Twin Peaks: The Return (2017). The film was officially described as an exploration of "one of the most fascinating puzzles in the history of motion pictures: the enduring symbiosis between America's primordial fairytale, The Wizard of Oz, and David Lynch's singular brand of popular surrealism."

The film is divided into six chapters, each narrated by a different filmmaker or critic who provides their own perspectives on the subject. Among the narrators are filmmakers Karyn Kusama (Jennifer's Body), Rodney Ascher (Room 237), and John Waters (Multiple Maniacs, Pink Flamingos, Female Trouble). The film incorporates hundreds of film clips to illustrate the connection between David Lynch and The Wizard of Oz.

== Cast ==
- Amy Nicholson
- Rodney Ascher
- John Waters
- Karyn Kusama
- Justin Benson
- Aaron Moorhead
- David Lowery

== Production ==
A key sequence that bookends the film was shot by Philippe and cinematographer Robert Muratore using a drone in the Central City Opera House in Central City, Colorado.

== Release ==
Lynch/Oz was selected to be screened in the Spotlight Documentary section of the Tribeca Festival, where it had its world premiere on June 9, 2022. Before its premiere, Lynch/Oz was picked up for worldwide release by Dogwoof, a British film distributor specializing in documentaries. The documentary had its UK premiere during the BFI London Film Festival. It received a limited UK theatrical release by Film 4 on December 2, 2022. The film received a limited theatrical release by Janus Films in North America, beginning at New York's IFC Center on June 2, 2023.

=== Home media ===
The film was added to the Criterion Collection in March 2024, and was released on both Blu-ray and DVD.

== Reception ==
=== Critical response ===
On Rotten Tomatoes, the film holds an approval rating of 84% based on 74 reviews, with an average rating of 7.3/10. The website's consensus reads, "Thoughtful and absorbing, Lynch/Oz offers an appropriately unique analysis of one of cinema's most idiosyncratic artists." According to Metacritic, which assigned a weighted average score of 62 out of 100 based on 18 critics, the film received "generally favorable" reviews.

Screen International's Tara Judah wrote, "With its impressive array of hundreds of film clips, frenetic editing and whip-smart narrators, Lynch/Oz offers an exciting prism through which to view Lynch's oeuvre." David Ehrlich of IndieWire wrote, "Lynch/Oz is less compelling for any of its individual theories or observations than for how it frames movies as permeable membranes that flicker between personal obsession and the collective unconscious." Variety's Owen Gleiberman wrote, "Lynch/Oz is bursting with ideas [...] but the movie is too pie-in-the-sky to quite make it over the rainbow."

=== Accolades ===
Accolades for Lynch/Oz
Award	Date of ceremony	Category	Recipient(s)	Result	Ref.
BFI London Film Festival	October 16, 2022	Grierson Award for Best Documentary	Alexandre O. Philippe	Nominated	
Denver Film Festival	November 13, 2022	Maysles Brothers Award for Best Documentary	Alexandre O. Philippe	Nominated	
