= Murda =

Murda may refer to:

- Murda (rapper), Önder Doğan (born 1984), Turkish-Dutch rapper
- "Murda" (song), by Candyland 2015
- "Murda", a song Lil Wayne from Free Weezy Album, 2015
- "Murda", a song by Chancellor and Dok2, 2016
- Murda, a letter form in Javanese script

== See also ==
- Murder
- Mo Murda
