= Kim Novak =

American actress (born 1933)

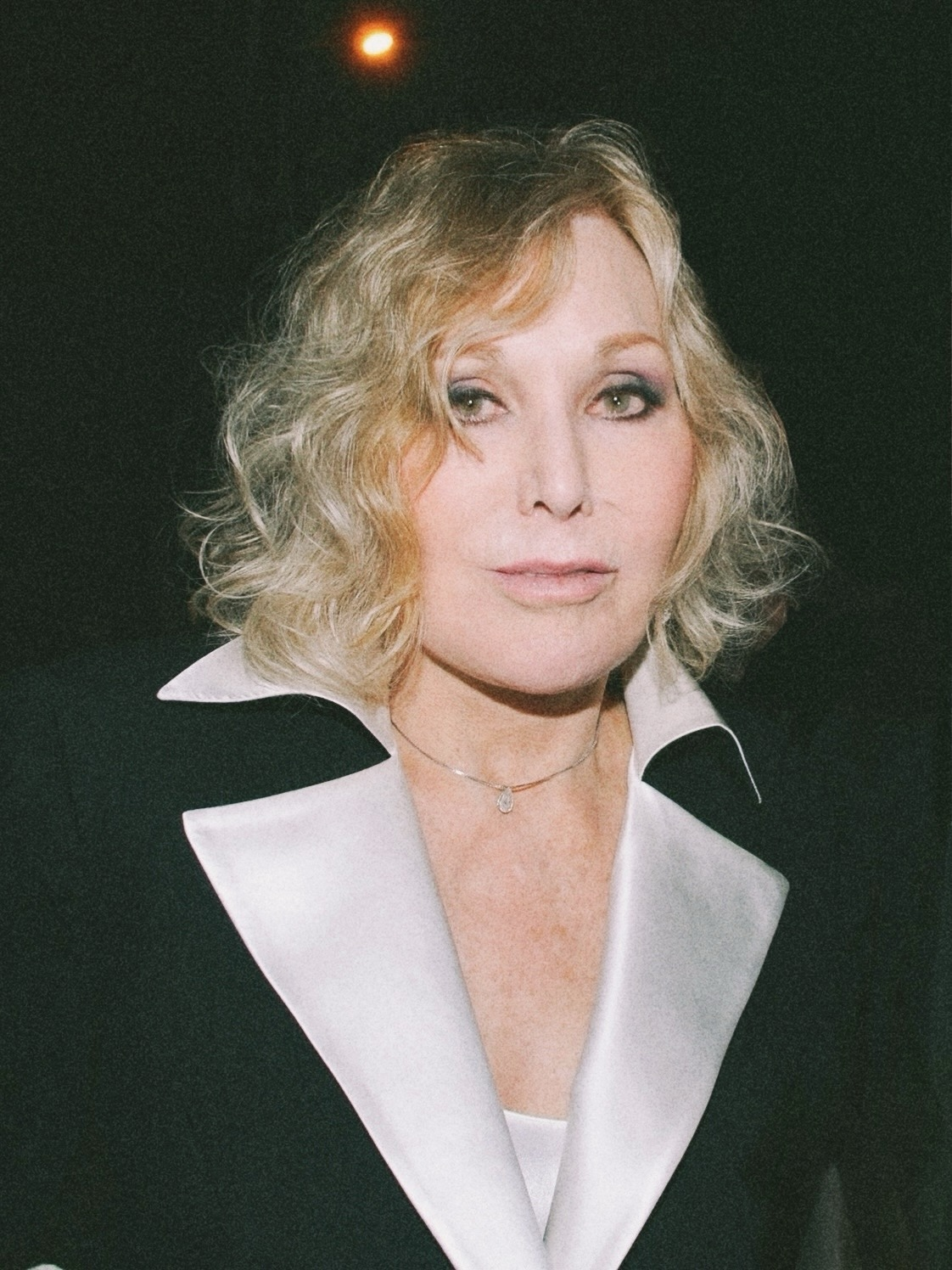
- Novak in 2014
- Born: Marilyn Pauline Novak; February 13, 1933 (age 93); Chicago, Illinois, U.S.
- Education: School of the Art Institute of Chicago
- Occupation: Actress
- Years active: 1954–1991
- Spouses: Richard Johnson (m. 1965; div. 1966) Robert Malloy (m. 1976; died 2020)
- Website: kimnovakartist.com

Marilyn Pauline "Kim" Malloy (née Novak; born February 13, 1933) is a retired American actress. Her contributions to cinema have been honored with two Golden Globe Awards, an Honorary Golden Bear, a Golden Lion for Lifetime Achievement, and a star on the Hollywood Walk of Fame.

Novak began her career in 1954 after signing a contract with Columbia Pictures, and quickly became one of Hollywood's top box office stars, appearing in Picnic (1955), The Man with the Golden Arm (1955), and Pal Joey (1957). She gained prominence for her performance in Alfred Hitchcock's thriller Vertigo (1958), which is recognized as one of the greatest films ever made. Other notable films include Bell, Book and Candle (1958), Strangers When We Meet (1960), and Kiss Me, Stupid (1964).

By 1965 Novak mostly withdrew from acting and has appeared only sporadically in films since, but has studied art and displayed her paintings in major galleries. She appeared in The Mirror Crack'd (1980) and had a regular role on the primetime series Falcon Crest (1986–1987). After a disappointing experience during the filming of Liebestraum (1991), she retired from acting.

== Early life ==
Marilyn Pauline Novak was born in Chicago, Illinois, on February 13, 1933. She is the second daughter of Joseph and Blanche (née Kral) Novak; both appeared with her in the 1962 film The Notorious Landlady. Both of her parents were born in Chicago and were of Czech descent. Joseph (1897–1987) was a history teacher and took a job as a freight dispatcher on the Chicago, Milwaukee and St. Paul Railroad during the Great Depression.

Novak attended William Penn Elementary, Farragut High School, and Wright Junior College, where she carpooled with Frank Studrawa and Joe Tyrner. She won two scholarships to the School of the Art Institute of Chicago.

During the summer break in her last semester of junior college Novak went on a cross-country tour as a promotional model for Detroit Motor Products Corporation's Deepfreeze home freezer at trade shows. Novak was pronounced "Miss Deepfreeze".

== Acting career ==
=== 1953–1958: Early films and breakthrough ===
In San Francisco, after the refrigerator company tour ended, Novak and two other models decided to travel to Los Angeles, to check out the film industry. In Los Angeles, the three, with her as Marilyn Novak, were extras in Son of Sinbad (filmed in 1953, released in 1955), and later, for The French Line (1953), starring Jane Russell at RKO. In Los Angeles, Novak was discovered by an agent, who signed her to a long-term contract with Columbia Pictures. From the beginning of her career, she wanted to be an original and not another stereotype. Therefore, Novak fought with Columbia's CEO, Harry Cohn, over the changing of her name. Cohn suggested the name "Kit Marlowe", arguing, "Nobody's gonna go see a girl with a Polack name!", but Novak insisted on keeping her name, saying, "I'm Czech, but Polish, Czech, no matter, it's my name!" They eventually settled on the name "Kim Novak" as a compromise.

Columbia intended for Novak to be their successor to Rita Hayworth, their biggest star of the 1940s, whose career had declined; also, the studio was hopeful that Novak would bring them the same box-office success Marilyn Monroe brought 20th Century-Fox. Novak's first role for the studio was in the film noir Pushover (1954), in which she received third billing below Fred MacMurray and Philip Carey. She then co-starred in the romantic comedy Phffft (1954) as Janis, a character who finds Robert Tracey (Jack Lemmon) "real cute". Both films were reasonably successful at the box office, and Novak received favorable reviews for her performances. In her third feature film, 5 Against the House (1955), a gritty crime drama, she received second billing after Guy Madison but above Brian Keith, all three above the title. It was only a minor critical and box-office success.

Novak then played Madge Owens in the film version of Picnic (1955), from the William Inge play, co-starring William Holden and Rosalind Russell. Its director, Joshua Logan, felt that it would be more in character for Novak to have red hair; she agreed to wear a red wig during filming. Logan says Harry Cohn suggested Novak appear in the film but did not insist upon it: the director tested her for the role several times and was delighted with her performance, feeling she was close to her character. Picnic was a resounding critical and box-office triumph, and Novak won a Golden Globe Award for Most Promising Newcomer. She was also nominated for the BAFTA Film Award for Best Foreign Actress but did not win. She appeared as a mystery guest on the game show What's My Line? on February 5, 1956, to promote the film's opening at the Radio City Music Hall. Director Otto Preminger then cast her in The Man with the Golden Arm (1955), in which she played Frank Sinatra's sultry ex-girlfriend. In a cast that included Eleanor Parker, Novak received praise for being one of the film's bright spots, and the film was a box-office hit.

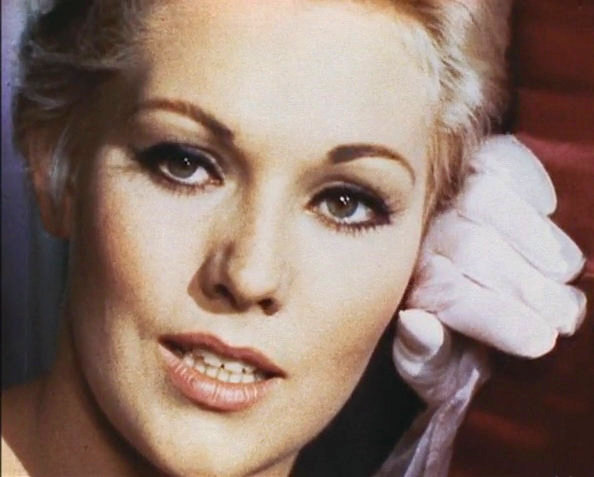
Novak singing "My Funny Valentine" in Pal Joey (1957)

Novak's next project, The Eddy Duchin Story (1956), cast her as Marjorie Oelrichs, the wife of pianist Eddy Duchin, played by Tyrone Power. Because the two leads did not get along during filming, Novak nearly considered backing out of the production but decided against it. At the time of its release, the film was a critical and box-office hit, with many suggesting that Novak's advertisements for No-Cal diet soda contributed positively to the film's success. Offered a choice for her next project, she selected the biopic Jeanne Eagels (1957), in which she portrayed the stage and silent-screen actress who was addicted to heroin. Co-starring Jeff Chandler, the film was a largely fictional account of Eagels' life. The film drew negative reviews but turned a profit at the box office. Eagels' family sued Columbia over the way Eagels had been depicted in the movie.

After appearing in a series of successful movies, Novak became one of the biggest box-office draws of 1957 and 1958. Columbia then placed her in a film adaptation of the musical Pal Joey (also 1957), based on the 1940 novel and Broadway play, both written by John O'Hara. Playing Linda English, a naive showgirl, she co-starred opposite Frank Sinatra (again) and Rita Hayworth. Released in October, the film received favorable reviews; Variety called the film "strong, funny entertainment," although Novak's performance has generated a mixed reaction, partly because of noticeable lack of on-screen charisma. The movie was a box-office hit and has been considered one of Novak's better performances.

=== 1958: Vertigo ===
Director Alfred Hitchcock was working on his next film, Vertigo (1958), when his leading actress, Vera Miles, became pregnant and had to withdraw from the complex roles of Madeleine Elster and Judy Barton. Hitchcock approached Harry Cohn to offer Novak the female lead without even requesting a screen test. Though Cohn hated the script, he allowed Novak to read it because he considered Hitchcock to be a great director. Novak loved it, as she could identify with the character, and agreed to take part in the film without meeting Hitchcock. At the same time she was striking for more money from Columbia and refused to show up for work on the set to protest against her salary of $1,250 a week. Novak hired new agents to represent her and demanded an adjustment in her contract. Cohn, who was paid $250,000 for Novak to do Vertigo, suspended her, but after a few weeks of negotiations he relented and offered her a new contract. She received a raise to $3,000 a week and told the press, "I don't like to have anyone take advantage of me."

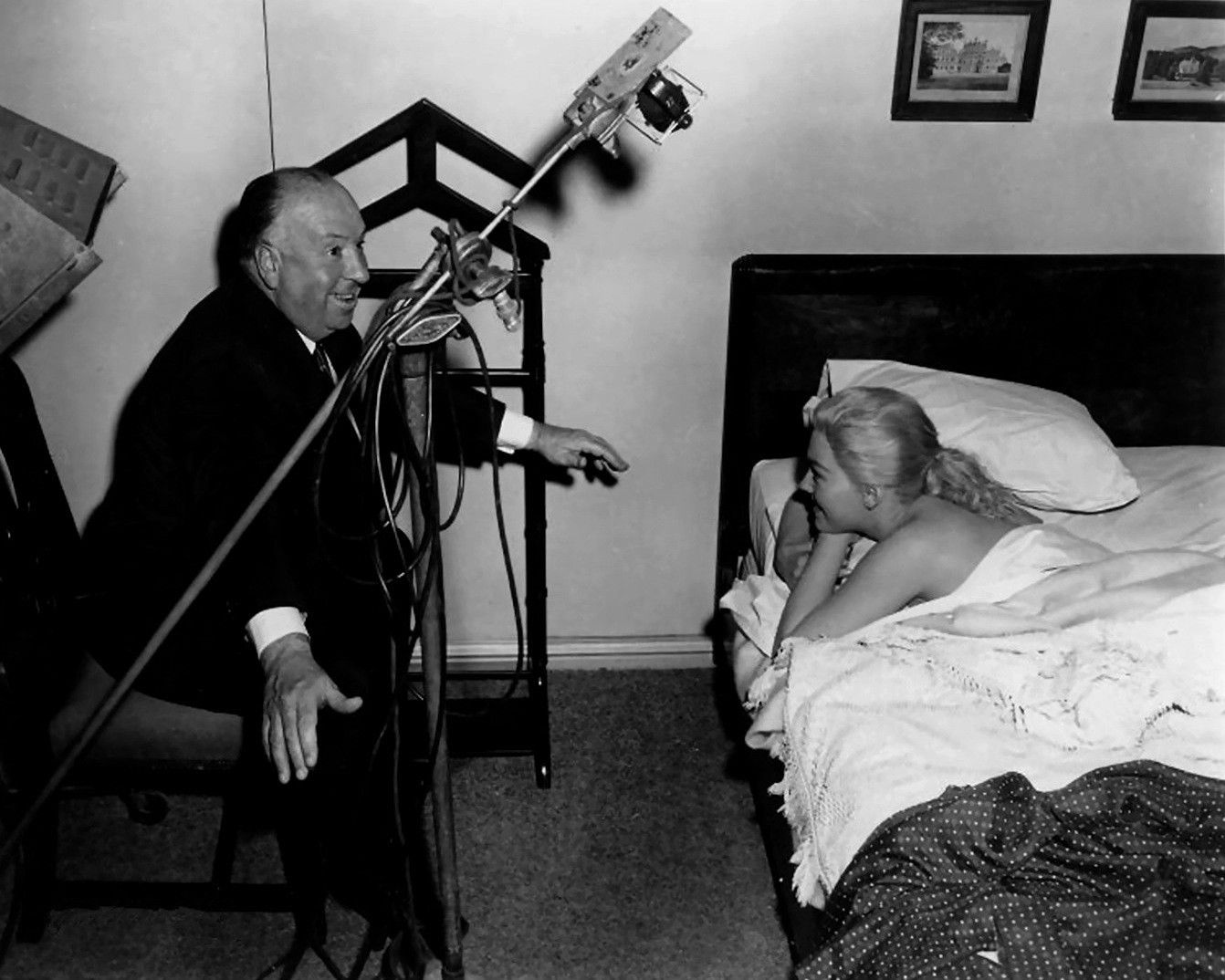
Alfred Hitchcock with Novak on the set of Vertigo (1958)

Novak finally reported for work, and according to Hitchcock she had "all sorts of preconceived notions" about her character, including what she would and would not wear. Before shooting began she told the director she did not like the grey suit and black shoes she was slated to wear, thinking them too heavy and stiff for her character. Novak later recalled, "I didn't think it would matter to him what kind of shoes I wore. I had never had a director who was particular about the costumes, the way they were designed, the specific colors. The two things he wanted the most were those shoes and that gray suit." Indeed, Hitchcock explained to Novak that the visual aspect of the film was even more important to him than the story and insisted on her wearing the suit and the shoes that he had been planning for several months. Novak learned to make it work for her, as she saw it as a symbol of her character. Nonetheless, Hitchcock allowed Novak the freedom to develop the character herself. As she later recalled: "It excites me to work on dual personalities because I think I have many myself. And I think that I was able to use so much of me in that movie. At first I was feeling insecure because I kept saying, "Is this right? How do you want me to play this character?" Hitchcock said: "I hired you and that's who I want, what you bring to this role. But what I do expect from you is to stand where I want you to, wear what I want you to and speak in the rhythm that I want you to." And he worked a long time with me to try to get the right rhythm." The role took on a personal significance for her, as she felt she went through the same thing as her character when she arrived in Hollywood:

From my point of view, when I first read those lines where she says, "I want you to love me for me," and all the talking in that scene, I just identified with it so much because going to Hollywood as a young girl and suddenly finding they want to make you over totally, it's such a total change and it was like I was always fighting to show some of myself, feeling that I wanted to be there as well. It was like they'd do my hair and go and redo a bunch of things. So I really identified with the fact of someone that was being made over with the resentment, with wanting to. Needing approval and wanting to be loved and willing, eventually, to go to any lengths to get that by changing her hair and all of these different things. And then when Judy appears, it's another story and then when she has to go through that change. I really identified with the movie because it was saying, "Please, see who I am. Fall in love with me."

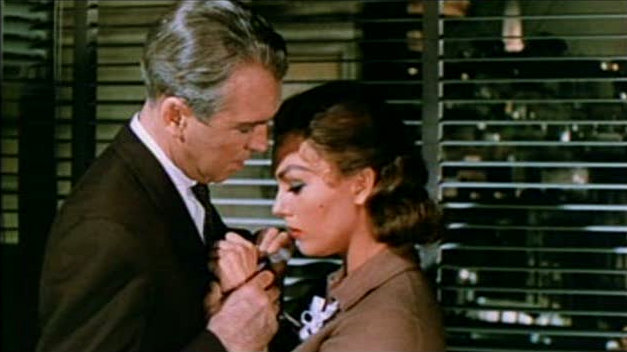
James Stewart with Novak in Vertigo

Novak described Hitchcock as a gentleman but found the experience of working with him to be strange. "I don't know if he ever liked me. I never sat down with him for dinner or tea or anything, except one cast dinner, and I was late to that. It wasn't my fault, but I think he thought I had delayed to make a star entrance, and he held that against me. During the shooting, he never really told me what he was thinking." The director was actually frustrated to have her instead of Vera Miles, as Novak learned later. "Hitchcock didn't like having me in his picture and he felt I was ruining it. It was only after the film was finished that I heard how much he thought I'd wrecked his picture. I felt I did a lot of good work in that movie, and I got some of the best notices of my career. But Hitchcock couldn't blame himself, so he blamed me." Novak got along well with her co-star, James Stewart, who supported her during the filming of the movie. "He treated me so well. I learned a lot about acting from him. When we had emotional scenes, he had to prepare himself first by somehow going deep inside of himself, and you knew to leave him alone when he was like that. And when it was over, he wouldn't just walk away. He allowed himself to slowly come out of it. He'd hold my hand and I would squeeze his hand so that we both had time to come down from the emotion."

The film had mixed reviews at the time of its release and broke even at the box office, but has since been re-evaluated and is widely considered one of the director's best works. In the 2012 British Film Institute's Sight & Sound critics' poll, Vertigo was voted as the best film of all time. Novak surprised film critics. Bosley Crowther, writing for The New York Times, described her as "really quite amazing", and the Variety review noted that she was "interesting under Hitchcock's direction" and "nearer an actress than she was in either Pal Joey or Jeanne Eagels." Film critic David Thomson thought it was "one of the major female performances in the cinema" and film director Martin Scorsese called it "extraordinary", adding that Novak's work was "so brave and emotionally immediate". However, Novak was disappointed by her performance when she watched the film in 2013. "I was really disappointed. Both characters were exaggerated. They'll always remember me in Vertigo, and I'm not that good in it, but I don't blame me because there are a couple of scenes where I was wonderful."

=== 1958–1965: Decline and independent ventures ===
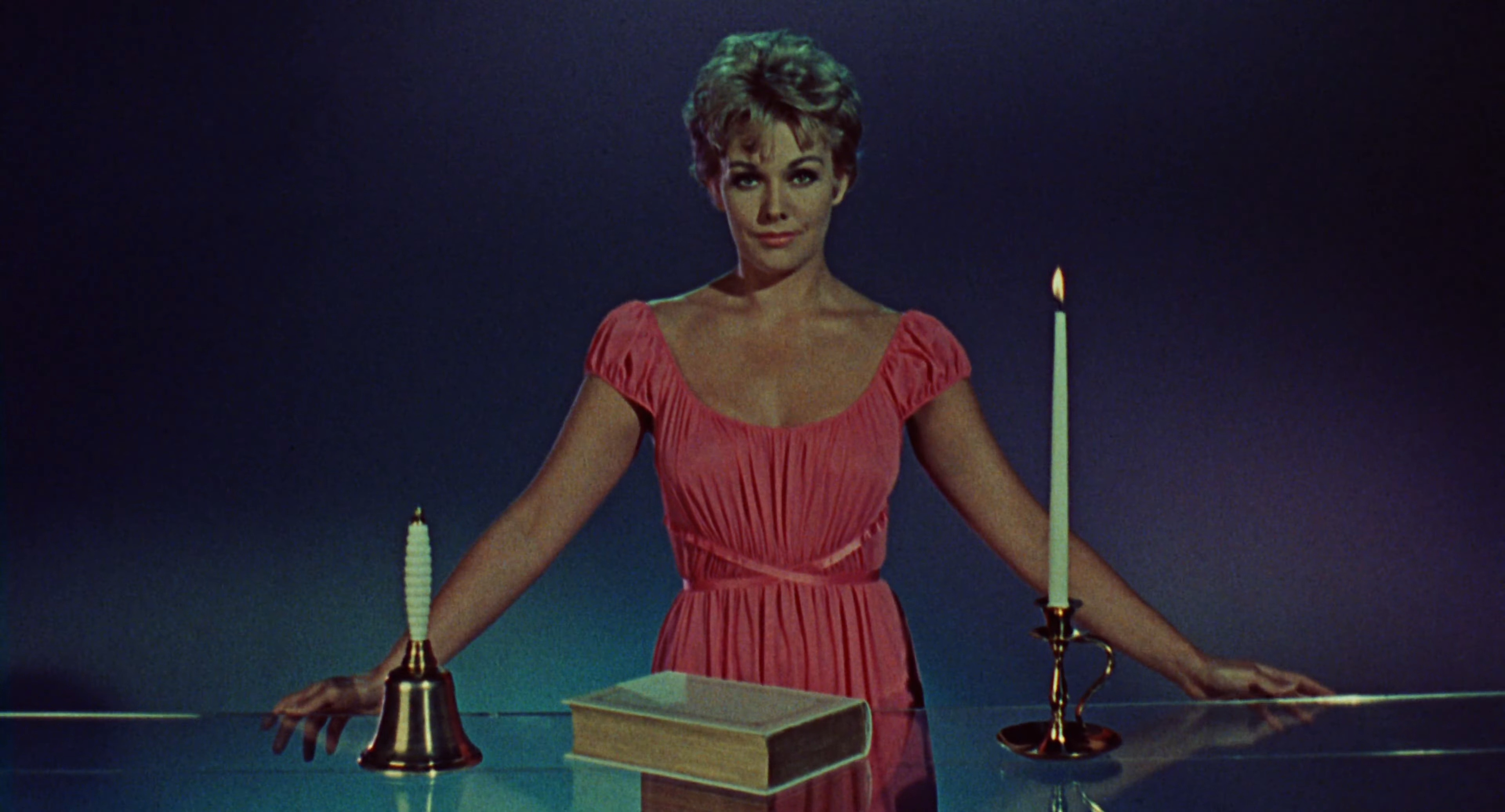
Novak in the trailer in Bell, Book and Candle (1958)

Novak again worked with Stewart in Richard Quine's Bell, Book and Candle (also 1958), a comedy tale of modern-day witchcraft also starring Jack Lemmon and Ernie Kovacs that proved to be a box-office success. She then starred opposite Fredric March in the acclaimed romantic drama Middle of the Night (1959), which she has described as not only her favorite of her films, but also cites her performance in the film as her best.

Novak starred opposite Kirk Douglas in the romantic drama Strangers When We Meet (1960), which drew mixed reviews but was a success financially. Richard Quine was the director, as well as her fiancé at the time. The studio planned to give them the house that was built as part of the storyline during the filming as a wedding gift, but their wedding never occurred. Instead, during the last film that Quine and she made together, the British mystery/comedy The Notorious Landlady (1962) with Jack Lemmon and Fred Astaire, she discovered and purchased her future home by the sea near Big Sur in central California. It became her retreat and sanctuary after leaving Hollywood.

Novak made an independent five-picture deal, with producer Martin Ransohoff and Filmways Pictures to co-produce, but it proved to be a bad choice owing to clashes with personalities over scripts. Their first endeavor, the comedy Boys' Night Out (1962), was unsuccessful. After her Hollywood house survived the big Bel Air Fire of 1961, it was finally lost a few years later when it was swept away with most of her belongings in a mudslide in 1966. During the interim, she made W. Somerset Maugham's drama Of Human Bondage (1964) with Laurence Harvey in Ireland. This third film adaptation of the famous story went over schedule and budget, and it also failed.

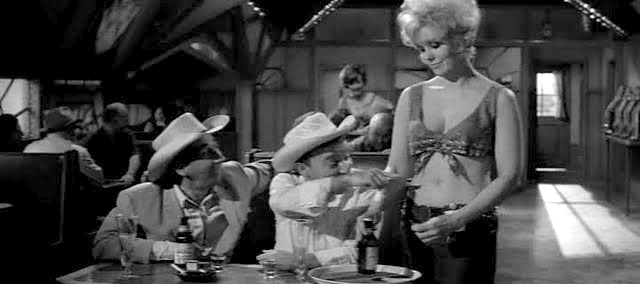
Novak in the trailer for Kiss Me, Stupid (1964)

The sex comedy Kiss Me, Stupid (1964) with Dean Martin followed for director Billy Wilder. Actor Peter Sellers had originally been selected and begun filming, but he had suffered a heart attack, so Ray Walston substituted at the last minute. The film had problems getting released because of conflicts with the Legion of Decency. The film opened to scathing reviews and while it made money, it did not help Novak's career. Years later it was rediscovered and acclaimed for its forward thinking and got rave reviews, particularly for Novak's performance as "Polly the Pistol".

Novak starred in the historical comedy The Amorous Adventures of Moll Flanders (1965) in England with British actor Richard Johnson. Inspired by the similar movie Tom Jones, it drew negative reviews but was a moderate success at the box office. Novak married Johnson in 1965 and divorced him in the spring of 1966. The divorce was amicable and they remained friendly.

In 1965, Novak was cast as the female lead in the occult-themed mystery Eye of the Devil, co-starring David Niven, Donald Pleasence and Sharon Tate. The film's premise intrigued Novak, but she found the filming difficult and unpleasant. Novak was forced to leave the film after she fell off a horse, resulting in serious injuries which took time to recover from and she was replaced by Deborah Kerr.

=== 1966–1991: Later work ===
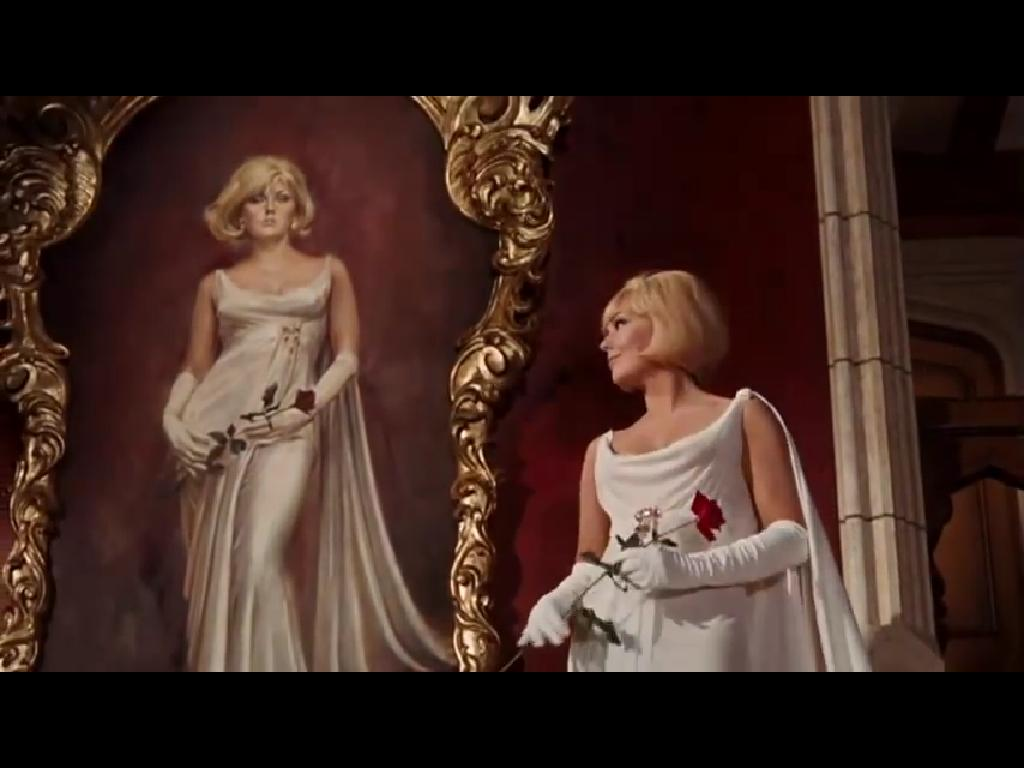
Novak in The Legend of Lylah Clare (1968)

By the end of 1966, Novak was emotionally drained and no longer wanted to live the life of a Hollywood movie star in the glare of the spotlight with the press scrutinizing her every move. When a mudslide took her Bel Air home and cost her entire life's savings in bulldozer fees, she moved away from Hollywood to Big Sur. From then on, acting became a job and was no longer a career of choice. Novak preferred to concentrate on her first love, the visual arts, often writing poetry to accompany her paintings, and even writing some song lyrics. Harry Belafonte and the Kingston Trio recorded some of her folk songs in the 1960s.

Novak returned to the screen for The Legend of Lylah Clare (1968), starring Peter Finch and Ernest Borgnine, and directed by Robert Aldrich. She played a dual role, portraying a person who becomes possessed by a look-alike film actress who gets made over by her obsessive-compulsive director lover. Robert Aldrich asked Novak to do a German accent for that role, but she felt it was unbelievable and over the top, so she did not want to do it, and he never insisted. At the premiere, Novak was shocked to hear her voice had been dubbed by a German actress in many scenes. Aldrich had never told her, nor had he given her the opportunity to dub it herself. The film was aggressively scorned by critics and Novak drew some of the worst reviews of her career. It was also a box office disaster. She was extremely upset and regretted having starred in the film. The last film Novak made in the '60s was the Western comedy The Great Bank Robbery (1969), opposite Zero Mostel, Clint Walker, and Claude Akins.

After nearly four years that she described as a "self-imposed vacation", Novak agreed to take part in two projects. She returned to the screen with a role in the horror anthology film Tales That Witness Madness (1973). Novak also starred as Las Vegas chorus girl Gloria Joyce, a character with whom she could identify, in the made-for-TV movie, The Third Girl From the Left (1973), with her real-life boyfriend at the time, Michael Brandon. Novak admitted a preference for TV films as she thought they were faster to shoot than features. She described movie scripts of that time as offensive, saying she disliked the unnecessary sex she found in most of them. In 1975, Novak took part in the ABC movie Satan's Triangle because she was intrigued by the story, which dealt in the supernatural. Novak had a small role in The White Buffalo (1977), a Western starring Charles Bronson, and she ended the decade by playing Helga in Just a Gigolo (1979), opposite David Bowie. Both films were flops, but Novak was not blamed due to her minor roles in them.

In 1980, Novak played fictional actress Lola Brewster in the British mystery-thriller The Mirror Crack'd, based on the story by Agatha Christie. She co-starred alongside Angela Lansbury, Tony Curtis, Rock Hudson, and Elizabeth Taylor. She enjoyed making the film and got along with her co-stars and the film was moderately successful. Novak did not appear in any feature films during the remainder of the 1980s. Her acting credits during the decade included the ensemble television movie Malibu (1983) and the pilot episode of The New Alfred Hitchcock Presents (1985). Producers of the successful primetime soap opera Falcon Crest offered Novak a role in their series similar to her character in Vertigo. She appeared as the secretive "Kit Marlowe" in 19 episodes from 1986 to 1987. It was Novak's idea to name her character Kit Marlowe, as it was the stage name that Columbia had wanted her to use when she started in the business. The former Marilyn Pauline Novak wryly described this turn of events as effectively being Cohn's revenge on her from beyond the grave.

In 1989, Novak appeared along with James Stewart as a presenter at the 61st Academy Awards. Asked in the press room about a possible comeback, Novak said that if someone sent her a script she really wanted to do, with a part she felt she could not turn down, she would be happy to go back to work on the big or little screen. At the same time, Novak turned down plenty of offers for movies, as well as an opportunity to appear in a second season of Falcon Crest, to write her autobiography, tentatively titled Through My Eyes. Novak decided to re-establish contact with her agent and seek challenging roles after she realized she was not satisfied artistically. She said at the time, "I feel that I didn't live up to what I should have done with it. In other words, I'm glad I made the move away from Hollywood: I don't regret that. I know that was a major thing and a good thing. But by the same token, it was like unfinished business." She returned to film with the leading role of Rose Sellers in the drama The Children (1990) opposite Ben Kingsley and Britt Eckland. A British-German coproduction based on an Edith Wharton novel, the film premiered at the London Film Festival and received good reviews. Leonard Maltin praised the acting and felt Novak's performance was "excellent". However, following disputes between the director Tony Palmer and the distributor over editing and music, the film was pulled from release and never distributed.

Director Mike Figgis offered Novak the role of a terminally ill writer with a mysterious past in his thriller Liebestraum (1991) opposite Kevin Anderson and Bill Pullman. Novak loved the script and thought it was going to be an important picture. However, her collaboration with Figgis was tense and the two had conflicts from the beginning. Novak agreed to do the film under the impression she was going to play the whole character, but Figgis felt she was unable to play the flashback role the way he wanted, and hired actress Sarah Fearon for those scenes. The two clashed on the set, as their visions of the script differed and were in many ways diametrically opposed. Although she considered him to be a brilliant director, she felt the story was too personal for him, as it was about his own life, and Novak was playing his mother. She was also unhappy, as she felt he wanted her to act like a puppet. "He wanted what he thought Hitchcock had made over. But Hitchcock didn't do that. Figgis didn't know Hitchcock. So he treated me the way he thought Hitchcock must have, tried to manipulate me into doing exactly... I went crazy." Novak later said she was hurt and distraught, as "It was such a painful thing for me because it took me right back to Harry Cohn and all that time. And back into saying, Look, for God's sake, haven't you heard it enough? We don't want you to do anything. Just be 'Kim Novak.' That movie pained me more than any movie in the world could do." Novak later told Movieline in 2005 she felt she had been "unprofessional" not to obey her director. "I know he thinks I'm a total bitch. That role was fabulous, full of depth. When I interpreted it the way I thought was evident in the incredible script, he said, 'We're not making a Kim Novak movie, just say the lines. If you continue to play the role this way, I'm going to cut you out of the movie,' and he pretty much did that."

Novak was supposed to do a comedy with the French director Claude Berri, also starring Peter Falk, and a remake of Bell, Book and Candle with Sharon Stone. Neither film was made, and following the difficult experience with Liebestraum, she has usually cited that experience as the reason for her decision to retire from the film industry. In 2004, she told the Associated Press:

I got so burned out on that picture that I wanted to leave the business, but then if you wait long enough you think, "Oh, I miss certain things." The making of a movie is wonderful. What's difficult is afterward when you have to go around and try to sell it. The actual filming, when you have a good script—which isn't often—nothing beats it.

=== 1992–present: Retirement ===
After her retirement from acting, Novak made only rare public appearances and turned down most offers she received. In 1996, Vertigo was given a restoration by Robert A. Harris and James C. Katz and re-released to theaters. Novak enjoyed their work so much, she agreed to make appearances at screenings of the film, something she had refused when Universal asked her in 1984. She also took part in Obsessed with Vertigo, a documentary retracing the making and restoration of the film. In 1997, Novak received an Honorary Golden Bear Award for lifetime achievement at the 47th Berlin International Film Festival.

In 2003, Novak was presented with the Eastman Kodak Archives Award for her major contribution to film. Prior honorees include Greta Garbo, Audrey Hepburn, James Stewart, Martin Scorsese, and Meryl Streep. During that time, Novak received several offers to do some major films and to appear on high-profile television shows. She made an appearance on Larry King Live in 2004, where she stated she would consider returning to the screen "if it was the right role." In 2010, Novak was the recipient of a special tribute from the American Cinematheque in Hollywood, where her films were shown at Grauman's Egyptian Theatre. She made a rare personal appearance with a Q&A onstage between a showing of Pal Joey and Bell, Book and Candle, earning a two-minute-long standing ovation upon her entrance.

In April 2012, Novak was honored at the TCM Classic Film Festival, where she introduced a screening of Vertigo. She joined in conversation with Robert Osborne for a Q&A session in which she discussed her career and personal life. The hour-long interview aired on TCM as Kim Novak: Live from the TCM Classic Film Festival on March 6, 2013. Novak broke down in tears while discussing Liebestraum. As she nearly sobbed in front of the audience, Novak said, "I couldn't do a movie after that. I've never done a movie after that. I just couldn't do a movie after that."

The interview was an eye-opener for many fans who had wondered why Novak made so few films. Acknowledging that she never reached her potential as an actress, Novak revealed to the audience that she was bipolar and explained, "I was not diagnosed until much later. I go through more of the depression than the mania part." "I don't think I was ever cut out to have a Hollywood life," Novak also commented. "Did I do the right thing, leaving? Did I walk out when I shouldn't have? That's when I get sad."

On the possibility of acting again, Novak said in another interview, with the fashion website LifeGoesStrong, "Who knows what the future holds? It would take an awful lot to lure me out there, but I would never say never." Also during the TCM Festival, Novak was honored in a handprint and footprint ceremony at Grauman's Chinese Theatre. That same year, Novak received the San Francisco Cinematic Icon Award from the San Francisco Museum and Historical Society.

After years of seclusion, Novak started to make public appearances more frequently as she felt her body of work was being more appreciated. In 2013, she was recognized as the guest of honor by the Cannes Film Festival and attended the 2013 Festival, where she introduced a new restored version of Vertigo. She also took part in the festival's closing ceremony as a presenter, earning a standing ovation upon her entrance. In 2014, she was a presenter at the 86th Academy Awards. That same year, she appeared at the TCM Classic Film Festival, where she unveiled her painting Vertigo / Vortex of Delusion commissioned by the TCM network as part of their 20th anniversary. Novak also introduced a screening of her 1958 movie, Bell Book and Candle, during the Festival. Also in 2014, Novak was invited by Cunard Line to be a speaker on board during a New York-to-London cruise on RMS Queen Mary 2. She introduced screenings of Vertigo and Bell, Book and Candle, and did a Q&A session with Hollywood expert Sue Cameron, who is also her manager. That same year, Novak appeared with both of her art mentors, Harley Brown and Richard McKinley, for a solo show of her paintings at the Butler Institute of American Art.

In 2015, Novak attended the 22nd Febiofest international film festival, where she received the Kristián Award for her contribution to world cinema and also had an exhibition of her paintings at the Strahov Monastery. She hosted special screenings of Vertigo featuring live performances of Bernard Herrmann's score by members of the Toronto Symphony Orchestra at the 2015 Toronto International Film Festival and by members of the San Francisco Symphony at the Louise M. Davies Symphony Hall in 2016. Also in 2016, Novak was invited by Turner Classic Movies to be a guest on their Caribbean Cruise where she sold five of her paintings and was able to raise nearly $7,000 for the prevention of teenage suicide with the auction of a framed giclée of her.

In 2018, Novak joined in conversation with Larry King for a Q&A session at the Grauman's Egyptian Theatre, in celebration of Vertigo's 60th Anniversary. That same year, she was the recipient of a special sold-out tribute from the Castro Theatre.

In 2020, Novak gave a rare interview for CBS News Sunday Morning. That same year, she appeared in the first documentary devoted to her, Kim Novak : The Golden Age Rebel.

In 2024, American actress Sydney Sweeney was cast as Novak in Scandalous!, directed by Colman Domingo, which would recount her relationship with singer-actor Sammy Davis Jr. In 2026, Novak disapproved the casting, stating "Sweeney looks sexy all the time" and "[she] sticks out so much above the waist", and expressed concerns the film would focus solely on the sexual side of her and Davis' relationship.

In 2025, Novak received the Golden Lion for Lifetime Achievement at the Venice Film Festival, where she also presented a new documentary about her, Kim Novak's Vertigo, directed by Alexandre O. Philippe.

== Honors ==
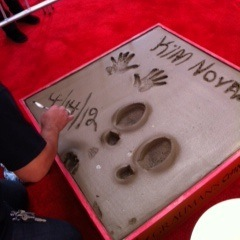
Novak was honored in a handprint and footprint ceremony at Grauman's Chinese Theatre in 2012.

In 1955, Novak won the Golden Globe Award for Most Promising Newcomer – Female. Two years later she won another Golden Globe for World Favorite Female Actress. On February 8, 1960, Novak was awarded a star on the Hollywood Walk of Fame, at 6332 Hollywood Boulevard. In 1995, Novak was ranked 92nd by Empire Magazine on a list of the 100 sexiest stars in film history. Novak was honored with a Golden Bear for Lifetime Achievement at the 47th Berlin International Film Festival in 1997 and was presented with the Eastman Kodak Archives Award for her major contribution to film in 2003. In 2012, Novak was honored in a handprint and footprint ceremony at Grauman's Chinese Theatre. That same year, she received the S.F. Cinematic Icon Award from the San Francisco Museum and Historical Society for her screen contributions in San Francisco with Pal Joey and Vertigo. Her contribution to world cinema was also rewarded with the Kristián Award she was given at the 22nd Febiofest international film festival in 2015.

Novak's work influenced both actors and fashion designers. Naomi Watts stated that her character interpretation in Mulholland Drive (2001) was influenced by the look and performances of Novak in Vertigo. Renée Zellweger said that Novak was "pure magic" and dressed up as her character from Vertigo for a photo shoot for the March 2008 issue of Vanity Fair. Nicole Kidman wrote Novak a letter saying she was "an inspiration to me and to women everywhere. Your cinematic body of work speaks for yourself, but so does the other side of Kim Novak – the free spirit who left Hollywood to live atop the hills of Big Sur. Kim Novak the painter and llama farmer. You are an icon whose screen presence is unmatched, and yet you've lived your life with dignity and authenticity, and the courage to follow your heart wherever it takes you." In 2005, British fashion designer Alexander McQueen named his first It Bag The Novak, saying, "I'm drawn to Kim Novak in the same way that Hitchcock was. She had an air of uptightness you wouldn't want to cross."

== Personal life ==
In the mid-1950s, Novak had relationships with Ramfis Trujillo, son of Dominican dictator Rafael Trujillo, and in 1957 with actor Sammy Davis Jr., who was African American. According to a BBC documentary, in order to force an end to her relationship with a Black man, Columbia Pictures chief Harry Cohn had mobsters threaten Davis with blinding of his one remaining eye, or having his legs broken, if he did not marry a Black woman within 48 hours. Novak also dated Michael Brandon, Wilt Chamberlain, and David Hemmings. She was engaged to director Richard Quine in 1959. Novak's first marriage was to English actor Richard Johnson from March 15, 1965, to May 26, 1966. The two remained friends afterward.

In 1966, Novak left Hollywood for Big Sur, where she raised horses and painted, making an occasional film. In 1974, she met her second husband, equine veterinarian Robert Malloy, when he made a house call after one of her Arabian mares suffered colic. They married on March 12, 1976. As a result of her marriage, she has two adult stepchildren. The couple built a log home along the Williamson River near Chiloquin, Oregon. Malloy died on November 27, 2020.

In 1997, Novak and Malloy bought a 43-acre ranch in Sams Valley, Oregon, which the couple made into their home. Novak took pastel classes with artists Harley Brown and Richard McKinley. In July 2000, when her home burned down, she lost all her art and the only draft of the autobiography she had been working on for 10 years. In 2006, Novak was injured in a horse-riding accident. She suffered a punctured lung, broken ribs, and nerve damage, but made a full recovery within a year.

In October 2010, her manager, Sue Cameron, reported that Novak had been diagnosed with breast cancer, but was undergoing treatment and doctors said that she is in fantastic physical shape. She made a full recovery.

In 2014, after Novak's rare public appearance at the 86th Academy Awards, the media speculated that she had undergone cosmetic surgery. Novak, upset by these remarks, wrote an open letter responding to these Oscar-night "bullies". Novak admitted that she "had fat injections in my face" which seemed less invasive than a face-lift, but later regretted it.

Novak continued her creative endeavors as a photographer, poet, and visual artist painting in watercolor, oil, and pastel. Her paintings are impressionistic and surrealistic. The Butler Institute of American Art in Youngstown, Ohio hosted a retrospective of her work from June until October 2019. Novak was present at the opening on June 16. In 2021, Butler's also published a book with a selection of her paintings titled Kim Novak: Her Art and Life. More recent artworks were on exhibit from June through August 2024 at the Butler Institute. On June 6, 2024, she was, again, present at the opening of this exhibition.

== Filmography ==
Film
Year	Title	Role	Notes
1954	The French Line	Model	Uncredited
1954	Pushover	Lona McLane	
1954	Phffft	Janis	
1955	Son of Sinbad	Harem Girl	Uncredited
1955	5 Against the House	Kay Greylek	
1955	Picnic	Marjorie "Madge" Owens	
1955	The Man with the Golden Arm	Molly Novotny	
1956	The Eddy Duchin Story	Marjorie Oelrichs	
1957	Jeanne Eagels	Jeanne Eagels	
1957	Pal Joey	Linda English	
1958	Vertigo	Judy Barton / Madeleine Elster	
1958	Bell, Book and Candle	Gillian "Gil" Holroyd	
1959	Middle of the Night	Betty Preisser	
1960	Strangers When We Meet	Margaret "Maggie" Gault	
1960	Pepe	Herself	Cameo
1962	The Notorious Landlady	Mrs. Carlyle "Carly" Hardwicke	
1962	Boys' Night Out	Cathy	
1964	Of Human Bondage	Mildred Rogers	
1964	Kiss Me, Stupid	Polly the Pistol	
1965	The Amorous Adventures of Moll Flanders	Moll Flanders	
1968	The Legend of Lylah Clare	Lylah Clare/Elsa Brinkmann/Elsa Campbell	
1969	The Great Bank Robbery	Sister Lyda Kebanov	
1973	Tales That Witness Madness	Auriol Pageant	Segment #4 "Luau"
1973	The Third Girl from the Left	Gloria Joyce	Television film
1975	Satan's Triangle	Eva	Television film
1977	The White Buffalo	Mrs. Poker Jenny Schermerhorn	Alternative title: Hunt to Kill
1979	Just a Gigolo	Helga von Kaiserling	
1980	The Mirror Crack'd	Lola Brewster	
1983	Malibu	Billie Farnsworth	Television film
1990	The Children	Rose Sellars	
1991	Liebestraum	Lillian Anderson Munnsen	As of November 2025, final appearance in a fictional film
2025	Kim Novak's Vertigo	Herself	Documentary film

== Awards and nominations ==
Year	Award	Category	Title of work	Result
1955	Golden Globe Award	Most Promising Newcomer - Female	Phffft	Won
1956	Photoplay Awards	Most Popular Female Star	—N/a	Won
1957	Golden Globe Award	World Film Favorite - Female	—N/a	Won
1957	BAFTA Awards	Best Foreign Actress	Picnic	Nominated
1957	Golden Apple Award	Most Cooperative Actress	—N/a	Won
1960	Hollywood Walk of Fame	Motion Picture Star	—N/a	Won
1958	Laurel Awards	Top Female Star	—N/a	3rd place
1959	Laurel Awards	Top Female Star	—N/a	12th place
1960	Laurel Awards	Top Female Star	—N/a	8th place
1961	Laurel Awards	Top Female Star	—N/a	6th place
1962	Laurel Awards	Top Female Star	—N/a	13th place
1963	Laurel Awards	Top Female Star	—N/a	11th place
1997	47th Berlin International Film Festival	Honorary Golden Bear	—N/a	Won
2003	George Eastman Museum	George Eastman Award	—N/a	Won
2012	San Francisco Museum and Historical Society	S.F. Cinematic Icon Award	—N/a	Won
2015	Febiofest	Kristián Award	—N/a	Won
2025	82nd Venice International Film Festival	Golden Lion for Lifetime Achievement	—N/a	Won

== See also ==
- Controversy about Novak's The Artist ad in Variety
