= Tonight for Sure =

1962 film by Francis Ford Coppola

- Film poster
- Directed by: Francis Ford Coppola; Jerry Schafer
- Written by: Francis Ford Coppola; Jerry Schafer
- Produced by: Francis Ford Coppola
- Starring: Don Kenney; Karl Schanzer
- Cinematography: Jack Hill
- Edited by: Ronald Waller
- Music by: Carmine Coppola
- Color process: Eastmancolor
- Production company: Searchlight Productions
- Distributed by: Premier Pictures
- Release date: October 25, 1962 (Los Angeles)
- Running time: 69 minutes
- Country: United States
- Language: English

Tonight for Sure is a 1962 American sexploitation comedy film directed by Francis Ford Coppola and Jerry Schafer. It was Coppola's feature directorial debut and combined two existing projects: an unreleased Western-themed nudie cutie directed by Schafer called The Wide Open Spaces and a short film directed by Coppola called The Peeper. The cast features Playboy cover girl Marli Renfro. The score was composed by Coppola's father Carmine Coppola and the cinematography by Jack Hill.

== Plot ==
On the Sunset Strip, two unlikely men rendezvous: Samuel Hill, an unkempt desert miner, and Benjamin Jabowski, a John Birch Society dandy from the city. Intent on some sort of mayhem, they enter the Herald Club before the burlesque show starts, and they wire something to the electrical box, set to blow at midnight. They sit at the back of the club to get to know each other. As they drink and glance at the stage, Sam tells of a partner driven mad by visions of naked women in the sagebrush; Ben tells a tale of trying to rid his neighborhood of a pin-up studio. As they get drunker and the clock ticks toward midnight, they pull their chairs closer to the women on stage.

== Cast ==
- Karl Schanzer as Benjamin Jabowski
- Don Kenney as Samuel Hill
- Marli Renfro as Lucy Mae
- Virginia Gordon
- Barbara Martin
- Linda Gibson
- Sandy Silver
- Pat Brooks
- Electra
- Exotica
- Laura Cornell
- Karen Lee
- Sue Martin
- Marcelino Espinosa
- Anita Danchick

*Linda Lightfoot

- Bill Freed

== See also ==
- List of American films of 1962
- The Party at Kitty and Stud's, the debut of Sylvester Stallone
- Sugar Cookies, a film produced by Oliver Stone
- Caligula, with Malcolm McDowell, Peter O'Toole, John Gielgud and Helen Mirren
- Abel Ferrara, former pornographic film director
- Jerry Stahl, former pornographic screenwriter
