= The People vs. George Lucas =

- Directed by: Alexandre O. Philippe
- Produced by: Anna Higgs; Robert Muratore; Vanessa Philippe; Kerry Deignan Roy
- Cinematography: Robert Muratore
- Edited by: Chad Herschberger
- Music by: Jon Hegel
- Production companies: Exhibit A Pictures; Quark Films; NECA Films
- Distributed by: Wrekin Hill Entertainment
- Release dates: March 14, 2010 (SXSW); October 25, 2011 (DVD)
- Running time: 92 minutes
- Country: United States
- Language: English

The People vs. George Lucas is a 2010 documentary comedy film directed by Swiss director Alexandre O. Philippe. It explores the issues of filmmaking and fanaticism pertaining to the Star Wars franchise and its creator, George Lucas. The film combines filmmaker and celebrity interviews with fan films, mainly taken from the 2010 online video Star Wars Uncut, which were submitted via the film's site.

Interviewees include a variety of figures such as Neil Gaiman, Ian Freer, MC Frontalot and Gary Kurtz. Lucas appears frequently in archival footage, but is never interviewed directly. The film discusses the extent to which the Star Wars franchise is an artistic creation of Lucas and subject to his vision versus a social phenomenon that belongs to the general public of fans and their participatory/remix culture. The film is dedicated to interviewee Jason Nicholl, a blogger at nukethefridge.com who died before the film's release. It was released on DVD on October 25, 2011.

In June 2014, it was reported that a sequel was in development, though it has not been released as of 2025.

== Background and contents ==
The film begins with a brief history of George Lucas' career leading up to the release of Star Wars in 1977. The rest of the film is structured by inter-cutting interviews with many different fans, academics, film critics, former colleagues of Lucas, well-known writers in the science fiction/fantasy genre and others. The narrative of the film shows the complex relationship between Lucas and his fans, as well as how and why Star Wars achieved its mass appeal.

Director Alexandre O. Philippe, a lifetime Star Wars fan from his early childhood, said that the film was not meant to be one-sided against Lucas, although the title has often created that interpretation. He instead aimed at exploring to what extent the Star Wars franchise is controlled by Lucas versus something morally held by the public. He felt that Lucas was a relatively talented director and an "ideas man," based on the original Star Wars trilogy, THX 1138 (1971) and American Graffiti (1973). However, he disliked the changes made by Lucas in re-releases of the original trilogy as well as the prequel trilogy.

Philippe stated that, to his knowledge, Lucas had never seen the documentary, but that he would love to hold a private screening at Skywalker Ranch.

== Critical reception ==
On review aggregation website Rotten Tomatoes the film has a rating of 72%, based on 25 reviews, with an average rating of 6.7/10. On Metacritic, the film has a score of 55 out of 100, based on 7 critics, indicating "mixed or average reviews".

AMC critic Josh Bell wrote, "People is a skillfully edited, wide-ranging look at a subject that's very close to many movie fans' hearts, part of an ongoing debate that will only gain more attention as Lucas continues to tinker with his creations."

Independent critic Christian Toto praised the film and wrote that "the Force is strong with this one". Salt Lake City Weekly ran a negative review by Bryan Young, who commented that the "film comes off as a one-sided attack" and that it's "not hard to talk to people who love Star Wars... the filmmakers should have tried harder to provide that balance."

Slant Magazine writer Elise Nakhnikian lauded the film as "one of this year's best" documentaries, calling it "Smart, funny, and often impassioned."

On February 2, 2017, Mark Hamill stated during an interview that he felt that the documentary is biased against Lucas and the prequels and that he could not believe the backlash that they received. He turned down an opportunity to be interviewed in the film, stating that: "[t]hey weren’t calling it The People vs. George Lucas at the time, but I could tell from the questions they were asking me that it was an open invitation to trash George."

== Sequel ==
In June 2014 it was reported that a sequel, The People vs. George Lucas – Episode II, was in development. The film would examine what fans thought of the Star Wars franchise after being sold to The Walt Disney Company, and would pose the question, "What does the future of Star Wars look like without George Lucas?" The sequel was projected to release in 2015. As of 2025, it has yet to be released.

== See also ==
- Cultural impact of Star Wars
- RedLetterMedia reviews
- Trekkies
- Participatory culture
- Remix culture
