= Psycho shower scene =

1960 film sequence

A snippet of the shower scene

In Alfred Hitchcock's 1960 horror film Psycho, a pivotal sequence depicts on-the-run embezzler Marion Crane (played by Janet Leigh) being murdered by a shadowy figure while she showers. This sequence, commonly referred to as the "Psycho shower scene" or "the shower", has become a popular culture phenomenon and one of the best-known in all of cinema.

Hitchcock conceived the shower scene especially for Psycho, replacing Marion's decapitation from the original novel. Based on a storyboard drawn by designer Saul Bass, it was shot over a week in December 1959. Notable effects include using chocolate syrup in place of theatrical blood, creating the stabbing sounds by puncturing a melon, and scoring the scene with "The Murder" by composer Bernard Herrmann.

Regarded as Psycho's most infamous scene, the shower sequence became key to the film's success and influence, with its performances, cinematography, production, and sound design earning lasting acclaim. It has been parodied several times in popular culture, including in Scream Queens by Leigh's daughter, Jamie Lee Curtis. A documentary called 78/52 covering its production was released in 2017.

== Synopsis ==
Prior to the scene, Marion Crane, a secretary turned embezzler from Phoenix, has rented a cabin at the Bates Motel. She is invited to dinner in the motel's office by proprietor Norman Bates. When Norman leaves to retrieve the food from his house, Marion overhears an argument between him and his mother. He returns and they have a conversation, after which she decides to drive back to Phoenix to return the money she stole. She is then seen at her room desk scribbling math in a notebook, before tearing out the page and shredding it.

The sequence begins when Marion enters the bathroom, discards the page in the toilet, and disrobes to take a shower. After stepping into the shower, she unwraps the soap and turns on the water. As she showers, a shadowy figure enters the bathroom and pulls open the shower curtain. The figure, wielding a knife, slashes Marion multiple times as she screams and struggles. As the figure leaves, Marion collapses to the floor and pulls down the shower curtain as she dies. Shortly after, Norman is heard horrified at his mother and enters the bathroom to find Marion dead. He haphazardly cleans up the murder scene and sinks Marion's body and her belongings—including the hidden cash, unbeknownst to him—with her car in a swamp.

The sequence is backed by "The Murder", composed by Bernard Herrmann, which consists of screeching violins, violas, and cellos. Its cinematography includes rapid cuts, a straight-on shot of the shower head, and a zoom-out shot from Marion's lifeless eye.

== Background ==
=== Development ===
Hitchcock began adapting Robert Bloch's novel Psycho into a film in 1959, buying the rights for $9,500 and reportedly ordering his assistant Peggy Robertson to buy all copies to preserve the story. Hitchcock chose to film Psycho in black and white; one of his reasons for doing so was his desire to prevent the shower scene from being too gory. In the novel, Marion is decapitated in the shower rather than stabbed to death.

The film was independently produced and financed by Hitchcock on a tight budget of $807,000. It was shot at Revue Studios from November 1959 to February 1960. The crew, which cost $62,000, included Bernard Herrmann as the music composer, George Tomasini as the editor, and Saul Bass for the title design and storyboarding of the shower scene. To portray the character of Marion Crane, Hitchcock cast actress Janet Leigh and paid her $25,000 for the role. Leigh accepted based on Hitchcock's reputation and having previously read the novel.

=== Production ===
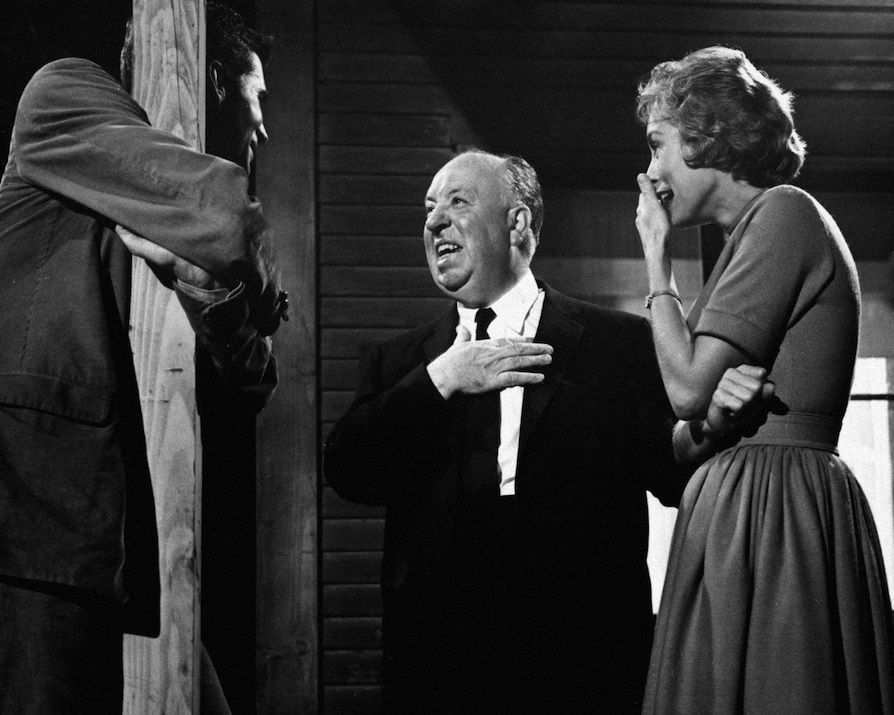
A picture taken during the filming of Psycho in 1960. From left to right: Anthony Perkins (who portrays Norman Bates), Alfred Hitchcock and Janet Leigh (who portrays Marion Crane).

The shower scene was shot December 17–23, 1959, after Leigh had twice postponed the filming—first because of a cold and then because of her menstrual period.

Before production, Leigh and Hitchcock had a conversation about the scene's meaning:

Marion had decided to go back to Phoenix, come clean, and take the consequences, so when she stepped into the bathtub, it was as if she were stepping into the baptismal waters. The spray beating down on her was purifying the corruption from her mind, purging the evil from her soul. She was like a virgin again, tranquil, at peace.

To capture the straight-on shot of the shower head, the camera had to be equipped with a long lens. The inner holes on the shower head were blocked and the camera placed a sufficient distance away so that the water, while appearing to be aimed directly at the lens, actually went around and past it. The final shot in the scene, which starts with an extreme close-up on Marion's eye and zooms in and out, proved difficult for Leigh because the water splashing in her eyes made her want to blink. The cameraman also struggled with the scene because he had to manually focus while moving the camera. All of the screams are Leigh's.

Hitchcock originally intended to have no music for the sequence (and all motel scenes), but Herrmann insisted he try his composition. Afterward Hitchcock agreed it vastly intensified the scene and nearly doubled Herrmann's salary. The blood in the scene was Hershey's chocolate syrup, which photographed better in black and white and had more realistic consistency than stage blood. The sound of the knife entering flesh was created by plunging a knife into a melon.

The finished scene runs some three minutes. After filming wrapped, Leigh was no longer available so Hitchcock had Vera Miles don a blonde wig and scream loudly as he pulled the shower curtain back in the bathroom sequence of the preview trailer. Because the title Psycho instantly covers most of the screen, the switch went unnoticed by audiences for years. However, a freeze-frame analysis clearly reveals that it is Miles and not Leigh in the shower during the trailer.

=== Censorship ===
According to Stephen Rebello's 1990 book Alfred Hitchcock and the Making of Psycho, the censors in charge of enforcing the Production Code wrangled with Hitchcock because some of them insisted they could see one of Leigh's breasts. As a result, each of the censors reversed their positions: those who had previously seen the breast now did not, and those who had not now did. They passed the film after the director removed one shot that showed the buttocks of Leigh's stand-in. The board was also upset by the racy opening, so Hitchcock said that if they let him keep the shower scene, he would re-shoot the opening with them on the set. Because board members did not show up for the re-shoot, the opening stayed.

Internationally Hitchcock was forced to make minor changes to the film, mostly to the shower scene. In the United Kingdom, the British Board of Film Classification (BBFC) required cuts to stabbing sounds and visible nude shots, and in New Zealand the shot of Norman washing blood from his hands was seen as disgusting. In Ireland, censor Gerry O'Hara banned it upon his initial viewing in 1960. The next year, a highly edited version missing some 47 feet of film was submitted to the Irish censor. O'Hara ultimately requested that an additional seven cuts be made: the line where Marion tells Sam to put his shoes on (which implied that he had his pants or trousers off), two shots of Norman spying on Marion through the hole in the wall, Marion's undressing, the shots of Marion's blood flowing down the shower drain, the shots of Norman washing his hands when blood is visible, repeated incidents of stabbings ("One stab is surely enough", wrote O'Hara), the words "in bed" from the sheriff's wife's line ("Norman found them dead together...in bed"), and Arbogast's questions to Norman about whether he spent the night with Marion. In 1986 the uncut version of Psycho was accepted by the BBFC, which classified it at 15.

== Myths and misconceptions ==
=== Leigh's filming experience ===
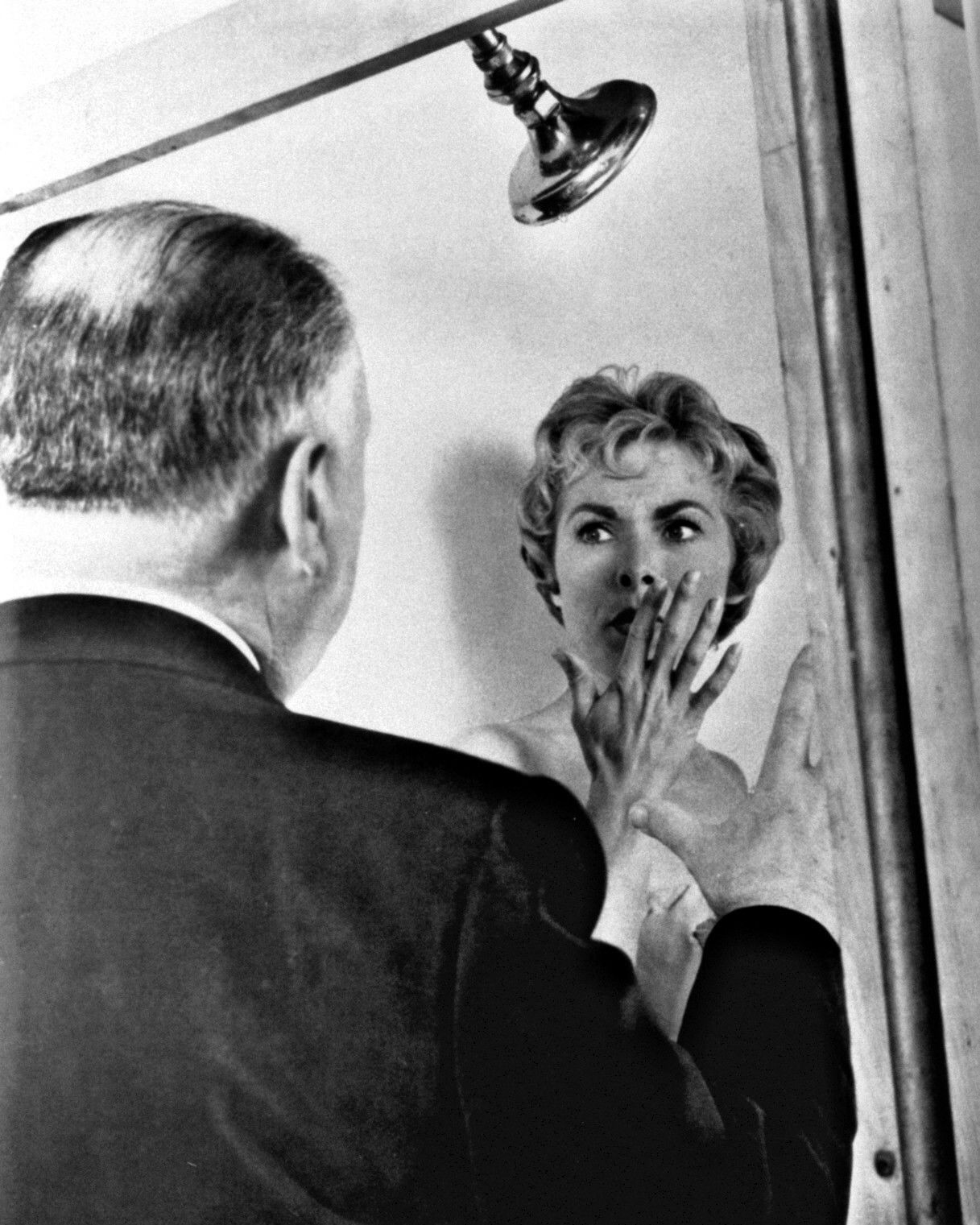
Leigh filming the shower scene with Hitchcock in 1959

There are varying accounts about whether Leigh was in the shower the entire time or a body double was used for some parts of the murder sequence and its aftermath. In an interview with Roger Ebert and in the 1990 book by Stephen Rebello, Alfred Hitchcock and the Making of Psycho, Leigh stated she appeared in the scene the entire time and Hitchcock used a stand-in only for the sequence in which Norman wraps Marion's body in a shower curtain and places it in the trunk of her car. The 2010 book The Girl in Alfred Hitchcock's Shower by Robert Graysmith and the documentary 78/52: Hitchcock's Shower Scene contradict this, identifying Marli Renfro as Leigh's body double for some of the shower scene's shots. Graysmith also stated that Hitchcock later acknowledged Renfro's participation in the scene. Rita Riggs, who was in charge of wardrobe, claims it was Leigh in the shower the entire time, explaining that Leigh did not wish to be nude and so she devised strategic items, including pasties, moleskin, and bodystockings, to be pasted on Leigh for the scene. Riggs and Leigh went through striptease magazines that showed all the different costumes, but none of them worked because they all had tassels on them. Hitchcock said, "As you know, you could not take the camera and just show a nude woman, it had to be done impressionistically. So, it was done with little pieces of film, the head, the feet, the hand, etc."

According to Donald Spoto in The Dark Side of Genius and Rebello in Alfred Hitchcock and the Making of Psycho, Hitchcock's wife and trusted collaborator, Alma Reville, spotted a blooper in one of the last edits of the film before its official release: after Marion was supposedly dead, one could see her blink. According to Patricia Hitchcock, talking in Laurent Bouzereau's "Making of" documentary, Alma spotted that Leigh's character appeared to take a breath. In either case, the postmortem activity was edited out and was never seen by audiences. Although Marion's eyes should have been dilated after her death, the contact lenses necessary for this effect would have required six weeks of acclimatization to wear them, so Hitchcock decided to forgo them.

=== Effects and sound design ===
The shower scene's flurry of action and edits has produced contradictory attempts to count the number of shots or cuts involved. Hitchcock himself contributed to this uncertainty, telling director François Truffaut that "there were seventy camera setups for forty-five seconds of footage", and maintaining to other interviewers that there were "seventy-eight pieces of the film". But in his description of the shower scene, film scholar Philip J. Skerry counted only 60 separate shots, with a table breaking down the middle 34 by type, camera position, angle, movement, focus, POV, and subject.

It is often claimed that, despite its graphic nature, the shower scene never once shows a knife puncturing flesh. However, a frame-by-frame analysis of the sequence shows one shot in which the knife appears to penetrate Leigh's abdomen, an effect created through lighting and reverse motion.

There were rumors that Herrmann had used electronic means, including amplified bird screeches, to achieve the shocking effect of the music in the shower scene. The effect was achieved, however, only with violins in a "screeching, stabbing sound-motion of extraordinary viciousness". The only electronic amplification employed was the placing of the microphones close to the instruments in order to get a harsher sound. Besides the emotional impact, the shower scene cue ties the soundtrack to birds. This association with birds also telegraphs to the audience that it is Norman, the stuffed-bird collector, who is the murderer rather than his mother.

=== Saul Bass's claim to credit ===
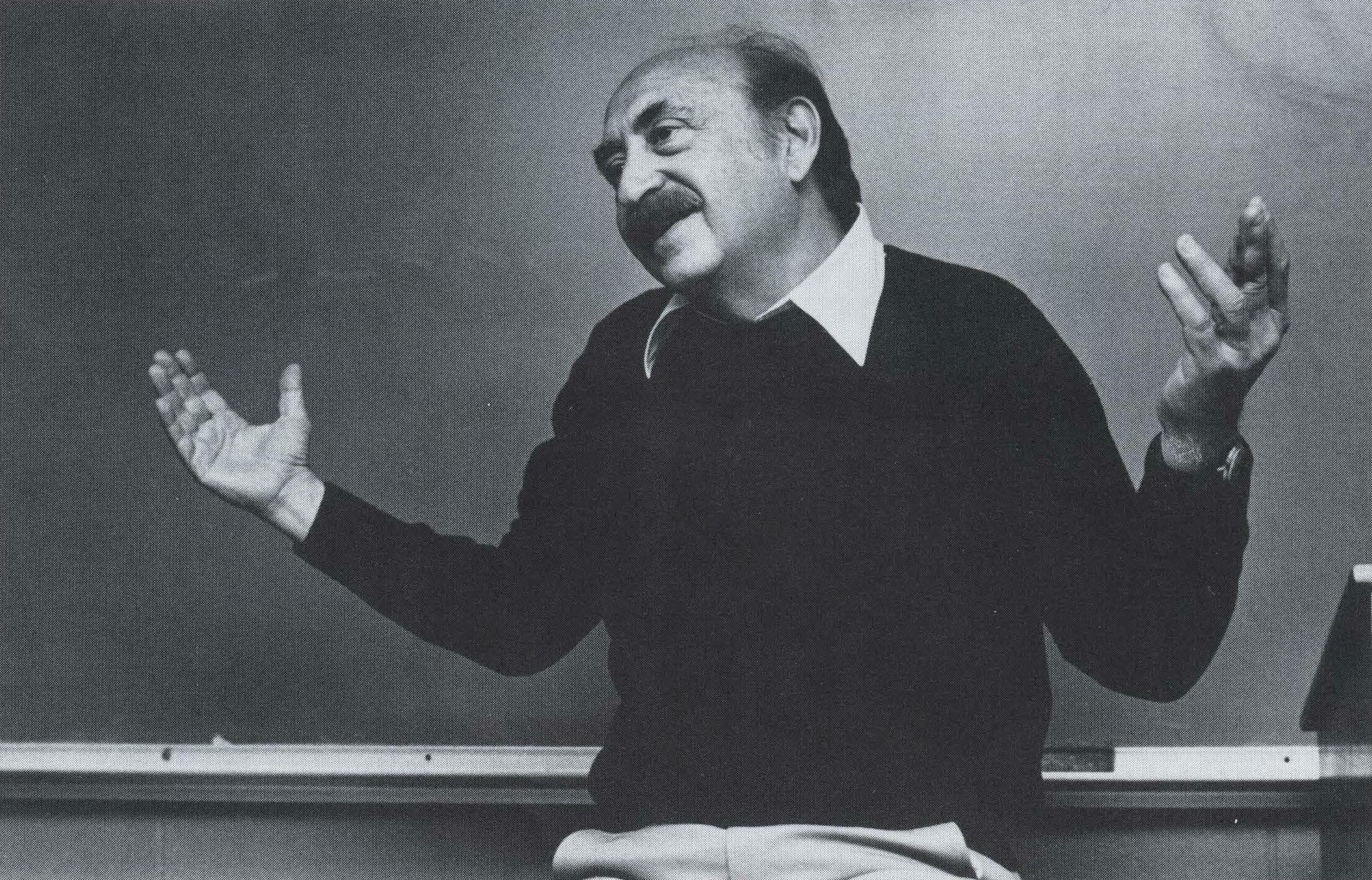
Saul Bass (pictured above in 1979) designed the shower scene storyboard. He was notably claimed to have directed the scene, which was continually disputed by Hilton A. Green, Hitchcock and Leigh.

Aside from the cold water myth, another claim was that graphic designer Saul Bass directed the shower scene. This was denied by several figures associated with the film, including Leigh, who stated: "Absolutely not! I have emphatically said this in any interview I've ever given. I've said it to his face in front of other people ... I was in that shower for seven days, and, believe me, Alfred Hitchcock was right next to his camera for every one of those seventy-odd shots". Assistant director Hilton A. Green also rebuts the claim: "There is not a shot in that movie that I didn't roll the camera for. And I can tell you I never rolled the camera for Mr. Bass". Ebert summarily dismissed the rumor: "It seems unlikely that a perfectionist with an ego like Hitchcock's would let someone else direct such a scene".

Commentators such as Rebello and Bill Krohn have argued in favor of Bass's contribution to the scene in his capacity as a visual consultant and storyboard artist. Along with designing the opening credits, Bass is termed "Pictorial Consultant" in the credits. When interviewing Hitchcock in 1967, Truffaut asked about the extent of Bass' contribution, to which Hitchcock replied that in addition to the titles, Bass had provided storyboards for the Arbogast murder (which he claimed to have rejected), but made no mention of Bass' having provided storyboards for the shower scene.

== Analysis ==
The shower scene has been frequently analyzed by critics and scholars. Geoffrey Macnab of The Independent claims that, as directors Peter Bogdanovich and Guillermo del Toro discussed also for 78/52, "attitudes to sex, mothers and politics in early 1960s America" can be found. The heavy downpour has been seen as a foreshadowing of the shower scene, and its cessation can be seen as a symbol of Marion making up her mind to return to Phoenix. Film theorist Robin Wood discusses how the shower washes "away her guilt". He comments upon the "alienation effect" of killing off the "apparent center of the film" with which spectators had identified.

David Thomson wrote in a 2010 essay for The Guardian: "The point of the scene is the onslaught on sensibility and the weird mixture of feelings left in us – for we are being attacked, but we are the attacker too. What ensures that ambivalence is the very deliberate way in which for 40 minutes the movie has stripped, grilled and stared at Marion until we want her and her flesh." After the release of Alexandre O. Philippe's 78/52: Hitchcock's Shower Scene in 2017, the British Film Institute (BFI) similarly observed the layers of voyeurism in the scene during a promotional interview with Philippe. Oliver Lunn noted that it developed the theme from Hitchcock's previous film Rear Window (1954), in which Jeff spies on his neighbors through a window. As Philippe wrote, "He (Hitchcock) removes the voyeuristic painting to become the voyeur looking in on the shower, there were all these people above, just watching her, which I think is another interesting element of voyeurism – it’s very meta." Lunn also wrote, "Add to that the male crewmembers above the shower, voyeurs out of frame. [...] They watch her, Norman watches her, Hitchcock’s camera watches her, and of course, we watch her."

== Legacy ==
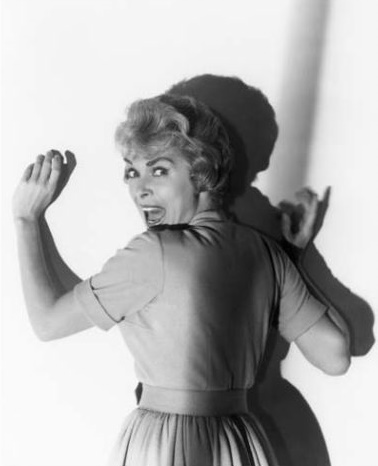
Leigh (pictured in a 1960 promotional photo for the film) was traumatized by the shower scene.

The shower scene has become a touchstone in popular culture and is often regarded as an iconic moment in cinematic history. It was described by the review aggregator website Rotten Tomatoes and the educational channel History as Psycho's most infamous scene. The scene has been frequently parodied and referenced in popular culture complete with the screeching violin sound effects, with notable examples including Charlie and the Chocolate Factory, and Scream Queens with Leigh's daughter, Jamie Lee Curtis. Additionally, The Guardian ranked the shower scene at number two on their 2000 list of "The top 10 film moments", while Bravo featured it number four on their 2007 list of 100 Scariest Movie Moments.

A critic in The Daily Telegraph who gave the initials of R.P.M.G. additionally praised Leigh's "pleasing performance as the girl he kills with a knife while she is under a shower". The scene became a career-defining moment for the actress, on which she commented: "I've been in a great many films, but I suppose if an actor can be remembered for one role, then they're very fortunate. And in that sense I'm fortunate." However, she was so affected by the scene when she saw it that she no longer took showers unless she absolutely had to; she would lock all the doors and windows and leave the bathroom and shower door open. She never realized until she first watched the film "how vulnerable and defenseless one is".

Herrmann biographer Steven C. Smith writes that the music for the shower scene is "probably the most famous (and most imitated) cue in film music". A survey conducted by PRS for Music, in 2009, showed that the British public considers the score from 'the shower scene' to be the scariest theme from any film. In articles for BBC and The Guardian, musicians such as Rachel Zeffira and Michael Waller noted its influence in modern music, with artists like Busta Rhymes sampling it in their works.

78/52: Hitchcock's Shower Scene, a documentary on its production by Alexandre O. Philippe, was released on October 13, 2017. It features interviews with and analysis by Guillermo del Toro, Peter Bogdanovich, Bret Easton Ellis, Jamie Lee Curtis, Marli Renfro, Karyn Kusama, Eli Roth, Oz Perkins, Leigh Whannell, Walter Murch, Danny Elfman, Elijah Wood, Richard Stanley, and Neil Marshall.
