= Act of Murder =

Act of Murder may refer to:

- An Act of Murder, a 1948 American film noir directed by Michael Gordon
- Act of Murder (film), a 1964 British crime drama film directed by Alan Bridges
- Act of Murder, a 1993 documentary film by Shirley Horrocks
- Act of Murder (novel), a 2010 novel by Alan Wright
- An Act of Murder, a work of interactive fiction by Christopher Huang, nominated for multiple 2007 XYZZY Awards

== See also ==
- Homicide
- Murder
- UK Acts of Parliament
  - Murder Act 1751
  - Homicide Act 1957
  - Murder (Abolition of Death Penalty) Act 1965
