= Murder One =

Murder one usually refers to first-degree murder.

Murder One may also refer to:

== Film and TV ==
- Murder One (film), a 1988 biographical crime drama film
- Murder One (TV series), American legal serial broadcast on ABC in 1995–97
- Murder 1 (film), first installment, in 2004, of Bollywood film series, Murder

== Music ==
- Murder One, album by Paul Di'Anno
- Murder One, former band of a member of Mob Rules
- Murder One, bass amplifier head blown up by Lemmy
- Murder One Records, label for Sean T

=== Songs ===
- "Murder One", song by 50 Cent from The Lost Tape
- "Murder One", song by Metallica from Hardwired... to Self-Destruct
- "Murder One", song by Sodom from In War and Pieces

== Other ==
- Murder One (bookshop), book store in London, open from 1988 to 2009
- Heroin (slang)
