= Murder, Inc. (disambiguation) =

Murder, Inc. was an organized crime group in the 1930s.

Murder, Inc. may also refer to:

== Aircraft ==
- Murder Inc., a notable B-17 bomber during World War II

== Films ==
- Murder, Inc. (1951 film), British title of 1951 film The Enforcer
- Murder, Inc. (1960 film), American gangster film directed by Burt Balaban and Stuart Rosenberg

== Literature ==
- Murder, Inc.: The Story of the Syndicate, a 1951 book by Burton Turkus and Sid Feder chronicling Murder, Inc.
- Murder Inc., Las Vegas, a novel
- Murder Incorporated: The Rise and Fall of Ireland's Deadliest Gang, a non-fiction book by Paul Williams

== Music ==
- Murder, Inc. (band), industrial music supergroup formed in 1991
  - Murder, Inc. (album), their only studio album
- Murder Inc. (rap group), American hip hop supergroup formed by Irv Gotti in 1995
- Murder Inc. Records, a New York City-based Hip hop and R&B record label
- "Murder Incorporated", song by Bruce Springsteen on Greatest Hits
