= Murder! (video game) =

1990 video game

- Developer: U.S. Gold
- Publisher: U.S. Gold
- Platforms: Amiga, Atari ST, MS-DOS
- Release: 1990
- Genre: Adventure

Murder! is an adventure video game published by in 1990 by U.S. Gold for the Amiga, Atari ST, and MS-DOS. A Commodore 64 version was finished and reviewed in 1990 but never released.

== Gameplay ==
The player is a master detective who solves murder mysteries. The game is a point-and-click adventure game with an isometric perspective. The murder scenarios are randomized, with a claimed 3 million unique combinations of elements.

The game has four difficulty levels, ranging from novice to super sleuth. The player solves the case by exploring a four level mansion for clues or evidence, questioning suspects over a two hour period.

== Reception ==
Reception

Review scores
Publication	Score
ACE	805/1000
Amiga Action	78%
Amiga Computing	65%
Amiga Format	81%
Computer and Video Games	92%
Joystick	90%
Zzap!64	92%

David Wilson reviewed the game for Computer Gaming World, and stated that while he noted similarities to the board game Clue, he found the game much more complex and sophisticated, and also said that the players can quickly learn and solve mysteries easily.

=== Reviews ===
- Computer and Video Games - September 1990
- Zzap! - September 1990
- Info - January 1992
- The One - September 1990
- ACE (Advanced Computer Entertainment) - October 1990
- Zero - October 1990
- ST Format - September 1990
- Amiga User International - January 1991
- The Games Machine
- Amiga Format
- CU Amiga
- Amiga Action
- Amiga Computing
