= Mo Murda =

Mo Murda may refer to:

- "Mo' Murda", a 1995 song by Bone Thugs-n-Harmony
- "Mo Money, Mo Murder", a 1995 song by AZ featuring Nas
- "Mo Murder". a 1995 song by Gangsta Pat, from Deadly Verses
- "Mo' Murder", a 1996 song by Mo Thugs, performed by Krayzie Bone
- "Murda Mo'", a 1999 song by Krayzie Bone
- "Mr. Murda Mo", a 2013 single by Layzie Bone featuring Harmony Howse
