= The Murder =

Cinematic score by Bernard Herrmann

Composition by Bernard Herrmann
- Released: 1960
- Genre: Film Score

"The Murder" is a cue in the cinematic score written and composed by Bernard Herrmann for the horror-thriller film Psycho (1960) directed by Alfred Hitchcock. The score, its second movement in particular, is well recognized as one of the most famous scores in film history. It was composed for an orchestral string section.

== Psycho's shower scene ==
The cue was composed for the famous shower scene, the murder of Janet Leigh's character, Marion Crane. Hitchcock originally wanted the sequence (and all motel scenes) to play without music, but Herrmann insisted he try it with the cue he had composed. Afterward, Hitchcock agreed that it vastly intensified the scene, and he nearly doubled Herrmann's salary.

== Movements ==
The score is divided into three main movements:

1st Movement

The first movement of the score is made up of multiple runs, trills, and short, staccato stabs played agitato. While there is no direct melody, the fast-paced runs constantly shift between the keys of F, F♯, C♯, and D, with a few sections played in G. A notable feature that Herrmann implemented is the use of alternating eighth-note semitones to create a sense of approaching and imminent danger. John Williams made this technique famous 15 years later in his score for Steven Spielberg's Jaws (1975). The movement ends with a high Bbm9 chord that crescendoes to an abrupt fermata cutoff.

2nd Movement

The second movement is the most recognizable piece of the score: directly after the first movement's fermata, a lone first violin launches directly into a series of discordant, screechy glissandos before being joined by the rest of the string section. This pattern is repeated twice, albeit the second set of glissandos is notated somewhat differently. The movements ends with another fermata.

3rd Movement

The cello and contrabass start the third movement with long, low, drawn out dotted half-notes that are answered with minute, staccato stabs from the rest of the string section. The half-notes alternate between E and F 3 three times before going down to C.
