= Alexandre O. Philippe =

Swiss film director

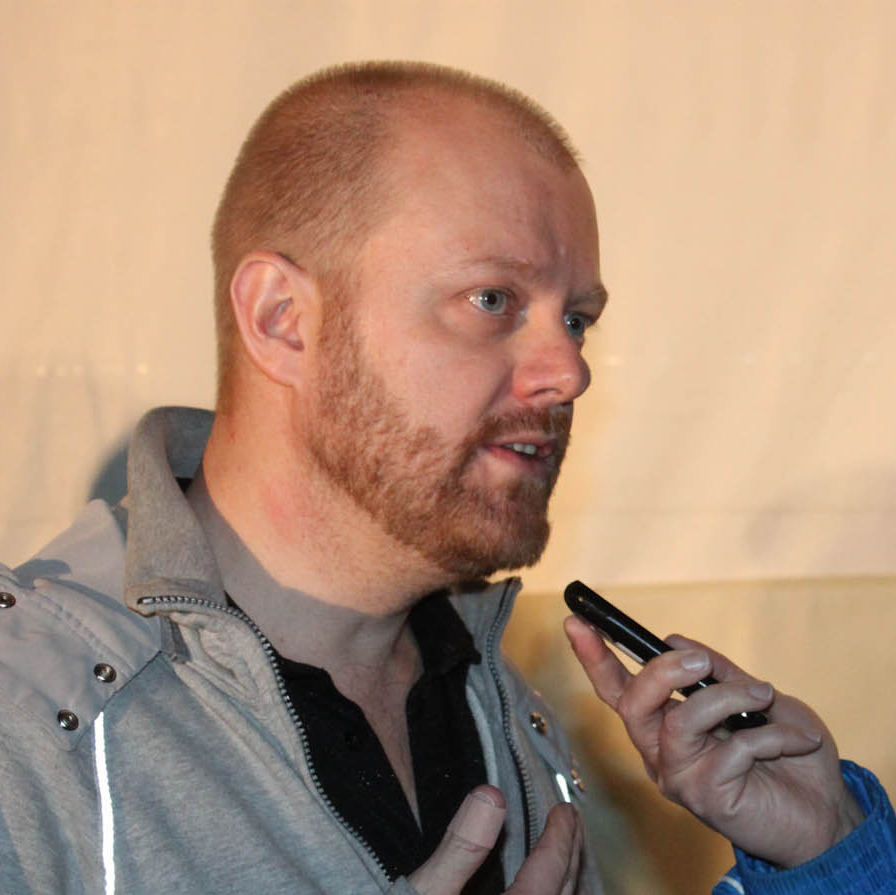
- Philippe in 2012
- Born: November 6, 1972 (age 53); Geneva, Switzerland
- Citizenship: Switzerland, United States of America, France
- Education: MFA in Dramatic Writing from NYU's Tisch School of the Arts
- Alma mater: New York University
- Occupation: Director
- Years active: 2000–present

Alexandre O. Philippe (born November 6, 1972) is a Swiss-American documentary filmmaker, writer, and producer known for films about cinema, film history, and popular culture.

He first gained international attention with The People vs. George Lucas (2010), a documentary examining fan culture surrounding the Star Wars franchise and its creator George Lucas. He later directed Doc of the Dead (2014), a documentary exploring the cultural history of zombies in film and media.

Philippe became more widely recognized for a series of analytical documentaries focused on individual films and filmmakers, including 78/52 (2017), about the shower sequence in Alfred Hitchcock's Psycho (1960); Memory: The Origins of Alien (2019); Leap of Faith: William Friedkin on The Exorcist (2019); The Taking (2021); Lynch/Oz (2022); You Can Call Me Bill (2023); Chain Reactions (2024); and Kim Novak's Vertigo (2025).

His films have regularly premiered and screened at major international film festivals, including Sundance, Venice, SXSW, and Tribeca. His work has also been featured extensively on the international circuit, with screenings at prestigious global venues such as the BFI London Film Festival, Karlovy Vary, Telluride, and the Edinburgh International Film Festival.

In 2024, Chain Reactions received the Venice Classics Award for Best Documentary on Cinema at the Venice International Film Festival.

Philippe is the recipient of the 2025 Indie Star Award and the Honorary Award for Creative Excellence in Cinema from the Reykjavik International Film Festival.

== Career ==
Philippe received a Master of Fine Arts in Dramatic Writing from New York University's Tisch School of the Arts.

He began his career with documentary work focused on film culture and fandom. His breakout feature, The People vs. George Lucas (2010), examines audience communities and cultural reception of the Star Wars franchise. He followed with Doc of the Dead (2014), a documentary on the history and cultural impact of zombies in popular media.

78/52 (2017) marked a shift toward formally structured documentary essays focused on specific cinematic moments. The film examines the shower sequence in Alfred Hitchcock's Psycho (1960) as a lens for broader cinematic analysis.

In 2019, Philippe released Memory: The Origins of Alien and Leap of Faith: William Friedkin on The Exorcist, both of which examine the production histories and cultural influence of landmark genre films. These works premiered at major international festivals including Sundance and Venice.

Subsequent works include The Taking (2021), which examines the cinematic associations of Monument Valley; Lynch/Oz (2022), which explores the influence of The Wizard of Oz on the films of David Lynch; You Can Call Me Bill (2023), a documentary portrait of William Shatner; Chain Reactions (2024), which examines the cultural legacy of The Texas Chain Saw Massacre; and Kim Novak's Vertigo (2025), a documentary portrait of Kim Novak that blends archival material and personal reflection to examine her life, her career, and her connection to Alfred Hitchcock's Vertigo.

In 2025 and 2026, Philippe announced several future documentary projects. Among them are In Search of Nosferatu, a documentary exploring the worldwide search for surviving prints and materials related to F. W. Murnau's 1922 film Nosferatu, and The Fall, a documentary examining Alfred Hitchcock's Vertigo through an analysis of one of its most discussed unresolved moments. Both projects are currently in production and are scheduled for release in 2028.

== Style and themes ==
Philippe's documentaries are frequently described as essayistic in form, often structured as analytical explorations of individual films, filmmakers, or cinematic sequences. His work typically combines interviews, archival material, and thematic analysis to examine the cultural and historical significance of cinema.

Critics and institutions have noted his recurring focus on the influence and legacy of cinema, with many of his films structured around a single film or cinematic moment as a framework for broader cultural analysis.

The BFI London Film Festival has described his work as examining influential films and dissecting key moments in cinematic history.

His films are often associated with the documentary essay tradition and approaches that emphasize interpretation and cultural analysis.

== Film festivals and public engagement ==
Philippe's documentaries have been screened extensively at major international film festivals, frequently debuting at top-tier venues such as Sundance, Venice, Tribeca, and SXSW. In addition to these primary competitive platforms, his work is a regular fixture at prominent global events including the BFI London Film Festival, Filmfest München, and Karlovy Vary. His genre-focused film essays have also achieved significant public engagement within international genre circuits, anchoring screenings at specialized festivals like Sitges, as well as major documentary exhibitions including Hot Docs.

He has also participated in curated programs and retrospectives focused on documentary film essays and cinema analysis.

In addition to filmmaking, Philippe regularly participates in public speaking engagements, including masterclasses, lectures, and talks at universities, film festivals, and cultural institutions worldwide.

He has served on numerous international film festival juries and in 2024 served as Jury President of the Official Competition at the BFI London Film Festival.

== Awards and recognition ==
In 2024, Chain Reactions received the Venice Classics Award for Best Documentary on Cinema at the Venice International Film Festival.

In 2025, Philippe received the Indie Star Award in recognition of his contributions to independent cinema.

He also received the Honorary Award for Creative Excellence in Cinema from the Reykjavik International Film Festival.

== Filmography ==
- 2003: Chick Flick: The Miracle Mike Story (Documentary)
- 2004: Earthlings: Ugly Bags of Mostly Water (Documentary)
- 2006: Left (Short)
- 2008: The Spot (Documentary short)
- 2009: Inside (Short)
- 2010: The People vs. George Lucas (Documentary)
- 2011: The Right to Breathe (Documentary short)
- 2012: The Life and Times of Paul the Psychic Octopus (Documentary)
- 2014: Doc of the Dead (Documentary)
- 2017: 78/52 (Documentary) - Distributed by IFC
- 2019: Memory: The Origins of Alien (Documentary)
- 2020: Leap of Faith: William Friedkin on The Exorcist (Documentary)
- 2021: The Taking
- 2022: Lynch/Oz (Documentary)
- 2023: William Shatner: You Can Call Me Bill (Documentary)
- 2024: Chain Reactions (Documentary)
- 2025: Kim Novak's Vertigo (Documentary)
