= 78/52 =

2017 documentary film

- Film poster
- Directed by: Alexandre O. Philippe
- Written by: Alexandre O. Philippe
- Produced by: Kerry Deignan Roy
- Cinematography: Robert Muratore
- Edited by: Chad Herschberger
- Music by: Jon Hegel
- Distributed by: IFC Midnight
- Release date: October 13, 2017
- Running time: 91 minutes
- Country: United States
- Language: English
- Box office: $46,838

78/52 is a 2017 American documentary film written and directed by Alexandre O. Philippe. It's an analysis of the shower scene in the 1960 horror film Psycho. 78/52 received positive reviews from critics.

== Summary ==
The film examines the shower scene in the 1960 horror film Psycho. Marion, played by Janet Leigh in her Academy Award-nominated role, takes a shower at the Bates Motel and is stabbed to death. The scene contains 78 camera setups and 52 cuts, which is why the documentary is titled 78/52.

== Release ==
It premiered at the 2017 Sundance Film Festival and was released on October 13, 2017.

== Reception ==
On the review aggregator website Rotten Tomatoes, 88% of 88 critics' reviews are positive, with an average rating of 7/10. The website's consensus reads: "78/52: Hitchcock's Shower Scene takes a look at one of modern cinema's most memorable moments, offering insights of value to cineastes and casual viewers alike." Metacritic, which uses a weighted average, assigned the film a score of 74 out of 100, based on 20 critics, indicating "generally favorable" reviews.

Godfrey Cheshire of RogerEbert.com gave the film three out of four stars and wrote, "Perhaps unsurprisingly, there are no interviewees here who question the value of Psycho or its impact on the culture. That's because it's basically a fan's film, of course. But it's also testament to the power and mastery of a movie that, nearly 60 years on, still feels as modern, complex and cutting-edge as any film released in 2017."
